= District 19 (Chamber of Deputies of Chile) =

Electoral district of the Chamber of Deputies of Chile

- Distrito 19
- Electoral District for the Chamber of Deputies
- Location of District 19 within Chile
- Region: Ñuble
- Population: 480,609 (2017)
- Electorate: 430,998 (2021)
- Area: 13,097 km^{2} (2020)

Current Electoral District
- Created: 2017
- Seats: 5 (2017–present)
- Deputies: List: Marta Bravo (UDI); Felipe Camaño (Ind); Sara Concha (PSC); Cristóbal Martínez (UDI); Frank Sauerbaum (RN)

District 19 (Spanish: Distrito 19) is one of the 28 multi-member electoral districts of the Chamber of Deputies, the lower house of the National Congress, the national legislature of Chile. The district was created by the 2015 electoral reform and came into being at the following general election in 2017. It is conterminous with the region of Ñuble. The district currently elects five of the 155 members of the Chamber of Deputies using the open party-list proportional representation electoral system. At the 2021 general election the district had 430,998 registered electors.

== History ==
District 19 was one of 28 electoral districts established by Ley N°20.840 Sustituye el sistema electoral binominal por uno de carácter proporcional inclusivo y fortalece la representatividad del Congreso Nacional passed by the National Congress in January 2015. It consisted of the communes of Bulnes, Cabrero, Chillán, Chillán Viejo, Cobquecura, Coelemu, Coihueco, El Carmen, Ninhue, Ñiquén, Pemuco, Pinto, Portezuelo, Quillón, Quirihue, Ránquil, San Carlos, San Fabián, San Ignacio, San Nicolás, Treguaco, Yumbel and Yungay in the region of Biobío. In September 2018 the province of Ñuble was promoted to region status. As a result, the communes of Cabrero and Yumbel, which were located in the province of Biobío, were transferred from District 19 to District 21.

== Electoral system ==
District 19 currently elects five of the 155 members of the Chamber of Deputies using the open party-list proportional representation electoral system. Parties may form electoral pacts with each other to pool their votes and increase their chances of winning seats. However, the number of candidates nominated by an electoral pact may not exceed the maximum number of candidates that a single party may nominate. Seats are allocated using the D'Hondt method.

== Election results ==
=== Summary ===
Election	Apruebo Dignidad AD / FA			Green Ecologists PEV			Dignidad Ahora DA			New Social Pact NPS / NM			Democratic Convergence CD			Chile Vamos Podemos / Vamos			Party of the People PDG			Christian Social Front FSC		
Election	Votes	%	Seats	Votes	%	Seats	Votes	%	Seats	Votes	%	Seats	Votes	%	Seats	Votes	%	Seats	Votes	%	Seats	Votes	%	Seats
2021	12,840	7.64%	0	11,115	6.61%	0	12,521	7.45%	0	31,180	18.55%	1				65,193	38.78%	3	15,573	9.26%	0	16,925	10.07%	1
2017	12,743	6.58%	0							53,153	27.43%	2	33,677	17.38%	1	72,992	37.67%	2						

=== Detailed ===
==== 2021 ====
Results of the 2021 general election held on 21 November 2021:

Party		Pact	Party						Pact		
Party		Pact	Votes per province			Total votes	%	Seats	Votes	%	Seats
Party		Pact	Diguillín	Itata	Punilla	Total votes	%	Seats	Votes	%	Seats
Independent Democratic Union	UDI	Chile Podemos +	25,910	2,656	12,559	41,125	24.46%	2	65,193	38.78%	3
National Renewal	RN	Chile Podemos +	11,914	4,302	5,945	22,161	13.18%	1	65,193	38.78%	3
Evópoli	EVO	Chile Podemos +	1,325	217	365	1,907	1.13%	0	65,193	38.78%	3
Christian Democratic Party	PDC	New Social Pact	7,936	1,610	2,941	12,487	7.43%	1	31,180	18.55%	1
Party for Democracy	PPD	New Social Pact	8,164	537	1,331	10,032	5.97%	0	31,180	18.55%	1
Radical Party of Chile	PR	New Social Pact	4,748	2,869	1,044	8,661	5.15%	0	31,180	18.55%	1
Christian Conservative Party	PCC	Christian Social Front	6,587	1,060	1,522	9,169	5.45%	1	16,925	10.07%	1
Republican Party	REP	Christian Social Front	5,794	672	1,290	7,756	4.61%	0	16,925	10.07%	1
Party of the People	PDG		10,767	2,123	2,683	15,573	9.26%	0	15,573	9.26%	0
Democratic Revolution	RD	Apruebo Dignidad	4,775	2,006	1,141	7,922	4.71%	0	12,840	7.64%	0
Communist Party of Chile	PC	Apruebo Dignidad	3,375	392	1,151	4,918	2.93%	0	12,840	7.64%	0
Humanist Party	PH	Dignidad Ahora	8,358	946	1,495	10,799	6.42%	0	12,521	7.45%	0
Equality Party	IGUAL	Dignidad Ahora	1,281	160	281	1,722	1.02%	0	12,521	7.45%	0
Green Ecologist Party	PEV		7,926	1,297	1,892	11,115	6.61%	0	11,115	6.61%	0
Progressive Party	PRO		1,803	409	553	2,765	1.64%	0	2,765	1.64%	0
Valid votes			110,663	21,256	36,193	168,112	100.00%	5	168,112	100.00%	5
Blank votes			8,979	3,506	3,801	16,286	8.40%				
Rejected votes – other			6,038	1,416	2,043	9,497	4.90%				
Total polled			125,680	26,178	42,037	193,895	44.99%				
Registered electors			276,817	56,202	97,979	430,998					
Turnout			45.40%	46.58%	42.90%	44.99%					

The following candidates were elected: Marta Bravo (UDI), 11,186 votes; Felipe Camaño (PDC), 8,127 votes; Sara Concha (PCC), 5,303 votes; Cristóbal Martínez (UDI), 29,939 votes; and Frank Sauerbaum (RN), 15,609 votes.

==== 2017 ====
Results of the 2017 general election held on 19 November 2017:

Party		Pact	Party							Pact		
Party		Pact	Votes per province				Total votes	%	Seats	Votes	%	Seats
Party		Pact	Biobío (part)	Diguillín	Itata	Punilla	Total votes	%	Seats	Votes	%	Seats
Independent Democratic Union	UDI	Chile Vamos	1,401	33,161	2,437	5,959	42,958	22.17%	1	72,992	37.67%	2
National Renewal	RN	Chile Vamos	1,811	14,476	5,132	8,615	30,034	15.50%	1	72,992	37.67%	2
Party for Democracy	PPD	Nueva Mayoría	4,530	10,804	2,665	5,849	23,848	12.31%	1	53,153	27.43%	2
Social Democrat Radical Party	PRSD	Nueva Mayoría	467	13,168	983	2,890	17,508	9.04%	1	53,153	27.43%	2
Socialist Party of Chile	PS	Nueva Mayoría	374	9,084	1,124	1,215	11,797	6.09%	0	53,153	27.43%	2
Christian Democratic Party	PDC	Democratic Convergence	6,197	11,130	8,066	8,284	33,677	17.38%	1	33,677	17.38%	1
País	PAIS	All Over Chile	624	10,761	1,116	1,239	13,740	7.09%	0	16,271	8.40%	0
Progressive Party	PRO	All Over Chile	291	1,298	347	595	2,531	1.31%	0	16,271	8.40%	0
Green Ecologist Party	PEV	Broad Front	675	4,394	746	1,056	6,871	3.55%	0	12,743	6.58%	0
Equality Party	IGUAL	Broad Front	394	2,904	527	924	4,749	2.45%	0	12,743	6.58%	0
Humanist Party	PH	Broad Front	113	682	142	186	1,123	0.58%	0	12,743	6.58%	0
Amplitude	AMP	Sumemos	446	2,210	700	1,587	4,943	2.55%	0	4,943	2.55%	0
Valid votes			17,323	114,072	23,985	38,399	193,779	100.00%	5	193,779	100.00%	5
Blank votes			1,864	6,565	2,091	2,779	13,299	6.14%				
Rejected votes – other			1,114	5,441	1,115	1,818	9,488	4.38%				
Total polled			20,301	126,078	27,191	42,996	216,566	47.51%				
Registered electors			43,989	264,297	54,784	92,807	455,877					
Turnout			46.15%	47.70%	49.63%	46.33%	47.51%					

The following candidates were elected: Loreto Carvajal (PPD), 12,734 votes; Carlos Abel Jarpa (PRSD), 15,377 votes; Jorge Sabag (PDC), 28,995 votes; Gustavo Sanhueza (UDI), 15,680 votes; and Frank Sauerbaum (RN), 18,107 votes.
