= Postal codes in Chile =

Postal codes in Chile are 7 digit numeric, grouped as NNNNNNN. The first digit generally corresponds to a Region or Province, while the next 2 correspond to the commune. The remaining 4 digits correspond to a city block. This system is administered by Correos de Chile.

- 1xx Northern Chile (Regions of Arica y Parinacota, Tarapacá, Antofagasta, Atacama, and Coquimbo)
- 2xx Region of Valparaíso
- 3xx Central Chile (Regions of O'Higgins, Maule, and Ñuble)
- 4xx Regions of Bíobío and Araucanía
- 5xx Regions of Los Ríos and Los Lagos
- 6xx Southern Chile (Regions of Aysén, and Magallanes y de la Antártica Chilena)
- 7xx Eastern Santiago (communes of Providencia, Las Condes, Vitacura, Lo Barnechea, Ñuñoa, La Reina, Macul and Peñalolén)
- 8xx Metropolitan Santiago (all communes from the Santiago Province not listed above, in addition to Puente Alto and San Bernardo).
- 9xx Rest of Santiago Metropolitan Region (Provinces of Chacabuco, Cordillera (except Puente Alto), Maipo (except San Bernardo), Melipilla and Talagante).

== Communal Codes ==
Commune/Locality	Postal Code
Algarrobo	2710000
Alhué	9650000
Alto Biobío	4590000
Alto del Carmen	1650000
Alto Hospicio	1130000
Ancud	5710000
Andacollo	1750000
Angol	4650000
Antártica	6360000
Antofagasta	1240000
Antuco	4490000
Arauco	4360000
Arica	1000000
Aysén	6000000
Buin	9500000
Bulnes	3930000
Cabildo	2050000
Cabo de Hornos	6350000
Cabrero	4470000
Calama	1390000
Calbuco	5570000
Caldera	1570000
Calera	2290000
Calera de Tango	9560000
Calle Larga	2130000
Camarones	1040000
Camiña	1150000
Canela	1960000
Cañete	4390000
Carahue	5010000
Cartagena	2680000
Casablanca	2480000
Castro	5700000
Catemu	2230000
Cauquenes	3690000
Cerrillos	9200000
Cerro Navia	9080000
Chaitén	5850000
Chanco	3720000
Chañaral	1490000
Chépica	3120000
Chiguayante	4100000
Chile Chico	6050000
Chillán	3780000
Chillán Viejo	3820000
Chimbarongo	3090000
Cholchol	5040000
Chonchi	5770000
Cisnes	6010000
Cobquecura	3990000
Cochamó	5560000
Cochrane	6100000
Codegua	2900000
Coelemu	3970000
Coihueco	3870000
Coinco	3010000
Colbún	3610000
Colchane	1160000
Colina	9340000
Collipulli	4680000
Coltauco	3000000
Combarbalá	1890000
Concepción	4030000
Conchalí	8540000
Concón	2510000
Constitución	3560000
Contulmo	4400000
Copiapó	1530000
Coquimbo	1780000
Coronel	4190000
Corral	5190000
Coyhaique	5950000
Cunco	4890000
Curacautín	4700000
Curacaví	9630000
Curaco de Vélez	5740000
Curanilahue	4370000
Curarrehue	4910000
Curepto	3570000
Curicó	3340000
Dalcahue	5730000
Diego de Almagro	1500000
Doñihue	3020000
El Bosque	8010000
El Carmen	3900000
El Monte	9810000
El Quisco	2700000
El Tabo	2690000
Empedrado	3540000
Ercilla	4710000
Estación Central	9160000
Florida	4170000
Freire	4940000
Freirina	1630000
Fresia	5600000
Frutillar	5620000
Futaleufú	5870000
Futrono	5180000
Galvarino	5030000
General Lagos	1080000
Gorbea	4960000
Graneros	2880000
Guaitecas	6020000
Hijuelas	2310000
Hualaihué	5860000
Hualañé	3400000
Hualpén	4600000
Hualqui	4180000
Huara	1140000
Huasco	1640000
Huechuraba	8580000
Illapel	1930000
Independencia	8380000
Iquique	1100000
Isla de Maipo	9790000
Isla de Pascua	2770000
Juan Fernández	2600000
La Cisterna	7970000
La Cruz	2280000
La Estrella	3250000
La Florida	8240000
La Granja	8780000
La Higuera	1740000
La Ligua	2040000
La Pintana	8820000
La Reina	7850000
Labranza	4810000
La Serena	1700000
La Unión	5220000
Lago Ranco	5250000
Lago Verde	5960000
Laguna Blanca	6250000
Laja	4560000
Lampa	9380000
Lanco	5160000
Las Cabras	3030000
Las Condes	7550000
Lautaro	4860000
Lebu	4350000
Licantén	3410000
Limache	2240000
Linares	3580000
Litueche	3240000
Llaillay	2220000
Llanquihue	5610000
Lo Barnechea	7690000
Lo Espejo	9120000
Lo Prado	8980000
Lolol	3140000
Loncoche	4970000
Longaví	3620000
Lonquimay	4690000
Los Álamos	4380000
Los Andes	2100000
Los Ángeles	4440000
Los Lagos	5170000
Los Muermos	5590000
Los Sauces	4760000
Los Vilos	1940000
Lota	4210000
Lumaco	4740000
Machalí	2910000
Macul	7810000
Máfil	5200000
Maipú	9250000
Malloa	2950000
Marchigüe	3260000
María Elena	1360000
María Pinto	9620000
Mariquina	5150000
Maule	3530000
Maullín	5580000
Mejillones	1310000
Melipeuco	4900000
Melipilla	9580000
Molina	3380000
Monte Patria	1880000
Mostazal	2890000
Mulchén	4530000
Nacimiento	4550000
Nancagua	3110000
Navidad	3230000
Negrete	4540000
Nogales	2300000
Nueva Imperial	5020000
Ninhue	4010000
Ñiquén	3850000
Ñuñoa	7750000
O'Higgins	6110000
Olivar	2920000
Ollagüe	1420000
Olmué	2330000
Osorno	5290000
Ovalle	1840000
Padre Hurtado	9710000
Padre Las Casas	4850000
Paihuano	1770000
Paillaco	5230000
Paine	9540000
Palena	5880000
Palmilla	3160000
Panguipulli	5210000
Panquehue	2210000
Papudo	2070000
Paredones	3270000
Parral	3630000
Pedro Aguirre Cerda	8460000
Pelarco	3500000
Pelluhue	3710000
Pemuco	3910000
Pencahue	3550000
Penco	4150000
Peñaflor	9750000
Peñalolén	7910000
Peralillo	3170000
Perquenco	4870000
Petorca	2030000
Peumo	2990000
Pica	1170000
Pichidegua	2980000
Pichilemu	3220000
Pinto	3880000
Pirque	9480000
Pitrufquén	4950000
Placilla	3100000
Portezuelo	3960000
Porvenir	6300000
Pozo Almonte	1180000
Primavera	6310000
Providencia	7500000
Puchuncaví	2500000
Pucón	4920000
Pudahuel	9020000
Puente Alto	8150000
Puerto Montt	5480000
Puerto Natales	6160000
Puerto Octay	5370000
Puerto Varas	5550000
Pumanque	3150000
Punta Arenas	6200000
Punitaqui	1900000
Purén	4750000
Purranque	5380000
Puqueldón	5760000
Putaendo	2190000
Putre	1070000
Puyehue	5360000
Queilén	5780000
Quellón	5790000
Quemchi	5720000
Quilaco	4520000
Quilicura	8700000
Quilleco	4500000
Quillón	3940000
Quillota	2260000
Quilpué	2430000
Quinchao	5750000
Quinta de Tilcoco	2960000
Quinta Normal	8500000
Quintero	2490000
Quirihue	4000000
Rancagua	2820000
Ránquil	3950000
Rauco	3430000
Recoleta	8420000
Renaico	4670000
Renca	8640000
Rengo	2940000
Requínoa	2930000
Retiro	3640000
Rinconada	2140000
Río Bueno	5240000
Río Claro	3510000
Río Hurtado	1870000
Río Ibáñez	6060000
Río Negro	5390000
Río Verde	6240000
Romeral	3370000
Saavedra	5000000
Sagrada Familia	3390000
Salamanca	1950000
San Antonio	2660000
San Bernardo	8050000
San Carlos	3840000
San Clemente	3520000
San Esteban	2120000
San Fabián de Alico	3860000
San Felipe	2170000
San Fernando	3070000
San Gregorio	6260000
San Ignacio	3890000
San Javier	3660000
San Joaquín	8940000
San José de Maipo	9460000
San Juan de la Costa	5400000
San Miguel	8900000
San Nicolás	4020000
San Pablo	5350000
San Pedro de Atacama	1410000
San Pedro de la Paz	4130000
San Rafael	3490000
San Ramón	8860000
San Rosendo	4570000
San Vicente	2970000
Santa Bárbara	4510000
Santa Cruz	3130000
Santa Juana	4230000
Santa María	2200000
Santiago	8320000
Santo Domingo	2720000
Sierra Gorda	1320000
Talagante	9670000
Talca	3460000
Talcahuano	4260000
Taltal	1300000
Temuco	4780000
Teno	3360000
Teodoro Schmidt	4990000
Tierra Amarilla	1580000
Tiltil	9420000
Timaukel	6320000
Tirúa	4410000
Tocopilla	1340000
Toltén	4980000
Tomé	4160000
Tortel	6120000
Traiguén	4730000
Treguaco	3980000
Tucapel	4480000
Valdivia	5090000
Vallenar	1610000
Valparaíso	2340000
Vichuquén	3420000
Victoria	4720000
Vicuña	1760000
Vilcún	4880000
Villa Alegre	3650000
Villa Alemana	6500000
Villarrica	4930000
Viña del Mar	2520000
Vitacura	7630000
Yerbas Buenas	3600000
Yumbel	4580000
Yungay	3920000
Zapallar	2060000

== See also ==
- Chile Address Format
- Correos de Chile
- Chile addressing directions
