= Frank Sauerbaum =

Chilean politician (born 1972)

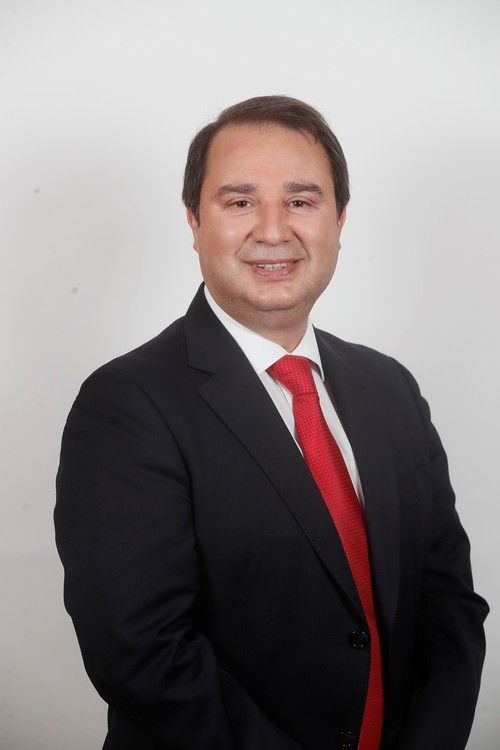

National Director of the National Migration Service
- Incumbent
- Assumed office 23 March 2026
- President: José Antonio Kast
- Preceded by: Luis Thayer

Member of the Chamber of Deputies
- In office 11 March 2018 – 11 March 2026
- Preceded by: District created
- Succeeded by: Carlos Chandía
- Constituency: District 19
- In office 11 March 2010 – 11 March 2014
- Preceded by: Loreto Carvajal
- Succeeded by: Nicolás Monckeberg
- Constituency: Bío Bío Costa (42nd District)

Personal details
- Born: 21 September 1972 (age 54) Concepción, Chile
- Party: National Renewal
- Children: Two
- Education: Catholic University of the Most Holy Conception; San Sebastián University (Lic.)
- Occupation: Economist

Frank Carlos Sauerbaum Muñoz (born 21 November 1972) is a Chilean politician. Since 23 March 2026 he has served as National Director of the National Migration Service, during José Antonio Kast's presidency.

== Biography ==
He was born in Concepción on 21 November 1972. He is the son of businessman Alberto Sauerbaum Silva and Gabriela Muñoz Ojeda. He is married to Carmen Martínez Arcos and is the father of two children, Florencia and Alberto.

He completed his primary and secondary education at the Liceo La Asunción de Talcahuano, graduating in 1989. He later studied Commercial Engineering at the Universidad Católica de la Santísima Concepción and subsequently continued the same program at the Universidad San Sebastián, where he graduated in 1998.

He holds a Master of Business Administration (MBA) from the University for Development in Concepción.

In his professional career, between 1999 and 2009, he worked as Operations Manager and Commercial Manager of Lurgi GmbH, a German company dedicated to the development of oil and gas projects. He carried out his duties in Chile, Germany, and Saudi Arabia.

== Political career ==
He began his political career in 1990 as a member of the youth wing of the National Renewal party. In 1995, he assumed the vice presidency of the organization. The following year, he was elected President of the Federation of Students of the Universidad Católica de la Santísima Concepción.

In December 2009, he was elected Deputy representing National Renewal for District No. 42 of the Biobío Region—comprising the communes of Bulnes, Cabrero, Cobquecura, Coelemu, Ninhue, Ñiquén, Portezuelo, Quillón, Quirihue, Ránquil, San Carlos, San Fabián, San Nicolás, Treguaco, and Yumbel.

In the parliamentary elections held in November 2013, he ran for re-election as a candidate for the same district representing National Renewal but was not elected.

In the parliamentary elections of 2017, he competed for a seat as Deputy representing National Renewal within the Chile Vamos pact. He was elected for the 19th District of the Ñuble Region—comprising the communes of Bulnes, Cabrero, Chillán, Chillán Viejo, Cobquecura, Coelemu, Coihueco, El Carmen, Ñiquén, Pemuco, Pinto, Portezuelo, Quillón, Quirihue, Ninhue, Ránquil, San Carlos, San Fabián, San Ignacio, San Nicolás, Treguaco, Yumbel, and Yungay—with 18,107 votes, equivalent to 9.34% of the valid votes cast.

In August 2021, he ran for re-election in the same district representing National Renewal within the Chile Podemos Más pact. In November 2021, he was re-elected as Deputy with 15,609 votes, corresponding to 9.28% of the valid votes cast.

He ran for re-election for the same district in the parliamentary elections held on 16 November 2025, representing National Renewal within the Chile Grande y Unido pact. He was not elected, obtaining 20,790 votes, equivalent to 6.30% of the total votes cast.

On 23 March 2026, he was appointed by President José Antonio Kast as National Director of the National Migration Service.
