= Ñuble Province (1974–2018) =

Ñuble Province Provincia de Ñuble
- Province
- Seal

- Location in the Bío Bío Region
- Coordinates: 36°37′00″S 71°57′00″W
- Country: Chile
- Region: Bío Bío
- Capital: Chillán
- Communes: List of 21: Bulnes; Cobquecura; Coelemu; Coihueco; Chillán; Chillán Viejo; El Carmen; Ninhue; Ñiquén; Pemuco; Pinto; Portezuelo; Quillón; Quirihue; Ránquil; San Carlos; San Fabián; San Ignacio; San Nicolás; Treguaco; Yungay

Area
  - Total: 13,178.5 km^{2} (5,088.2 sq mi)

Population (2012 Census)
  - Total: 460,113
  - Density: 34.9139/km^{2} (90.4266/sq mi)
  - Urban: 285,108
  - Rural: 152,995

Sex
  - Men: 217,024
  - Women: 221,079
- Time zone: UTC-4 (CLT)
  - Summer (DST): UTC-3 (CLST)
- Area code: 56 + 42

Ñuble Province (Spanish: Provincia de Ñuble, pronounced [ˈɲuβle]) was one of the provinces of the Chilean region of Bío Bío (VIII). It used to span an area of 13,178.5 km^{2} (5,088 sq mi) and it was administratively constituted by 21 communes. It has in 2017 a population of 441,604 inhabitants. Its capital was the city of Chillán. On the 6th of September of 2018, the province became the Ñuble Region.

== History ==
The province was created in 1974 from the territory of the historical province of Ñuble. Two years later, the communes of Coelemu and Ránquil from Concepción Province, and the commune of Tucapel from Bío Bío Province, were added.

Following the 8.8 magnitude earthquake and tsunami, at least eight small communities and two towns were abandoned by residents, who took up makeshift camps in the hills, fearful of further tsunamis. Over 800 residences in the town of Quirihue were destroyed, leaving little for townspeople to return to.

In 2015 the Ñuble Region law which converts the Ñuble Province into a Region, was proposed. In August 2017 a law to create the new territorial division was promulgated by the President of the Republic in Chillán. It became operational on 6 September 2018.

== Administration ==
As a province, Ñuble was a second-level administrative division of Chile, governed by a provincial governor who was appointed by the president.

=== Communes ===
The province used to comprise 21 communes, each governed by a municipality consisting of an elected alcalde and municipal council.

- Bulnes
- Cobquecura
- Coelemu
- Coihueco
- Chillán
- Chillán Viejo
- El Carmen
- Ninhue
- Ñiquén (San Gregorio de Ñiquén)
- Pemuco
- Pinto
- Portezuelo
- Quillón
- Quirihue
- Ránquil
- San Carlos
- San Fabián
- San Ignacio
- San Nicolás
- Treguaco
- Yungay

== See also ==
- Ñuble Region
