= Ñuble Region =

Region of Chile

Ñuble Region Región de Ñuble
- Region of Chile
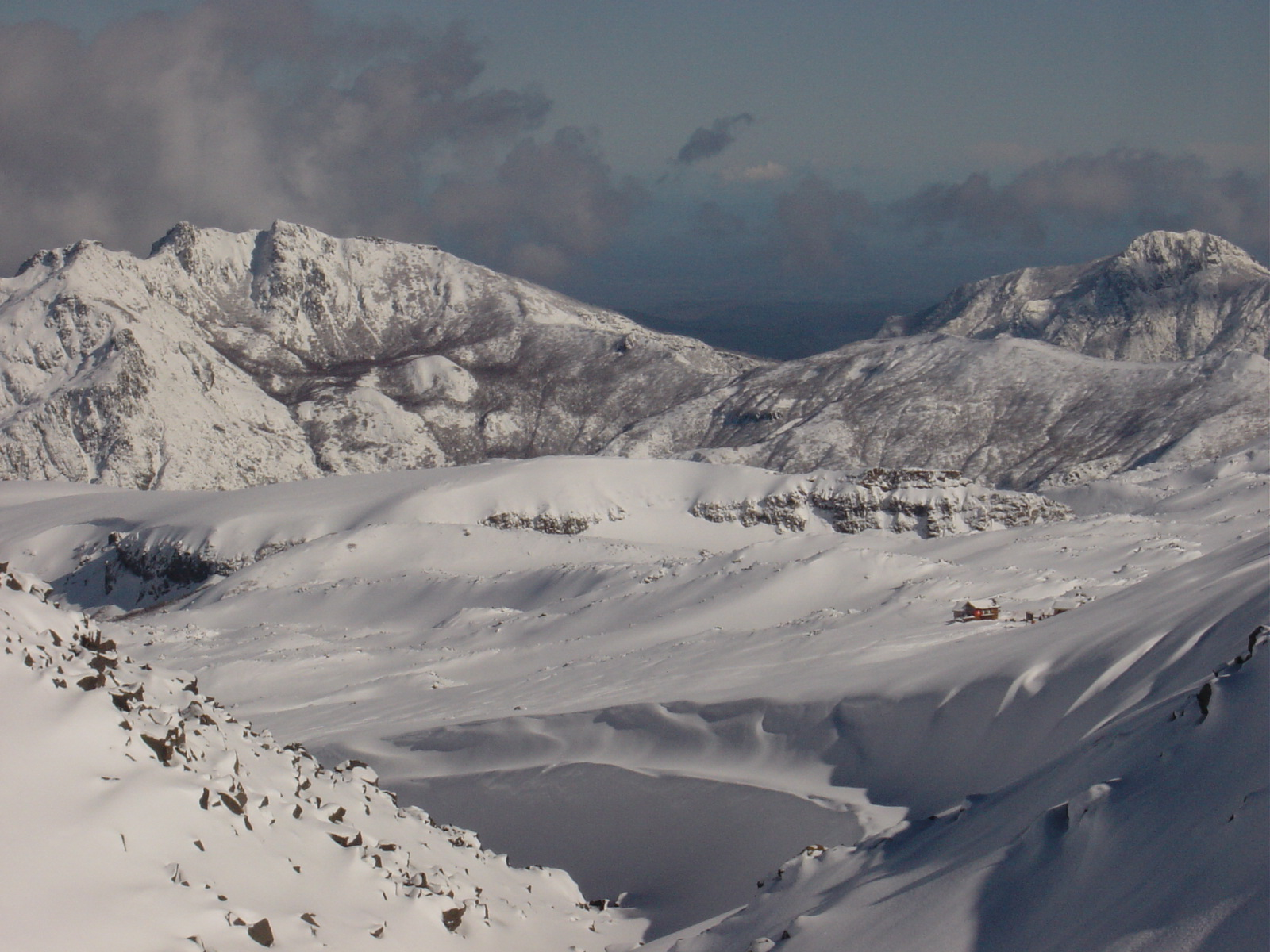
- Termas de Chillán

- Flag Seal Coat of arms

- Map of Ñuble Region
- Coordinates: 36°37′00″S 71°57′00″W
- Country: Chile
- Capital: Chillán
- Provinces: Diguillín, Itata, Punilla

Government
  - Governor: Óscar Crisóstomo (PS)
  - Presidential delegate: Diego Sepúlveda (REP)

Area
  - Total: 13,178.5 km^{2} (5,088.2 sq mi)
  - Rank: 16

Population (2024 census)
  - Total: 512,289
  - Rank: 10
  - Density: 38.8731/km^{2} (100.681/sq mi)
- Demonym: ñublense / ñublensino-a
- HDI (2019): 0.826 very high
- Website: (in Spanish) Gobierno Regional de Ñuble

The Ñuble Region (Spanish: Región de Ñuble, pronounced [ˈɲuble], from the Mapudungun Ngüflew/Ngüvlew meaning 'narrow river') officially the Region of Ñuble, is one of Chile's sixteen regions. It spans an area of 13,178.5 km^{2} (5,088 sq mi), making it the smallest region in Chile in terms of area, and is administratively constituted by 21 communes. It has a population of 512,289 inhabitants. Its capital is the city of Chillán.

The region, located in the south-central part of the country, borders the Maule Region to the north, the province of Neuquén in Argentina to the east, the Biobío Region to the south, and the Pacific Ocean to the west. Its main urban centre is Greater Chillán, comprising the city of the same name and the surrounding urban area, with a total population of 223,070, followed by San Carlos with 55,847 inhabitants.

On 19 August 2017, President Michelle Bachelet signed the decree enacting the law creating the Ñuble Region, separating it from the Biobío Region. The law was published in the Official Gazette on 5 September 2017 and came into force a year later, on 6 September 2018.

== History ==
On 2 February 1848, the former province of Ñuble was created as part of the reforms contemplated in the Political Constitution of 1833, through the merger of two former departments, the department of Chillán belonging to the former Province of Concepción and the department of San Carlos belonging to the Province of Maule. In 1974, with the regionalisation process of the military government, the former province (with regional status) was abolished and the province of Ñuble was created.

In 1995, with the creation of the commune of Chillán Viejo and the publication in the newspaper La Discusión of a document entitled Ñuble como región y la estrategia de desarrollo para implementarla (Ñuble as a region and the development strategy to implement it), the background for the creation of the Pro Ñuble Region Committee on 18 May 1997, which would later be renamed simply ‘Ñuble Region’, whose general council was made up of the 21 mayors of the province. This organisation was a citizens' movement that took more than 21 years to achieve its ultimate goal, as it was the only visible entity in the creation of the new region, with mayors, councillors, parliamentarians and social leaders as its main allies in its work and dissemination.

During Ricardo Lagos' administration, in 2003, a document was created at the Pontifical Catholic University entitled Diagnóstico y propuesta metodológica para modificar la división político administrativa del país (Diagnosis and methodological proposal to modify the political-administrative division of the country), whose analysis investigated the strengths of the then provinces of Arica, Ñuble, and Valdivia, determining that all three provinces had favourable aspects. However, in 2007, only the regions of Arica and Parinacota and Los Ríos were approved. In 2011, the possibility of including the communes of Parral, Cabrero and Yumbel in the bill was raised, but it did not prosper. In 2014, during Sebastián Piñera's first term in office, the University of Concepción conducted a study entitled Línea base, consideraciones y propuestas para determinar pertinencia de creación de nueva Región de Ñuble (Baseline, considerations and proposals to determine the relevance of creating a new Ñuble Region).

Although the proposals that were successful in heading the provinces are Bulnes, Quirihue and San Carlos, there were other proposals such as Chillán Viejo and Yungay in Diguillín and Coelemu and Trehuaco in Itata. Added to this was the intention of the commune of Quillón to move from the province of Itata to Diguillín and Coihueco from Diguillín to Punilla.

On 20 August 2015, President Michelle Bachelet signed the bill creating the Ñuble region in the Schaeffer Room of the University of Bío-Bío Extension Centre in Chillán. Its legislative process began on 1 September 2015, and on 10 January 2017, the bill was approved in its first constitutional stage in the Senate with 28 votes in favour and two against. The bill then moved on to the Chamber of Deputies, where it was approved and dispatched on 5 July of the same year. On 12 July 2017, this bill was approved by the Senate, with 26 votes in favour and only two against.

In 2017, following its approval by the National Congress, Deputy Marcelo Chávez sent the bill to the Constitutional Court of Chile, considering three articles to be unconstitutional: proportionality with regard to the number of senators from the region, regional councillors elected for the Biobío Region would move to the new region, and the lack of consultation with indigenous peoples. Senator Felipe Harboe defended the bill. The court approved the creation of the Ñuble region on 2 August 2017, and on 19 August of the same year, the law was signed by President Michelle Bachelet at the Casa del Deporte in Chillán. In September 2017, the law was published in the Official Gazette, noting that the new region would not be valid until 6 September 2018.

Some groups opposed to the creation of the region argue that it is a recent regionalism, without historical or cultural roots, arising mainly for economic reasons as a way to receive more resources from the central government. However, this would also have repercussions when recalculating the distribution of the public budget, as it would ultimately be the smallest region in terms of surface area and also one of the smallest regional populations, putting it at a disadvantage compared to other regions in its capacity as a higher territorial division of the country. The Biobío Region, with its borders at that time, was the second most populated and industrialised region in Chile, after the Metropolitan Region.

Artisanal fishermen in the provinces of Arauco, Concepción and Ñuble expressed their concern about the limitations that operating within the new regional boundaries would entail, in accordance with the provisions established by legislation and regulated at the national level by the Undersecretary of Fisheries.

This region has played a distinguished role in the history and culture of Chile. Many patriots who fought for independence, presidents, politicians, and artists, like pianist Claudio Arrau and folklorist Violeta Parra, were born here.

== Geography ==
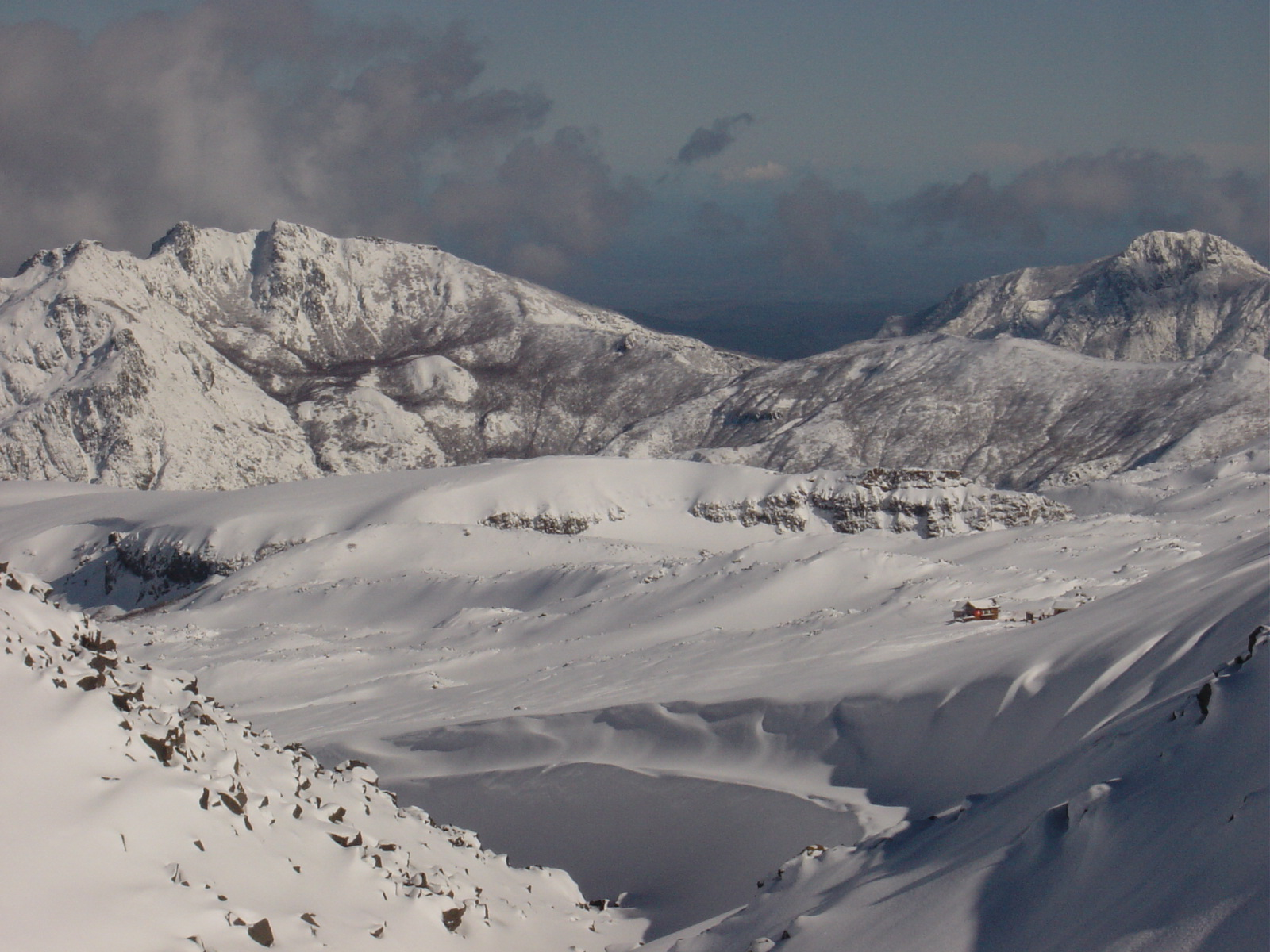
View of the Termas de Chillán ski center

The region features the four longitudinal strips of relief typical of Central Chile.

=== Andes Mountain Range ===
It appears massive but lower than in more northern areas, with an average elevation below 3,000 m above sea level and strong volcanic activity. Its highest point is the Nevados de Chillán (3,212 m above sea level). It is preceded by the pre-Andean relief known as La Montaña.

=== Intermediate Depression ===
It reaches one of its greatest widths in the area closest to Chillán, at nearly 100 km. A large amount of water resources is concentrated here, enabling forestry, agricultural, and livestock activities, based on the fluvial systems of the Itata the Ñuble River. In this geomorphological unit, glacio–fluvio–volcanic sediments predominate.

=== Coastal Mountain Range ===
It appears depressed, with average elevations of around 500 m above sea level. Its most important hills are Coiquén (902 m) and Cayumanqui (762 m above sea level). It also features intermontane basins with drier microclimates, such as Quirihue and Quillón.

=== Coastal Plains ===
In this region they show limited development and are clearly evident only in the areas of Cobquecura and at the mouth of the Itata River.

=== Hydrography ===
The region has at its center the Itata River basin, with a nival–pluvial regime, which drains most of the region’s surface. Politically, the southern end of the Maule River basin belongs to the Ñuble Region, just as the southern end of the Itata basin belongs to the Biobío Region. In the coastal zone, within the coastal basins between the regional boundary and the Itata River, the Taucú, Cobquecura, and Buchupureo rivers develop.

== Demography ==
According to the 2024 census by the National Statistics Institute (INE), the region spans an area of 13,178.5 km^{2} (5,088 sq mi) with a population of 512,289 inhabitants (246,437 men and 265,852 women), giving it a population density of 38.87/km^{2} (101/sq mi).

The most populated city in the region is the Greater Chillán conurbation, with a population of 223,070 inhabitants according to the 2024 census. This corresponds to the union of the cities of Chillán (190,382 inhabitants) and Chillán Viejo (32,688 inhabitants).

The next most populated cities are San Carlos with 55,847 inhabitants, Coihueco with 29,766, Bulnes with 23,863 inhabitants, and Yungay with 18,680 inhabitants, all of them located in the Intermediate Depression. Coelemu, with 15,895 inhabitants, is located in the Coastal Mountain Range, near the Itata River.

In 2021, the Rural Quality of Life Indicators System (Sistema de Indicadores de Calidad de Vida Rural, SICVIR) and the Rural Atlas of the Chilean Ministry of Agriculture and the National Statistics Institute revealed that 62% of the region’s population is considered rural, and that 96% of the region is considered rural in terms of physical geography, with only the commune of Chillán considered entirely urban.

Other aspects are also highlighted, such as the population living in poverty, where the commune of Cobquecura has the highest proportion at the regional level, with 36% of its population, followed by El Carmen with 29%; and the lack of sewerage in the commune of Ninhue, affecting 70% of the total administrative division.

Most populated localities (2024)
Rank	Commune	Province	Population
1.	Greater Chillan	Diguillín	223,070
2.	San Carlos	Punilla	55,847
3.	Coihueco	Punilla	29,766
4.	Bulnes	Diguillín	23,863
5.	Quillón	Diguillín	19,165
6.	Yungay	Diguillín	18,680
7.	San Ignacio	Diguillín	17,405
8.	Coelemu	Itata	15,895
9.	El Carmen	Diguillín	13,186
10.	Quirihue	Itata	11,746

== Provinces and communes ==
The Ñuble Region has 3 provinces and 21 communes.

Communes of the Ñuble Region

Province	Capital	Commune
Itata	Quirihue	1 Cobquecura
Itata	Quirihue	2 Coelemu
Itata	Quirihue	3 Ninhue
Itata	Quirihue	4 Portezuelo
Itata	Quirihue	5 Quirihue
Itata	Quirihue	6 Ránquil
Itata	Quirihue	7 Treguaco
Diguillín	Bulnes	8 Bulnes
Diguillín	Bulnes	9 Chillán Viejo
Diguillín	Bulnes	10 Chillán
Diguillín	Bulnes	11 El Carmen
Diguillín	Bulnes	12 Pemuco
Diguillín	Bulnes	13 Pinto
Diguillín	Bulnes	14 Quillón
Diguillín	Bulnes	15 San Ignacio
Diguillín	Bulnes	16 Yungay
Punilla	San Carlos	17 Coihueco
Punilla	San Carlos	18 Ñiquén
Punilla	San Carlos	19 San Carlos
Punilla	San Carlos	20 San Fabián
Punilla	San Carlos	21 San Nicolás

== Governance ==
According to a 2021 study Ñuble Region is one of the three Chilean regions that are most prone to suffer nepotism and elite capture.

== Culture and tourism ==
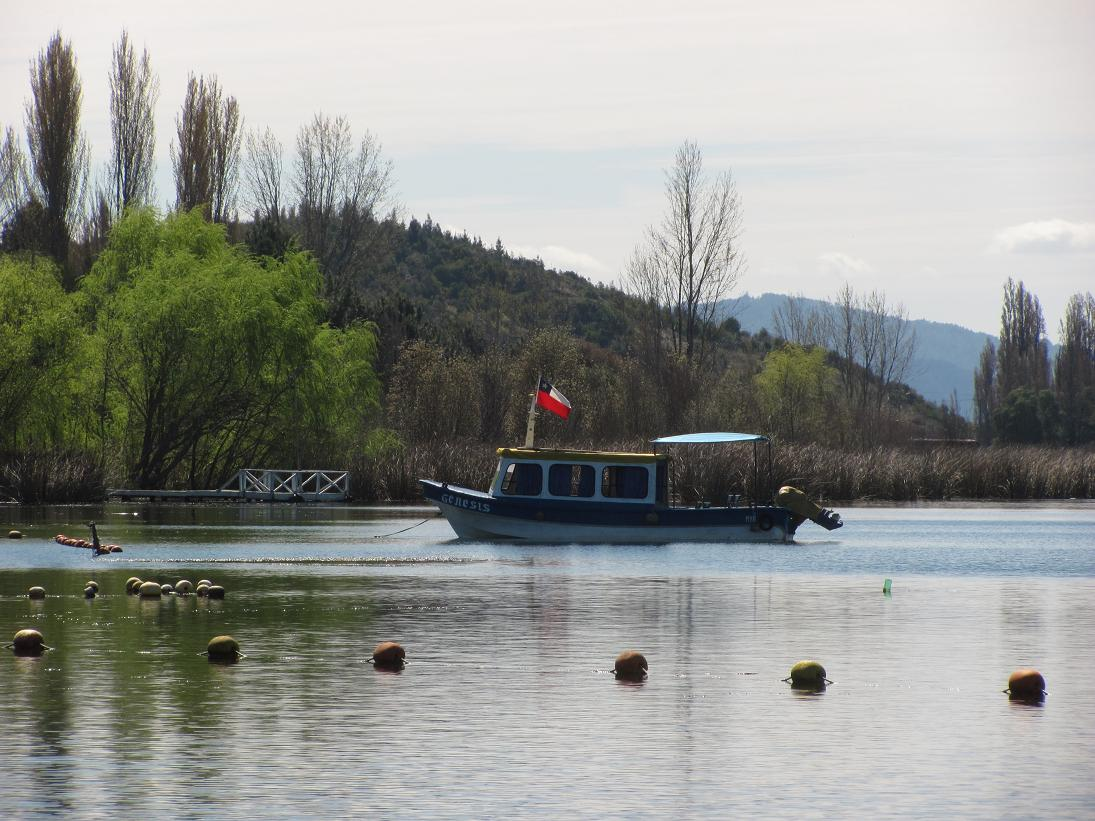
Avendaño Lake located in Quillón.

Ñuble has a lot of attractions for tourists, including:

- The Termas de Chillán is a major winter and summer tourist complex of the region, located among millenarian forests and inexhaustible thermal water sources.
- The commune of Pinto, located 24 km (15 mi) to the southeast of Chillán, is an agricultural area with some beautiful rural areas where native flora and fauna can be found.
- The Lleuques is a cordillerano bath located next to the Rengado River and which has beautiful places surrounded by mountains.
- Cobquecura located in the coastal sector, and has several beaches and places to make excursions (like the Calvario Hill).
- The commune of Quillón is home of the Avendaño Lagoon, for water-skiing, swimming, sailing, and rowing.
- The commune San Fabián de Alico, has beautiful landscapes is an excellent locality for excursions, camping and fishing.

Other places of interest are the Market and Fair of Chillán, one of the more beautiful and important artisan centers of Chile. Murals by Siqueiros were donated by the Government of Mexico. There is also Bernardo O'Higgins Monumental Park in the locality of Chillán Viejo.

Among the activities characteristic of Ñuble are crafts, in particular in the localities of Quinchamalí (considered like one of the country's more important places of artisan production of white clay pottery), Coihueco (characterized by the wood carvings and loom weaving), Ninhue and San Fabián de Alico.

In recent years Ñuble has consolidated an important forest sector, thanks to favorable climatic conditions land for the development of plantations of such rapidly growing trees as pinus radiata and eucalyptus globulus.

Ñuble has a variety of celebrations and events. Outstanding among these are the Rodeo, a celebration huasa that takes place between September and February. The Agro-Expo of San Carlos is an agricultural, cattle and artisan exhibition, with strong accent on dairying.

- The Carnival of Quillón, traditional celebration with artistic spectacles and dances.
- The Celebration of the Vendimia, the celebration of autumn in the locality of Santacruz de Cuca.
- The Festival of Creole Roots in Coihueco, which revives folkloric traditions.
- The gathering of Folkloric Roots of Portezuelo in the month of November brings together an important group of singers, artisan and cultural singers and expressions of rural sectors of Ñuble and the country.
- The celebrations of the Cherry and Esquila; this first occurs in December in Quinchamalí, with typical folkloric activities, meals, exhibitions and tasting of cherries, jams and liqueurs; second the Cardal "in the commune of Yungay takes place in the sector".

The region has the pride of being the home of patriots, artists and other men of note, including, Bernardo O'Higgins, Arturo Prat, Claudio Arrau, Ramón Vinay, and Violeta Parra.

Chillán, the capital of Ñuble, may be reached by the following routes:

- By automobile: From Santiago: towards the south by Route 5 (Pan-American Highway), they are 399 km (248 mi) of freeway. From Concepción: towards the east by route 152, they are 112 km (70 mi) of freeway.
- In airplane: Concepción is the nearest airport.
- In train: Terrasur of EFE (the national railway) Av. Brazil s/n Chillán Station.

== Itata Valley wine region ==
The Itata Valley is a wine region in southern Chile and a Denomination of Origin (DO) is defined by the Chilean Appellation system, the legally defined and protected geographical indication used to identify where the grapes for a wine were grown. The valley is located in Ñuble, 420 kilometres (260 miles) from Santiago, the capital of Chile, and 65 kilometres (40 miles) of the major port of Concepción. It is the northernmost of Chile's three southern wine regions and stretches roughly 60 miles (97 km) from north to south and a similar distance from east to west, but although it is extensive, it has a low density of vineyard plantations. The area is defined by the convergence of the Itata and Ñuble Rivers, and vineyards plantations are mostly found around the towns of Chillan, Quillon and Coelemu. The valley's western border is the Pacific Ocean, which has a cooling influence over the valley due to the cold Humboldt current that runs along most of Chile's coastline. The cool Mediterranean climate suits Pais, Muscat of Alexandria and Carignan vines, and more recently, producers have begun to plant more modern grape varieties like Cabernet Sauvignon.

The soils are alluvial, made up of sand and clay from the Itata and Ñuble rivers. The region is located at a latitude of 36°S, a similar distance from the Equator as southern Spain or the central valley of California.

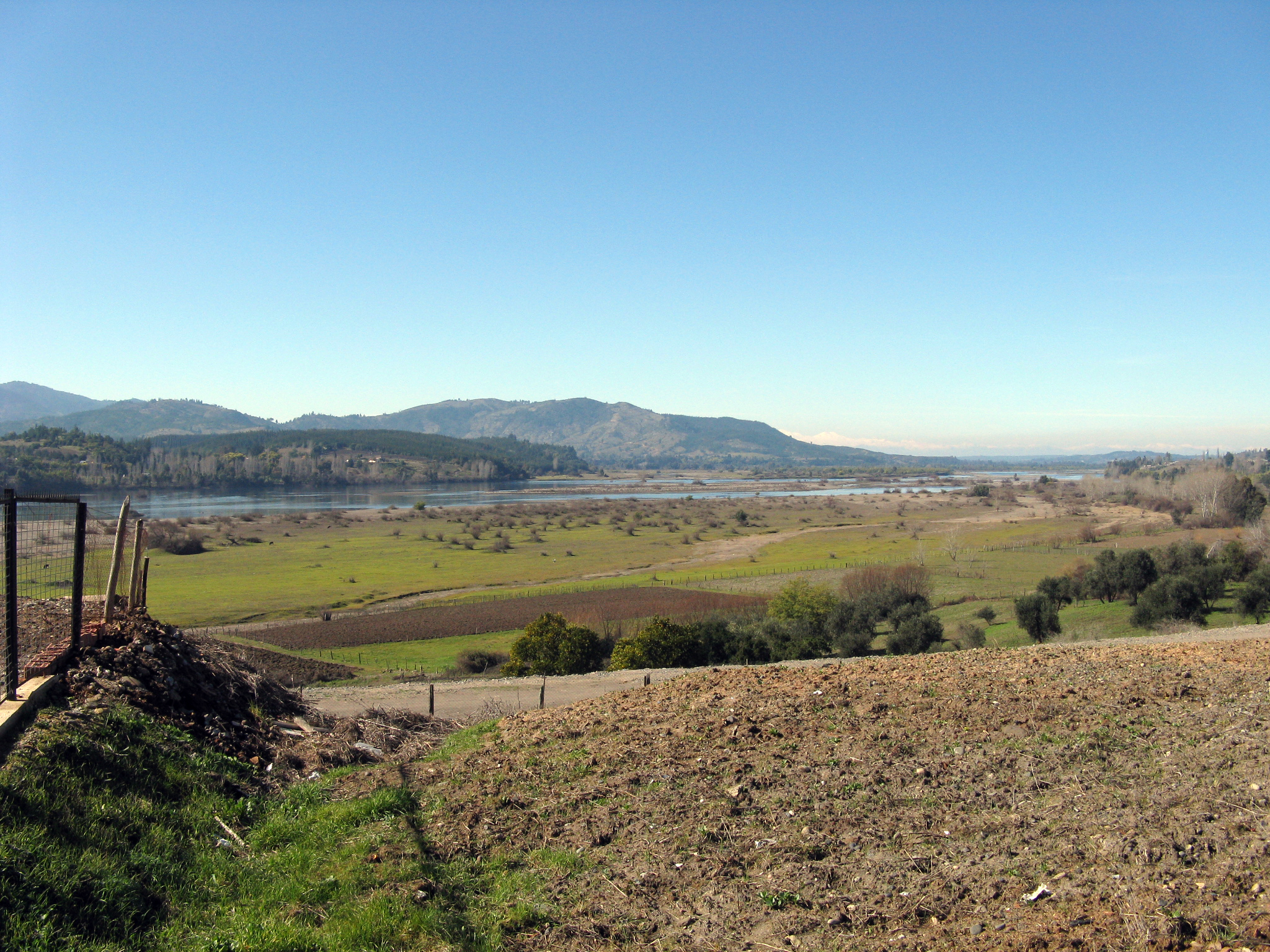
View of Itata River

=== Grape distribution by varietal ===
- Climate: Cool Mediterranean climate. 1,100 mm (43 in) of rain per year.
- Soils: Alluvial soils, clay and sand.
- Primary wines: Cabernet Sauvignon, Pais and Carignan.

Cabernet Sauvignon: 442 hectares (1,090 acres)	Moscatel de Alexandria: 5,576 hectares (13,780 acres)	Mission: 4,572 hectares (11,300 acres)
Carignan: 98 hectares (240 acres)	Semillon: 87 hectares (210 acres)	

Total hectares planted: 636 hectares (1,570 acres).

== See also ==
- Chilean wine
- Maule Region
- Maule River
- Maipo Valley
