= Chillán conurbation =

Conurbation in Ñuble Region, Chile

Coordinates: 36.6208787°S 72.12234341°W

Chillán conurbation or Gran Chillán (Greater Chillan) is a Chilean conurbation formatted for the communes of Chillán and Chillán Viejo in Diguillin Province in Ñuble Region.
