= Punilla =

Punilla Province Provincia de Punilla
- Province
- Seal

- Location in the Ñuble Region

- Location in Chile
- Country: Chile
- Region: Ñuble
- Capital: San Carlos
- Communes: List of 5

Government
  - Governor: Cristóbal Martínez

Area
  - Total: 5,249.83 km^{2} (2,026.97 sq mi)

Population (2024)
  - Total: 118,754
  - Density: 22.6205/km^{2} (58.5869/sq mi)
- Time zone: UTC−4 (CLT)
  - Summer (DST): UTC−3 (CLST)

Punilla Province is one of the three provinces of the Ñuble Region in Chile. Its capital is San Carlos. Spread over an area of 5,249.83 km^{2} (2,026.97 sq mi), it had a population of 118,754 inhabitants as per the 2024 Chilean census. The province was established by law on 5 September 2017 and came into effect from 6 September 2018.

== History ==
The Ñuble Region was established by Law 21.033 enacted on 5 September 2017 and came into effect on 6 September 2018. It is divided into three provinces: Diguillín, Punilla, and Itata Provinces, which are further divided into 21 communes.

The name Punila means "place in elevated territory or in the heights", derived from Mapuche language.

== Geography ==
Itata Province is one of the three provinces of the Ñuble Region in Chile. It is spread over an area of 2,758.4 km^{2} (1,065.0 sq mi), and has its capital at San Carlos. About 82% of the land area is part of the Itata River basin, and the remaining area forms part of the Maule River basin. The province extends from the foothills of the Andes mountains to the central valleys of Chile. Its economy is mainly based on agriculture.

The province is divided into five communes–San Carlos, San Nicolás, San Fabián, Coihueco, and Ñiquén.

=== Climate ===
Located at an altitude of 177.91 m (583.7 ft), San Carlos has a Mediterranean climate (Classification: Csb) with an average annual temperature of 16.87 °C (62.37 °F). It receives an average of 125.75 mm (4.951 in) of precipitation annually.

== Demographics ==
According to the 2024 Chilean census, Punilla Province had a population of 118,754 inhabitants. The population consisted of 60,827 females (51.2%) and 57,927 males (48.8%). About 17.3% of the population was below the age of 15 years, 65.8% belonged to the age group of 15–64 years, and 16.9% was aged 65 years or older. The province had a rural population of 67,141 inhabitants (56.5%) and an urban population of 51,613 inhabitants (43.5%). Most of the residents were born in Chile, accounting for 117,284 inhabitants (98.8%). Non-indigenous people formed the majority of the population with 114,433 inhabitants (96.4%), while 4,314 inhabitants (3.6%) identified themselves as belonging to indigenous groups. Roman Catholics formed the largest religious group with 52,015 adherents (53.1%), followed by Evangelicals or Protestants with 25,359 adherents (25.9%), and 18,569 inhabitants (19%) indicating no religious affiliation.
