= Itata Province =

Itata Province Provincia de Itata
- Province
- Seal

- Location in the Ñuble Region

- Location in Chile
- Country: Chile
- Region: Ñuble
- Capital: Quirihue
- Communes: List of 7

Area
  - Total: 2,758.4 km^{2} (1,065.0 sq mi)

Population (2024)
  - Total: 56,734
  - Density: 20.568/km^{2} (53.270/sq mi)
- Time zone: UTC−4 (CLT)
  - Summer (DST): UTC−3 (CLST)

The Itata Province is one of the three provinces of the Ñuble Region in Chile. Its capital is Quirihue. Spread over an area of 2,758.4 km^{2} (1,065.0 sq mi), it had a population of 56,734 inhabitants as per the 2024 Chilean census. The province was established by law on 5 September 2017 and came into effect from 6 September 2018.

== History ==
The Ñuble Region was established by Law 21.033 enacted on 5 September 2017 and came into effect on 6 September 2018. It is divided into three provinces: Diguillín, Punilla and Itata Provinces, which are further divided into 21 communes.

The name Itata means "abundance of water" in Mapudungún, which is a reference to the Itata River, which crosses the province.

== Geography ==
Itata Province is one of the three provinces of the Ñuble Region in Chile. It is spread over an area of 2,758.4 km^{2} (1,065.0 sq mi), and has its capital at Quirihue. About 60% of the land area is part of the Itata River basin, and 12% of the area forms part of the Maule River basin, with the coastal area forming the remaining land area of the province. The province is a major wine making center in the Ñuble Region, due to the presence of the fertile Itata river valley.

The province is divided into seven communes–Quirihue, Cobquecura, Ninhue, Treguaco, Portezuelo, Coelemu, and Ránquil.

== Demographics ==
According to the 2024 Chilean census, Itata Province had a population of 56,734 inhabitants. The population consisted of 28,911 females (50.9%) and 27,823 males (49.1%). About 15.7% of the population was below the age of 15 years, 64.0% belonged to the age group of 15–64 years, and 20.2% was aged 65 years or older. The province had an urban population of 29,729 inhabitants (52.4%) and a rural population of 27,005 inhabitants (47.6%). Most of the residents were born in Chile, accounting for 56,435 inhabitants (99.5%). Non-indigenous people formed the majority of the population with 54,503 inhabitants (96.1%), while 2,229 inhabitants (3.9%) identified themselves as belonging to indigenous groups. Roman Catholics formed the largest religious group with 24,266 adherents (50.8%), followed by Evangelicals or Protestants with 15,041 adherents (31.5%), and 7,644 inhabitants (16%) indicating no religious affiliation.
