= La Discusión =

Chilean newspaper

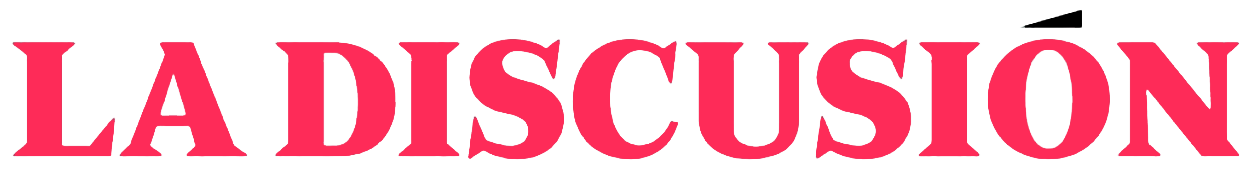

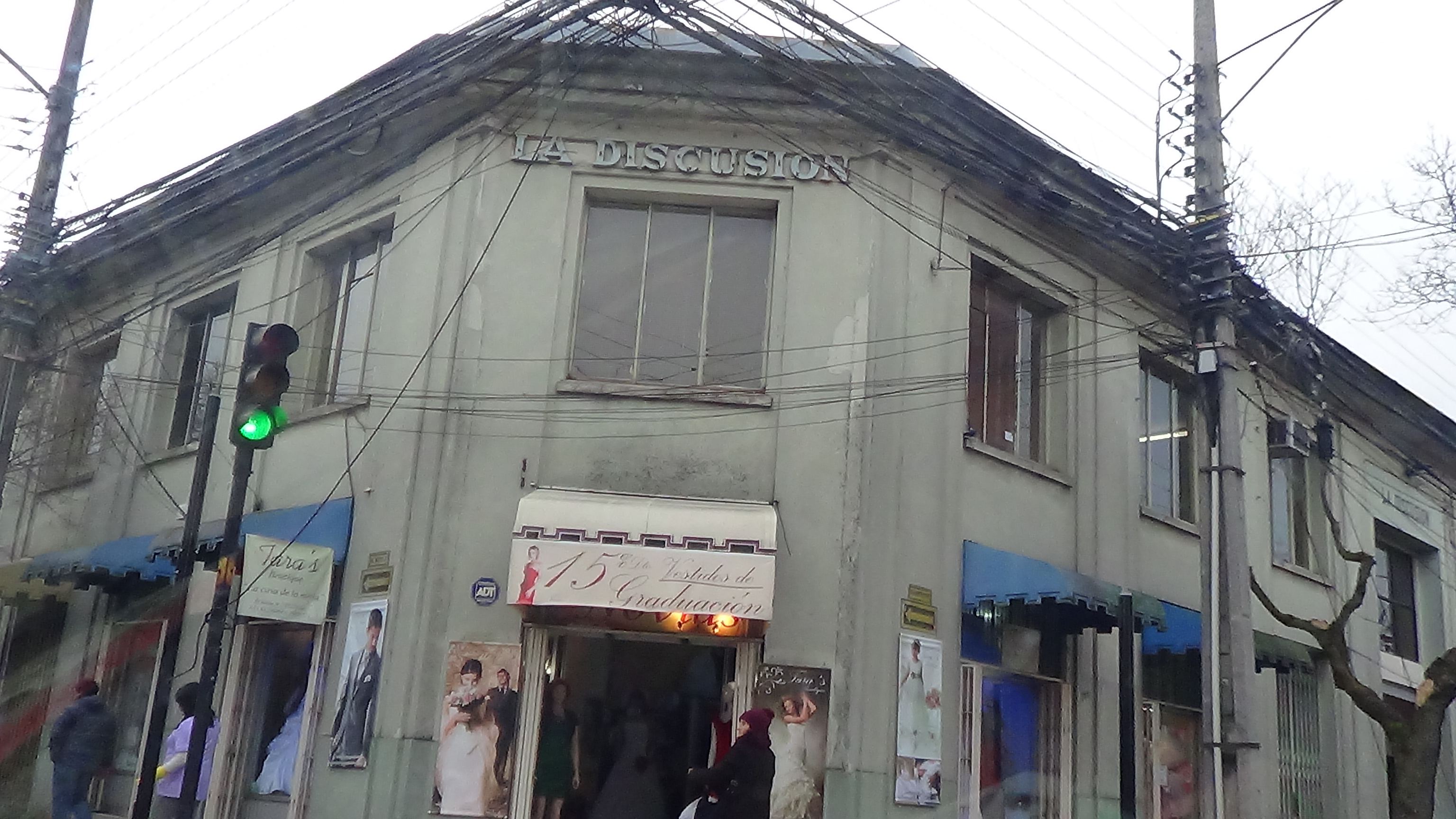
- La Discusión building
- Type: Daily newspaper
- Founded: February 5, 1870; 156 years ago
- Language: Spanish

La Discusión is a Spanish newspaper published from Chile. It is the second oldest newspaper still in circulation in Chile, after El Mercurio de Valparaíso.It was founded by Juan Ignacio Montenegro.
