= Cabrero, Chile =

Cabrero
- City and Commune
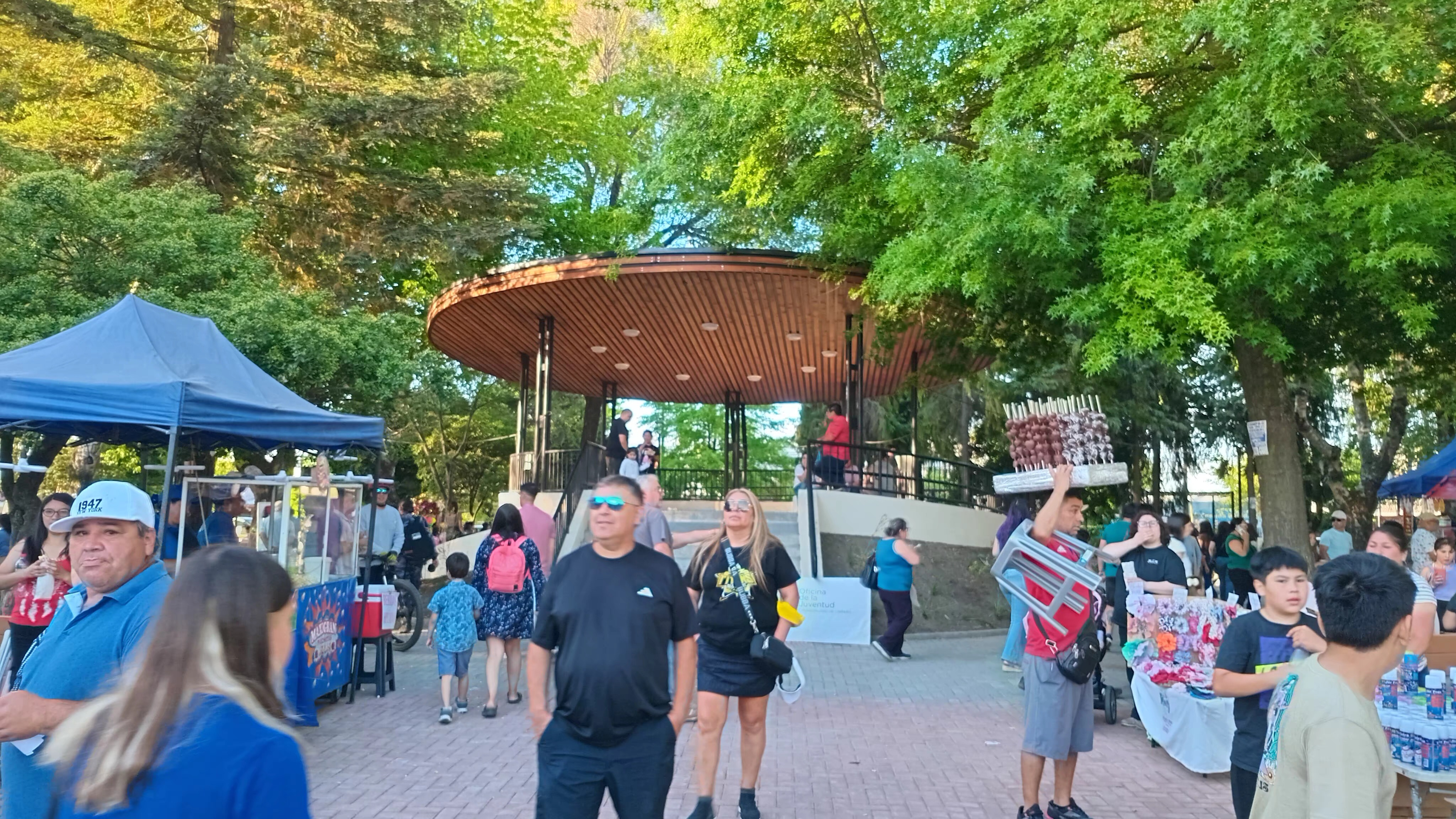
- Cabrero Main Square (2024)

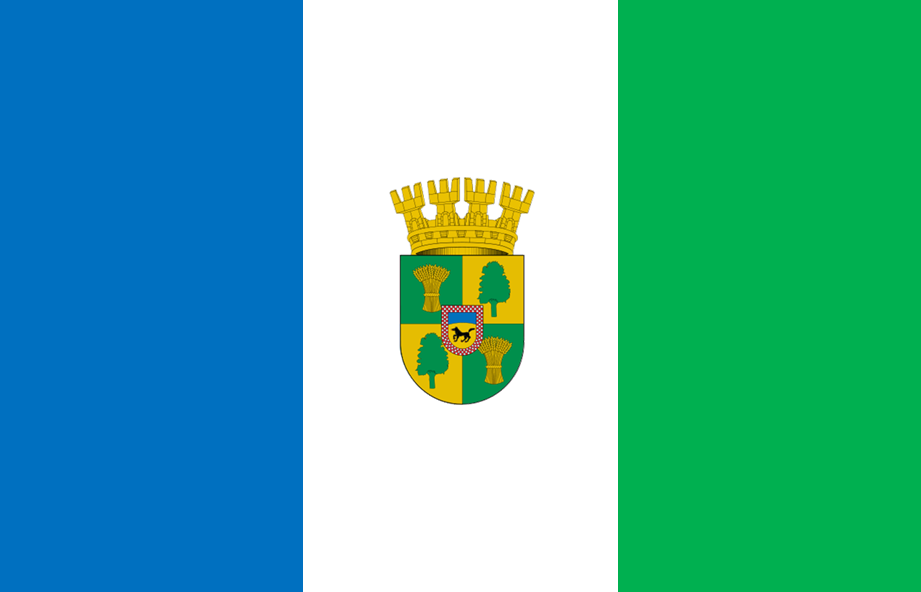
- Flag Coat of arms Location of Cabrero commune in Biobío Region Location in Chile
- Coordinates: 37°2′S 72°24′W
- Country: Chile
- Region: Biobío
- Province: Biobío

Government
  - Type: Municipality
  - Mayor: Yusef Sabag (Ind.)

Area
  - Total: 639.8 km^{2} (247.0 sq mi)
- Elevation: 115 m (377 ft)

Population (2012 Census)
  - Total: 27,595
  - Density: 43.13/km^{2} (111.7/sq mi)
  - Urban: 18,037
  - Rural: 7,245

Sex
  - Men: 12,888
  - Women: 12,394
- Time zone: UTC−4 (CLT)
  - Summer (DST): UTC−3 (CLST)
- Area code: 56 + 43
- Website: Municipality of Cabrero

Cabrero is a city and commune in the Biobío Province, Biobío Region, Chile.

== History ==
The city of Cabrero, has its origins in the progressive group of people, which established a station to serve the needs of the inhabitants of several rural properties in the area, and then the arrival of immigrants mainly from Middle East and Italy.

== Demography ==
According to the 2002 census of the National Statistics Institute, Cabrero spans an area of 639.8 km^{2} (247 sq mi) and has 25,282 inhabitants (12,888 men and 12,394 women), corresponding to 1.25% of total regional population and a density of 39.52 inhabitants per km2. A 3.35% (7,245 pop.) Of these, 18,037 (71.3%) lived in urban areas and 7,245 (28.7%) in rural areas. The population grew by 16.5% (3,577 persons) between the 1992 and 2002 censuses.

== Government ==
As a commune, Cabrero is a third-level administrative division of Chile administered by a municipal council, headed by a mayor who is directly elected every four years. The mayor for the 2024-2030 term is Yusef Sabag (Ind.), while the councilors are:

- Sebastián Guenante (REP)
- Miguel San Martín (REP)
- Mauricio Rodriguez (PCC)
- Pedro Esparza (Ind./EVOP)
- Michael Esparza (Ind.)
- Jorge Hernández (DC)

Within the electoral divisions of Chile, Cabrero is represented in the Chamber of Deputies by Jorge Sabag (PDC) and Frank Sauerbaum (RN) as part of the 42nd electoral district, together with San Fabián, Ñiquén, San Carlos, San Nicolás, Ninhue, Quirihue, Cobquecura, Treguaco, Portezuelo, Coelemu, Ránquil, Quillón, Bulnes and Yumbel. The commune is represented in the Senate by Alejandro Navarro Brain (MAS) and Hosain Sabag Castillo (PDC) as part of the 12th senatorial constituency (Biobío-Cordillera).

== Tourism ==
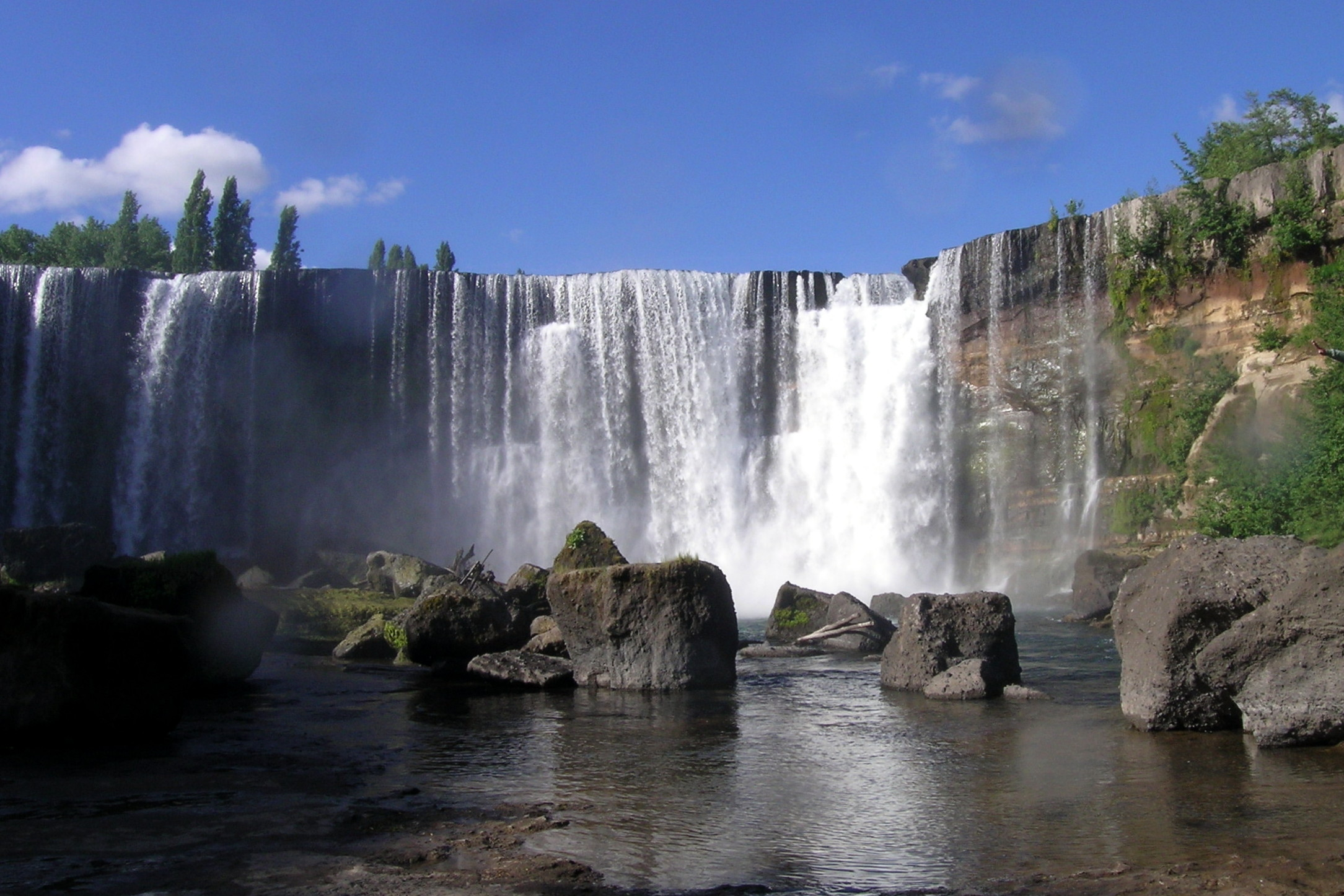
Principal fall at Laja Falls

The western half of the Laja Falls lies within the commune of Cabrero and is located about 25 km south of the city of Cabrero. It is one of the Biobío Region's main tourist attractions.
