= San Nicolás, Chile =

San Nicolás
- Town and Commune
- Coat of arms

- Commune of San Nicolás in the Ñuble Region

- Location in Chile
- Coordinates: 36°30′12″S 72°12′44″W
- Country: Chile
- Region: Ñuble
- Province: Punilla

Government
  - Type: Municipality
  - Alcalde: Víctor Ramón Toro Leiva (PDC)

Area
  - Total: 490.5 km^{2} (189.4 sq mi)
- Elevation: 75 m (246 ft)

Population (2012 Census)
  - Total: 10,631
  - Density: 21.67/km^{2} (56.13/sq mi)
  - Urban: 3,428
  - Rural: 6,313
- Demonym: Sannicolasino

Sex
  - Men: 5,032
  - Women: 4,709
- Time zone: UTC-4 (CLT)
  - Summer (DST): UTC-3 (CLST)
- Area code: country 56 + city 42
- Website: Municipality of San Nicolás

San Nicolás is a Chilean town and commune in Punilla Province, Ñuble Region.

== Demographics ==
According to the 2002 census of the National Statistics Institute, San Nicolás spans an area of 490.5 km^{2} (189 sq mi) and has 9,741 inhabitants (5,032 men and 4,709 women). Of these, 3,428 (35.2%) lived in urban areas and 6,313 (64.8%) in rural areas. Between the 1992 and 2002 censuses, the population grew by 2.6% (246 persons).

== Administration ==
As a commune, San Nicolás is a third-level administrative division of Chile administered by a municipal council, headed by an alcalde who is directly elected every four years. The 2008–2012 alcalde is Víctor Ramón Toro Leiva (PDC).The municipal council has the following members:

- Feliciano Arnoldo Parra Pérez (PDC)
- Elena Rivas Toro (PRI)
- Rogelio Hernandez Gonzalez (PS)
- Luis Antonio Guzmán Álvarez (RN)
- Ramón Toro Leiva (PDC)
- Manuel Bello Núñez (PPD)

Within the electoral divisions of Chile, San Nicolás is represented in the Chamber of Deputies by Jorge Sabag (PDC) and Frank Sauerbaum (RN) as part of the 42nd electoral district, together with San Fabián, Ñiquén, San Carlos, Ninhue, Quirihue, Cobquecura, Treguaco, Portezuelo, Coelemu, Ránquil, Quillón, Bulnes, Cabrero and Yumbel. The commune is represented in the Senate by Alejandro Navarro Brain (MAS) and Hosain Sabag Castillo (PDC) as part of the 12th senatorial constituency (Biobío-Cordillera).
