= Yumbel =

- City and Commune
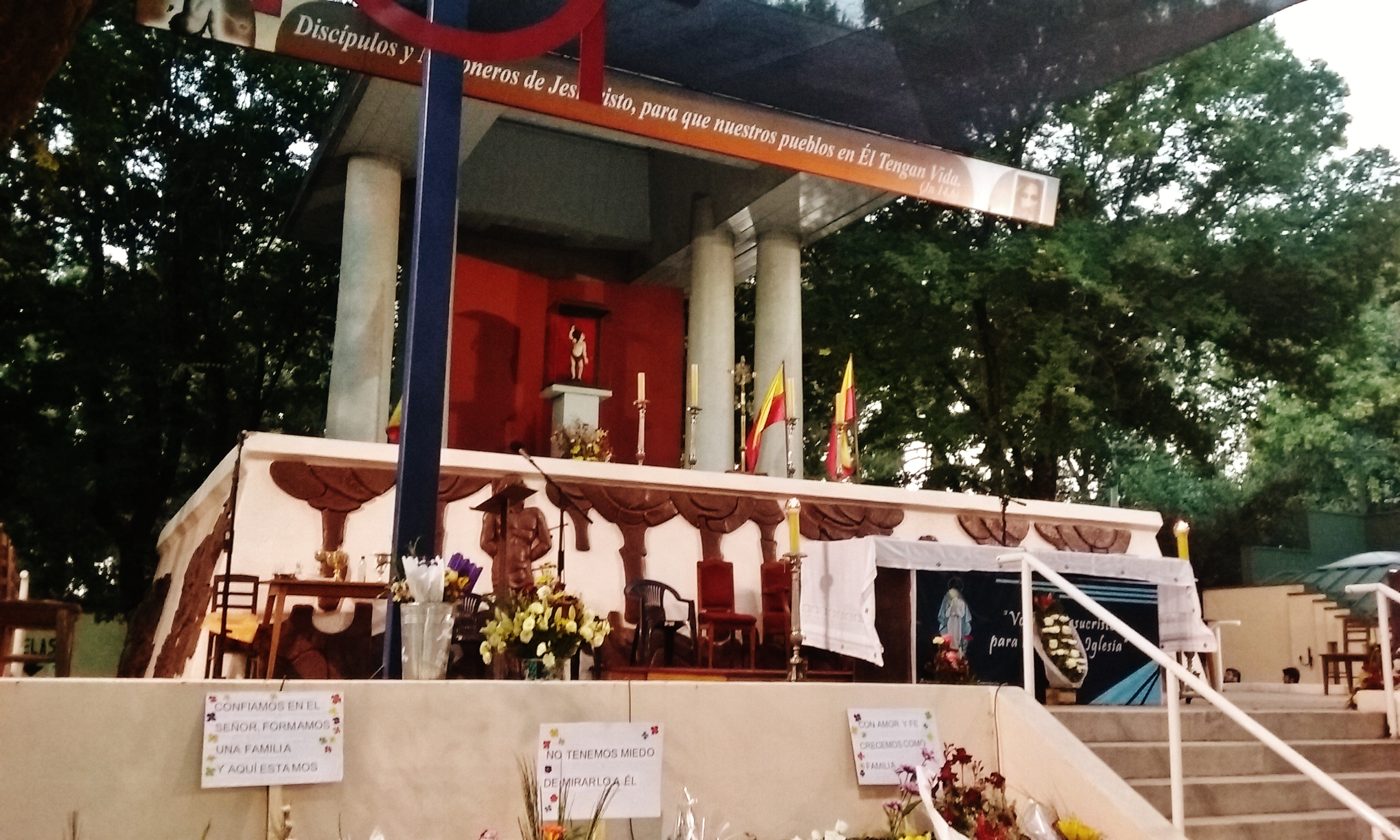
- Traditional religious holiday of St. Sebastián of Yumbel.

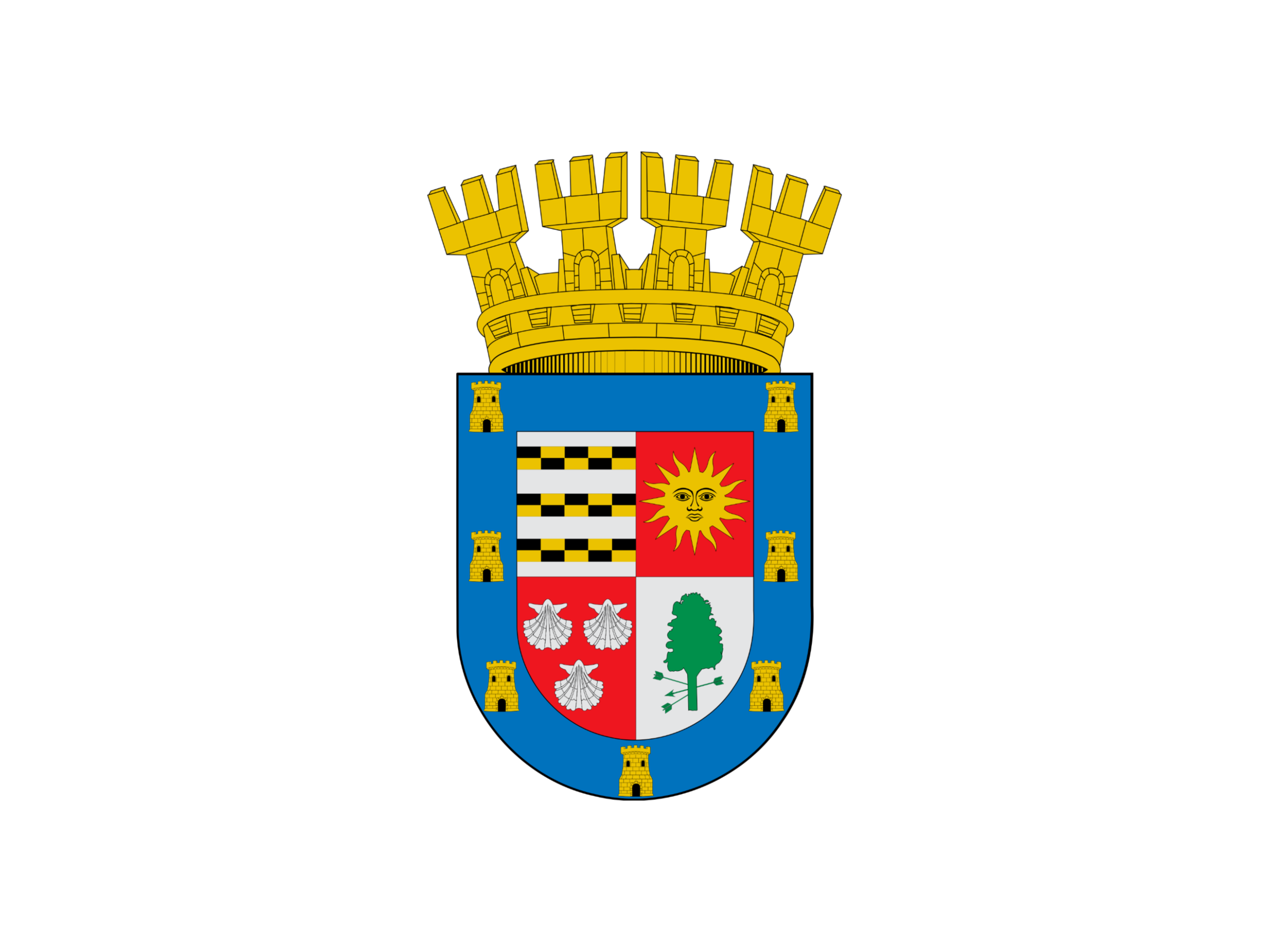
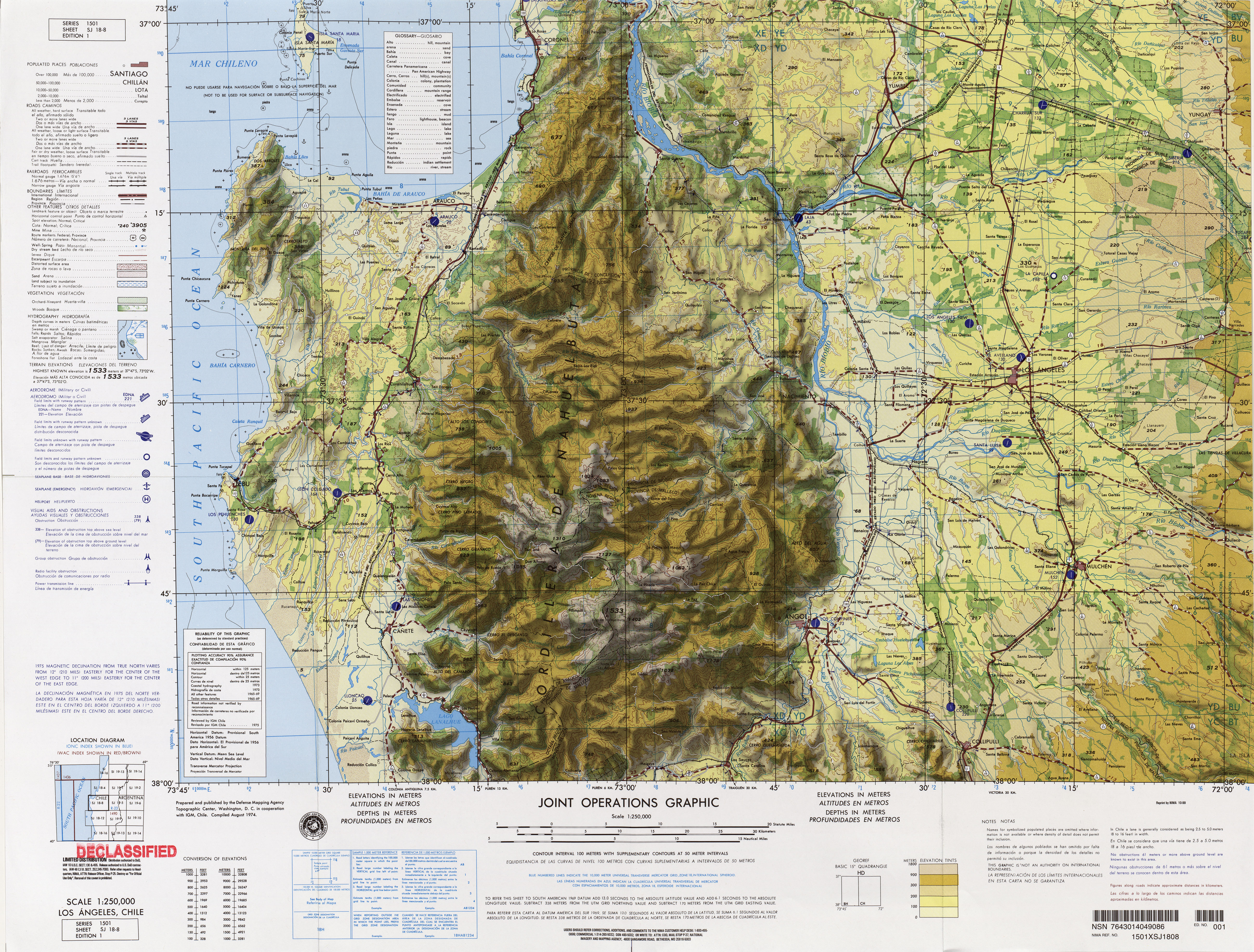
- Flag Coat of arms Location of the Yumbel commune in the Bío Bío Region Location in Chile
- Coordinates (City): 37°8′S 72°32′W
- Country: Chile
- Region: Bío Bío
- Province: Bío Bío

Government
  - Type: City

Area
  - Total: 727.0 km^{2} (280.7 sq mi)
- Elevation: 87 m (285 ft)

Population (2012 Census)
  - Total: 20,034
  - Density: 27.56/km^{2} (71.37/sq mi)
  - Urban: 10,935
  - Rural: 9,563

Sex
  - Men: 10,442
  - Women: 10,056
- Time zone: UTC−4 (CLT)
  - Summer (DST): UTC−3 (CLST)
- Area code: 56 + 43
- Website: Municipality of Yumbel

Yumbel is a city and commune of the Province of Bío Bío in the region of the same name, Chile.

== History ==
Yumbel originated from the small fort of San Felipe de Austria, raised in 1585 by Governor Alonso de Sotomayor, on the cerro del Centinela (Hill of the Sentinel). This fort was destroyed by the Mapuche and replaced in 1603, by Governor Alonso de Ribera as fort Santa Lucia de Yumbel. Destroyed in 1621 it was rebuilt the same year. It remained in use until 1648 when it was abandoned and its garrison sent to the fort of Nacimiento, Chile. Governor Ángel de Peredo again constructed it in 1663 as fort Nuestra Señora de Almudena. When Francisco de Meneses Brito populated it three years later he renamed it San Carlos de Austria de Yumbel. During the term of Diego González Montero Justiniano a town that had evolved was given the name of Santa Lucia de Yumbel. Governor Antonio de Guill y Gonzaga gave it the recognition as a town in 1766. It grew little until the Chilean War of Independence when it was occupied by both sides at times and then was burned by the Spanish guerrilla Juan Manuel Picó and the end of 1820.

The town was reduced to ruins in the earthquake of February 20, 1835, and was reestablished to the north of the old location on August 29, 1836. It alternated for some time with the town of San Luis Gonzaga as the capital of the Department of Rere, until the decree of June 2, 1853 confirmed Yumbel as the capital. On March 19, 1871, Yumbel was made a city.

== Geography ==
The city lies a few kilometers northeast of the confluence of the Laja and Bío Bío rivers. The Biobío River marks boundary between two natural regions of Chile, the Zona Central to the north and the Zona Austral to the south.

== Demographics ==
According to the 2002 census of the National Statistics Institute, Yumbel spans an area of 727 km^{2} (281 sq mi) and has 20,498 inhabitants (10,442 men and 10,056 women). Of these, 10,935 (53.3%) lived in urban areas and 9,563 (46.7%) in rural areas. The population grew by 0.2% (38 persons) between the 1992 and 2002 censuses.

== Administration ==
As a commune, Yumbel is a third-level administrative division of Chile administered by a municipal council, headed by an alcalde who is directly elected every four years. The 2008-2012 alcalde is Camilo Cabezas Vega (PH).

Within the electoral divisions of Chile, Yumbel is represented in the Chamber of Deputies by Jorge Sabag (PDC) and Frank Sauerbaum (RN) as part of the 42nd electoral district, together with San Fabián, Ñiquén, San Carlos, San Nicolás, Ninhue, Quirihue, Cobquecura, Treguaco, Portezuelo, Coelemu, Ránquil, Quillón, Bulnes and Cabrero. The commune is represented in the Senate by Alejandro Navarro Brain (MAS) and Hosain Sabag Castillo (PDC) as part of the 12th senatorial constituency (Biobío-Cordillera).
