= Termas de Chillán =

Ski resort in Chillán, Chile

Coordinates: 36°54′S 71°31′W

Termas de Chillán is a town located 82 km east of the Chilean city of Chillán. It has a ski center and three hotels.

== Ski center ==
The ski resort is located 1,650 meters above sea level and has 11 lifts serving 28 marked trails, and a total of 35 km runs over 10,000 hectares of terrain. In the center is South America's longest ski run, Las Tres Marias, which has a total length of 13 km. Since 2010 the management of the municipal concession has been managed by Consorcio Nevados Ltda.

== Hot Springs ==
Termas de Chillán is also known for its hot springs, with average temperatures of 60 C. The waters of these spas are sulfated and contain iron, sulfur, manganese, magnesium and potassium, among other minerals. In addition they are moderately mineralized.

== See also ==
- List of ski areas and resorts in South America
