= Bulnes, Chile =

Bulnes
- City and Commune
- Location of the Bulnes commune in the Ñuble Region

- Location in Chile
- Coordinates: 36°44′33″S 72°17′54″W
- Country: Chile
- Region: Ñuble
- Province: Diguillín

Government
  - Type: Municipality
  - Alcalde: Rodrigo De La Puente Acuña (ILE)

Area
  - Total: 425.4 km^{2} (164.2 sq mi)
- Elevation: 78 m (256 ft)

Population (2012 Census)
  - Total: 20,763
  - Density: 48.81/km^{2} (126.4/sq mi)
- Time zone: UTC−4 (CLT)
  - Summer (DST): UTC−3 (CLST)
- Area code: 56 + 42
- Climate: Csb
- Website: Municipality of Bulnes

Bulnes is a Chilean city and commune in Diguillín Province, Ñuble Region.

== Demographics ==
According to the 2002 census of the National Statistics Institute, Bulnes spans an area of 425.4 km^{2} (164 sq mi) and has 20,595 inhabitants (10,275 men and 10,320 women). Of these, 12,514 (60.8%) lived in urban areas and 8,081 (39.2%) in rural areas. Between the 1992 and 2002 censuses, the population grew by 4.5% (882 persons).

== Administration ==
As a commune, Bulnes is a third-level administrative division of Chile administered by a municipal council, headed by an alcalde who is directly elected every four years. The 2008-2012 alcalde is Rodrigo De La Puente Acuña (ILE). The municipal council has the following members:

- Ricardo Rodriguez Penrros (RN)
- Alejandro Valle Elgueta (ILC)
- Juan Arévalo Rojas (RN)
- Max Pacheco Palma (UDI)
- Oscar Troncoso Stuardo (PS)
- Mario Urra Riquelme (PDC)

Within the electoral divisions of Chile, Bulnes is represented in the Chamber of Deputies by Jorge Sabag (PDC) and Frank Sauerbaum (RN) as part of the 42nd electoral district, together with San Fabián, Ñiquén, San Carlos, San Nicolás, Ninhue, Quirihue, Cobquecura, Treguaco, Portezuelo, Coelemu, Ránquil, Quillón, Cabrero and Yumbel. The commune is represented in the Senate by Alejandro Navarro Brain (MAS) and Hosain Sabag Castillo (PDC) as part of the 12th senatorial constituency (Biobío-Cordillera).
