= Itata River =

River in Chile

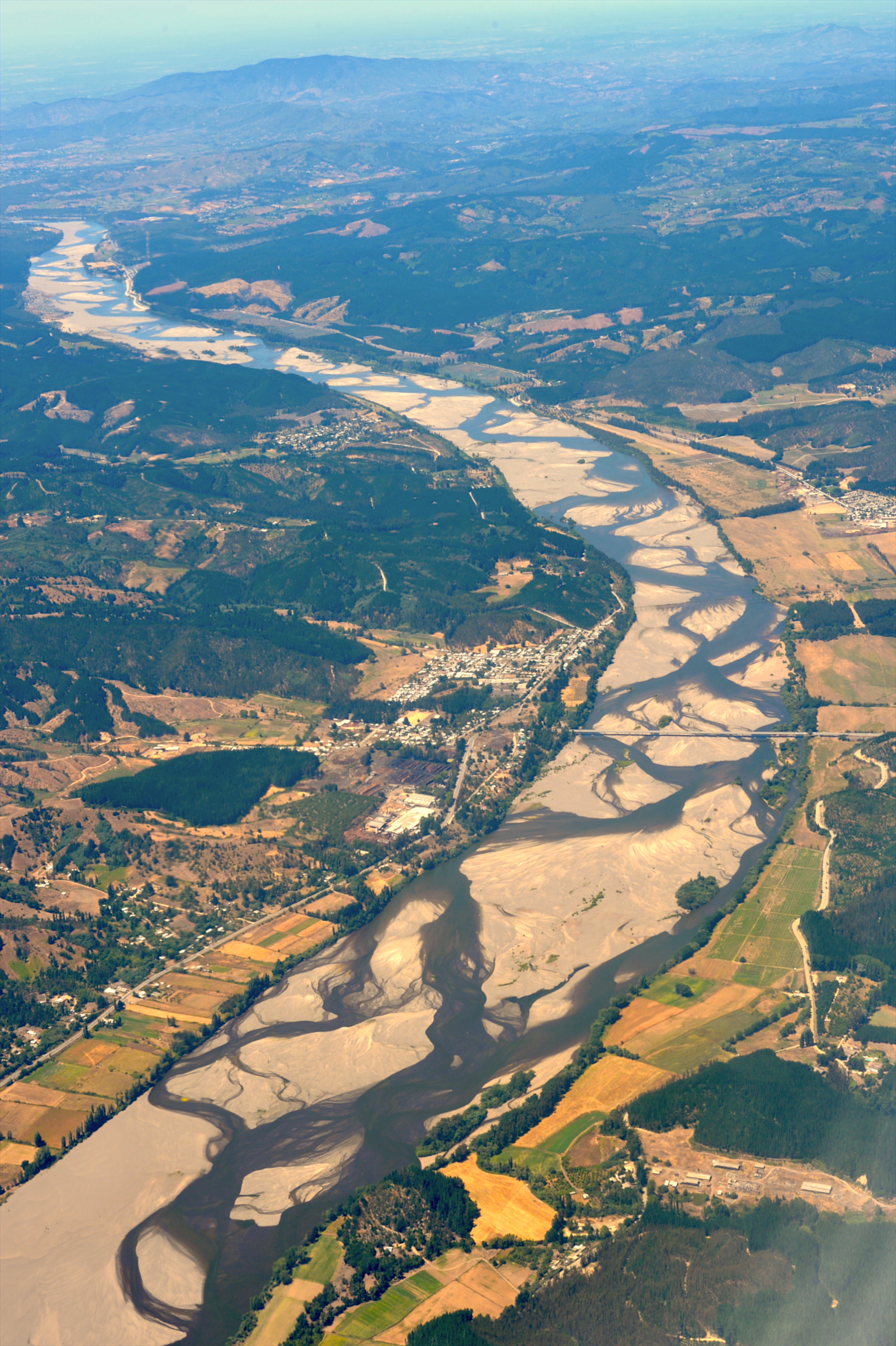
- View of Itata River near Coelemu

Location
- Country: Chile

Physical characteristics
- Mouth: Pacific Ocean
  - coordinates: 36°23′12″S 72°52′06″W
- Length: Approximately 140 km (87 mi)
- Basin size: 11,294 km^{2} (4,361 sq mi)
- Discharge
  - average: 6–700 cubic metres per second (210–24,720 cu ft/s)

The Itata River flows in the Ñuble Region, southern Chile.

Until the Conquest of Chile, the Itata was the natural limit between the Mapuche, located to the south, and Picunche, to the north. The Itata River flows westward and reaches the Pacific Ocean approximately 60 kilometers north of Conception.

== See also ==
- Itata
- List of rivers in Chile
