= Ninhue =

- Town and Commune
- Coat of arms

- Commune of Ninhue in the Ñuble Region

- Location in Chile
- Coordinates: 36°23′37″S 72°23′51″W
- Country: Chile
- Region: Ñuble
- Province: Itata

Government
  - Type: Municipality
  - Alcalde: Carmen Blanco Hadi (National Renovation, RN)

Area
  - Total: 401.2 km^{2} (154.9 sq mi)
- Elevation: 86 m (282 ft)

Population (2012 Census)
  - Total: 5,268
  - Density: 13.13/km^{2} (34.01/sq mi)
  - Urban: 1,433
  - Rural: 4,305

Sex
  - Men: 2,920
  - Women: 2,818
- Time zone: UTC-4 (CLT)
  - Summer (DST): UTC-3 (CLST)
- Area code: country 56 + city 42
- Website: Comuna de Ninhue

Ninhue (Spanish pronunciation: [ˈnin.we]) is a commune and town in the Itata Province, Ñuble Region, Chile.

== Demographics ==
According to the 2002 census of the National Statistics Institute, Ninhue spans an area of 401.2 km^{2} (155 sq mi) and has 5,738 inhabitants (2,920 men and 2,818 women). Of these, 1,433 (25%) lived in urban areas and 4,305 (75%) in rural areas. The population fell by 10.6% (679 persons) between the 1992 and 2002 censuses.

== Administration ==
As a commune, Ninhue is a third-level administrative division of Chile administered by a municipal council, headed by an alcalde who is directly elected every four years. The 2008-2012 alcalde is Luis Molina Melo (PDC).

Within the electoral divisions of Chile, Ninhue is represented in the Chamber of Deputies by Jorge Sabag (PDC) and Frank Sauerbaum (RN) as part of the 42nd electoral district, together with San Fabián, Ñiquén, San Carlos, San Nicolás, Quirihue, Cobquecura, Treguaco, Portezuelo, Coelemu, Ránquil, Quillón, Bulnes, Cabrero and Yumbel. The commune is represented in the Senate by Alejandro Navarro Brain (MAS) and Hosain Sabag Castillo (PDC) as part of the 12th senatorial constituency (Biobío-Cordillera).
