= Quillón =

- City and Commune
- Map of Quillón commune in the Ñuble Region

- Location in Chile
- Coordinates: 36°44′40″S 72°28′36″W
- Country: Chile
- Region: Ñuble
- Province: Diguillín

Government
  - Type: Municipality
  - Alcalde: Alberto Gyhra Soto (DC)

Area
  - Total: 423.0 km^{2} (163.3 sq mi)
- Elevation: 57 m (187 ft)

Population (2012 Census)
  - Total: 16,233
  - Density: 38.38/km^{2} (99.39/sq mi)
  - Urban: 7,536
  - Rural: 7,610

Sex
  - Men: 7,699
  - Women: 7,447
- Time zone: UTC−4 (CLT)
  - Summer (DST): UTC−3 (CLST)
- Postal code: 3940000
- Area code: 56 + 42
- Website: quillon.cl

Quillón is a Chilean city and commune and Diguillín Province, Ñuble Region.

== Demographics ==
According to the 2002 census of the National Statistics Institute, Quillón spans an area of 423 km^{2} (163 sq mi) and has 15,146 inhabitants (7,699 men and 7,447 women). Of these, 7,536 (49.8%) lived in urban areas and 7,610 (50.2%) in rural areas. The population grew by 4% (584 persons) between the 1992 and 2002 censuses.

== Administration ==
As a commune, Quillón is a third-level administrative division of Chile administered by a municipal council, headed by an alcalde who is directly elected every four years. The 2008–2012 alcalde is Jaime Catalán Saldias (PDC).

Within the electoral divisions of Chile, Quillón is represented in the Chamber of Deputies by Jorge Sabag (PDC) and Frank Sauerbaum (RN) as part of the 42nd electoral district, (together with San Fabián, Ñiquén, San Carlos, San Nicolás, Ninhue, Quirihue, Cobquecura, Treguaco, Portezuelo, Coelemu, Ránquil, Bulnes, Cabrero and Yumbel). The commune is represented in the Senate by Alejandro Navarro Brain (MAS) and Hosain Sabag Castillo (PDC) as part of the 12th senatorial constituency (Biobío-Cordillera).

== Temperature record ==
On January 26, 2017, while the central zone was affected by large forest fires, in Quillón the highest temperature in the country's history was recorded at 44.9 °C (112.8 °F), although this is disputed as it is thought that the forest fires influenced the thermometer reading.
