= Coelemu =

- City and Commune
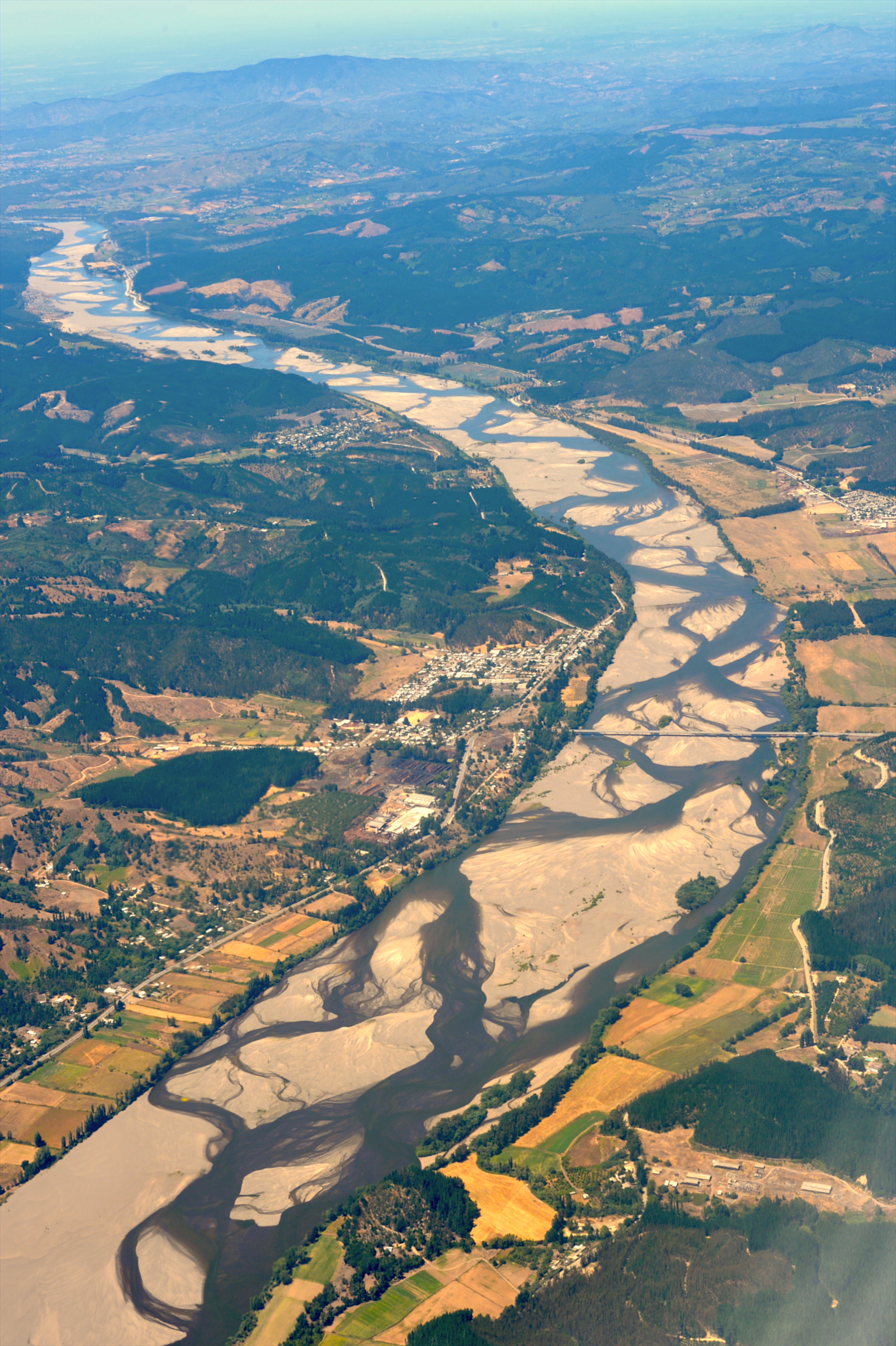
- View of Itata River near Coelemu

- Coat of arms

- Map of the Coelemu commune in the Ñuble Region

- Location in Chile
- Coordinates (city): 36°29′16″S 72°42′10″W
- Country: Chile
- Region: Ñuble
- Province: Itata

Government
  - Type: Municipality
  - Alcalde: Laura Aravena Alarcón (ILE)

Area
  - Total: 342.3 km^{2} (132.2 sq mi)
- Elevation: 33 m (108 ft)

Population (2012 Census)
  - Total: 15,711
  - Density: 45.90/km^{2} (118.9/sq mi)
  - Urban: 9,845
  - Rural: 6,237

Sex
  - Men: 8,086
  - Women: 7,996
- Time zone: UTC−4 (CLT)
  - Summer (DST): UTC−3 (CLST)
- Area code: 56 + 42
- Climate: Csb
- Website: Municipality of Coelemu

Coelemu is a Chilean commune and city in Itata Province, Ñuble Region. According to the 2002 census, the commune population was 16,082 and has an area of 342.3 km^{2} (132 sq mi).

== Demographics ==
According to the 2002 census of the National Statistics Institute, Coelemu spans an area of 342.3 km^{2} (132 sq mi) and has 16,082 inhabitants (7,996 women and 8,086 men). Of these, 9,845 (61.2%) lived in urban areas and 6,237 (38.8%) in rural areas. Between the 1992 and 2002 censuses, the population grew by 867% (14,419 persons).

Besides the city of Coelemu, within the commune of Coelemu are the following towns and localities (all of less than 1,000 inhabitants):

- Vegas de Itata
- Guarilihue
- Caleta Burea
- Cuadrapangue
- Conai
- Magdalena
- El Pellín
- Ranquelmo
- Perales
- Dinamapu
- Meipo

== Administration ==
As a commune, Coelemu is a third-level administrative division of Chile administered by a municipal council, headed by an alcalde who is directly elected every four years. The 2008-2012 alcalde is Laura Aravena Alarcón (ILE).

Within the electoral divisions of Chile, Coelemu is represented in the Chamber of Deputies by Jorge Sabag (PDC) and Frank Sauerbaum (RN) as part of the 42nd electoral district, together with San Fabián, Ñiquén, San Carlos, San Nicolás, Ninhue, Quirihue, Cobquecura, Treguaco, Portezuelo, Ránquil, Quillón, Bulnes, Cabrero and Yumbel. The commune is represented in the Senate by Alejandro Navarro Brain (MAS) and Hosain Sabag Castillo (PDC) as part of the 12th senatorial constituency (Biobío-Cordillera).
