= San Carlos, Chile =

San Carlos
- City and Commune
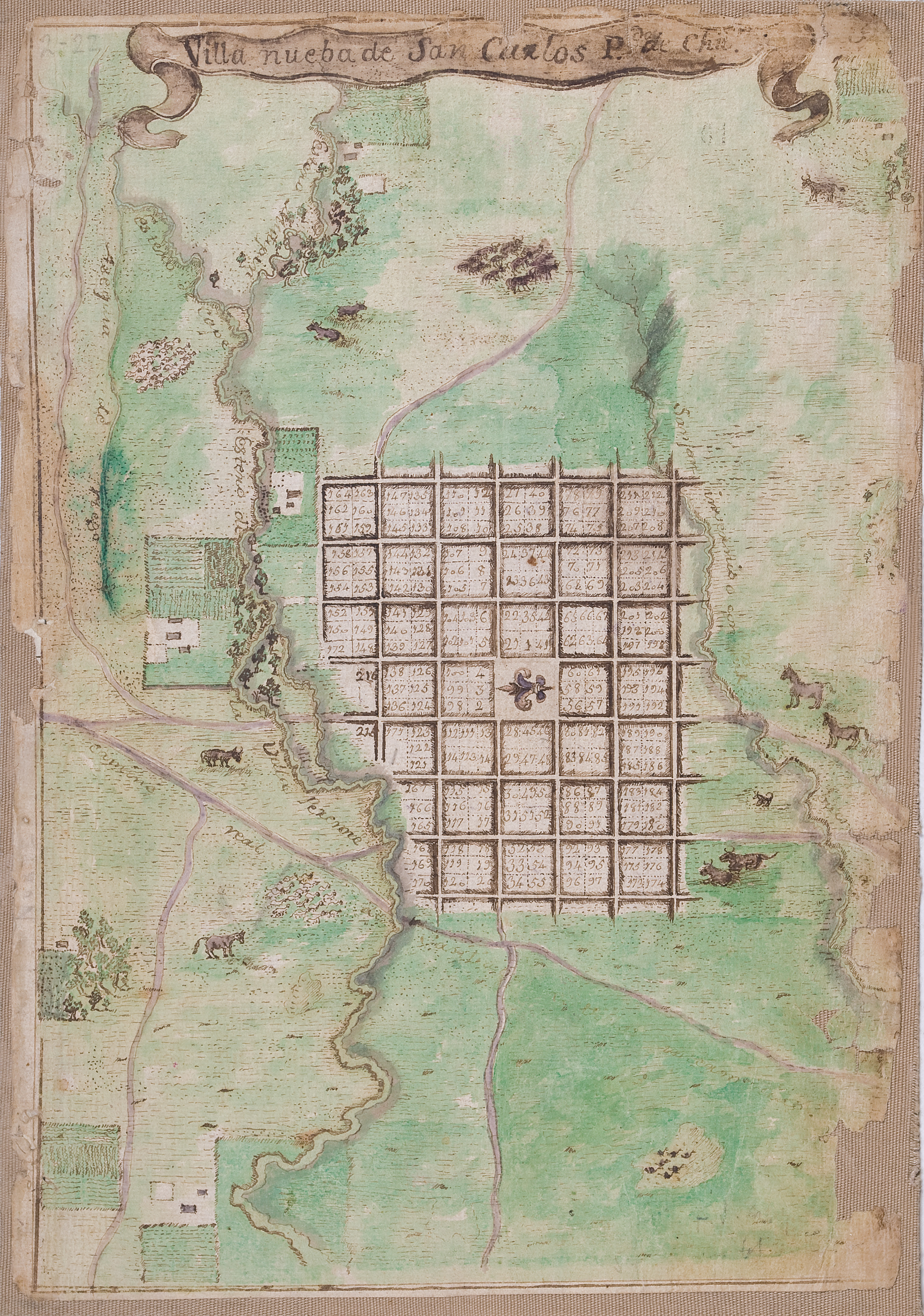
- Map of the foundation of San Carlos in 1805

- Coat of arms Location of San carlos commune in Ñuble Region Location in Chile
- Coordinates: 36°25′29″S 71°57′29″W
- Country: Chile
- Region: Ñuble
- Province: Punilla
- Founded: July 3, 1800
- Founded as: San Carlos de Itihue

Government
  - Type: Municipality
  - Alcalde: Hugo Naim Gebrie Asfura (RN)

Area
  - Total: 874.0 km^{2} (337.5 sq mi)
- Elevation: 161 m (528 ft)

Population (2012 Census)
  - Total: 51,035
  - Density: 58.39/km^{2} (151.2/sq mi)
- Demonym: Sancarlino

Sex
- Time zone: UTC−4 (CLT)
  - Summer (DST): UTC−3 (CLST)
- Postal code: 3840000
- Area code: 56 + 42
- Website: Official website (in Spanish)

San Carlos is the name of a city and commune (Spanish: comuna) of Punilla Province in the Ñuble Region of Chile.

== Geography and agriculture ==
San Carlos is a bustling market town located roughly in the center of Chile's agricultural heartland about 365 km (227 mi) south of Santiago, 133 km (83 mi) northeast of Concepción, the regional capital and 32 km (20 mi) north of Chillán, the provincial capital. It sits on an alluvial plain between nearby Chillán and the Perquilauquén river. The commune covers an area of 874 km^{2} (337 sq mi). Its territory lies almost entirely within the fertile, central plain or "depresión intermedia", (Chilean Central Valley). Its countryside is reputed for its bountiful production of various crops as well as orchards (apple, grapes, berries, and more recently, kiwi).

San Carlos is bordered on the west by the commune of Ninhue, on the north by Ñiquén and Cauquenes (the latter in Cauquenes Province), on the east by San Fabián, and on the south by San Nicolás, Chillán and Coihueco.

=== Geographic Coordinates ===
- Altitude: 151 m (495 ft)
- Latitude: 36° 25' 60S
- Longitude: 72° 2' 60W

=== Climate ===
San Carlos has a mild Mediterranean climate. The summers are hot and mainly dry (November to March) with temperatures reaching up to 34 °C (93 °F) on the months of December, January and February.

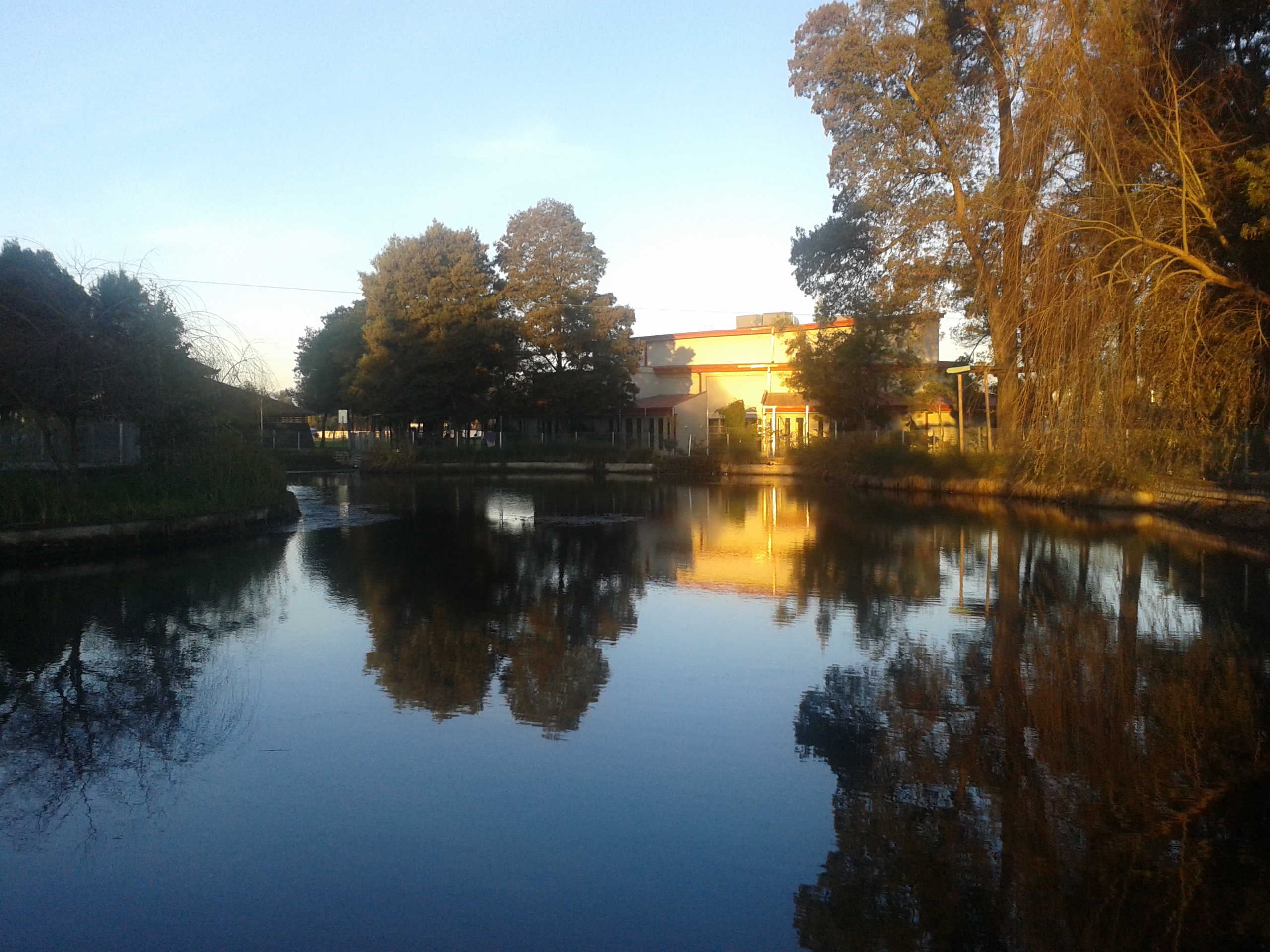
Laguna Parque Quirel in winter

Season	Fall	Winter	Spring	Summer
Average rainfall, in mm (%)	349 (26%)	708 (53%)	220 (16%)	69 (5%)

== Demography ==
Today, San Carlos is the second most populous city of Ñuble Region. According to the 2002 census the population of the city was 29,359 (14,035 male, 15,324 female) while that of the commune of San Carlos was 50,088 (24,910 male, 25,178 female). Roughly, 62% of the population is urban and 38% is rural. According to recent estimations by SUBDERE, the commune has a population of 51,119 in 2006. Between the 1992 census and that of 2002, the population of San Carlos grew at a 4.1% rate (.41% annual rate).

Census (year)	Total population	Urban population (%)	Rural population (%)
1970	37,819	17,433 (46.1%)	20,386 (53.9%)
1982	43,736	26,449 (60.5%)	17,287 (39.5%)
1992	48,129	26,048 (54.1%)	22,081 (45.9%)
2002	50,088	31,018 (62.0%)	19,070 (38.0%)

The commune encompasses a large number of villages, hamlets and other rural entities. Its second most populous locality, after San Carlos, is Cachapoal, with 1,164 residents in 2002 (578 male, 586 female). This village has been considered as "urban" in the 2002 census by the National Statistics Institute.

== History ==
The city was founded by a Spaniard, don José Joaquín del Pino de Rozas y Negrete on July 3, 1800.

On May 15, 1813, San Carlos was the setting for one of the most important battles of the Chilean War of Independence, the Battle of San Carlos, where the patriot army, led by general José Miguel Carrera defeated the royalist army. The outcome of the battle set the ground for the patriot uprising in the whole region.

== Society ==
The city of San Carlos is also the birth city of various artists, painters, authors, and singers. The painter Hernán Gazmuri was born here. The group of singers called Los Angeles Negros (The Black Angels) was also formed here. Although the township of San Fabián argues the birth place of Violeta Parra, she is included amongst Gazmuri and Los Angeles Negros as a folklorist, author, investigator, and singer born in San Carlos. The house in which the artist was supposedly born is located on the street El Roble # 535-531. This place was declared a National Monument in accordance with the Decree Law Number 668 on September 29, 1992.

Currently the city is working on a new initiative to create the "Casa Museo de Violeta Parra" (House Museum of Violeta Parra). This is a project based on the San Carlos Government’s idea that not only will the Fundación Violeta Parra de Santiago (Foundation Violeta Parra of Santiago) participate, but also specific contacts of the Parra family that have already visited the site in numerous occasions.

Among the city’s attractions lies the Medialuna of San Carlos which is a sports arena where the Chilean rodeo is practiced. The arena has a capacity of 8,000 people; second in size only to the Medialuna of Rancagua. It is fitting to also note that the Chilean rodeo is a very popular sport in this zone.

=== Education ===
Currently, the commune has around 60 primary education establishments, 10 of them located in the city and the rest in rural areas, as well as 7 secondary education establishments, 6 of them in the city.

The commune has a public library, established on October 17, 1983, named after Eusebio Lillo, as well as a branch located in the 11 de Septiembre neighborhood, which was created in 1997 through a project funded by the National Fund for Culture and Arts (FONDART), both in the communal capital.

The secondary education establishments are:

- Capitán Ignacio Carrera Pinto Polytechnic High School, public (the first to operate since 1945)
- José Miguel Carrera Verdugo School, E-112, public
- Violeta Parra Sandoval Technical Professional High School, public
- Diego Portales Palazuelos High School, public (since 2012)
- Agricultural High School, public (located on the outskirts of the city)
- El Árbol de la Vida School, subsidized private
- Nuestra Señora de la Merced High School, subsidized private
- Santa María Institute, subsidized private
- Sagrado Corazón School, subsidized private
- Concepción School, subsidized private
- Dinabec College, subsidized private
- San José School, subsidized private

=== Religion ===
According to the 2002 census, 25,141 residents of San Carlos commune aged 15 years or older identified themselves as Catholics, equivalent to 68.51% of the total population, while 22.01% described themselves as Evangelical protestants, 0.59% as Jehovah's Witnesses and 1.35% as Latter-day Saints. About 5.03% of the population identified themselves to be atheist or agnostic, while 3.19% declared to follow other religions.

== Notable residents ==
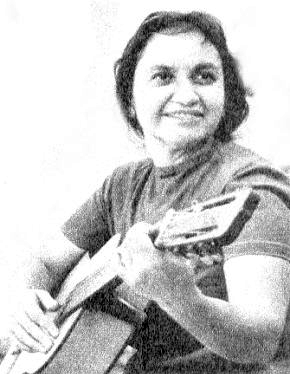
Violeta Parra

In 1850, General Sofanor Parra was born in this city, who was a renowned Chilean officer of the cavalry branch of the Chilean Army that stood out in the War of the Pacific.

San Carlos is the birthplace of one of the most widely recognized names in Chilean and Latin American folk music, Violeta Parra. She has long been acclaimed as a great folk artist, author, painter, researcher and singer. The house where this artist was born is located in the city of San Carlos. It was declared National Monument by Law Decree 668 on September 29, 1992. San Carlos is also the birthplace of other well-known artists. Among them there are painters such as Hernán Gazmuri and a popular band from the 1970s, Los Ángeles Negros.

== Administration ==
As a commune, San Carlos is a third-level administrative division of Chile administered by a municipal council, headed by an alcalde who is directly elected every four years.

Within the electoral divisions of Chile, San Carlos is represented in the Chamber of Deputies by Jorge Sabag (PDC) and Frank Sauerbaum (RN) as part of the 42nd electoral district, together with San Fabián, Ñiquén, San Nicolás, Ninhue, Quirihue, Cobquecura, Treguaco, Portezuelo, Coelemu, Ránquil, Quillón, Bulnes, Cabrero and Yumbel. The commune is represented in the Senate by Alejandro Navarro Brain (MAS) and Hosain Sabag Castillo (PDC) as part of the 12th senatorial constituency (Biobío-Cordillera).

== Twin cities ==
San Carlos is twinned with the Spanish city of Baena located in Andalucia, southern Spain, in the province of Córdoba. San Carlos' founder, José Joaquín del Pino de Rozas y Negrete, was born in Baena.
