= Ñiquén =

- Commune
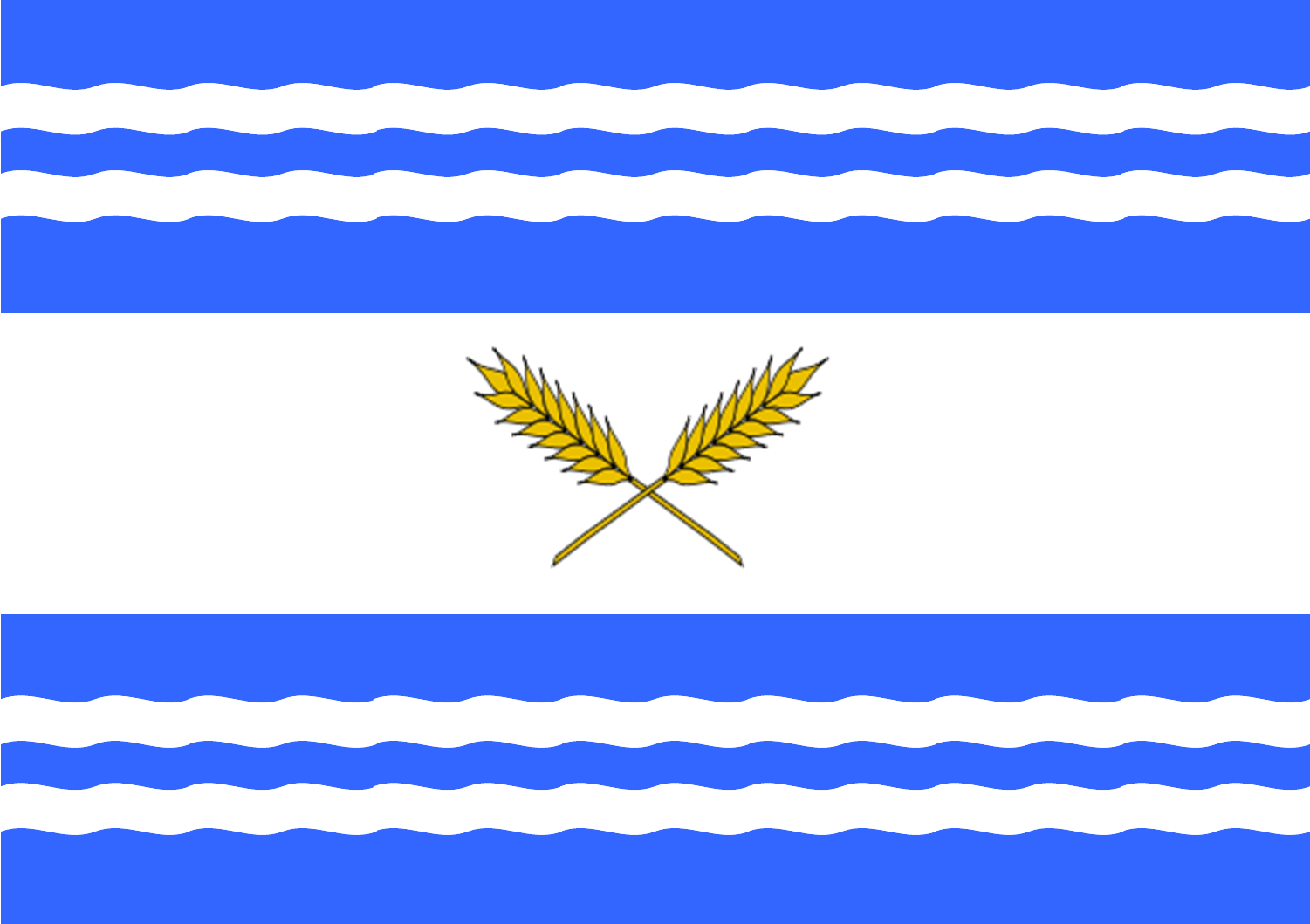
- Flag Coat of arms

- Map of the Ñiquén commune in the Ñuble Region

- Location in Chile
- Coordinates (commune): 36°18′S 71°54′W
- Country: Chile
- Region: Ñuble
- Province: Punilla
- Founded: 22 December 1891
- Founded as: San Gregorio

Government
  - Type: Municipality
  - Alcalde: Domingo Garrido Torres (PPD)

Area
  - Total: 493.1 km^{2} (190.4 sq mi)
- Elevation: 149 m (489 ft)

Population (2012 Census)
  - Total: 10,759
  - Density: 21.82/km^{2} (56.51/sq mi)
  - Urban: 1,143
  - Rural: 10,278

Sex
  - Men: 5,886
  - Women: 5,535
- Time zone: UTC-4 (CLT)
  - Summer (DST): UTC-3 (CLST)
- Area code: 56 + 42
- Website: Municipality of Ñiquén

Ñiquén is a commune of the Punilla Province, located in the north of the Ñuble Region of Chile. Geographically, it is delimited by the Perquilauquén River to the north and the Ñiquén River in the south. Its boundary to the north is the commune of Parral and to the west that of Cauquenes both in the Maule Region, to the south with the commune of San Carlos, and to the east with San Fabian de Alico. The town of San Gregorio is the capital of this commune.

== Demographics ==
According to the 2002 census of the National Statistics Institute, Ñiquén spans an area of 493.1 km^{2} (190 sq mi) and has 11,421 inhabitants (5,886 men and 5,535 women). Of these, 1,143 (10%) lived in urban areas and 10,278 (90%) in rural areas. The population fell by 13.2% (1735 persons) between the 1992 and 2002 censuses.

== Administration ==
As a commune, Ñiquén is a third-level administrative division of Chile administered by a municipal council, headed by an alcalde who is directly elected every four years. The 2008-2012 alcalde is Domingo Garrido Torres (PPD).

Within the electoral divisions of Chile, Ñiquén is represented in the Chamber of Deputies by Jorge Sabag (PDC) and Frank Sauerbaum (RN) as part of the 42nd electoral district, together with San Fabián, San Carlos, San Nicolás, Ninhue, Quirihue, Cobquecura, Treguaco, Portezuelo, Coelemu, Ránquil, Quillón, Bulnes, Cabrero and Yumbel. The commune is represented in the Senate by Alejandro Navarro Brain (MAS) and Hosain Sabag Castillo (PDC) as part of the 12th senatorial constituency (Biobío-Cordillera).
