= Ránquil =

- Commune
- Commune of Ránquil in the Ñuble Region

- Location in Chile
- Coordinates: 36°36′12″S 72°32′35″W
- Country: Chile
- Region: Ñuble
- Province: Itata

Government
  - Type: Municipality
  - Alcalde: Carlos Garrido Carcamo (UDI)

Area
  - Total: 248.3 km^{2} (95.9 sq mi)
- Elevation: 41 m (135 ft)

Population (2012 Census)
  - Total: 5,762
  - Density: 23.21/km^{2} (60.10/sq mi)
  - Urban: 1,337
  - Rural: 4,346

Sex
  - Men: 2,896
  - Women: 2,787
- Time zone: UTC-4 (CLT)
  - Summer (DST): UTC-3 (CLST)
- Area code: 56 + 42
- Website: Municipality of Ránquil

Ránquil is a Chilean commune in Itata Province, Ñuble Region. The communal capital is the town of Ránquil.

== Demographics ==
According to the 2002 census of the National Statistics Institute Ránquil had 5,683 inhabitants (2,896 men and 2,787 women). Of these, 1,337 (23.5%) lived in urban areas and 4,346 (76.5%) in rural areas. The population fell by 11.3% (721 persons) between the 1992 and 2002 censuses.

== Administration ==
As a commune, Ránquil is a third-level administrative division of Chile administered by a municipal council, headed by an alcalde who is directly elected every four years. The 2008-2012 alcalde is Carlos Garrido Carcamo (UDI).

Within the electoral divisions of Chile, Ránquil is represented in the Chamber of Deputies by Jorge Sabag (PDC) and Frank Sauerbaum (RN) as part of the 42nd electoral district, together with San Fabián, Ñiquén, San Carlos, San Nicolás, Ninhue, Quirihue, Cobquecura, Treguaco, Portezuelo, Coelemu, Quillón, Bulnes, Cabrero and Yumbel. The commune is represented in the Senate by Alejandro Navarro Brain (MAS) and Hosain Sabag Castillo (PDC) as part of the 12th senatorial constituency (Biobío-Cordillera).
