= Cobquecura =

- Town and Commune
- Coat of arms

- Location of the Cobquecura commune in the Ñuble Region

- Location in Chile
- Coordinates: 36°08′S 72°47′W
- Country: Chile
- Region: Ñuble
- Province: Itata

Government
  - Type: Municipality
  - Alcalde: Julio Manuel Fuentes Alarcón (PRSD)

Area
  - Total: 570.3 km^{2} (220.2 sq mi)
- Elevation: 124 m (407 ft)

Population (2012 Census)
  - Total: 5,043
  - Density: 8.843/km^{2} (22.90/sq mi)
  - Urban: 1,493
  - Rural: 4,193

Sex
  - Men: 3,032
  - Women: 2,655
- Time zone: UTC-4 (CLT)
  - Summer (DST): UTC-3 (CLST)
- Area code: country 56 + city 42
- Climate: Csb
- Website: Municipality of Cobquecura

Cobquecura is a commune in the Region of Ñuble (Spanish: comuna) in the Province of Itata Chile's Region of Ñuble. The town is located on the northwest Pacific coast of the Itata Province about 420 km (261 mi) southwest of the national capital of Santiago.

The commune is since the 2020s the site of a project to mine rare-earth elements by NeoRe of Chilean Cobalt (Cobalt Corp).

== Demographics ==
According to the 2002 census of the National Statistics Institute, Cobquecura spans an area of 570.3 km^{2} (220 sq mi) and has 5,687 inhabitants (3,032 men and 2,655 women). Of these, 1,493 (26.3%) lived in urban areas and 4,194 (73.7%) in rural areas. Between the 1992 and 2002 censuses, the population fell by 9.1% (570 persons).

== Administration ==
As a commune, Cobquecura is a third-level administrative division of Chile administered by a municipal council, headed by an alcalde who is directly elected every four years. The 2008-2012 alcalde is Julio Manuel Fuentes Alarcón (PRSD).The municipal council has the following members:

- Luis Enrique Rodríguez Alarcón (PS)
- Lautaro Igor Millanao Mora (PDC)
- Guillermo Salgado Contreras (ILF)
- Jacqueline Elizabeth Pacheco Alacón (RN)
- Temistocle Vera Irribarra (PRSD)
- Jose Pedro Cifuentes Crisostomo (RN)

Within the electoral divisions of Chile, Cobquecura is represented in the Chamber of Deputies by Jorge Sabag (PDC) and Frank Sauerbaum (RN) as part of the 42nd electoral district, together with San Fabián, Ñiquén, San Carlos, San Nicolás, Ninhue, Quirihue, Treguaco, Portezuelo, Coelemu, Ránquil, Quillón, Bulnes, Cabrero and Yumbel. The commune is represented in the Senate by Alejandro Navarro Brain (MAS) and Hosain Sabag Castillo (PDC) as part of the 12th senatorial constituency (Biobío-Cordillera).

== Notable residents ==
Cobquecura is the birthplace of many significant Chilean figures, including:

- Mariano Latorre (1886-1955) Writer of Basque descent. He won the Chilean National Prize for Literature in 1944.
- Fidel Sepulveda Llanos (1936-2006) Poet, Researcher, Spanish and literary aesthetics Professor, PhD in Hispanic Philology for the Complutense University of Madrid and Member of the Chilean Academy of Language
