= Treguaco =

Treguaco Trehuaco
- City
- Coat of arms

- Commune of Treguaco in the Ñuble Region

- Location in Chile
- Coordinates: 36°25′51″S 72°40′05″W
- Country: Chile
- Region: Ñuble
- Province: Itata
- Founded: 30 January 1973

Government
  - Type: Municipality
  - Alcalde: Luis Cuevas Iarra (Ind.)

Area
  - Total: 313.1 km^{2} (120.9 sq mi)
- Elevation: 16 m (52 ft)

Population (2012 Census)
  - Total: 5,227
  - Density: 16.69/km^{2} (43.24/sq mi)
  - Urban: 1,245
  - Rural: 4,051
- Demonym: Trehuaquino

Sex
  - Men: 2788
  - Women: 2508
- Time zone: UTC-4 (CLT)
  - Summer (DST): UTC-3 (CLST)
- Area code: 56 + 42
- Website: Municipality of Treguaco

Treguaco (Spanish pronunciation: [tɾeˈɣwako]), also spelled as Trehuaco ([tɾeˈwako]), is a Chilean city and commune in Itata Province, Ñuble Region. The commune spans an area of 313.1 km^{2} (121 sq mi).

== Demographics ==
According to data from the 2002 Census of Population and Housing, the Treguaco commune had 5,296 inhabitants; of these, 1,245 (23.5%) lived in urban areas and 4,051 (76.5%) in rural areas. At that time, there were 2,788 men and 2,508 women residing in the commune. The commune's population fell by 6% (341 persons) between the censuses of 1992 and 2002 (0.6% annual loss). Trehuaquino is the demonym for a man from Treguaco, and Trehuaquina is a woman from Treguaco.

== Administration ==
As a commune, Treguaco is a third-level administrative division of Chile administered by a municipal council, headed by an alcalde who is directly elected every four years. For the years 2008-2012, the alcalde is Luis Cuevas Iarra (Ind.), and the council members are:

- Juan Cabrera Monsalve (PH)
- Olga Osses Klein (UDI)
- Gabriel Figueroa Retamal (PDC)
- Jaime Torres Barra (PDC)
- Juan Carlos Sepúlveda Pedreros (PPD)
- Tamara Valenzuela Fuentealba (PS)

Within the electoral divisions of Chile, Treguaco is represented in the Chamber of Deputies as a part of the 42nd electoral district (together with San Fabián, Ñiquén, San Carlos, San Nicolás, Ninhue, Quirihue, Cobquecura, Portezuelo, Coelemu, Ránquil, Quillón, Bulnes, Cabrero and Yumbel). The commune is represented in the Senate as part of the 13th senatorial constituency (Biobío Cordillera).
