= San Fabián =

- Commune
- Coat of arms

- Location in the Ñuble Region

- Location in Chile
- Coordinates: 36°33′S 71°33′W
- Country: Chile
- Region: Ñuble
- Province: Punilla
- Founded: 7 December 1865
- Capital: San Fabián de Alico

Government
  - Type: Municipality
  - Alcalde: Cristofer Valdés (Ind.)

Area
  - Total: 1,568.3 km^{2} (605.5 sq mi)
- Elevation: 477 m (1,565 ft)

Population (2017 Census)
  - Total: 4,308
  - Density: 2.747/km^{2} (7.114/sq mi)
- Demonym: Sanfabianino
- Time zone: UTC-4 (CLT)
  - Summer (DST): UTC-3 (CLST)
- Area code: 56 + 42
- Website: Municipality of San Fabián

San Fabián is the easternmost of 21 communes in the Punilla Province of central Chile's. Ñuble Region. The capital is the town of San Fabián de Alico. The commune spans an area of 1,568.3 km^{2} (606 sq mi).

== Administration ==
As a commune, San Fabián is administered by a municipal council, headed by a directly elected alcalde. For 2024-2028 term, the alcalde is Cristofer Valdés González (Ind.), and the council members are:

- Evelyn Troncoso Sepúlveda (UDI)
- Maximiliano Quiñones Ceballos (PPD)
- Jaime Meriño Constanzo (DC)
- Samuel Muñoz Muñoz (Ind./PR)
- Carlos Orellana Orellana (PPD)
- César Palavecino Morales (Ind./RN)

Within the electoral divisions of Chile, San Fabián is represented in the Chamber of Deputies by Marta Bravo Salinas (UDI), Frank Sauerbaum Muñoz (RN), Cristóbal Martínez Ramírez (UDI), Sara Concha Smith (PSC), and Felipe Camaño Cárdenas (DC) for the 2022–2026 term, as a part of the 19th electoral district (together with Bulnes, Cobquecura, Coelemu, Ñiquén, Portezuelo, Quillón, Quirihue, Ninhue, Ránquil, San Carlos, San Nicolás, Treguaco, Chillán, Chillán Viejo, Coihueco, El Carmen, Pemuco, Pinto, San Ignacio, and Yungay). The commune is represented in the Senate by Loreto Carvajal Ambiado (PPD) and Gustavo Sanhueza Dueñas (UDI) for the 2022–2030 term, as part of the 16th senatorial constituency (Ñuble Region).

== Demographics ==
According to data from the 2017 Census of Population and Housing, the San Fabián commune had 4,308 inhabitants. The population density of San Fabian is 2,7/km2

=== Cities ===
Cities with their respective inhabitants according to the 2002 census.

San Fabian, Capital of the commune, 1452 inhabitants

Paso Ancho, 302 inhabitants

La Vega, 176 inhabitants

Los Puquios, 102 inhabitants

La Montaña, 94 inhabitants

La Punilla, 81 inhabitants

Trabuncura, 80 inhabitants

El Macal, 55 inhabitants

Bullielo, 47 inhabitants

El Palo, 37 inhabitants

Las Guardias, 12 inhabitants

==== Socioeconomic inequality ====
According to the data from the Casen 2006 survey has the highest Gina coefficient in Chile, 0.607, followed by the commune of San Pedro de la Paz, in the Bibío Region, with an index of 0,54 . This index measures the inequality in the existing income level, with 0 being the minimum and 1being the maximum.
