= MAS Region =

MAS Region MAS Región
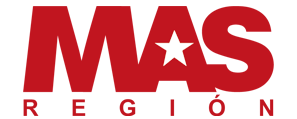
- President: Cristián Tapia Ramos
- Founded: 2008
- Dissolved: 2018
- Coalition: Nueva Mayoría
- Membership (2009): 23,619 (10th)
- Ideology: Democratic socialism Regionalism
- Political position: Left-wing
- Colours: Red and White
- Chamber of Deputies: 0 / 120
- Senate: 0 / 38

The MAS Region (Spanish: MAS Región), known until 2014 as Broad Social Movement (Spanish: Movimiento Amplio Social, MAS) was a Chilean left-wing political party founded by Alejandro Navarro in 2008.

The party was created as a political movement in 2008, by Senator Alejandro Navarro, after the then member of the Socialist Party (PS) began to feel poorly represented both by his party (which was then headed by Camilo Escalona) as the Concertacion, political coalition that owns the PS. The party is inspired by the Socialism of the 21st century.

In 2009, after a failed presidential campaign, Navarro and the MAS members offer support to candidate Marco Enríquez-Ominami. For the presidential election of 2013, however, announced it will support Michelle Bachelet (PS), representative of the former Concertacion. Currently participating in the electoral coalition Nueva Mayoría. Some members did not support this decision and formed the United Left.

In 2014 it merged with the Northern Force Party, led by the mayor of Iquique, Jorge Soria, to form MAS Region. In 2016, Senator Navarro resigned the party and the Nueva Mayoría to form the new País party. In 2018, MAS Region merged with Citizen Left to become MAS Citizen Left.

== Presidential candidates ==
The following is a list of the presidential candidates supported by the Broad Social Movement. (Information gathered from the Archive of Chilean Elections).

- 2009: Marco Enríquez-Ominami (lost)
- 2013: Michelle Bachelet (won)
- 2017: Alejandro Guillier (lost)
