= Quirihue =

- City and Commune
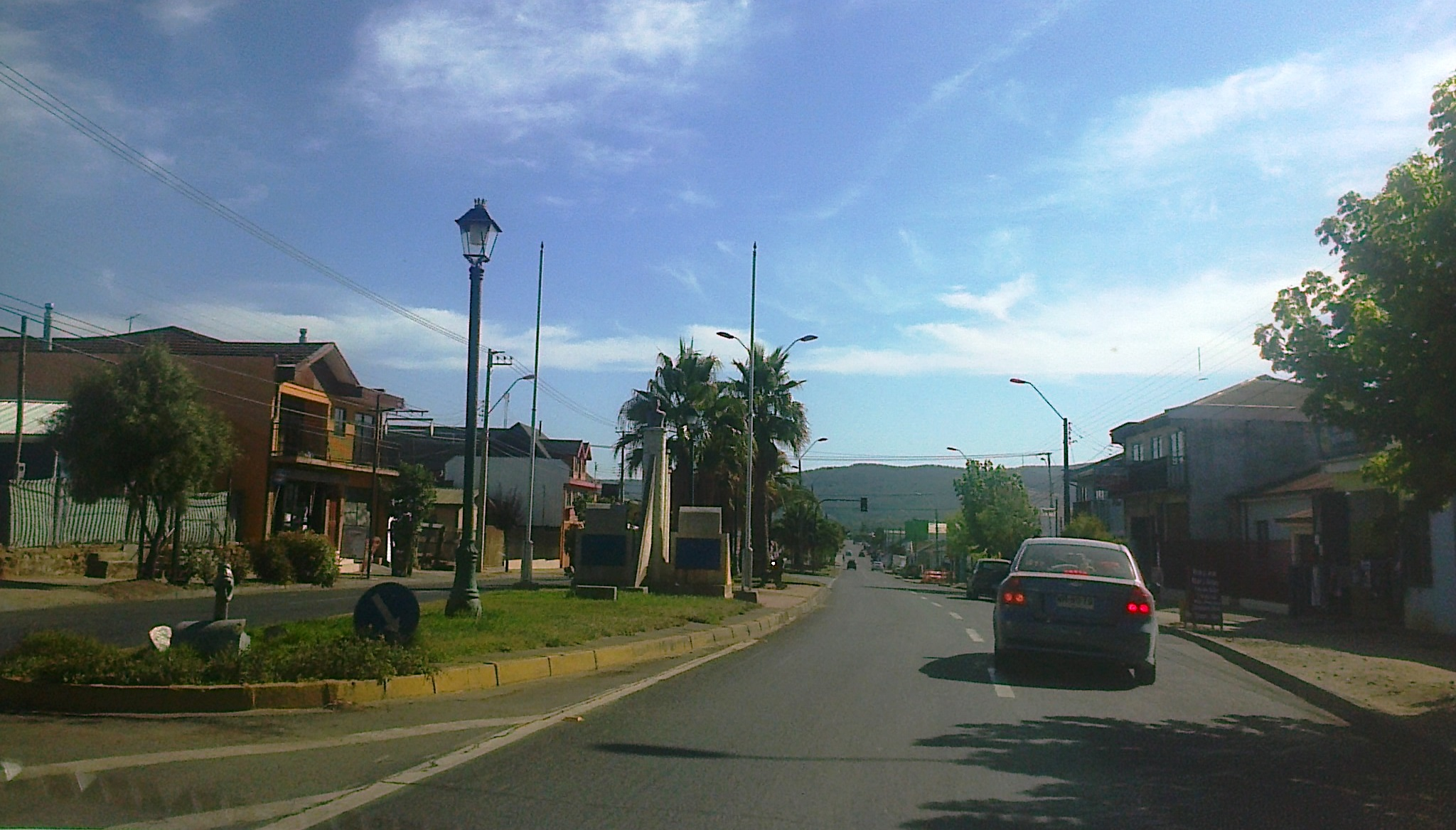

- Flag Coat of arms

- Location in Chile
- Coordinates: 36°17′S 72°32′W
- Country: Chile
- Region: Ñuble
- Province: Itata
- Founded: 17 January 1749
- Founded as: Villa San Antonio Abad of Quirihue

Government
  - Type: Municipality
  - Alcalde: Tomás Irribarra De La Torre (PRSD)

Area
  - Total: 589.0 km^{2} (227.4 sq mi)
- Elevation: 231 m (758 ft)

Population (2017 Census)
  - Total: 11,746
  - Density: 19.94/km^{2} (51.65/sq mi)
  - Urban: 9,399
  - Rural: 2,347

Sex
  - Men: 5,685
  - Women: 6,061
- Time zone: UTC−4 (CLT)
  - Summer (DST): UTC−3 (CLST)
- Area code: country 56 + city 42
- Website: www.muniquirihue.cl

Quirihue (Spanish pronunciation: [kiˈɾiwe]) is a city in Itata Province in the Ñuble Region of Chile. It is the administrative capital of the province. As per 2017 census, it had a population of 11,746 inhabitants.

== Geography ==
Quirihue is located in Itata Province in the Ñuble Region of Chile. It spans an area of 589 km^{2} (227 sq mi). It is the administrative capital of the Itata Province. The city has a Mediterranean climate. The region is prone to earthquakes, and the 2010 Chile earthquake, was one of the strongest in the 21st century and measured 8.8 on the Richter scale. The earthquake and the subsequent Tsunami, which originated off the coast of Quirihue, caused significant destruction and killed 523 people.

== Administration ==
As a commune, Quirihue is a third-level administrative division of Chile administered by a municipal council, headed by an alcalde who is directly elected every four years. The city's flag consists of two equal halves of white and blue. There is a red cross on the white half on the left, and a yellow colored lion and an eight pointed star on the blue half.

Within the electoral divisions of Chile, Quirihue is represented in the Chamber of Deputies as part of the 19th electoral district. The electoral district is formed by 22 communes and elects five members to the chamber. The commune is represented in the Senate by the 16th senatorial constituency of Nuble, which elects two members to the Senate.

== Demographics ==
According to the 2017 census conducted by the National Statistics Institute, Quirihue had a population of 11,746 inhabitants. The population consisted of 5,685 males and 6,061 females. About 80% of the population was classified as urban and rest as rural. About 1,915 (19%) of the population was below the age of fourteen. Majority (99.4%) of the population of the city were Chilean-born. Roman Catholics (68.5%) formed the major religious group with a significant minority (17.9%) of protestants.
