= List of towns in Chile =

This article contains a list of towns in Chile.

A town is defined by Chile's National Statistics Institute (INE) as an urban entity possessing between 2,001 and 5,000 inhabitants—or between 1,001 and 2,000 inhabitants if 50% or more of its population is economically active in secondary and/or tertiary activities. This list is based on a June 2005 report by the INE based on the 2002 census, which registered 274 towns across the country, however only 269 of them are shown here. (The higher number is based on the number given in the regional summary provided by the INE report. The lower number is based on a manual count of the report. The discrepancies are found in the Valparaíso Region (report: 31 / manual count: 28), the O'Higgins Region (report: 39 / manual count: 38) and the Los Ríos and Los Lagos Region combined (report: 31 / manual count: 30).)

== List of towns by region (269) ==
=== Arica and Parinacota Region (1) ===
- Putre

=== Tarapacá Region (3) ===
- Pica
- Collaguasi
- La Tirana
- La Huayca

=== Antofagasta Region (4) ===
- Cerro Moreno
- Juan López
- Hornitos
- San Pedro de Atacama

=== Atacama Region (7) ===
- Bahía Inglesa
- Loreto
- Puerto Viejo
- El Salado
- Flamenco
- Portal del Inca
- Freirina

=== Coquimbo Region (14) ===
- Las Tacas
- Tongoy
- Guanaqueros
- Puerto Velero
- La Higuera
- Canela Baja
- Pichidangui
- Quilimarí Alto
- Chillepín
- Guamalata
- La Chimba
- Sotaquí
- Chañaral Alto
- Punitaqui

=== Valparaíso Region (28) ===
- Laguna Verde
- Quintay
- San Juan Bautista
- Maitencillo
- Puchuncaví
- Hanga Roa
- San Rafael
- Placilla
- Valle Hermoso
- Los Quinquelles
- Pichicuy
- Los Molles
- Artificio
- Papudo
- Pullalli
- Chincolco
- Petorca
- Zapallar
- La Laguna de Zapallar
- Catapilco
- San Pedro
- El Yeco
- Mirasol
- Las Brisas
- Algarrobal-Punta El Olivo
- Curimón
- Panquehue
- El Llano

=== O'Higgins Region (38) ===
- La Compañía
- Coinco
- Coltauco
- Loreto-Molino
- Parral de Purén
- El Manzano
- Sewell
- Coya
- Pelequén
- Malloa
- Angostura
- La Punta
- Olivar Alto
- Pichidegua
- Rosario
- Esmeralda
- Los Lirios
- El Tambo
- Rastrojos
- Cáhuil
- La Estrella
- Costa de Sol
- Litueche
- Marchihue
- La Boca
- La Vega de Pupuya
- Paredones
- Bucalemu
- Angostura
- Chépica
- Auquinco
- Tinguiririca
- San Enrique de Romeral
- Lolol
- Cunaco
- Peralillo
- Población
- Placilla

=== Maule Region (35) ===
- Panguilemo
- Huilquilemu
- Santa Olga
- Los Pellines
- Curepto
- Empedrado
- Maule
- Chacarillas
- Pelarco
- Pencahue
- Cumpeo
- San Rafael
- Chanco
- Pelluhue
- Quilicura
- Sarmiento
- Villa Los Niches
- San Alberto
- Licantén
- Iloca
- Itahue Uno
- Rauco
- Romeral
- Sagrada Familia
- Villa Prat
- Lago Vichuquén
- Llico
- Vara Gruesa
- Las Obras
- Colbún
- Panimávida
- Retiro
- Copihue
- Bobadilla
- Yerbas Buenas

=== Ñuble Region (22) ===
- Campanario
- Cobquecura
- El Carmen
- El Emboque
- Las Mariposas
- Ninhue
- Ñipas
- Pemuco
- Pinto
- Quinchamalí
- Quiriquina
- Ranguelmo
- Recinto-Los Lleuques
- San Fabián de Alico
- San Gregorio
- San Ignacio
- Santa Clara
- San Nicolás
- Treguaco
- Portezuelo
- Pueblo Seco
- Puente Ñuble
- Villa Illinois

=== Biobío Region (27) ===
- Florida
- Monte Aguila
- Talcamávida
- Caleta Tumbes
- Dichato
- Rafael
- Santa Rosa
- Laraquete
- Ramadillas
- Carampangue
- Contulmo
- Curanilahue
- Antiguala
- Tirúa
- San Carlos de Purén
- Millantú
- Santa Fé
- Virquenco
- Antuco
- Negrete
- Coihue
- Quidico
- Quilaco
- Quilleco
- Las Canteras
- Villa Mercedes
- Tucapel
- Estación Yumbel
- Ralco
- Pehuén
- Punta de Parra
- Cachapoal
- Polcura

=== Araucanía Region (30) ===
- Trovolhue
- Los Laureles
- Curarrehue
- Quepe
- Galvarino
- Lastarria
- Pillanlelbún
- Huiscapi
- Melipeuco
- Perquenco
- Puerto Saavedra
- Barros Arana
- Teodoro Schmidt
- Gualpín
- Nueva Toltén
- Queule
- Vilcún
- Cherquenco
- Cajón
- Licán Ray
- Ñancul
- Cholchol
- Mininco
- Ercilla
- Pailahueque
- Lonquimay
- Los Sauces
- Lumaco
- Capitán Pastene
- Tijeral

=== Los Ríos Region (11) ===
- Niebla
- Corral
- Llifén
- Nontuela
- Lago Ranco
- Malalhue
- Máfil
- Mehuín
- Coñaripe
- Liquiñe
- Neltume

=== Los Lagos Region (19) ===
- Alerce
- Los Pellines
- Maullín
- Carelmapu
- Nueva Braunau
- Chonchi
- Dalcahue
- Queilén
- Quemchi
- Achao
- Puerto Octay
- Corte Alto
- Entre Lagos
- Bahía Mansa-Maicolpue
- San Pablo
- Chaitén
- Futaleufú
- Río Negro

=== Aisén Region (6) ===
- Villa Mañiguales
- Puerto Chacabuco
- Puerto Cisnes
- Melinka
- Cochrane
- Chile Chico

=== Magallanes Region (2) ===
- Puerto Williams
- Porvenir

=== Santiago Metropolitan Region (24) ===
- El Colorado
- La Parva
- El Maitén
- El Principal
- San Alfonso
- El Ingenio
- Santa Marta de Liray
- Chicureo
- Las Canteras
- Estación Colina
- Santa Sara
- Huertos Familiares
- Lo Herrera
- El Rulo
- Valdivia de Paine
- Viluco
- San Ignacio
- Huelquén
- Pintué-La Guachera
- Champa
- Bollenar
- Pomaire
- Villa Alhué
- María Pinto

== See also ==
- List of cities in Chile
- List of towns
