= 1960 Valdivia earthquake =

9.4–9.6 magnitude earthquake in Chile

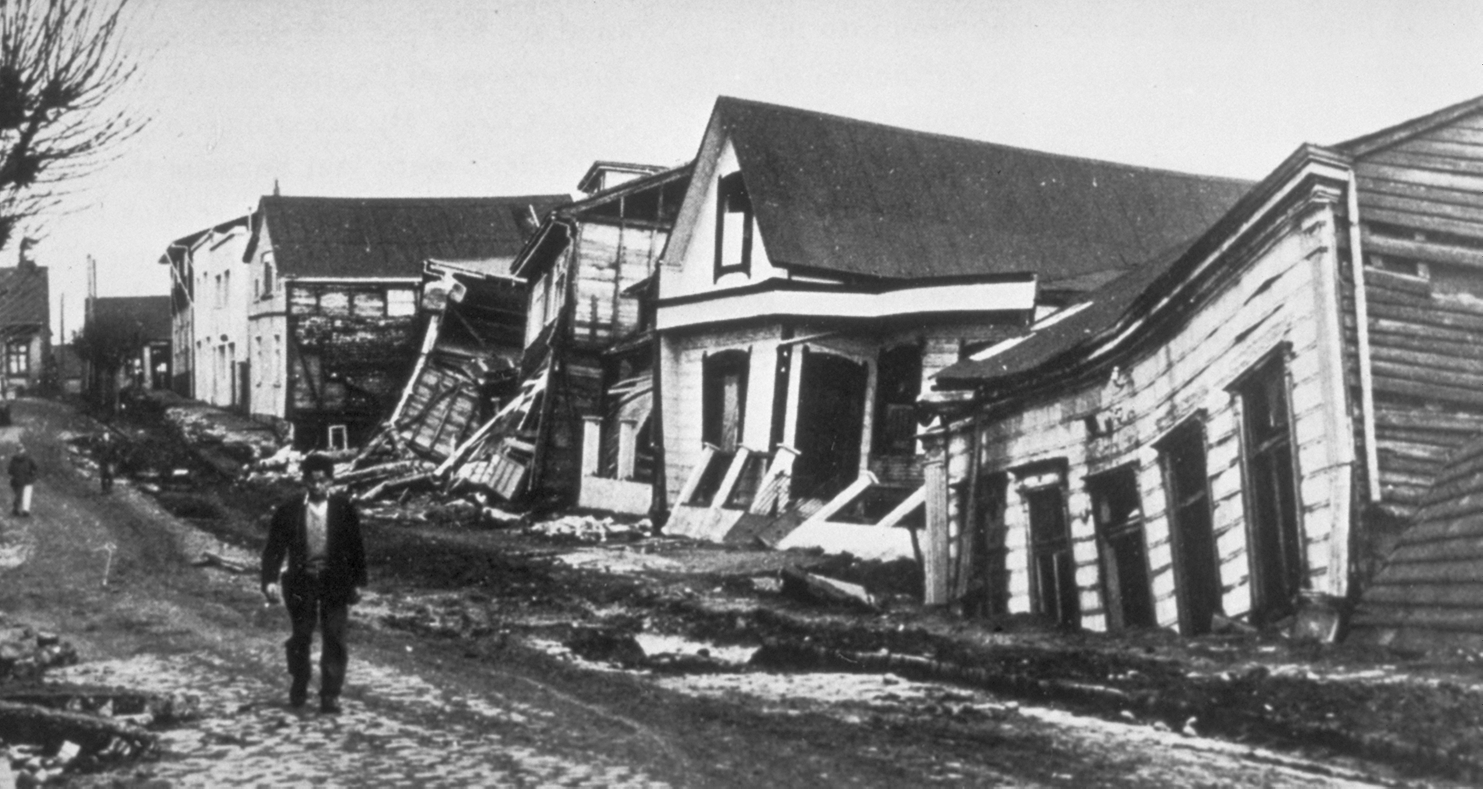
- Collapsed buildings in Valdivia

- UTC time: 1960-05-22 19:11:14
- ISC event: 879136
- USGS-ANSS: ComCat
- Local date: 22 May 1960
- Local time: 15:11:14
- Duration: 10 minutes
- Magnitude: 9.4–9.6 M_{w}
- Depth: 25 km (16 mi)
- Epicenter: 38.24°S 73.05°W
- Type: Megathrust
- Areas affected: Chile, Pacific Rim
- Max. intensity: MMI XII (Extreme)
- Peak acceleration: 2.93 g
- Peak velocity: 311 cm/s
- Tsunami: Up to 25 m (82 ft)
- Landslides: Yes
- Casualties: 1,886–6,000 dead

On 22 May 1960, an earthquake and tsunami occurred in Chile, devastating the city of Valdivia. Most studies have placed it at 9.4–9.6 on the moment magnitude scale, making it the strongest earthquake ever recorded, while some studies have placed the magnitude lower than 9.4. It occurred in the afternoon (19:11:14 UTC, 15:11:14 local time), and lasted 10 minutes. The resulting tsunamis affected southern Chile, Hawaii, Japan, the Philippines, eastern New Zealand, southeast Australia, and the Aleutian Islands.

The epicenter of this megathrust earthquake was near Lumaco, approximately 570 kilometres (350 mi) south of Santiago, with Valdivia being the most affected city. The tremor caused localized tsunamis that severely battered the Chilean coast, with waves up to 25 metres (82 ft). The main tsunami traveled across the Pacific Ocean and devastated Hilo, Hawaii, where waves as high as 10.7 metres (35 ft) were recorded over 10,000 kilometres (6,200 mi) from the epicenter.

The death toll and monetary losses arising from this widespread disaster are not certain. Various estimates of the total number of fatalities from the earthquake and tsunamis have surfaced, ranging between 1,000 and 6,000 killed. Different sources have estimated the monetary cost ranged from US$400 million to $800 million (or US$4.4 billion to $8.7 billion in 2025, adjusted for inflation).

== Geological context ==
Chile is located along the Pacific Ring of Fire, a known zone of high seismicity. The earthquake was a megathrust earthquake resulting from the release of mechanical stress between the subducting Nazca plate and South American plate on the Peru–Chile Trench, off the coast of southern Chile. Because of its geography, Chile remains one of the most seismically active countries in the world.

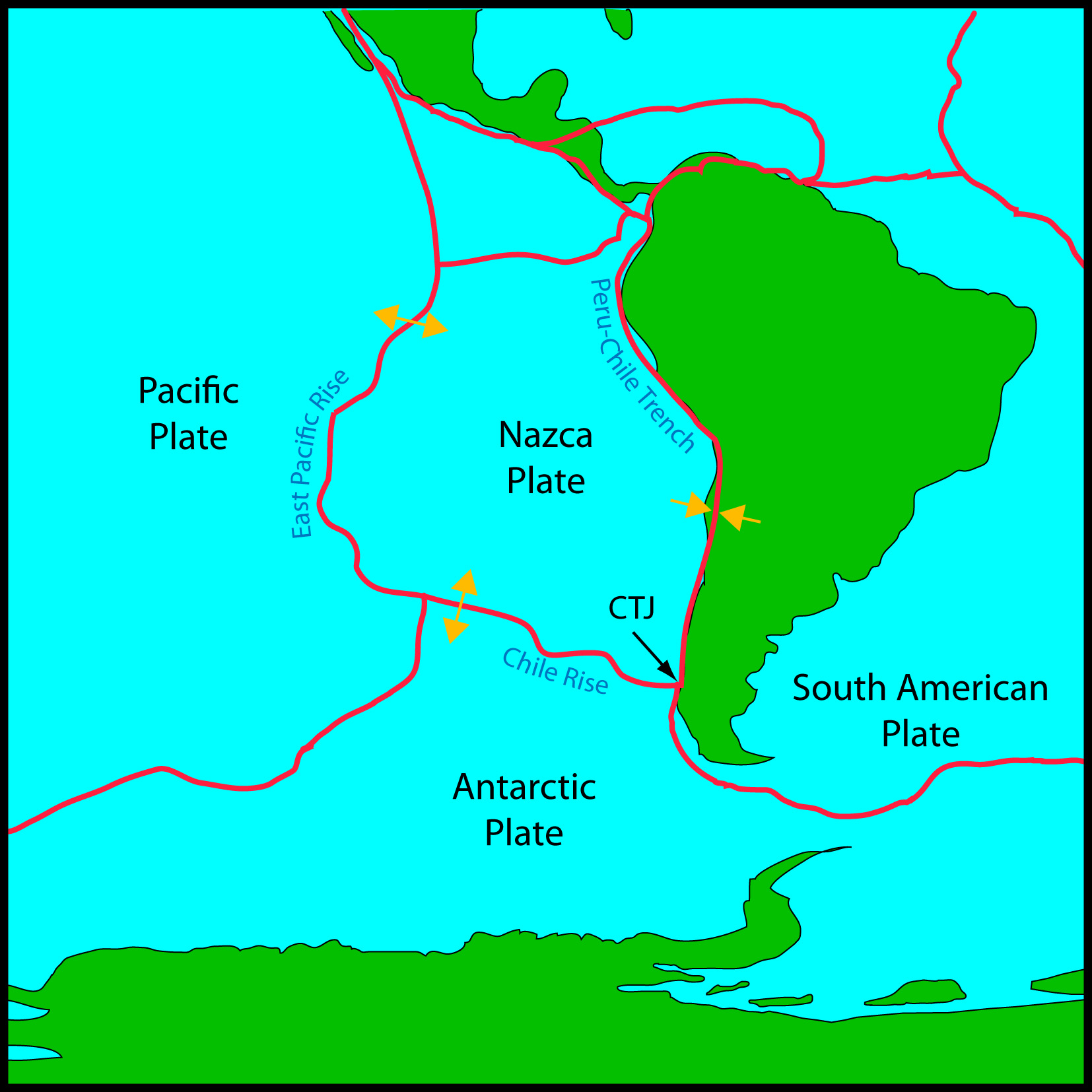
Chile at the intersection between the Nazca and South American plates, with arrows depicting directionality of plate movements

=== Tectonic interpretation ===
The Valdivia earthquake (light blue at the bottom left of this graph) released almost a quarter of all global seismic energy between 1906 and 2005

The focus of the earthquake was relatively shallow at 33 km (21 mi), considering that earthquakes in northern Chile and Argentina may reach depths of 70 km (43 mi).

A 2019 research paper postulates that the Liquiñe-Ofqui fault had a M_{w}9.07 strike-slip sub-event along with the M_{w}9.37 main thrust sub-event which could help account for how the plate boundary event seemingly "overspent" its tectonic budget. In other words, the previous and current more widely accepted explanation for the earthquake involves the Peru-Chile Trench slipping further than its accumulated slip deficit (the amount of slip available for an earthquake) should allow. The alternative explanation, with two faults slipping nearly simultaneously, could help explain the true mechanism of the earthquake.

Subduction zones are known to produce the strongest earthquakes on Earth, as their particular structure allows more stress to build up before energy is released. Geophysicists consider it a matter of time before this earthquake will be surpassed in magnitude by another. The earthquake's rupture zone was ≈ 800 km (500 mi) long, stretching from Arauco (37° S) to below the Chiloé Archipelago (44° S). Rupture velocity, the speed at which a rupture front expands across the surface of the fault, has been estimated as 3.5 km (2.2 mi) per second. The average slip across all 27 Nazca sub-faults was estimated to be 11 m, with 25–30 m of slip 200–500 km south of the epicenter on offshore sub-faults.

While the Valdivia earthquake was extraordinarily large, the 2016 Chiloé earthquake hints that it did not release all the potential slip in that segment of the plate interface.

== Earthquake sequence ==
=== Concepción earthquakes ===
The 1960 Chilean earthquakes were a sequence of strong earthquakes that affected Chile between 21 May and 6 June 1960, centered in the Cautín, Malleco, Aysén, and Biobío provinces of the country. The first three quakes, all registering in the planet's top 10 by magnitude for 1960, are grouped together as the 1960 Concepción earthquakes. The first of these was the 8.1 M_{w} Concepción earthquake at 06:02 UTC-4 on 21 May 1960. Its epicenter was near Curanilahue. The second and third Concepción earthquakes occurred the next day at 06:32 UTC-4 (7.1 M_{w}) and 14:55 UTC-4 (7.8 M_{w}) on 22 May. These earthquakes formed a southward migrating foreshock sequence to the main Valdivia shock, which occurred just 15 minutes after the third event.

The earthquake interrupted and effectively ended a protest by coal miners from Lota, who were attempting to march to Concepción to demand higher salaries.

=== Valdivia, Chile earthquake ===
The Valdivia earthquake occurred at 15:11 UTC-4 on 22 May, and affected all of Chile between Talca and Chiloé Island, more than 400,000 square kilometres (150,000 sq mi). Coastal villages, such as Toltén, were struck. At Corral, the main port of Valdivia, the water level rose 4 m (13 ft) before it began to recede. At 16:20 UTC-4, a wave of 8 m (26 ft) struck the Chilean coast, mainly between Concepción and Chiloé. Another wave measuring 10 m (33 ft) was reported ten minutes later.

Hundreds of people were already reported dead by the time the tsunami struck. One ship, Canelo, starting at the mouth of the Valdivia River, sank after being moved 1.5 km (0.93 mi) backward and forward in the river; as of 2005, its mast was still visible from the road to Niebla.

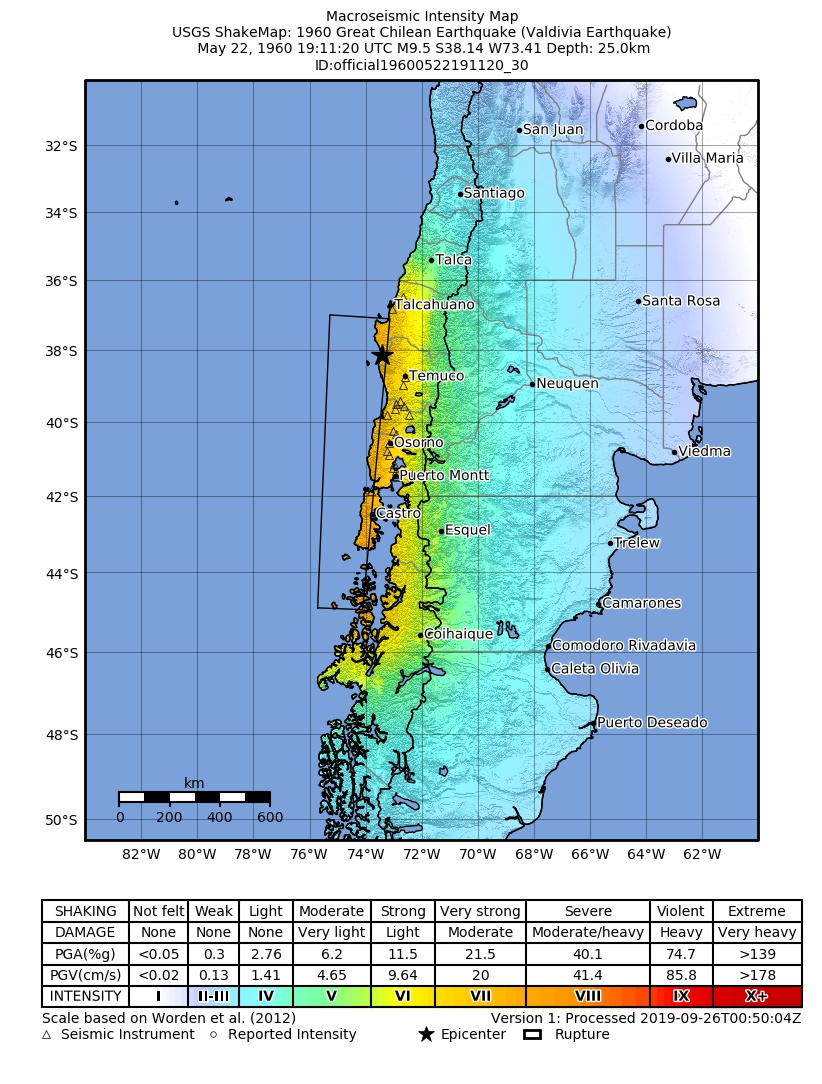
USGS ShakeMap for the mainshock

Soil subsidence also destroyed buildings, deepened local rivers and created wetlands in such places as the Río Cruces and Chorocomayo, a new aquatic park north of the city. Extensive areas of the city were flooded. The electricity and water systems of Valdivia were completely destroyed. Witnesses reported underground water flowing up through the soil. Despite the heavy rains of 21 May, the city was without a water supply. The river turned brown with sediment from landslides and was full of floating debris, including entire houses. The lack of potable water became a serious problem in one of Chile's rainiest regions.

The earthquake did not strike all the territory with the same strength; measured with the Mercalli scale, tectonically depressed areas suffered heavier damage. The two most affected areas were Valdivia and Puerto Octay, near the northwest corner of Llanquihue Lake. Puerto Octay was the center of a north–south elliptical area in the Central Valley, where the intensity was at the highest outside the Valdivia Basin. East of Puerto Octay, in a hotel in Todos los Santos Lake, stacked dishes were reported to have remained in place. With the exception of poor building sites, the zone of Mercalli scales intensities of VII or more all lay west of the Andes in a strip running from Lota (37° S) southwards. The area of intensities of VII or more did not penetrate into the Central Valley north of Lleulleu Lake (38° S) and south of Castro (42.5° S). Two days after the earthquake Cordón Caulle, a volcanic vent close to Puyehue volcano, erupted. Other volcanoes may also have erupted, but none were recorded because of the lack of communication in Chile at the time. The relatively low death toll in Chile (5,700) is explained in part by the low population density in the region, and by building practices that took into account the area's high geological activity.

Earthquake lights were reported in Purén.

=== Aftershocks ===
One of the main aftershocks occurred on 6 June in Aysén Province. This magnitude 7.7 earthquake probably occurred along the Liquiñe-Ofqui Fault, meaning that the fault would have moved as a consequence of the 22 May Valdivia earthquake.

== Natural disasters ==
=== Tsunamis ===
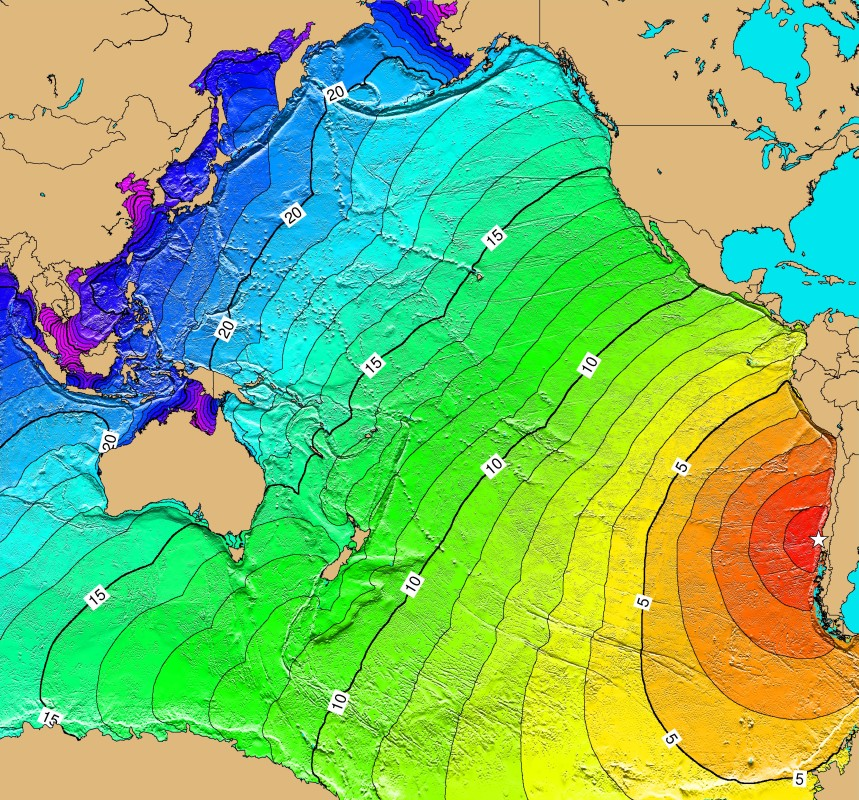
Travel time of the tsunami across the Pacific Ocean at one-hour intervals

Earthquake-induced tsunamis affected southern Chile, Hawaii, Japan, the Philippines, China, eastern New Zealand, southeast Australia, and the Aleutian Islands. Some localized tsunamis severely battered the Chilean coast, with waves up to 25 m (82 ft). The main tsunami crossed the Pacific Ocean at a speed of several hundred km/h and devastated Hilo, Hawaii, killing 61 people. Most of the tsunami-related deaths in Japan occurred in the northeast Sanriku region of Honshu.

The Chilean coast was devastated by a tsunami from Mocha Island (38° S) to Aysén Province (45° S). Across southern Chile, the tsunami caused huge loss of life, damage to port infrastructure, and the loss of many small boats. Further north, the port of Talcahuano did not suffer any major damage, only some flooding. Some tugboats and small sailboats were stranded on Rocuant Island near Talcahuano.

In Valdivia, the tsunami swell penetrated along Calle-Calle River as far as Huellelhue, putting ashore piles of firewood that lay in the fields.

After the 21 May Concepción earthquake, people in Ancud sought refuge in boats. A carabinero (police) boat, Gloria, was towing a few of these boats when the second earthquake struck on 22 May. As the sea regressed Gloria became stranded between Cerro Guaiguén and Cochinos Island. The stranded boat was wrecked when a tsunami wave engulfed it.

All the new infrastructure of the small port of Bahía Mansa was destroyed by the tsunami, which reached heights of up to 10 metres above sea level there. The boat Isabella in Bahía Mansa quickly left the port but lost its anchors.

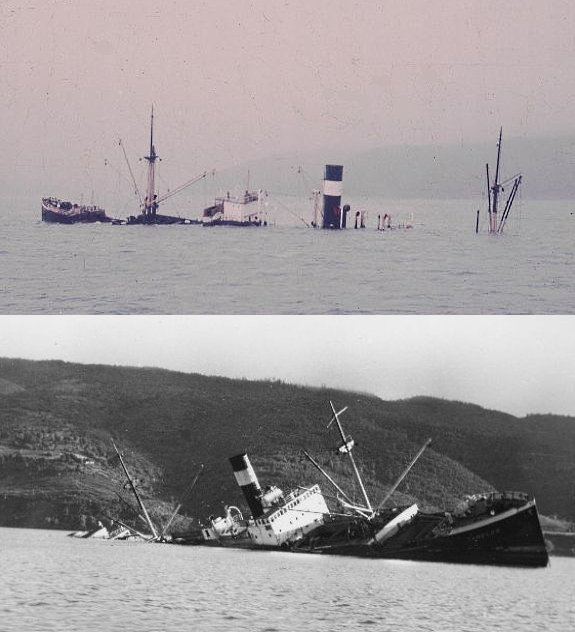
Wrecks of Carlos Haverbeck (top) and Canelo (bottom).

In the Valdivia River and Corral Bay, several vessels were wrecked by the earthquake, among them Argentina, Canelo, Carlos Haverbeck, Melita, and the salvaged remnants of Penco. Canelo was anchored at Corral when the quake struck, filling a cargo of wood and other products destined for northern Chile. The engine of Canelo was warmed up after the earthquake. After hours of drifting around in Corral Bay and Valdivia River, the ship was wrecked and subsequently abandoned by its crew at 1800 local time. Two men on board Canelo died in the incident. As of 2000, the remnants of Canelo were still visible.

Santiago, another ship anchored at Corral at the time of the quake, managed to leave Corral in a bad state but was wrecked off the coast of Mocha Island on 24 May. The schooner La Milagrosa departed from Queule on 22 May to load a cargo of Fitzroya wood shingles in a small port south of Corral. La Milagrosa was battered by the currents and waves of the tsunami for four days while moving south. Outside Corral the crew rescued six nearly unconscious and dehydrated children on board two boats. The boats found were used to navigate in Valdivia River and Corral Bay but had drifted into the high sea.

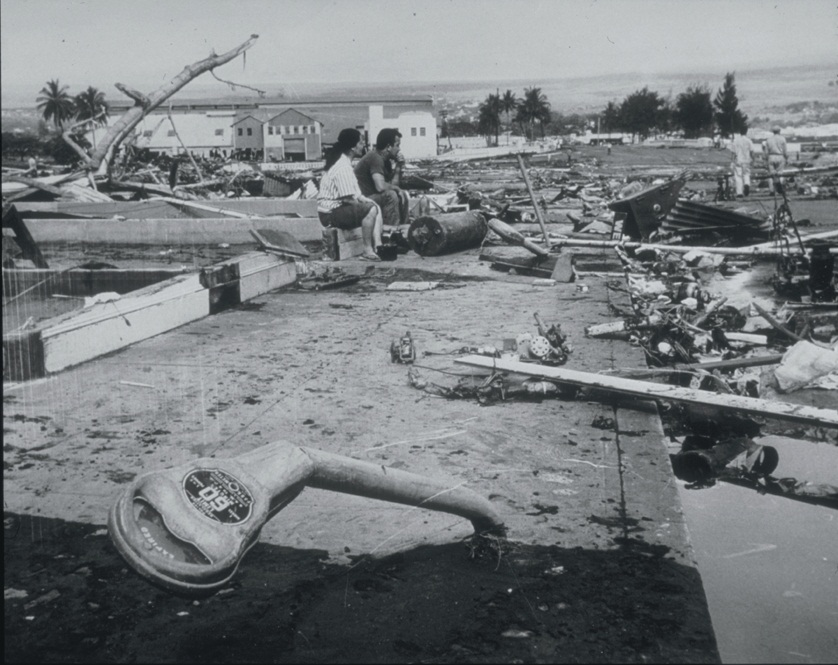
Hilo, Hawaii, after the tsunami

The coastal localities of Nilahue and Mehuín were struck by the tsunami, causing the loss of fishing boats. 150 boats, most of them used for fishing, were reported to have "disappeared" in Mehuín. Some kilometres north of Mahuín in the coastal town of Queule, a carabinero reported hundreds of people dead or missing some days after the tsunami. Historians Yoselin Jaramillo and Ismael Basso report that people in Queule decades later knew about 50 people to have died because of the earthquake and tsunami.

=== Landslides ===
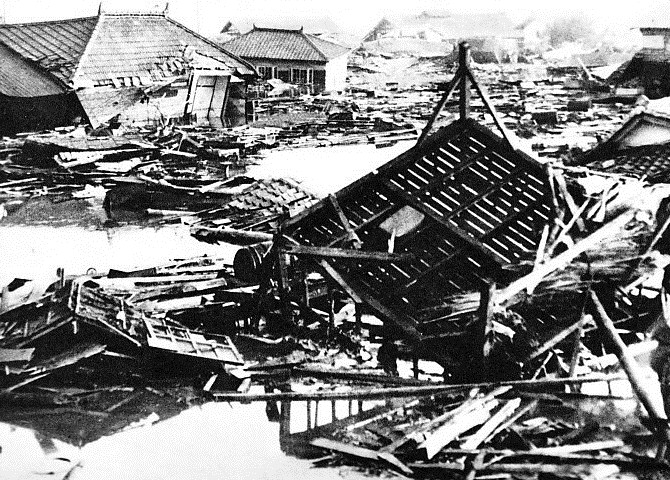
Effect of the tsunami at Kamaishi, Japan

The earthquake triggered numerous landslides, mainly in the steep glacial valleys of the southern Andes. Within the Andes, most landslides occurred on forested mountain slopes around the Liquiñe-Ofqui Fault. Some of these areas remain sparsely vegetated while others have naturally developed more or less pure stands of Nothofagus dombeyi. These landslides did not cause many fatalities nor significant economic losses because most of the areas were uninhabited, with only minor roads.

One landslide caused destruction following its blockage of the outflow of Riñihue Lake (see below). About 100 km (62 mi) south of Riñihue Lake, landslides in the mountains around Golgol River caused the river to dam up; when it burst through the earthen dam, it created a flood down to Puyehue Lake. The Golgol landslides destroyed parts of international Route 215-CH, which connects to Bariloche in Argentina through Cardenal Antonio Samoré Pass.

While most landslides clustered around north–south strips in the Andes, other areas that were affected by large numbers of landslides were the coast, mainly the foot of the Chilean Coast Range, and the shores of Llanquihue Lake.

=== Seiches ===
A seiche (type of standing wave) of more than 1 meter was observed on Panguipulli Lake following the earthquake. On 22 May, a seiche occurred also in Nahuel Huapi Lake, on the Argentine side of the Andes, more than 200 km away from Valdivia. The wave, most likely produced by an earthquake-triggered sediment slide at the lake bottom, killed two people and destroyed a pier in San Carlos de Bariloche city.

=== Riñihue Lake's flood ===
During the Great Chilean earthquake, several landslides west of Tralcán Mountain blocked the outflow of Riñihue Lake. Riñihue Lake is the lowest of the Seven Lakes chain and receives a constant inflow from the Enco River. The dammed San Pedro River, which drains the lake, passes through several towns before reaching the city of Valdivia near the coast.

As the San Pedro River was impounded, the water level of Riñihue Lake started to rise quickly. Each meter the water level rose was equivalent to 20 million cubic meters, which meant that 480 million cubic meters of water would release into the San Pedro River, easily overpowering its flow capacity of 400 cubic metres (14,000 cu ft) per second if it rose above the final, 24-meter-high dam. This potential disaster would have violently flooded all the settlements along the course of the river in less than five hours, with more dire consequences if the dam suddenly broke.

About 100,000 people lived in the affected zone. Plans were made to evacuate Valdivia, and many people left. To avoid the destruction of the city, several military units and hundreds of workers from ENDESA, CORFO, and MOP started an effort to control the lake. Twenty-seven bulldozers were put into service, but they had severe difficulties moving in the mud near the dams, so dykes had to be constructed with shovels from June onwards. The work was not restricted to the lake; drainages from other parts of the Seven Lakes were dammed to minimize additional flow into Riñihue Lake. These dams were removed later, with the exception of Calafquén Lake, which still retains its dam.

By 23 June, the main dam had been lowered from 24 to 15 m (79 to 49 ft), allowing 3 billion cubic metres of water to leave the lake gradually, but still with considerable destructive power. The team was led by ENDESA engineer Raúl Sáez.

=== Cordón Caulle eruption ===
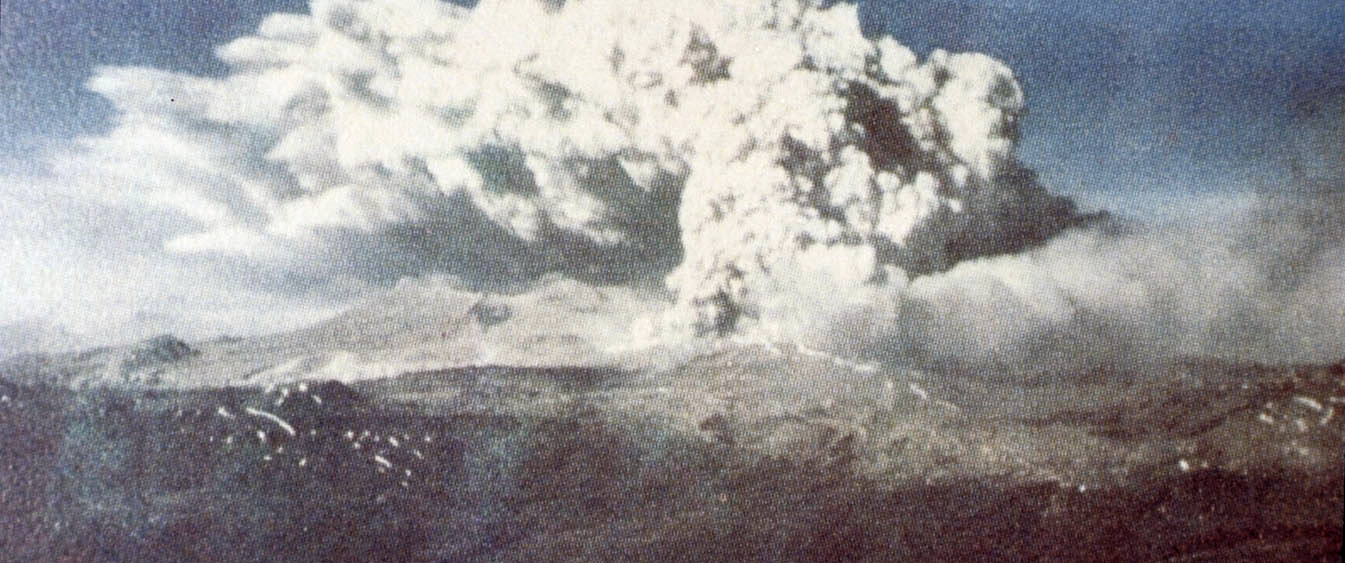
Eruption of Cordón Caulle following the earthquake

On 24 May, 38 hours after the main shock of the 1960 Valdivia earthquake, the Cordón Caulle volcano erupted. The eruption was believed to have been triggered by the earthquake. Between two sparsely populated and isolated Andean valleys, the eruption had few eyewitnesses and received little attention by local media, which was preoccupied with the severe and widespread damage and losses caused by the earthquake. The eruption was first noticed and reported as an explosion by the crew of a United States Air Force plane that was heading to Santiago from Puerto Montt.

The eruption fed a 5.5 km-long fissure on 135° heading where 21 individual vents have been found. These vents produced an output of about 0.25 km^{3} DRE both in form of lava flows and tephra. The eruption ended on 22 July, 59 days later.

As a result of an evacuation plan, there were no reported human deaths associated with the eruption.

== Consequences and response ==
=== Urban impact ===
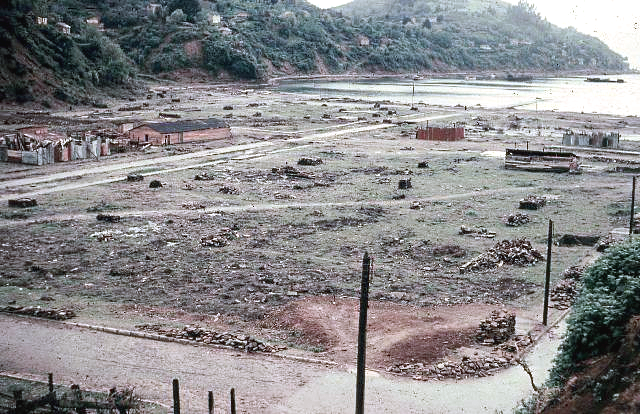
The destroyed center of Corral, Chile

The levels of material damage were relatively low despite the high magnitude of the earthquake. Part of the reason behind this was the limited infrastructure development of the region next to the rupture zone. Structures that had been designed to resist earthquakes performed well during the earthquake, chiefly suffering damage when affected by soil subsidence or small fault movements. Houses built by their owners fared badly. In the provinces of Curicó, Talca, Maule and Bío Bío, houses built from adobe and masonry proved weak, while from Malleco to the south weak houses were mainly those built with inappropriate wood that had decayed over time.

It has been estimated that about 40 percent of the houses in Valdivia were destroyed, leaving 20,000 people homeless. The most affected structures were those built of concrete, which in some cases collapsed completely, because they were not built using modern earthquake engineering. Traditional wooden houses fared better; although many were uninhabitable if they did not collapse. Houses built upon elevated areas suffered considerably less damage compared to those on the lowlands, which absorbed great amounts of energy. Many city blocks with destroyed buildings in the city center remained empty until the 1990s and 2000s, with some of them still used as parking lots. Before the earthquake, some of these blocks had modern concrete buildings built after the Great Valdivia fire of 1909. Around the main city square most buildings collapsed except for Edificio Prales and a few others.

The hospital of Valdivia, built in 1939, suffered major damage and patients had to be evacuated. The United States quickly set up a field hospital following the earthquake. Aided by the United States, a geological survey of Valdivia was done following the earthquake and resulted in the city's first geological map. Mexico built and donated the public school Escuela México after the earthquake.

Valdivia's bridges suffered only minor damage. The damage caused to Calle-Calle Bridge led to its temporary closure after the earthquake, with traffic redirected to Teja Island through Caucau River where people crossed it on boats and, reportedly, also a rudimentary and temporary wooden bridge.

Land subsidence in Corral Bay improved navigability as shoal banks, produced earlier by sediments from Madre de Dios and other nearby gold mines, sank and were compacted. As the earthquake destroyed Valdivia's flood barriers, general land subsidence exposed new areas to flooding. Parts of the botanical garden of the Austral University of Chile that were next to Cau-Cau River and the city's southern outskirts along Route 206 were permanently flooded.

The earthquakes damaged an area that had suffered a long period of economic decline, which began with shifts in trade routes due to the expansion of railroads in southern Chile and the opening of the Panama Canal in 1914.

Unlike Valdivia, Osorno was saved from major destruction. In Osorno only about 20 houses were totally destroyed, although many firewalls and chimneys collapsed.

Puerto Montt, a major city today, had in the early 1960s about 49,500 inhabitants. The bulk of the damage in Puerto Montt was located in the neighborhood of Barrio Modelo and the northern part of Bahía Angelmó, where artificial fills subsided. Angelmó and other coastal areas of Puerto Montt were among the few urban areas that suffered "total destruction" by the earthquake.

After the earthquake a myth related the unusually warm and clear weather conditions prior to the earthquake to its triggering. When compared with the years that followed in the 1960s the autumn of 1960 in southern Chile was not particularly dry nor warm.

=== Impact in the countryside ===
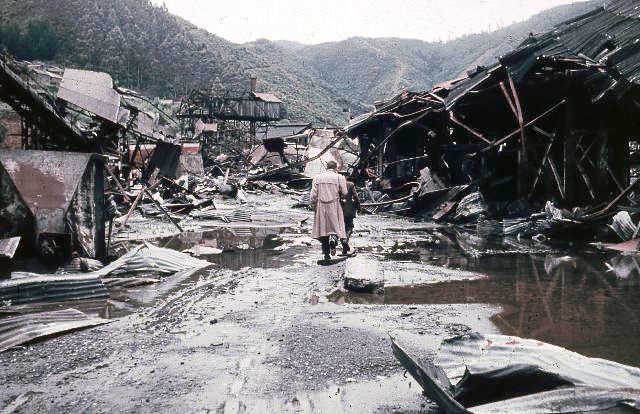
Destroyed infrastructure of Altos Hornos y Acerías de Corral, a steel factory closed a few years before the earthquake.

The tsunami that struck the coast of southern Chile destroyed seaside farms, killing numerous livestock and people. Barns and industrial structures were destroyed by the quake. The dairy industry was among the few industries of the affected zone that received subsidies and investment after the earthquake. It received state support through a long-term policy after the earthquake.

As a result of the earthquake, an international technological cooperation programme was established in the dairy sector. More specifically, the German and Danish governments helped to create the Centro Tecnológico de la Leche (the Milk Technological Centre) in the Southern University of Chile. The scholar Erik Dahmén believes that the earthquake resulted in a "creative destruction" for farmers of Southern Chile.

A large area of former pastures and cultivated fields around the lower course of Cruces River was permanently flooded as a result of c. 2 m of subsidence caused by the earthquake. Over the years the new wetlands were colonized chiefly by Egeria densa (Spanish: luchecillo). Egeria densa and other plants created a rich aquatic ecosystem that attracted a permanent bird fauna, notably black-necked swans. The protected area of Carlos Anwandter Nature Sanctuary was created in 1981 to protect the ecosystem.

A whole neighbourhood of Corral, Corral Bajo was wiped by the tsunami, while the nearby upper area, Corral Alto, suffered the loss of about 20 to 30% of its houses. Among the material loses were a series of stilt houses between Corral Bajo and Amargos. After the earthquake many families in Corral relocated to the neighbourhood of La Aguada.

The economy of the coastal town of Queule had during the 1950s developed significantly. Its economy based on fishing, agriculture and industry had grown. Queule was connected by road in 1957 to the rest of the country and the town had developed into a balneario (resort town). This era of prosperity ended with the 1960 earthquake.

Further north the earthquake destroyed numerous houses in the coal-mining town of Lebu.

The coal mine of Pupunahue suffered severe damage which led to coal production recovering to "acceptable levels" only by 1963.

=== Creation of a national emergency management agency ===
After the earthquake, the Chilean Ministry of Economics began to develop a comprehensive reconstruction plan. The efforts of President Alessandri led to the creation of a new institutionality in order to facilitate future emergency preparation and to tackle the country's recovery after the earthquake. The then-newly named Ministry of Economics and Reconstruction was given the task of coordinating rebuilding efforts in joint venture with CORFO, an existing Chilean agency for the promotion of economic growth. Concomitantly, a ministerial-level committee, COPERE (Comisión de Planificación de la Economía y de Reconstrucción), was officially named as the government's Planning and Reconstruction Committee. CORFO acted the secretariat of the committee and was entrusted with the preparation of the reconstruction plan and its detailed execution. COPERE had also been entrusted with coordinating provincial activities while CORFO remained the technical secretariat of those provincial committees. A comprehensive national plan for emergencies that helped Chile better prepare for future disasters was enacted, in conjunction with legislation that increased the powers of the President in times of national emergency. CORFO also created the National Company of Telecommunications (ENTEL) out of a pressing need to improve and modernize communication efforts in times of disaster.

In 1974, after the 1971 eruption of Villarrica volcano, COPERE was officially succeeded by ONEMI (Ministry of Interior National Emergency Office)—Chile's modern-day emergency management agency—when it was authorized by law as an independent governmental office by President Salvador Allende.

=== Human sacrifice ===
In the coastal village Collileufu (Cautín Province), native Lafkenches carried out a human sacrifice during the days following the main earthquake. Collileufu is located in the Budi Lake area, south of Puerto Saavedra, which was highly isolated in 1960. The Mapuche spoke primarily Mapudungun. The community had gathered in Cerro La Mesa, while the lowlands were struck by successive tsunamis. Juana Namuncura Añen, a local machi, demanded the sacrifice of the grandson of Juan Painecur, a neighbor, in order to calm the earth and the ocean. The victim was 5-year-old José Luis Painecur, an "orphan" (huacho) whose mother had gone to work as a domestic worker in Santiago and left her son under the care of his father.

The sacrifice was learned about by authorities after a boy in the commune of Nueva Imperial denounced to local leaders the theft of two horses; these were allegedly eaten during the sacrifice ritual. Two men were charged with the crime of murder and confessed, but later recanted. They were released from prison after two years. A judge ruled that those involved had "acted without free will, driven by an irresistible natural force of ancestral tradition". The story was mentioned in a Time magazine article, although with little detail.

== Previous and subsequent earthquakes ==
An earthquake of similar magnitude occurred in this area around 1800 BC, as has been determined by dating charcoal and shells washed into the Atacama Desert by the tsunami. This apparently caused the hunter-gatherers of the area to stop living near the coast for the next thousand years or so.

There is evidence that a similar earthquake and landslide occurred in 1575 in Valdivia. This earthquake was of similar strength and also caused a Riñihuazo. According to the chronicle of Mariño de Lobera, corregidor of Valdivia in 1575, a landslide blocked the outflow of the lagoon of Renigua. Several months later in April, it caused a flood. He said that the Spanish settlers had evacuated and waited on high ground until after the dam burst, but many aboriginals died in the flood waters. While the 1575 earthquake is considered the one most similar to that of 1960, it differed in not having caused any tsunami in Japan.

Other lesser earthquakes that preceded the 1960 event occurred in 1737 and 1837.

On 27 February 2010 at 03:34 local time, an 8.8 magnitude earthquake occurred just to the north (off the coast of the Maule region of Chile, between Concepción and Santiago). This quake was reported to be centered approximately 35 kilometres (22 mi) deep and several miles off shore. It may have been related or consequential to the 1960 Valdivia quake, the strongest as recorded using modern technology. This 2010 earthquake was the largest to affect Valdivia since the 1960 event. Thirty five houses were severely damaged and some 44 other suffered reparable damage. A survey showed that 434 persons in Valdivia had their homes damaged by the earthquake. The damage was to areas of poor soil quality, chiefly former wetlands and artificial fills. Some sidewalks near the river shore in Valdivia cracked and collapsed much like in the 1960 earthquake. Overall the 2010 areas of damage in Valdivia were few and highly localized.

== See also ==
- 1964 Villarrica eruption
- Geology of Chile
- Great Chilean drought of 1968–1969
- List of earthquakes in 1960
- List of earthquakes in Chile
- List of largest earthquakes by magnitude
- List of megathrust earthquakes
