= Mininco (disambiguation) =

Mininco is a locality in Collipulli, Chile.

Mininco may also refer to:

- Mininco River, a river in south-central Chile
- Mininco Formation, a geological formation in Chile
- Forestal Mininco, a forestry company in Chile
