= La Compañía =

La Compañía may refer to:

- La Compañía (Chile), a town
- La Compañía (Mexico), a municipality of Oaxaca
- La Compañía, a 1991 album by Iván Villazón

== See also ==
- Church of La Compañía (disambiguation)
