= Los Pellines =

Llos Pellines may refer to:

- Los Pellines, Los Ríos Region, a rural area in southern Chile
- Los Pellines, Los Lagos Region, a small town in southern Chile
