= U40 =

U40 may refer to:

== Naval vessels ==
- German submarine U-40, various vessels
- SM U-40 (Austria-Hungary), a submarine of the Austro-Hungarian Navy
- HMIS Narbada (U40), a sloop of the Royal Indian Navy

== Other uses ==
- Chile Route U-40, a road
- Snub dodecadodecahedron
