= Hornitos =

Hornitos is a Spanish term meaning "little ovens". It may refer to any of the following:

== Settlements ==
- Hornitos, California
- Hornitos, Chile

== Other ==
- Hornitos, a brand of tequila produced by Sauza Tequila
- Hornito, volcanic landform
