= Luis Zambrano (footballer) =

Chilean footballer

Personal information
- Full name: Luis Alberto Zambrano Arce
- Date of birth: 15 January 1964 (age 62)
- Place of birth: Carampangue, Chile
- Position: Striker

Youth career
- Maitenes
- 1977–1980: Huachipato

Senior career*
Years	Team	Apps	(Gls)
1979–1980	Huachipato		
1981–1985	Deportes Victoria		
1985–1988	Fernández Vial	50	(9)
1989	O'Higgins	19	(3)
1990–1995	Huachipato	155	(39)
1996	Ñublense	25	(13)
1997	Santiago Morning	26	(15)
1998	Ñublense		

International career
1984	Chile U23	3	(0)

Managerial career
- Portland City United
- * Club domestic league appearances and goals

Luis Alberto Zambrano Arce (born 15 January 1964), known as Carampangue Zambrano, is a Chilean former professional footballer who played as a striker. He is the third top goalscorer for Huachipato in the club history with 61 goals in total.

== Club career ==
Born in Carampangue, Chile, Zambrano was trained at club Maitenes from his hometown and Huachipato.

A remembered player for Huachipato and Fernández Vial, Zambrano also played for Deportes Victoria, O'Higgins, Ñublense and Santiago Morning.

As a player of Deportes Victoria, Zambrano became the goalscorer in the 1982 Tercera División and could sign for a European club in the mid-80s, according to himself.

In 1997, Zambrano and Pedro Reyes were honored as the best representatives of the footballers by Chilean referees.

== International career ==
Zambrano represented Chile at under-23 level under Isaac Carrasco in the 1984 Merlion Cup.

== Coaching career ==
Zambrano graduated as a soccer coach in the United States and trained Portland City United Soccer Club (PCU) for about five years.

== Personal life ==
Zambrano has lived for over 20 years in the United States and worked in construction.

== Honours ==
Individual

- Tercera División de Chile Top Goalscorer: 1982
- Segunda División de Chile South Zone - Top Goalscorer: 1984
