= Tinguiririca =

Tinguiririca may refer to:

- Tinguiririca, Chile
- Tinguiririca fauna
- Tinguiririca River
- Tinguiririca (volcano)

== See also ==
- Uruguayan Air Force Flight 571 near Tinguiririca (volcano)
