= Chile Route U-40 =

Highway in Chile

Route U-40 is a primary regional road in Osorno Province, Chile. It is the main access road to the coast of Osorno Province. The road runs from Rahue to Maicolpue passing by Bahía Mansa. In 2013 a series of new road safety improvements on the road next to Rahue begun.
