= Estación Yumbel =

Town in Biobío, Chile

- Town
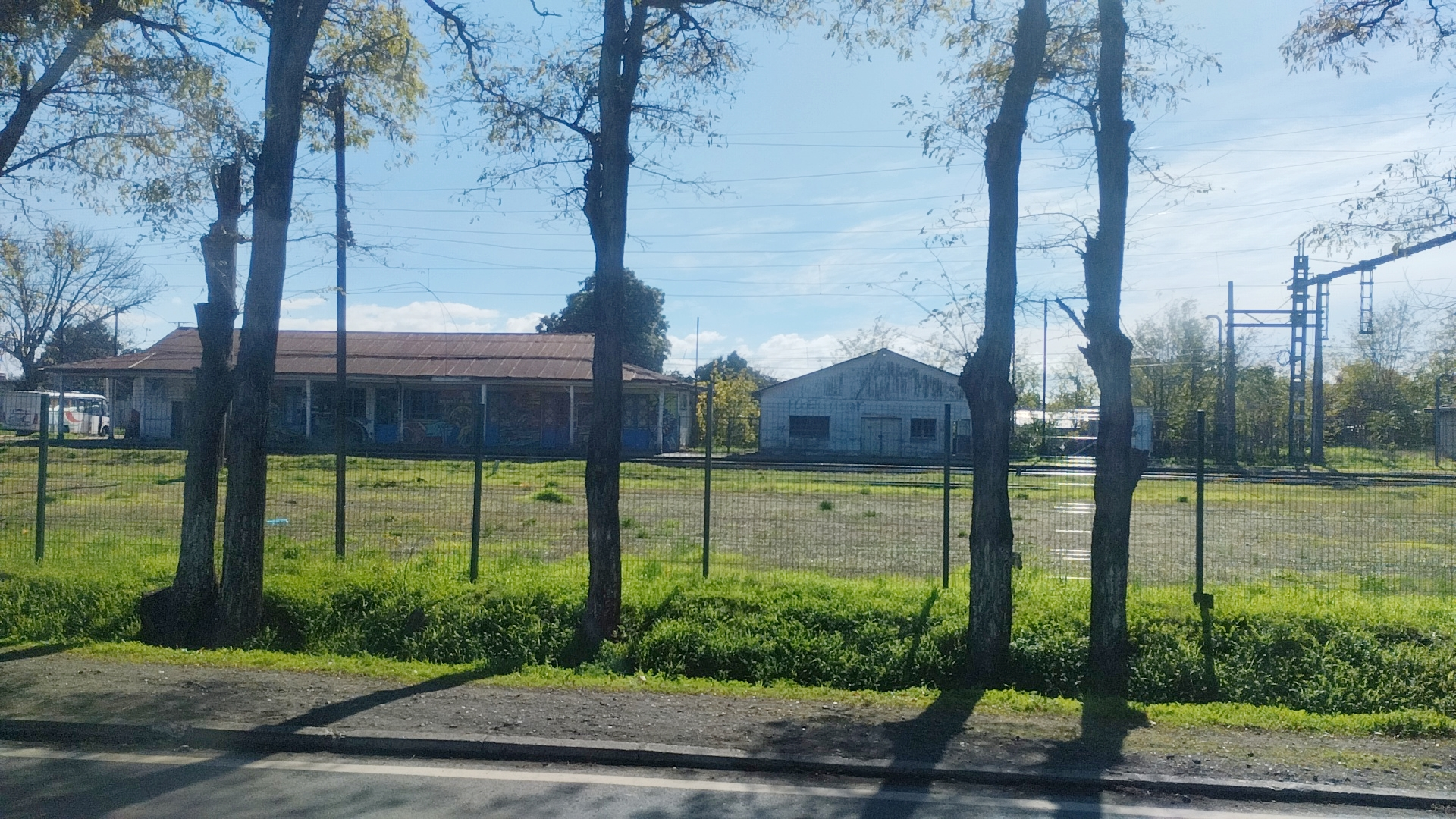
- Interactive map of Estación Yumbel
- Coordinates: 37°8′39.47″S 72°32′22.71″W
- Region: Biobío
- Province: Biobío
- Municipality: Yumbel
- Commune: Yumbel

Government
  - Type: Municipal
  - Alcalde: José Sáez Vinet
- Elevation: 102 m (335 ft)

Population (2017)
  - Total: 2,930

Sex
  - Men: 1,409
  - Women: 1,521
- Time zone: UTC−04:00 (Chilean Standard)
  - Summer (DST): UTC−03:00 (Chilean Daylight)
- Area code: Country + town = 56 + 43
- Climate: Csb

Estación Yumbel is a town (Spanish: pueblo) in Biobío Region, Chile. It belongs to the commune of Yumbel and is administered by the municipal government of that city. The town lies along the main Chilean railway line south. It lies about 5.5 kilometers south of Yumbel.

In 2002, the new Alameda-Talcahuano night service began to operate, replacing the old "Rápido del Biobío". On some occasions special services are made from Talcahuano and Estación Concepción with AEL series railcars or locomotive and car compositions, due to the celebration of the Feast of San Sebastián (January 20), and on March 20, when thanks are given for the harvests.

After the earthquake of February 27, 2010, the main structure was seriously damaged, which caused the station to be in an evident state of abandonment. In January 2018 the new AUV mobilization system came into operation which meant the definitive closure of the EFE traffic office.
