= Laguna Verde, Chile =

Town in Valparaíso, Chile

Coordinates: 33°06′S 71°41′W

Laguna Verde is a Chilean town in the commune of Valparaíso in Valparaíso Province, Valparaíso Region. It had 3,686 inhabitants reported in the 2017 census. It is a bay located at the south of the Valparaíso commune, around El Sauce estuary and the beach.

== See also ==
- List of towns in Chile
