= Cachapoal, Ñuble =

Village in Ñuble Region, Chile

Coordinates: 36°27′S 71°44′W

Cachapoal (Fertile valley in Mapudungun) is a village located in the municipality of San Carlos, in Ñuble Region, Chile.

It is located 20 km east of San Carlos and 22 km west of San Fabián on Route N-31, has 1164 inhabitants (2002).

Some descendants of the famous nineteenth-century cattle rustlers, the Pincheira brothers, live in this village. There are also some speakers of Mapudungun.

== See also ==
- List of towns in Chile
