= Santa Olga =

- Town
- Location in Chile
- Coordinates (town): 35°27′03″S 72°16′47″W
- Country: Chile
- Region: Maule
- Province: Talca

Population (2017)
  - Total: 5,000 (before fire)
- Time zone: UTC-4 (CLT)
  - Summer (DST): UTC-3 (CLST)
- Area code: +56 75

Santa Olga was a town in the Talca Province in central Chile's Maule Region.

== History ==
Santa Olga emerged in the 1960s as an illegal settlement.

In April 2016, 60 families regularized their situation, being granted titles of dominion over their homes.

=== 2017 fire ===
On January 27, 2017, the town was destroyed by the worst wildfire in Chile's modern history. At least 1,000 homes were destroyed in the blaze. International help arrived from Russia and help was offered from both the United States and Canada. Russia sent a Supertanker Aircraft carrying tons of water. Ten people have been found dead including five firefighters, two policemen and three residents. About 5000 residents have been displaced but are unharmed.
