= Los Lleuques =

- Town
- Location in Chile
- Coordinates: 36°51′17″S 71°38′39″W
- Country: Chile
- Region: Ñuble
- Province: Diguillín
- Elevation: 890 m (2,920 ft)
- Time zone: UTC-4
  - Summer (DST): CLST
- Website: https://loslleuques.cl/

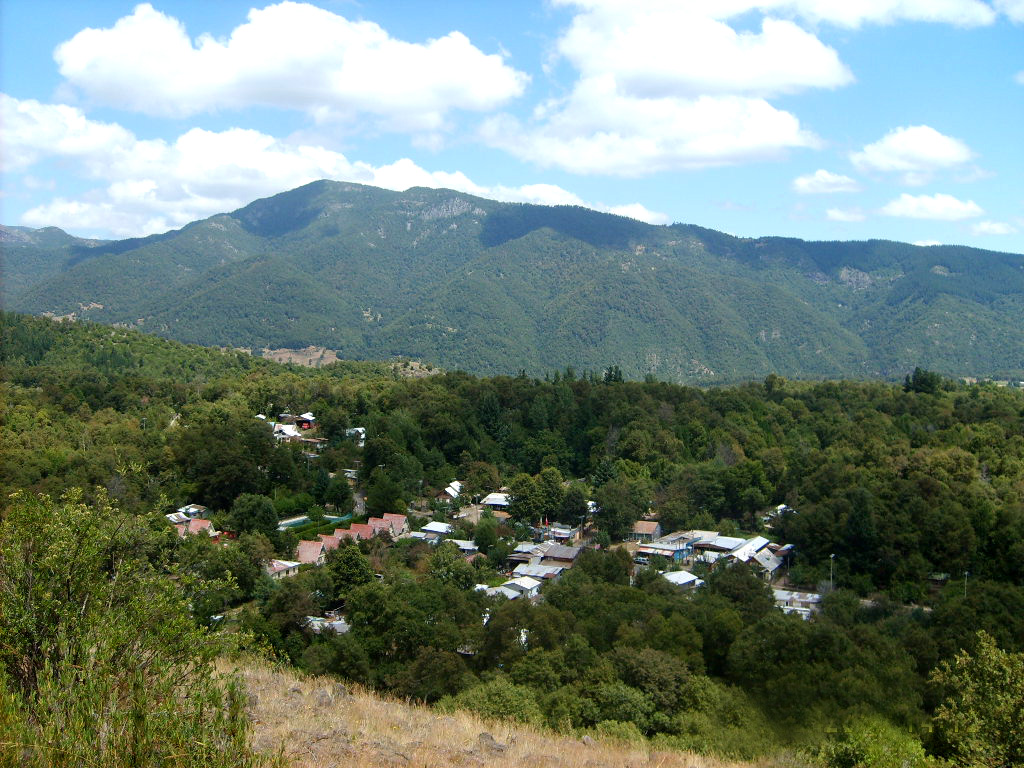
Los Lleuques as seen from nearby hills.

Los Lleuques is a town located in the Andean foothills of Chile that is part of the commune of Pinto, Diguillín Province, Ñuble Region. It is located 54 km (34 mi) away from the city of Chillán by Ruta N-55, which joins it with Termas de Chillan. Los Lleuques forms a conurbation with the nearby town of Recinto in the Las Trancas Valley. The combined population of the Recinto-Los Lleuques area is 1,607 people, with a total area of 4.53 km² (1.75 mi²).

== History ==
In the mid-1950s the town became a popular summer vacation spot for residents of the Ñuble province, while also being a stop for travelers on their way to Termas de Chillan, a popular location for skiing and hot springs. The town gets its name from an abundance of Lleuque trees. Its climate is temperate warm with a short dry season (less than 4 months). It is nestled within the hills of a native forest area, with species such as the Chilean bellflower, Chilean hazelnut, boldo, and plum pine. The town is bordered by the Renegado River, at its East and South by the Digullín River, both of which convulse in a waterfall known as Salto del Renegado, or Jump of the Renegade, which is more than 40m high.

== Attractions ==
Every February Lleuque week takes place, an event with various competitions and a queen of the festival crowned at its close. Each spring a cultural fair takes place, known as the Fiesta de la Avellana, where vendors sell products made of the Chilean Hazelnut. The town is also popular among mountain bikers and hikers, with access to Ñuble National Reserve.
