= Queule =

- Town
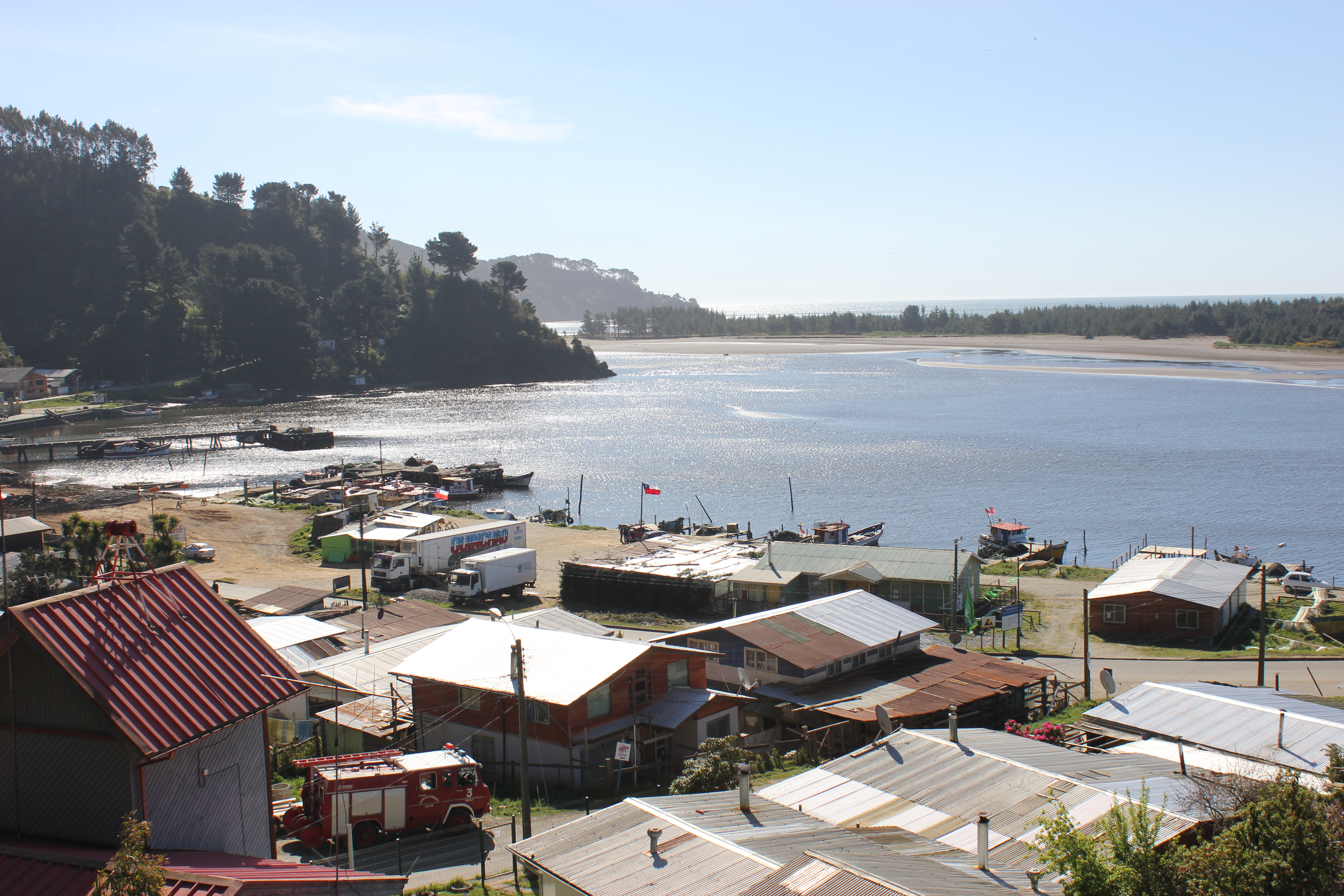
- Queule as seen in November 2013

- Location in Chile
- Coordinates: 39°23′S 73°14′W
- Country: Chile
- Admin. division: Araucanía Region
- Province: Cautín Province
- Commune: Toltén

Population (2002 )
  - Total: 1,422

Queule is a Chilean town in the commune of Toltén in Cautín Province, Araucanía Region. It is located just north of Mehuín and close to the border of Araucanía Region with Los Ríos Region.

Days after the 1960 Valdivia earthquake and tsunami a police officer stationed in Queule reported hundreds of people from Quele to be dead or missing. Historians Yoselin Jaramillo and Ismael Basso report that people in Queule decades later know about 50 people to have died because of the earthquake and tsunami.

== See also ==
- List of towns in Chile
