= Mininco Formation =

Geological formation in Chile

- Stratigraphic range: Pliocene
- Type: Geological formation
- Underlies: Quaternary sediments
- Overlies: Huelehueico Formation
- Thickness: up to 300 m (980 ft)

Lithology
- Primary: Conglomerate, and siltstone, sandstone, claystone
- Other: Tuff, coal

Location
- Coordinates: 37.8°S 72.7°W
- Region: Bío Bío & Araucanía Regions
- Country: Chile

Type section
- Named for: Mininco River
- Mininco Formation (Chile)

Mininco Formation (Spanish: Formación Mininco) is a geological formation composed of sediments that deposited during the Pliocene in central Chile. Near Angol the formation reaches thicknesses of up to 300 m. The upper strata of the formation contain tuff layers and coal beds that are rich in leaf fossils. Other fossils that have been found in the formation include fresh-water diatoms and bivalves.
