= Mininco River =

Location
- Country: Chile

The Mininco River is a river of Chile.

== See also ==
- Mininco Formation
- List of rivers of Chile
