= Mehuín =

- Town
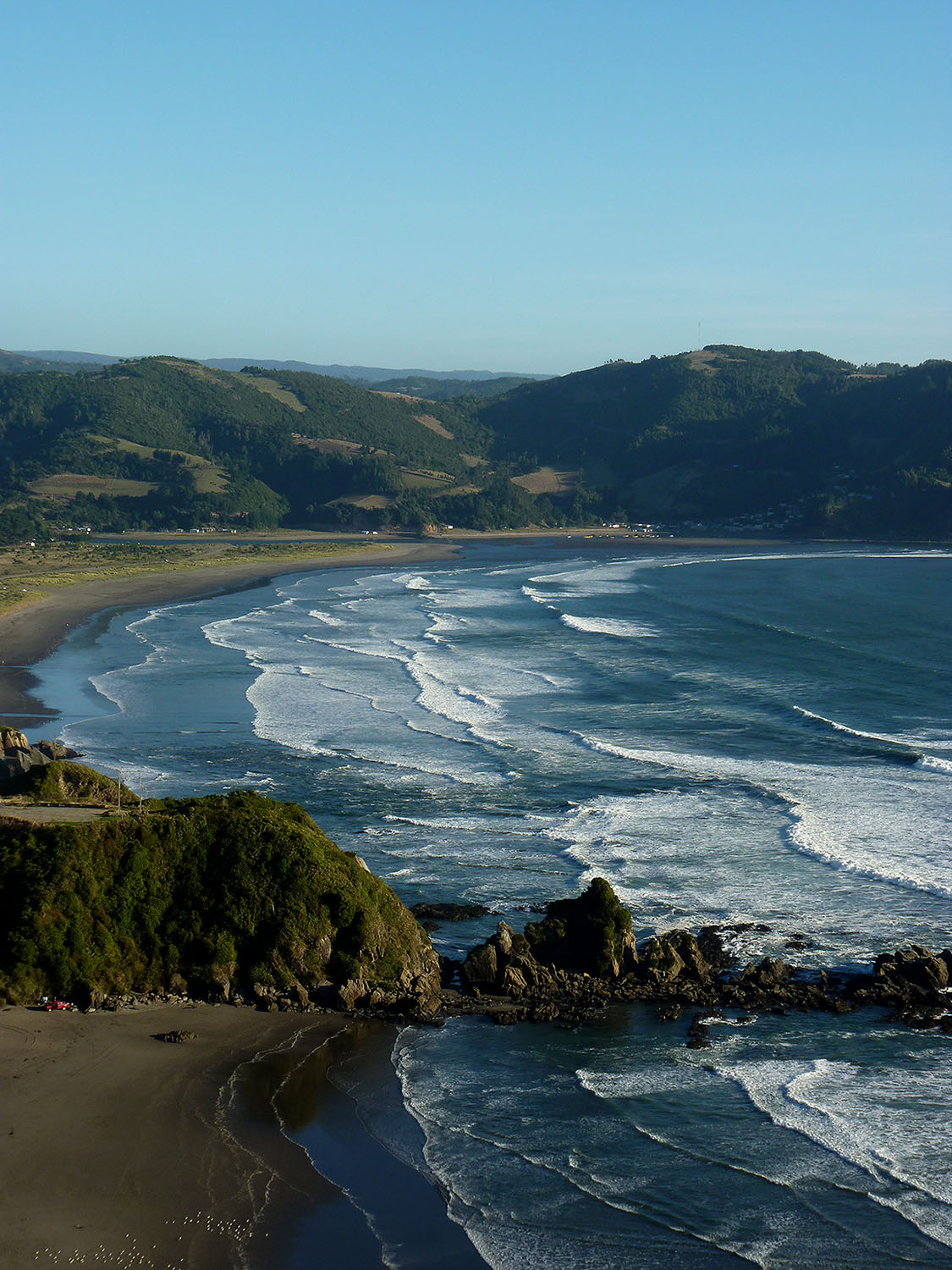
- Southward view of the beach of Mehuín

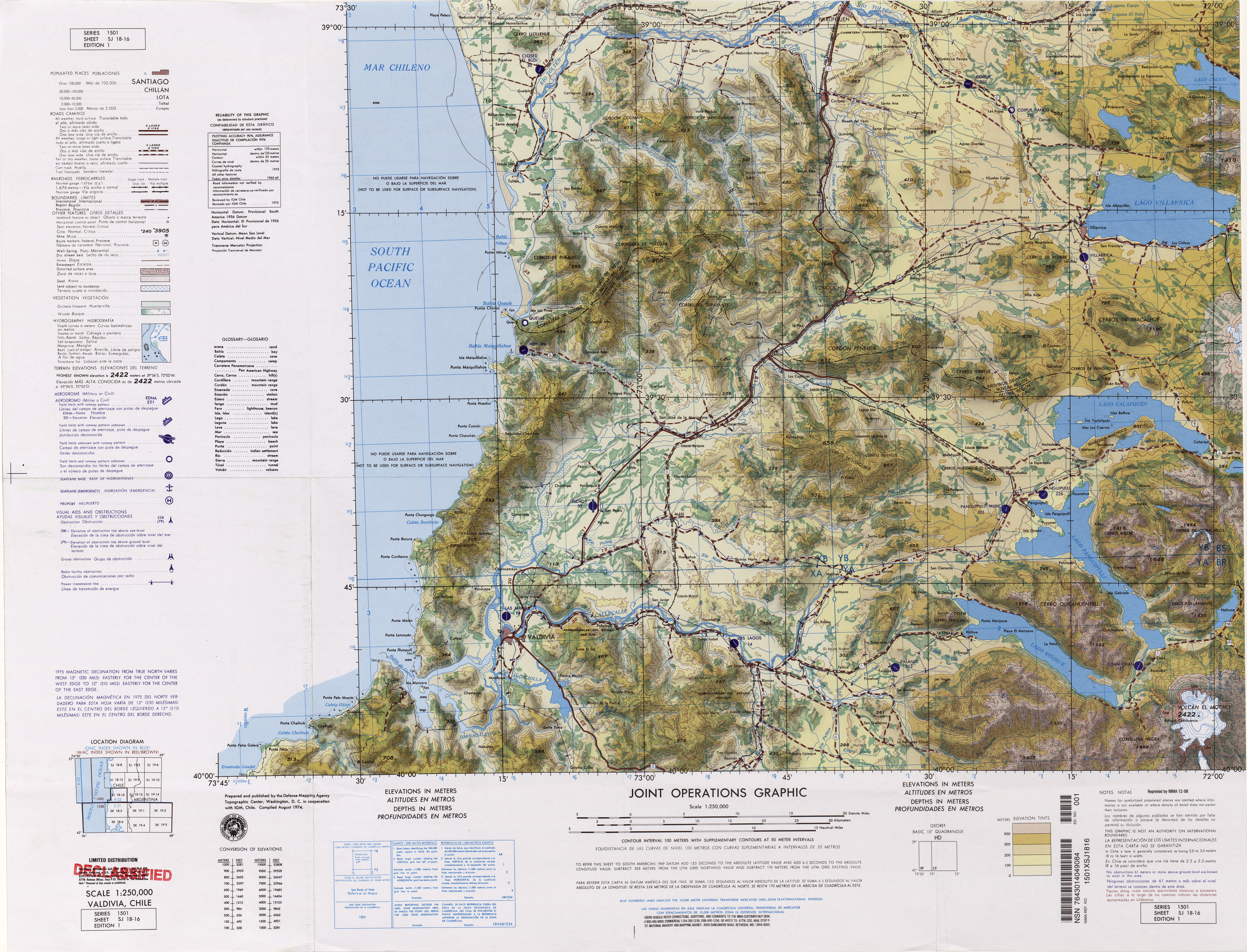
- Mehuín, in the middle of the coast shown in map

- Location in Chile
- Coordinates (town): 39°26′34″S 73°12′41″W
- Region: Los Ríos
- Province: Valdivia
- Commune: San José de la Mariquina

Government
  - Type: Municipality
  - Alcade: Erwin Pacheco Ayala

Population (2002 census )
  - Total: 1,135
- Time zone: UTC−04:00 (CLT)
  - Summer (DST): UTC−03:00 (CLST)
- Area code: Country + town = 56 + ?

Mehuín is a Chilean town and harbour, located on the shores of the Pacific Ocean at the mouth of Lingue River. Administratively it belongs to the San José de la Mariquina commune in Valdivia Province of Los Ríos Region. The town is located a few kilometers south of the town of Queule and very close to the border between Los Ríos Region and Araucanía Region.
