= La Huayca =

Town in Chile, Tarapacá Region

Coordinates: 20°25′54″S 69°33′37″W

- La Huayca
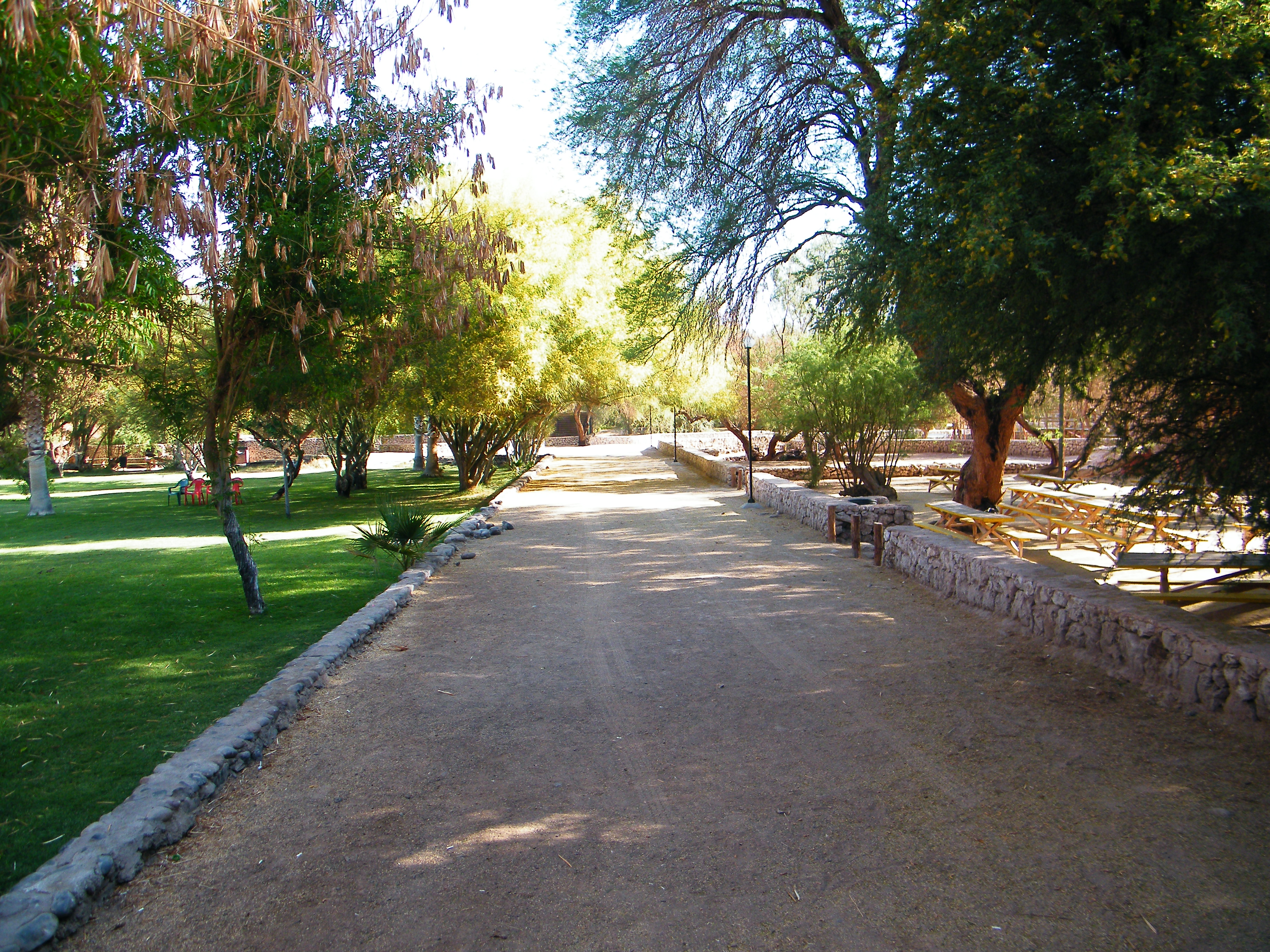

- Country: Chile
- Region: Tarapacá
- Province: El Tamarugal

La Huayca (in Aymara : wayk'a, place of chili pepper') is a Chilean town. It is a town that is located 27 km from Pica, 16 km from La Tirana, 34 km from Pozo Almonte and 87 km from Iquique, in the Tarapacá Region Commune of Pozo Almonte, Chile.

== Geography ==
It is a small town foundedaround 1850; built in stone, with a long street of lined houses and a plaza of old trees. La Huayca is an agricultural landscape in the middle of a desert. It was an area of large forests during the Colony. Around 1720, mining plants for the benefit of silver-bitron started which initiated the felling of the forest for firewood. A large population settled to work in alfalfa fields, in canchones for food and fattening of thousands of pack mules used in the nitrate works.
