= Hornitos, Chile =

Coastal town and beach resort in Chile

Coordinates: 22°54′S 70°17′W

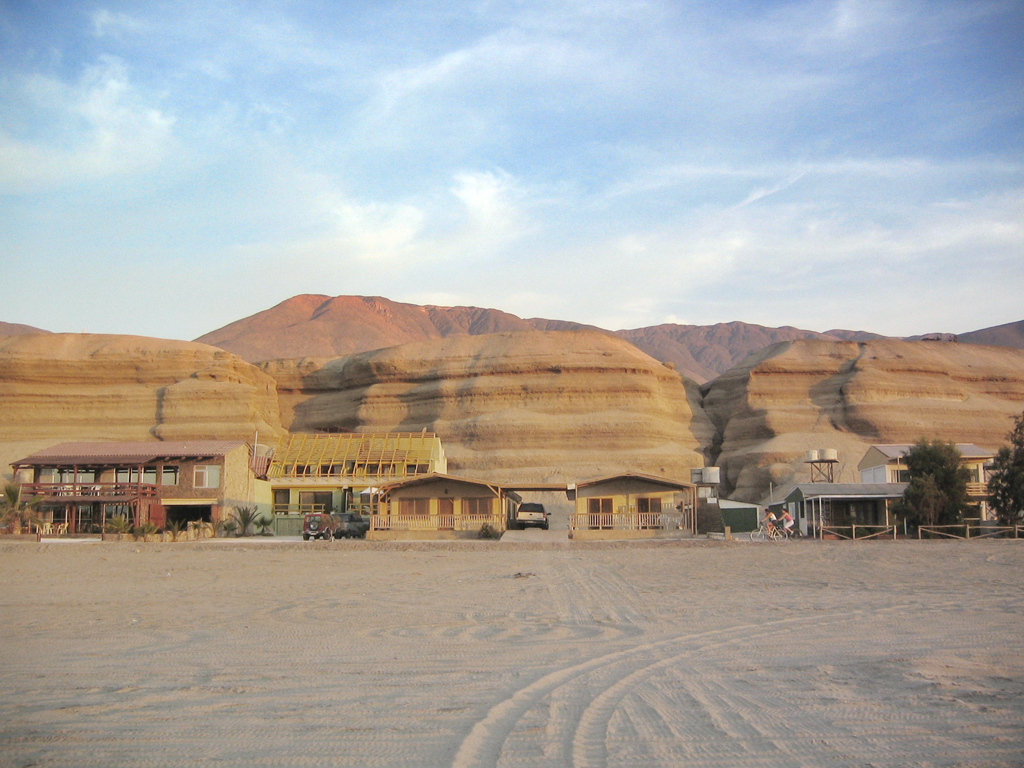
Hornitos beach and town

Hornitos is a coastal town and beach resort located in the Mejillones commune of Chile's Antofagasta Region. It is situated approximately 32 km (20 mi) north of Mejillones, 90 km (56 mi) north of Antofagasta, and 102 km (63 mi) south of Tocopilla. Population: 63 (2002 census).

== Overview ==
Hornitos is primarily a vacation town, consisting of nearly 300 houses that are mostly occupied during the summer months by residents of Antofagasta; few remain inhabited in winter. According to the 2002 census, it had a permanent population of 63.

The resort is noted for its fine sand, pleasant climate, scenic landscapes, and striking coastal cliffs. Its temperate waters and moderate waves make it suitable for swimming. Situated among rocky seaside cliffs, Hornitos has a desert climate with stable coastal temperatures, averaging a maximum of 24.5 °C (76.1 °F) and a minimum of 17.1 °C (62.8 °F). Rainfall is almost nonexistent, averaging about 3 mm annually, although coastal cloudiness is frequent.

The beach is popular for picnics and shoreline walks. A single street runs along its length, from the southern to the northern entrance, and is suitable for cycling and jogging. These features make Hornitos one of the main tourist destinations in Chile's Norte Grande region.

Despite its popularity, Hornitos lacks basic public services such as a connection to the national power grid and a potable water supply. Homes without electrical connections rely on generators or photovoltaic panels. The beach is not served by public transportation, and access is primarily by private vehicle.

== See also ==
- List of towns in Chile
