= La Compañía (Chile) =

Town in Chile

Coordinates: 34.0801°S 70.6824°W

La Compañía is a Chilean town in the communes of Graneros in Cachapoal Province, O'Higgins Region.

== See also ==
- List of towns in Chile
