= Mininco =

- Town
- Interactive map of Mininco
- Coordinates: 37°47′24.03″S 72°28′39.17″W
- Region: Araucanía
- Province: Malleco
- Municipality: Collipulli
- Commune: Collipulli

Government
  - Type: Municipal
  - Alcalde: Manuel Macaya Ramírez (independent)
- Elevation: 194 m (636 ft)

Population (2017)
  - Total: 2,005

Sex
  - Men: 1016
  - Women: 989
- Time zone: UTC−04:00 (Chilean Standard)
  - Summer (DST): UTC−03:00 (Chilean Daylight)
- Area code: Country + town = 56 + 45
- Climate: Cfb

Mininco is a town (Spanish: pueblo) in northernmost Araucanía Region, southern Chile. It belongs to the commune of Collipulli and is administered by the municipal government of Renaico. It lies along a road between the town of Tijeral and Chile Route 5.
