= Los Quinquelles =

Los Quinquelles Polcura Santa Helena de los Quinquelles de Polcura
- Town
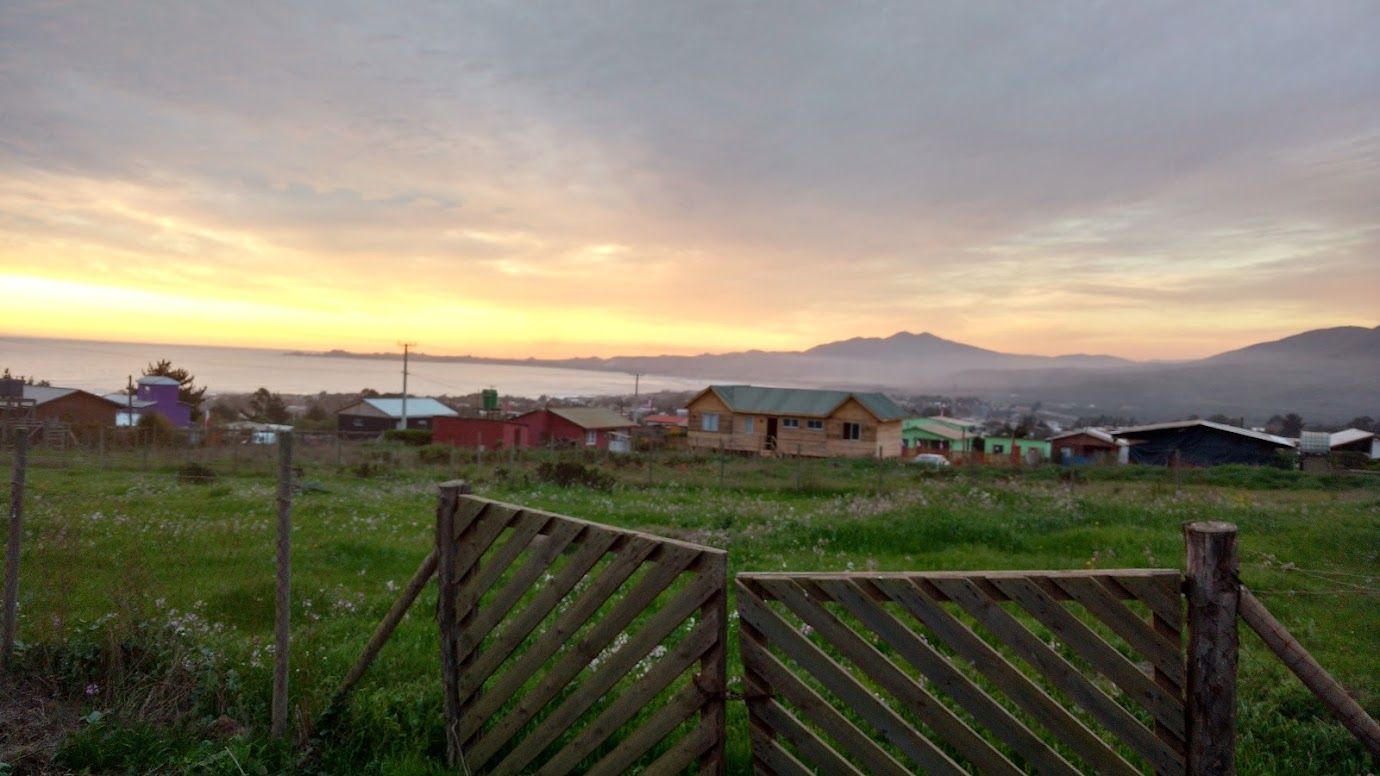

- Location in Chile
- Coordinates (city): 32°17′44″S 71°28′03″W
- Country: Chile
- Region: Valparaíso
- Province: Petorca
- Elevation: 50 m (160 ft)
- Demonym: quinquellino (a)
- Time zone: UTC−4 (CLT)
  - Summer (DST): UTC−3 (CLST)
- Area code: +56

Los Quinquelles (formerly known as Polcura) is a rural Chilean locality that belongs to the commune of La Ligua, Petorca Province, Valparaíso Region which is located a few kilometers from Los Molles. It is connected to the rest of the country through the Pan-American Highway, the town is located at kilometer 178 of Route 5 North.

This locality is known for having mostly summer houses and their owners are mainly from outside the town.

Drinking water is distributed through water trucks as the hydraulic system is disabled due to the water crisis in the Petorca River basin. There is a desalination plant in the locality for the exclusive use of permanent residents.

The nearest Carabineros police station is located in Los Molles.

It is bordered to the north by the town of La Ballena on the El Arrayán ravine.

In the Las Terrazas sector, it is located the Nuestra Señora de los Rayos chapel.

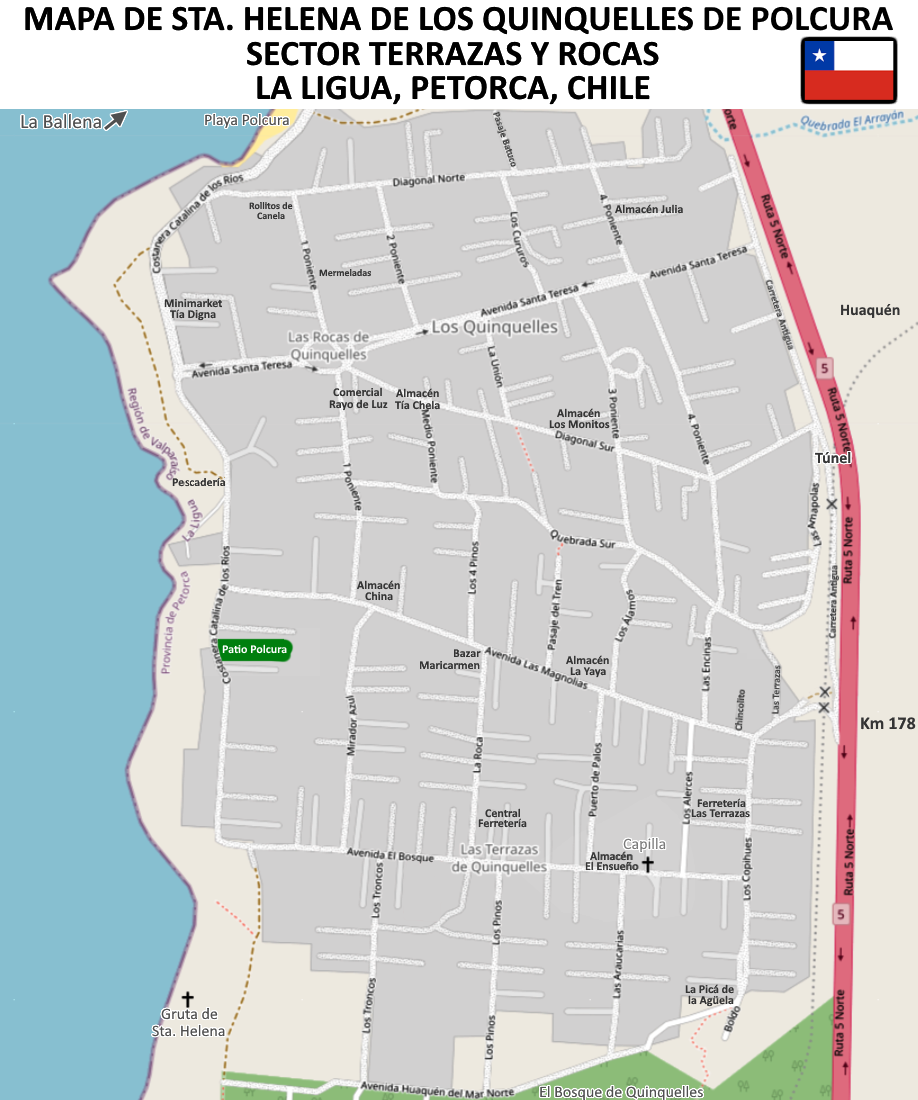
Map of Santa Helena de Los Quinquelles de Polcura, La Ligua, Petorca, Chile.

== Flora ==
Throughout the sector you can find several native species of cactus, especially coastal cactus.

== Sectors ==
The town of Los Quinquelles is divided into several sectors:

- Quinquelles Beach or Caleta Cove.
- Rocks of Quinquelles
- Quinquelles Terraces
- Quinquelles Forest or Paradise of Quinquelles
- Huaquén of the Sea

== History ==
During the pre-Columbian period the area was frequented by nomadic Indians of the Huentelauquén culture and later by Picunches.

After the conquest of Chile, during the Hispanic period, the place becomes the property of Catalina de los Ríos y Lisperguer, also known as "La Quintrala".

After the independence, already in the republican period it becomes part of the Huaquén hacienda and wheat is planted, besides goats and some lambs were brought.

Subsequently, plots of land began to be sold and what is now known as Los Quinquelles, formerly known as "Polcura" (a Mapudungun word meaning "yellow stone"), began to form in the area south of La Ballena (a locality commonly confused with Quinquelles).

During the 21st century the population density of the place increases, especially since the 2010s creating a neighborhood council in the sector of Las Rocas and another one in Las Terrazas. In 2021 the "brigada ecológica Los Quinquelles" was founded with legal personality.

Previously the town was supplied with drinking water through pipes, for various reasons the water became scarce, so currently the town depends on water trucks.

== Gallery ==
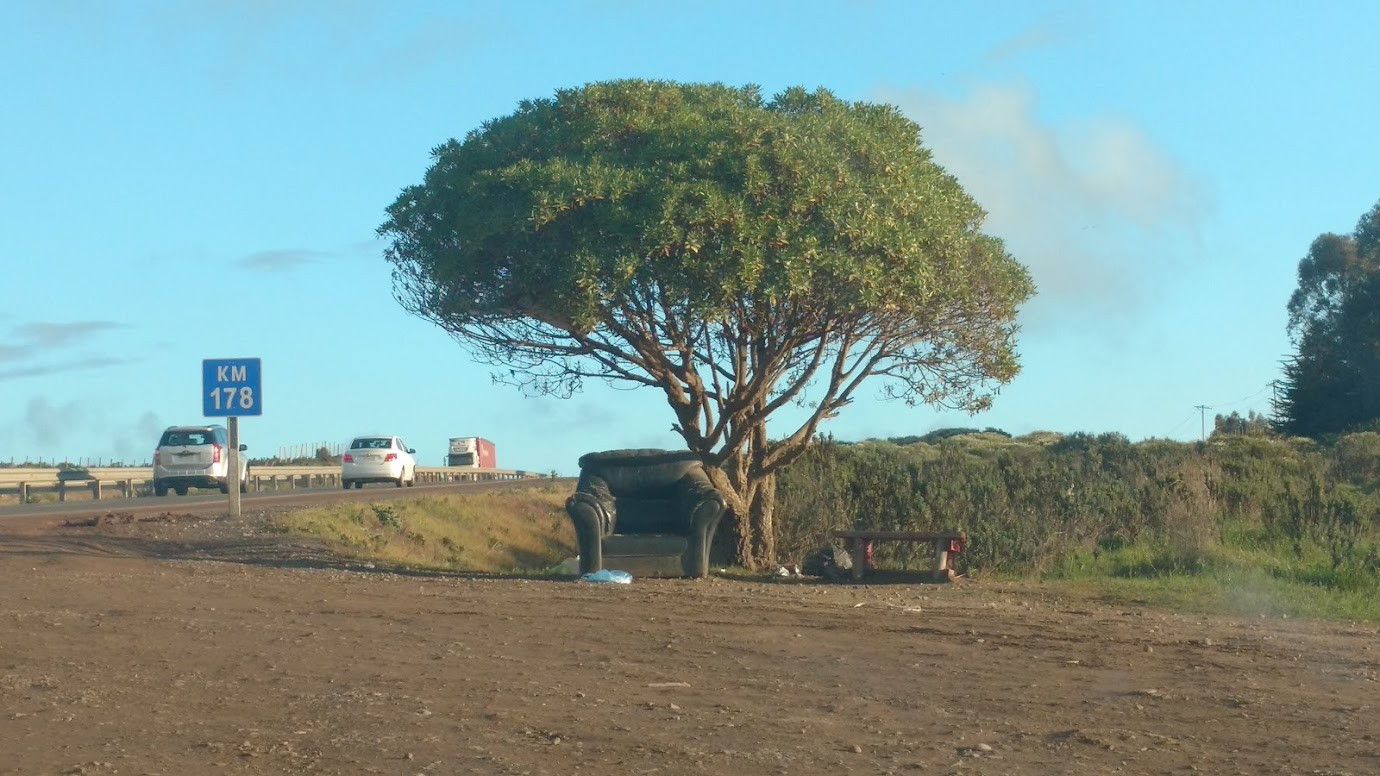
Exit from Los Quinquelles along Route 5, kilometer 178.

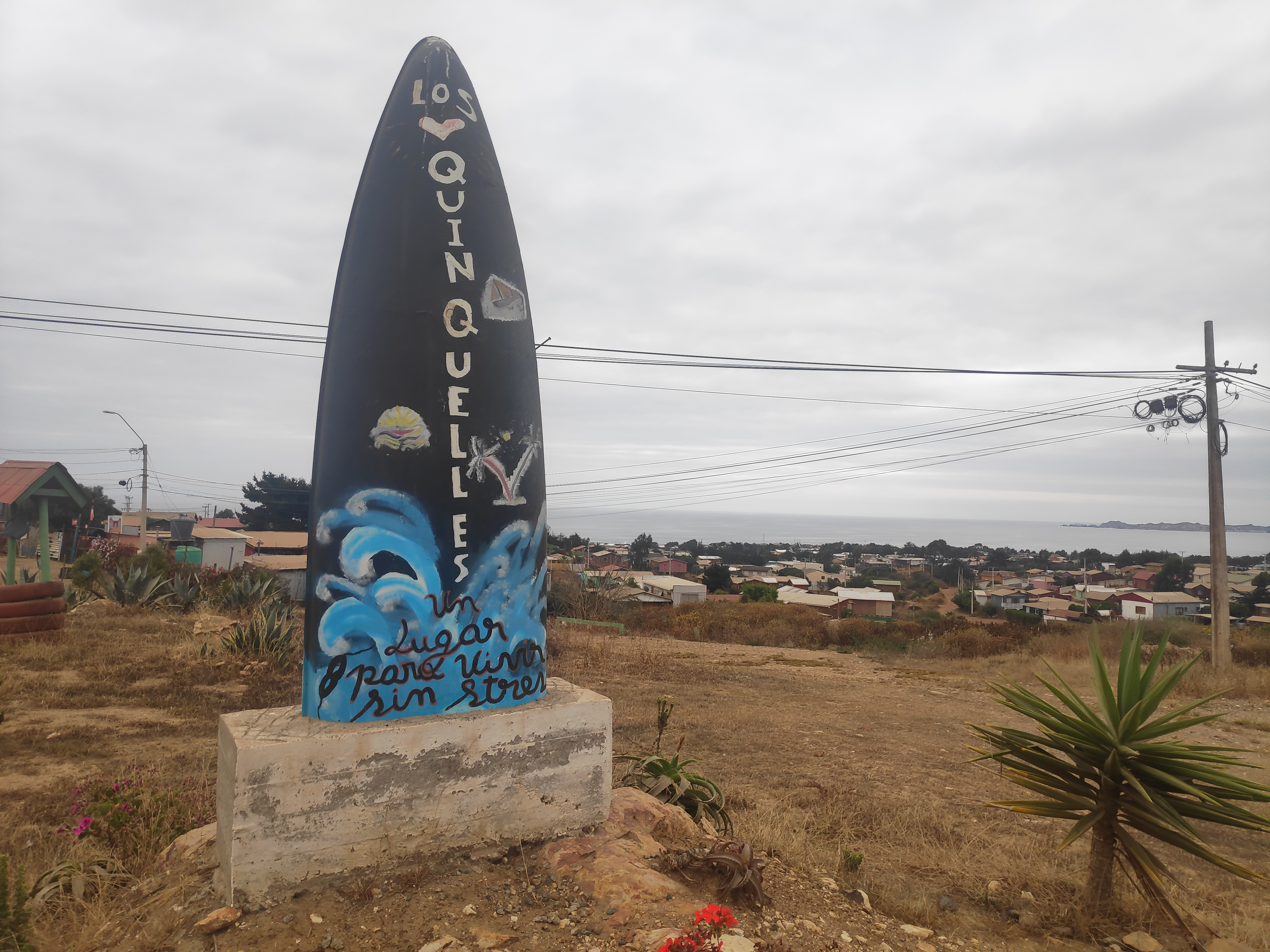
Los Quinquelles Entrance.

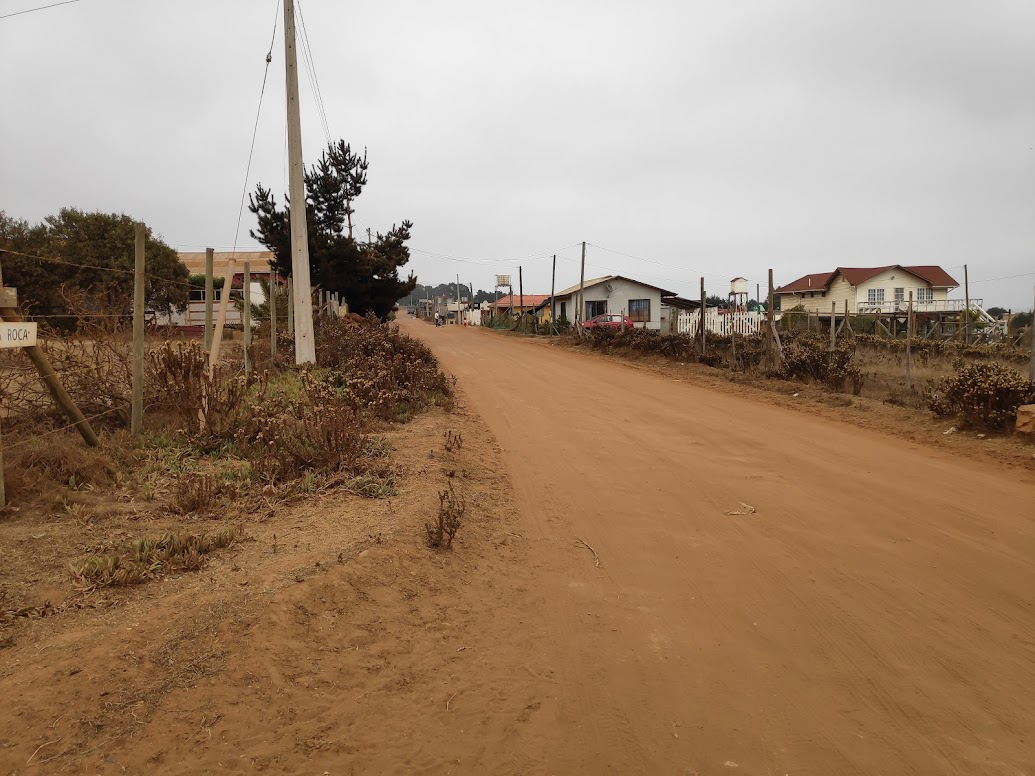
La Roca Road, in the sector of Las Terrazas de Los Quinquelles.

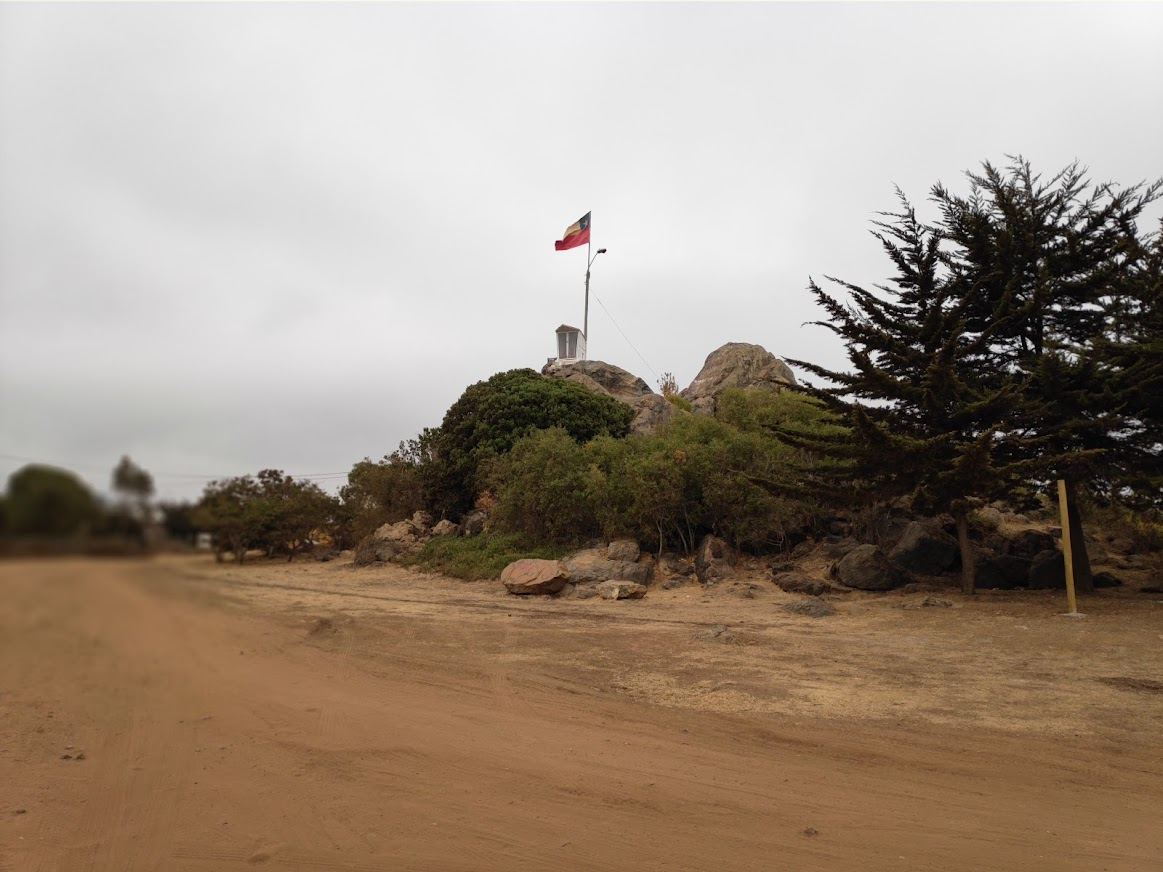
Las Rocas de Quinquelles sector, Santa Teresa Avenue.

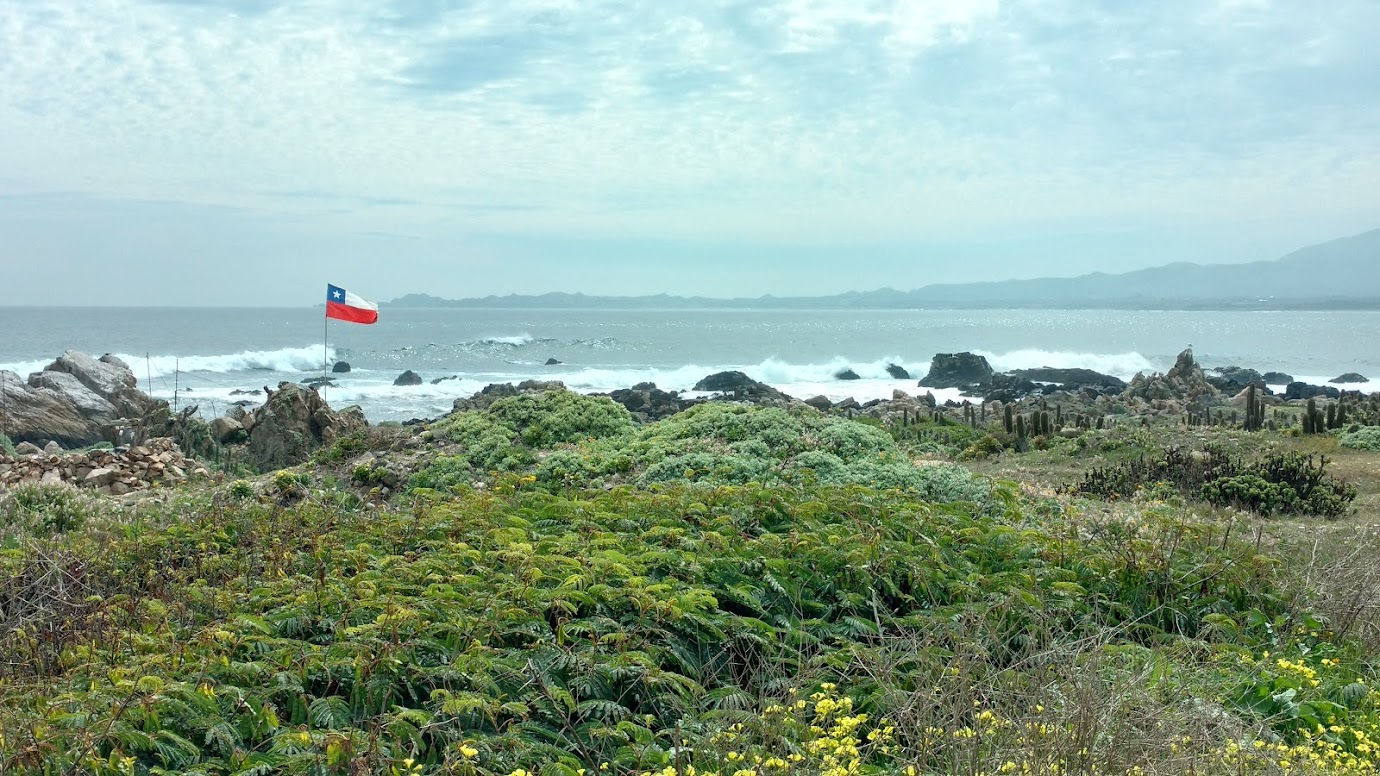
Nature of Los Quinquelles.

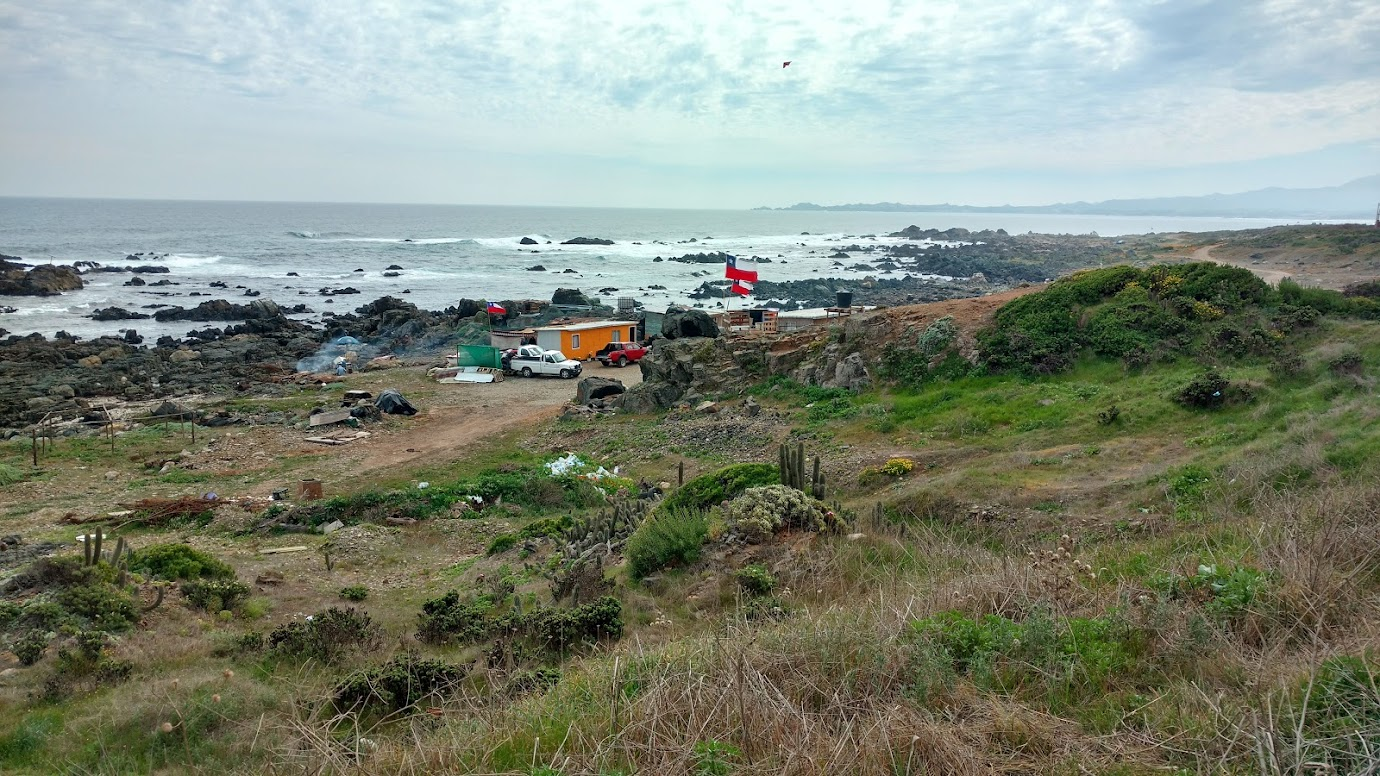
Nature of Los Quinquelles

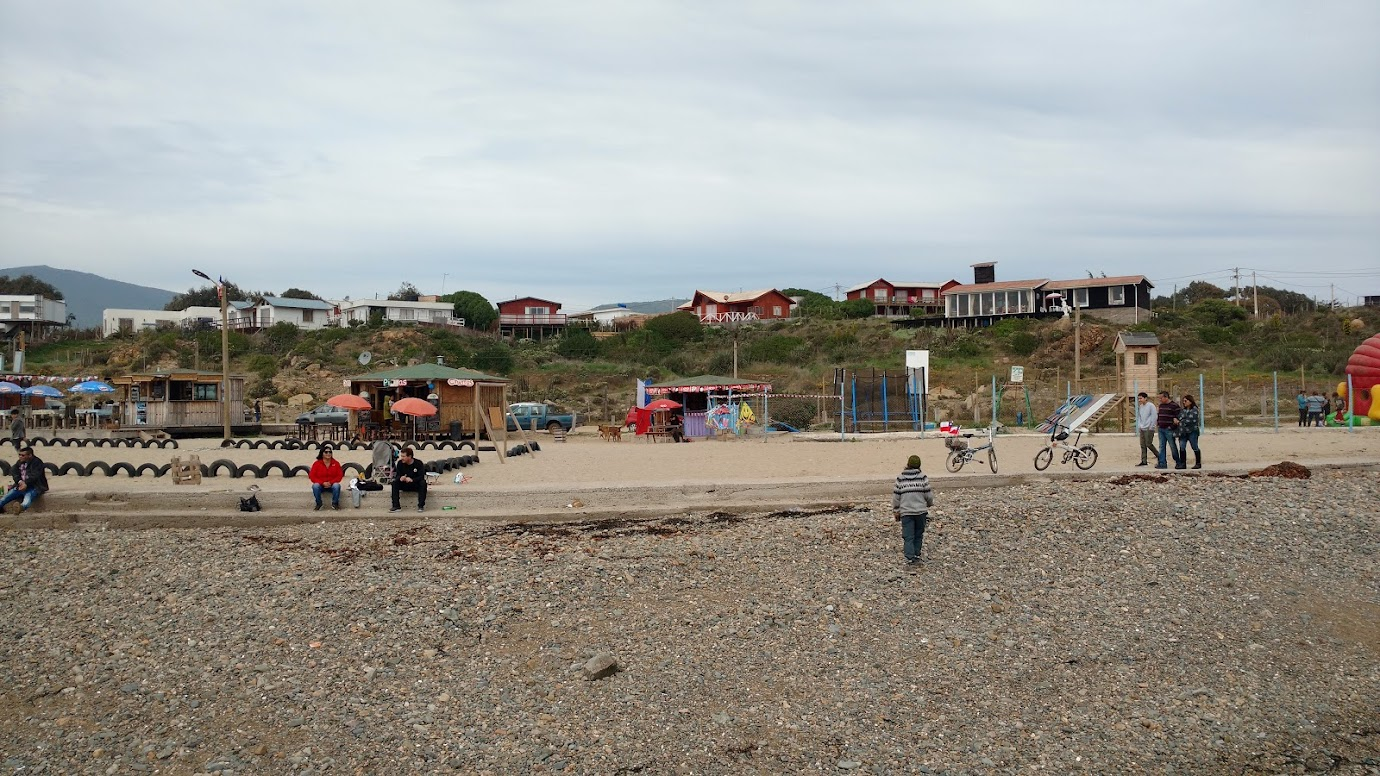
Los Quinquelles beach

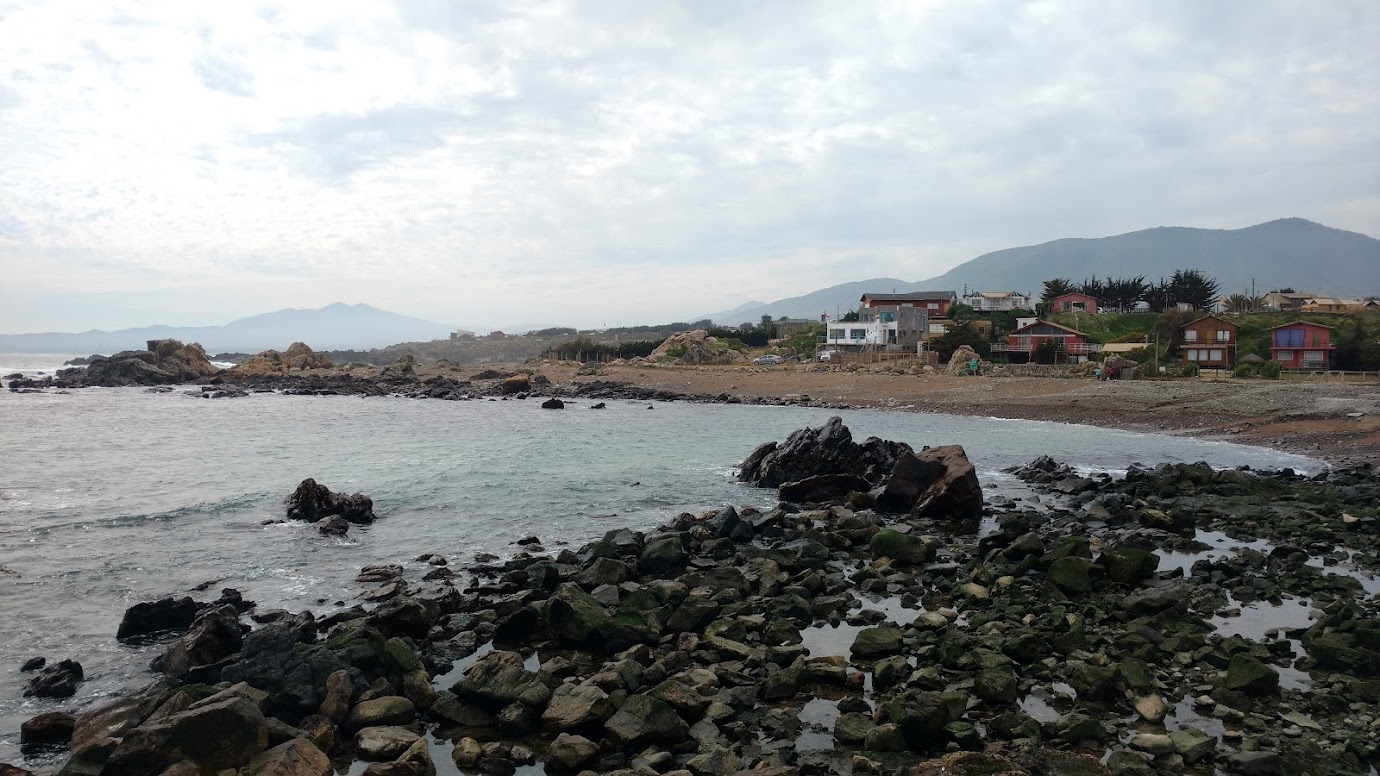
Los Quinquelles Cove

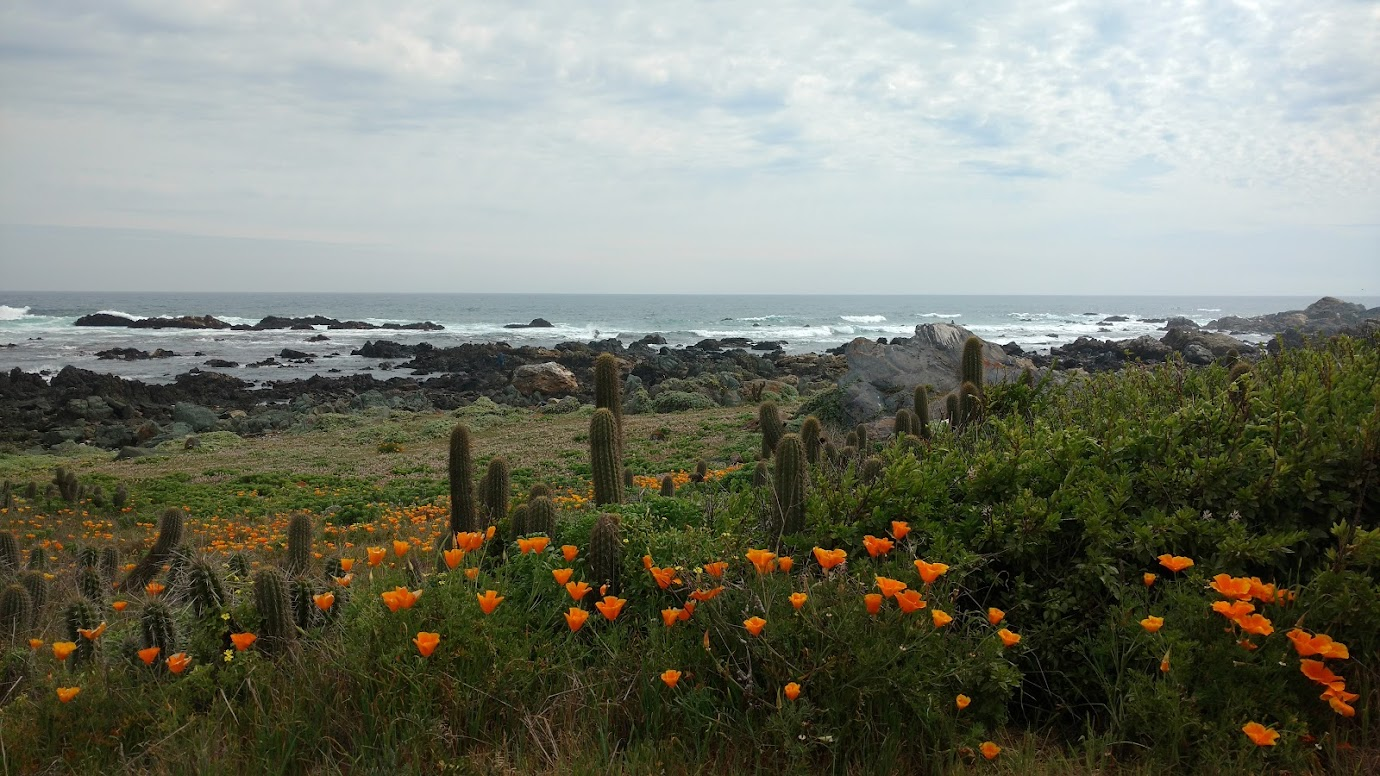
Nature of Los Quinquelles

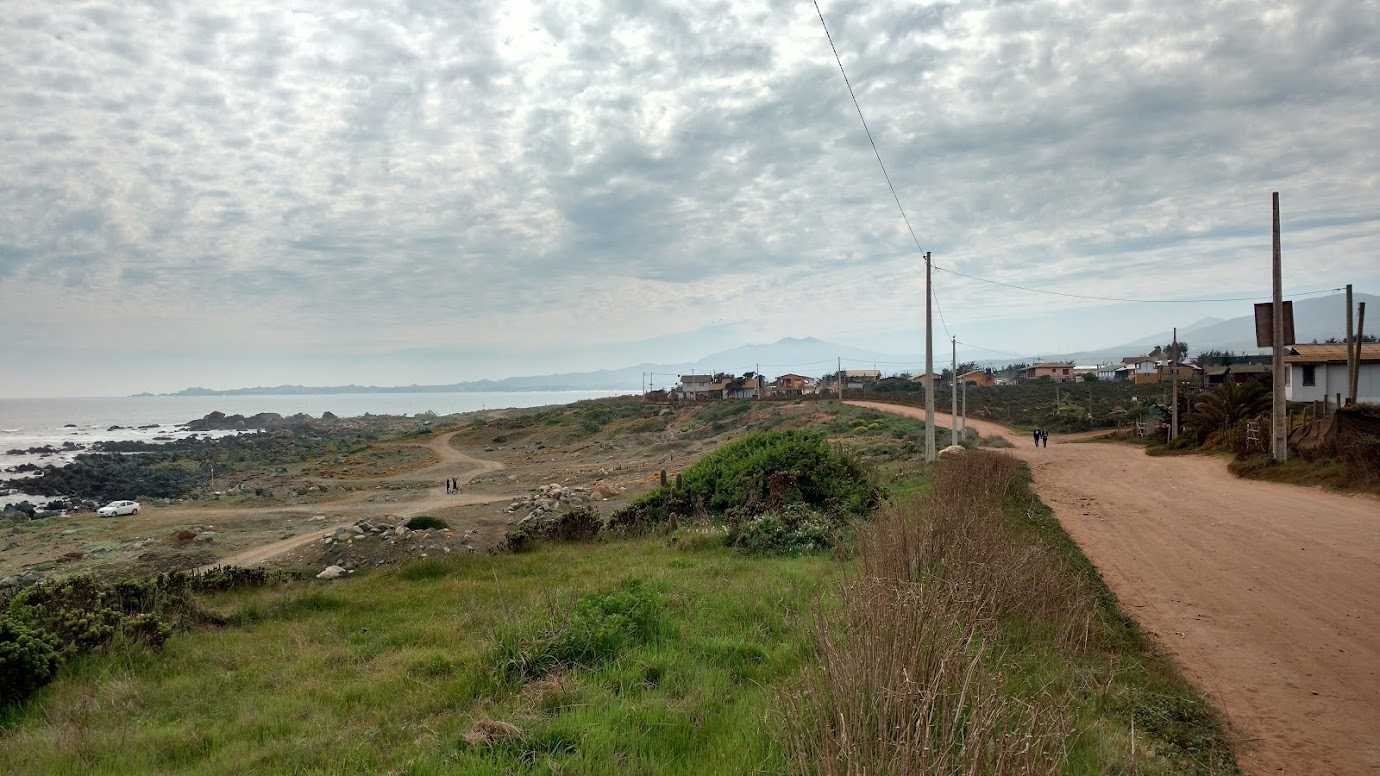
Nature of Los Quinquelles
