= Tinguiririca, Chile =

Town in Colchagua, Chile

Coordinates: 34°39′S 70°59′W

Tinguiririca is a Chilean town in the commune of Chimbarongo in Colchagua Province, O'Higgins Region.

== See also ==
- List of towns in Chile
