= Church of La Compañía =

Church of La Compañía may refer to:

- Church of La Compañía, Arequipa, Peru
- Church of La Compañía, Puebla, Mexico
- Church of La Compañía, Quito, Ecuador
