= Los Pellines, Los Ríos Region =

Coordinates: 39°45′51.97″S 73°22′19.30″W

Los Pellines is a sparsely populated rural area near the coast of Valdivia, southern Chile. The area is known for its beautiful views but faces a scarcity of water. Since 2017 Los Pellines have seen an upsurge of real estate enterprises seeking to sell plots of land for buyers interested in building country houses.
