= Huellelhue River =

- Native name: Río Huellelhue (Spanish)

Location
- Country: Chile

Physical characteristics
- Source
  - location: Coast Range
- Mouth
  - location: Pacific Ocean, Chile
  - coordinates: 40°41′51″S 73°48′29″W
  - elevation: 0 m (0 ft)

Huellelhue River, also spelled Hueyelhue, is a river in the Los Lagos Region of Chile. It has a length of 51 kilometres (32 mi).
