= Ramadillas =

Coordinates: 28°07′S 69°45′W

Ramadillas is a small town located off of route P-160 in the Region of Bio Bio, Chile. It is part of the Municipality of Arauco. The nearest town is Carampangue.
