= Corte Alto =

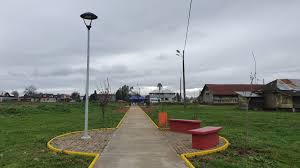
- Corte Alto
- Interactive map of Corte Alto
- Coordinates: 40°57′6.23″S 73°9′30.08″W
- Region: Los Lagos
- Province: Osorno
- Municipalidad: Purranque
- Comuna: Purranque

Government
  - Type: Municipalidad
  - Alcalde: César Crot Vargas
- Elevation: 138 m (453 ft)

Population (2017 census)
  - Total: 1,774
- Time zone: UTC−04:00 (Chilean Standard)
  - Summer (DST): UTC−03:00 (Chilean Daylight)
- Area code: Country + town = 56 + 64

Corte Alto is a town (Spanish: pueblo) south of the city of Purranque in Osorno Province, south-central Chile. It lies about 1 km west of the Chile Route 5. The town had 1,774 inhabitants as of 2017.
