= Carampangue =

Town of Chile

Coordinates: 37°15′S 73°14′W

Carampangue is a small town in Biobío Region, Chile. It is approximately 50 kilometers south of the regional capital, Concepción, and borders the towns of Arauco and Ramadillas.

== See also ==
- List of towns in Chile
