= Los Pellines, Los Lagos Region =

Coordinates: 41°11′35.39″S 73°3′59.58″W

Los Pellines
- Interactive map of Los Pellines
- Region: Los Lagos
- Province: Llanquihue
- Municipality: Llanquihue
- Commune: Llanquihue

Government
  - Type: Municipality
  - Alcalde: Victor Angulo Muñoz (Ind.)

Population (2017)
  - Total: 1,159

Sex
  - Men: 569
  - Women: 590
- Time zone: UTC-4 (Chilean Standard)
  - Summer (DST): UTC-3 (Chilean Daylight)
- Area code: Country + town = 56 + 65

Los Pellines is a small town (Spanish: pueblo) in Los Lagos Region, Chile. It lies along Chile Route 5 south of Frutillar and north of Llanquihue about 3.5 km west of Llanquihue Lake.
