= Maicolpue =

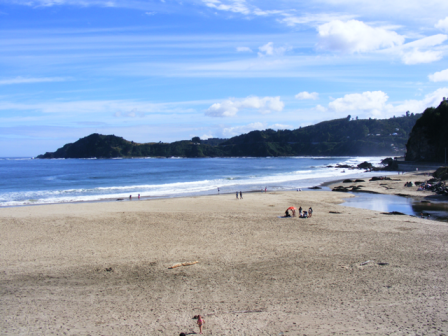
- Section of the beach in the settlement
- Interactive map of Maicolpue
- Coordinates: 40°36′18″S 73°44′38″W
- Region: Los Lagos
- Province: Osorno
- Municipality: San Juan de la Costa
- Commune: San Juan de la Costa

Government
  - Type: Municipal
  - Alcade: Bernardo Candia Henríquez (DC)
- Elevation: 10 m (33 ft)

Population (2002)
  - Total: 902 (including Bahía Mansa)
- Time zone: UTC−04:00 (Chilean Standard)
  - Summer (DST): UTC−03:00 (Chilean Daylight)
- Area code: Country + town = 56 + 64
- Climate: Cfb

Maicolpue or Maicolpué is a settlement and beach located on the coast of Osorno Province, southern Chile. Its economy revolves around tourism subsistence farming and logging.
