= Bahía Mansa =

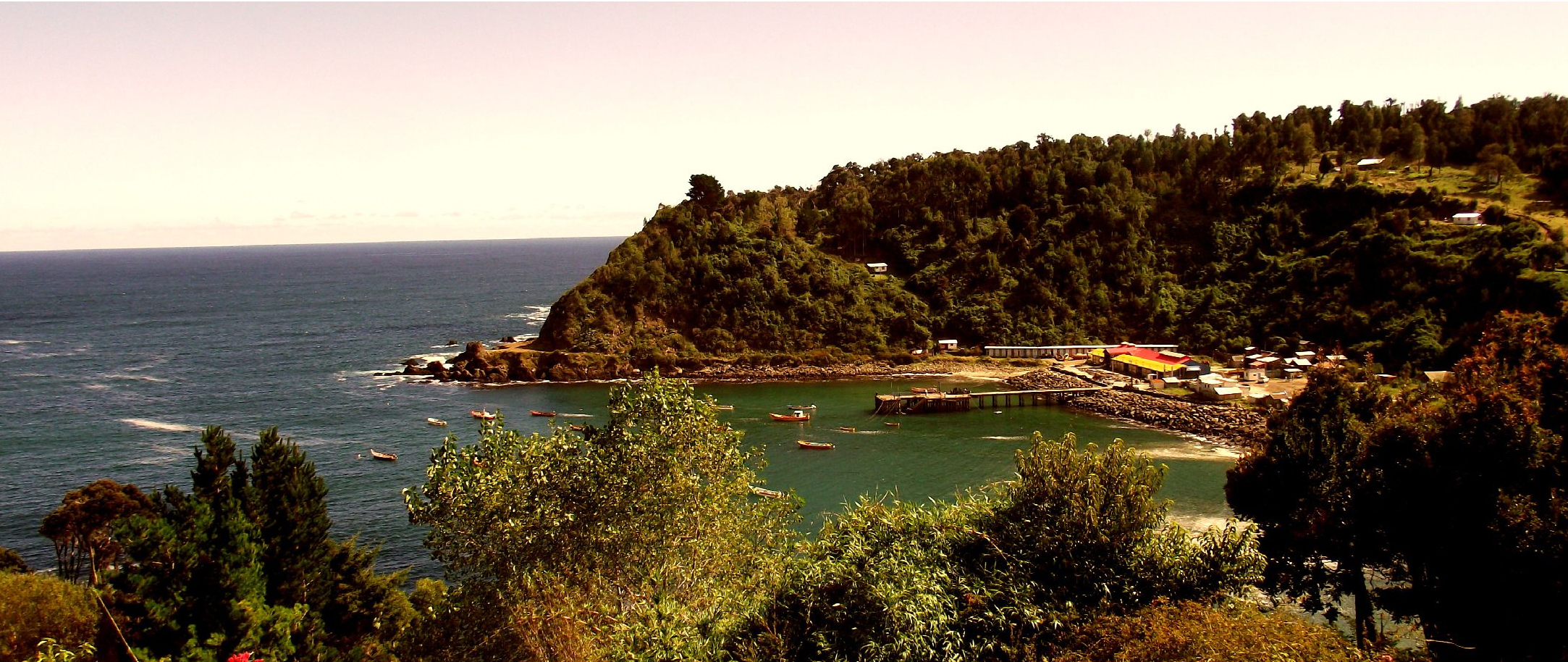
- Interactive map of Bahía Mansa
- Coordinates: 40°35′4″S 73°44′9″W
- Region: Los Lagos
- Province: Osorno
- Municipality: San Juan de la Costa
- Commune: San Juan de la Costa

Government
  - Type: Municipal
  - Alcade: Bernardo Candia Henríquez (DC)
- Elevation: 10 m (33 ft)

Population (2002)
  - Total: 902 (including Maicolpue)
- Time zone: UTC−04:00 (Chilean Standard)
  - Summer (DST): UTC−03:00 (Chilean Daylight)
- Area code: Country + town = 56 + 64
- Climate: Cfb

Bahía Mansa is a settlement and bay located on the coast of Osorno Province, southern Chile. It is the main port between Corral Bay and Maullín River and the only port of Osorno Province. The town's economy revolves around tourism and fishing. Bahía Mansa is the namesake of the Bahía Mansa Metamorphic Complex.
