= Park Slope =

Neighborhood of Brooklyn in New York City

- Neighborhood
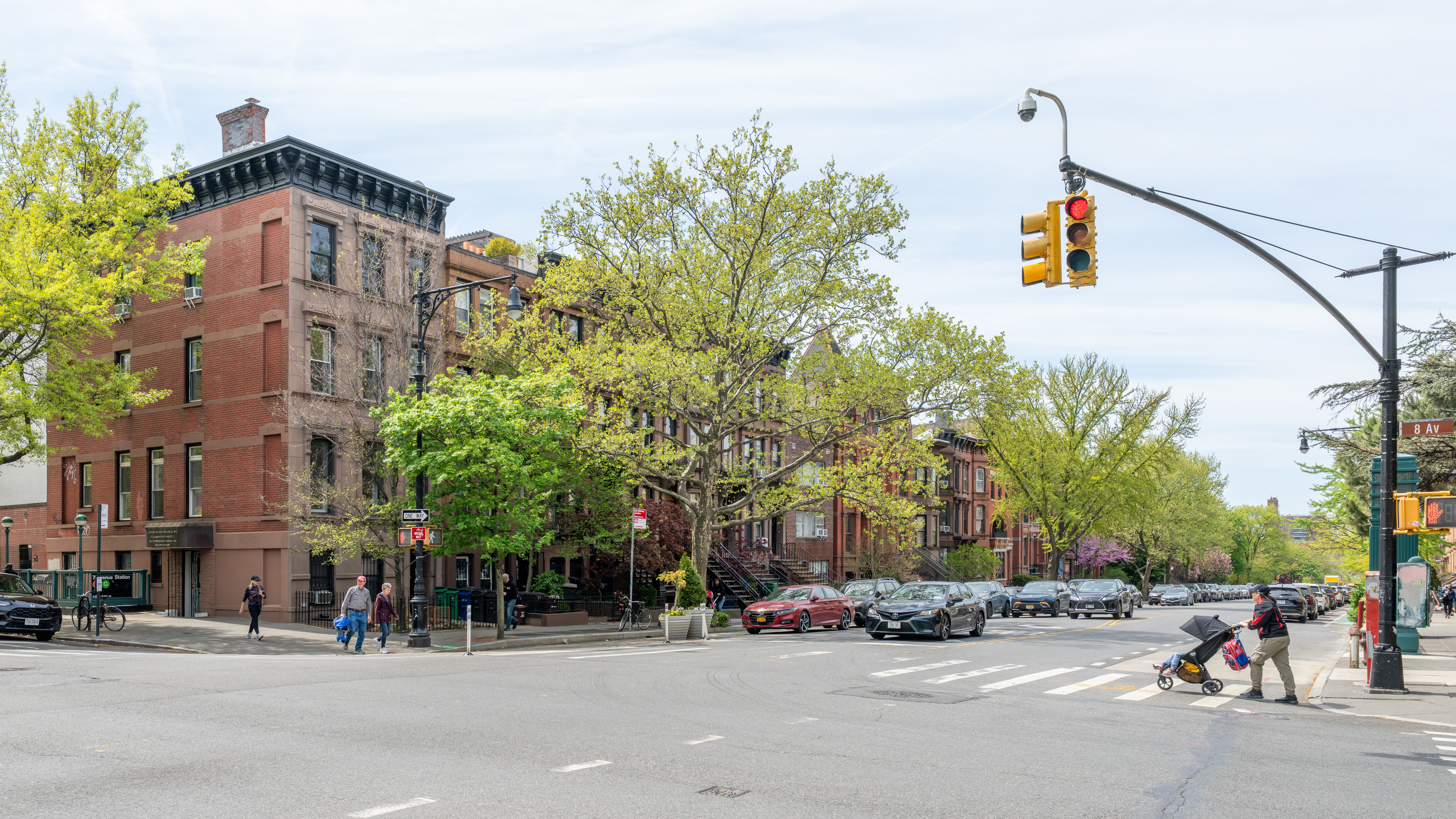
- Park Slope Historical District from 8th Avenue (2026)
- Location in New York City
- Coordinates: 40°40′14″N 73°58′50″W
- Country: United States
- State: New York
- City: New York City
- Borough: Brooklyn
- Community District: Brooklyn 6

Population (2022 NYC Planning Population FactFinder)
  - Total: 120,661
- Neighborhood tabulation area; includes Gowanus

Race/Ethnicity
  - White: 67.3%
  - Hispanic: 16.6%
  - Black: 6.4%
  - Asian: 6.0%
  - Other: 3.7%

Economics
- Time zone: UTC−5 (Eastern)
  - Summer (DST): UTC−4 (EDT)
- ZIP Codes: 11215, 11217
- Area code: 718, 347, 929, and 917

Park Slope is a neighborhood in Brooklyn, New York City, within an area known as South Brooklyn. Park Slope is roughly bounded by Prospect Park and Prospect Park West to the east, Fourth Avenue to the west, Flatbush Avenue to the north, and Prospect Expressway to the south. Generally, the neighborhood is divided into three sections from north to south: North Slope, Center Slope, and South Slope. The neighborhood takes its name from its location on the western slope of neighboring Prospect Park. Fifth Avenue and Seventh Avenue are its primary commercial streets, while its east–west side streets are lined with brownstones and apartment buildings.

Park Slope was settled by the Lenape before Europeans arrived in the 17th century. The area was mostly farms and woods until the early 19th century, when the land was subdivided into rectangular parcels. The western section of the neighborhood was occupied in the mid-19th century, being located near the industrial Gowanus Canal and ferries. After the completion of Prospect Park, numerous mansions and rowhouses were developed in Park Slope's eastern section in the 1880s. Park Slope faced social and infrastructural decline in the mid-20th century, but the building stock was renovated after the area became gentrified starting in the 1960s. Much of the neighborhood is overlaid by the Park Slope Historic District, which is composed of a National Historic District and a New York City landmark district.

Park Slope features historic buildings, top-rated restaurants, bars, and shops, as well as proximity to Prospect Park, the Brooklyn Academy of Music, the Brooklyn Botanic Garden, the Brooklyn Museum, the Brooklyn Conservatory of Music, and the Central Library and Park Slope branches of the Brooklyn Public Library. The neighborhood had a population of about 62,200 as of the 2000 census. Park Slope is generally ranked as one of New York City's most desirable neighborhoods.

Park Slope is part of Brooklyn Community District 6, and its primary ZIP Codes are 11215 and 11217. It is patrolled by the 78th Precinct of the New York City Police Department. Politically, it is represented by the New York City Council's 33rd and 39th Districts.

== History ==
=== Early settlement ===
Though modern-day Brooklyn is coextensive with Kings County, this was not always the case. South Brooklyn, an area in central Kings County extending to the former Brooklyn city line near Green-Wood Cemetery's southern border, was originally settled by the Canarsee Indians, one of several indigenous Lenape peoples who farmed and hunted on the land. The Lenape typically lived in wigwams, and had larger fishing and hunting communities near freshwater sites on higher land. Several Lenape roads crossed the landscape and were later widened into "ferry roads" by 17th-century Dutch settlers, since they were used to provide transport to the waterfront. One was the Flatbush Road, running roughly north–south to the east of the path of present-day Flatbush Avenue. Just north of modern-day Park Slope was the Jamaica Road, running east to Jamaica, Queens, on what is now the path of Fulton Street.

The first European settlement occurred in 1637-1639 when Willem Kieft, the Dutch West India Company's director, purchased almost all land in what is now Brooklyn and Queens. The area was used as farmland over the next two centuries.

During the American Revolutionary War, on August 27, 1776, the Park Slope area served as the backdrop for the beginning of the Battle of Long Island. In this battle, over 10,000 British soldiers and Hessian mercenaries routed outnumbered American forces, which resulted in the British occupation of Long and Staten Islands. The Battle Pass site is now preserved in Prospect Park, while on Fifth Avenue, there is a reconstruction of the Old Stone House, a farmhouse where a countercharge covered the American retreat.

=== 19th century ===
==== Early development ====
Transit from Park Slope improved in the early 19th century. The Brooklyn, Jamaica and Flatbush Turnpike Company was incorporated in 1809 to widen the Flatbush and Jamaica ferry roads, prior to the establishment of the Fulton Ferry to Manhattan in 1814. Afterward, stagecoaches started running on Flatbush Road in 1830, with omnibus service following four years later. The land comprising what is now Park Slope was still mostly undeveloped c. 1810. There were a couple of houses on and around Prospect Hill, a tavern, and a resort; the section of Flatbush Road through present-day Prospect Park contained ponds of standing water, which caused fevers and other illnesses. Soon afterward, the land was split up into rectangular parcels, which were bought by numerous people and cultivated as farmland. As in the rest of Kings County, the farmland was likely dependent on slave labor.

The farm parcels were further split in the 19th century, allowing for the development of smaller urban lots. After Brooklyn was incorporated as a city in 1834, the Commissioners Plan of 1839 was devised, a street plan that extended to South Brooklyn. Park Slope was originally located in the northern section of the Eighth Ward, which at the time was the city's least populous ward.

The Brooklyn and Jamaica Railroad started running on Atlantic Avenue, north of Park Slope, in 1836. The railroad's presence did not hasten the slow rate of residential growth in South Brooklyn because the locomotives provided slow and inefficient service. Horse-drawn railcar companies provided competition to the railroad: the first, the Brooklyn City Railroad, was founded in 1853. Other streetcar routes were founded, including a line on Flatbush Avenue in 1875, as well as the Atlantic Avenue Company's Fifth Avenue and Ninth Avenue lines, the latter of which served the Eighth Ward directly.

==== Prospect Park and further development ====
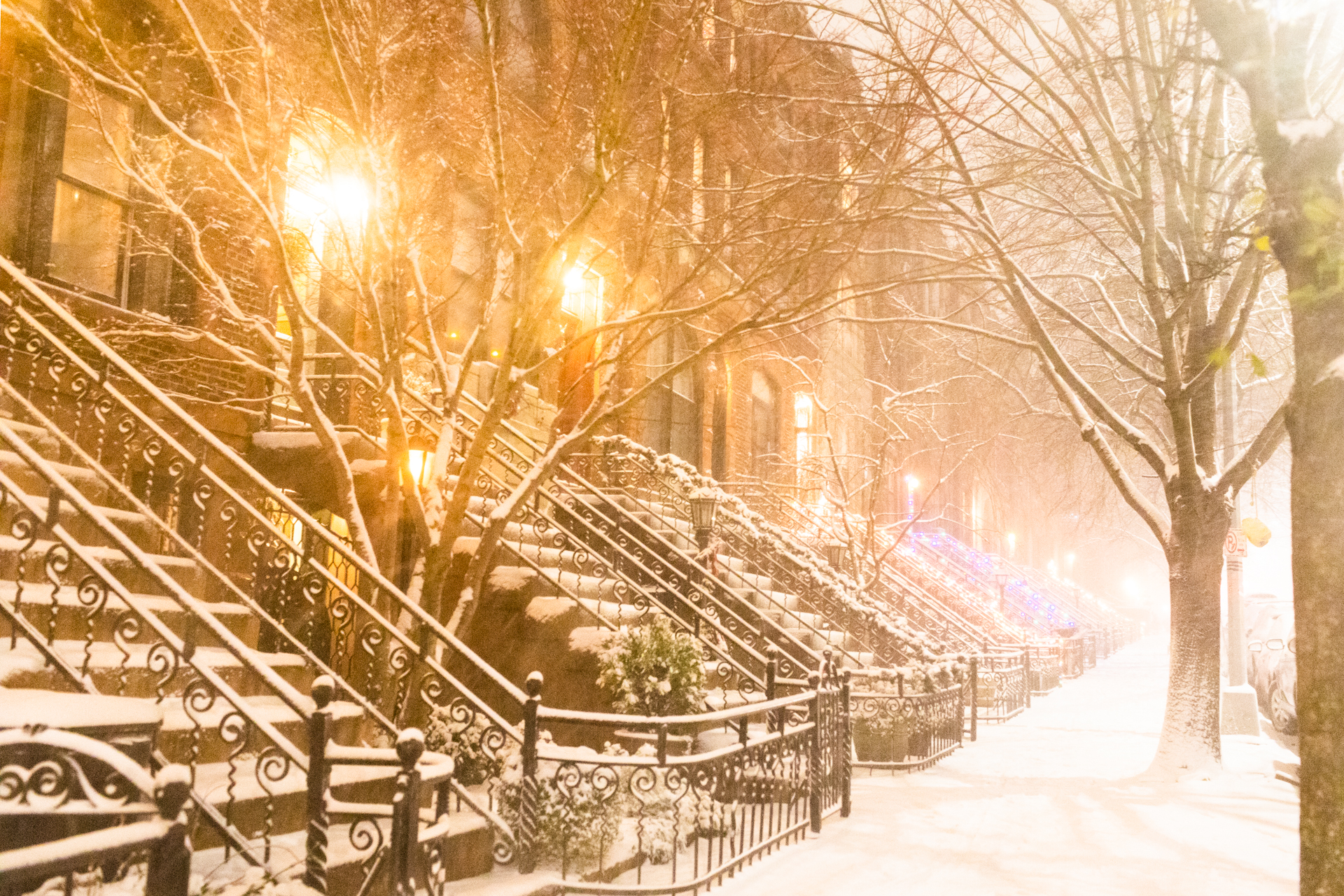
Park Slope Historic District during a blizzard

The first plans to develop modern-day Park Slope arose in 1847 when Colonel Daniel Richards requested permission from the Brooklyn Common Council to develop the Eighth Ward's streets. Richards also proposed the renovation of the nearby Gowanus Creek into a canal, including draining the marshes in its watershed. Between 1849 and 1860, under a decree by the New York Legislature, the Gowanus Creek was deepened. Simultaneously, a local lawyer and railroad developer named Edwin Clarke Litchfield (1815–1885) purchased large tracts of what was then farmland, erecting his Litchfield Villa on the east side of the neighborhood in 1857. Through the American Civil War era, Litchfield sold off much of his land to residential developers.

Development increased with the planning and creation of Prospect Park, just east of modern-day Park Slope. In February 1860, a group of fifteen commissioners had submitted suggestions for locations of four large parks and three small parks in Brooklyn. The largest of these proposed parks was a 320-acre (1.3 km^{2}) plot east of Ninth and Tenth Avenue in the Eighth Ward. After work was stopped during the Civil War, the proposed park's boundaries were changed, shifting the boundaries slightly west and south. In 1868, the City of Brooklyn purchased his estate and adjoining property to complete the West Drive and the southern portion of the Long Meadow in Prospect Park, for the then-exorbitant price of $1.7 million ($41 million in 2025). The modern-day Park Slope was split into the city's 22nd Ward the same year.

By the late 1870s, with horse-drawn rail cars running to the park and the ferry, bringing many rich New Yorkers in the process, urban sprawl dramatically changed the neighborhood into a streetcar suburb. The opening of the Brooklyn Bridge in 1883 led to further development in the city of Brooklyn. The Brooklyn Union Elevated Railroad extended its Fifth Avenue elevated line to South Brooklyn six years later. During the 1890s, the Brooklyn Rapid Transit Company added electric trolley lines or converted old stagecoach lines to electric service.

==== Upscale residential neighborhood ====
Many of the large Victorian mansions on Prospect Park West, known as the Gold Coast, were built in the 1880s and 1890s to take advantage of the park views. Early colloquial names for the neighborhood included "Prospect Heights" (later applied to the neighborhood north of Prospect Park), "Prospect Hill", and "Park Hill Side", before residents settled on Park Slope. By 1883, with the opening of the Brooklyn Bridge, Park Slope continued to boom and subsequent brick and brownstone structures pushed the neighborhood's borders farther. The 1890 census showed Park Slope to be the richest community in the United States. Realtors and community members saw a clear connection between Park Slope's bucolic setting and the comfort of living there. As the New York Tribune wrote in 1899, "Nature set the park down where it is, and man has embellished her work in laying out great lawns and artificial lakes, in bringing together menageries and creating conservatories, in making roads and driveways, and in doing everything in his power to make the place a pleasant pleasure ground and a charming resort."

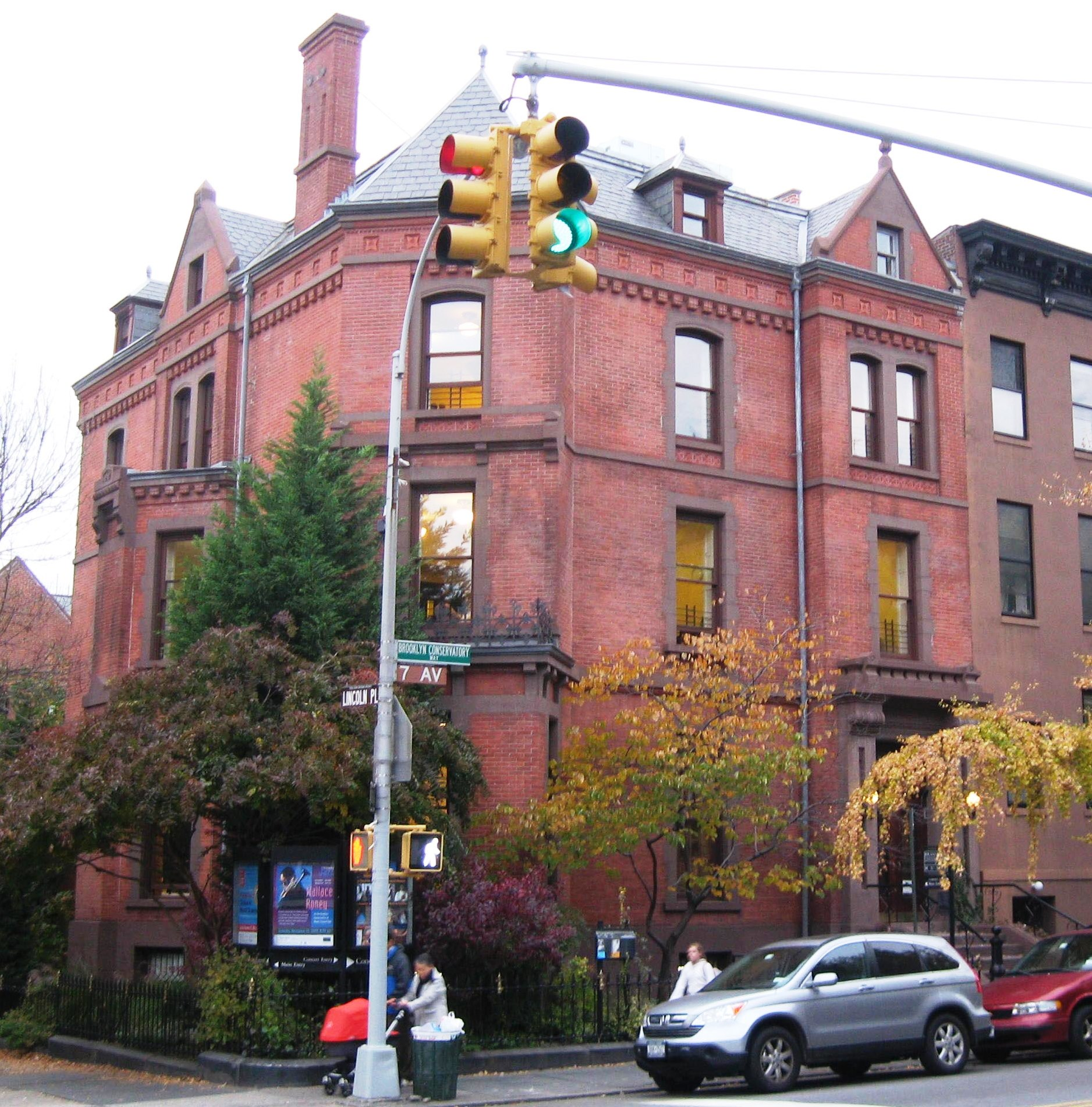
Brooklyn Conservatory of Music

Baseball had also played a prominent role in the history of the Park Slope area. From 1879 to 1889, the Brooklyn Atlantics played at Washington Park on 5th Avenue between 3rd and 4th Streets. When the park was destroyed by a fire, the team moved to two other sites. In 1898, the "New" Washington Park was built between Third and Fourth Avenues and between First and Third Streets near the Gowanus Canal. The team, by this point known as the Dodgers, played to an ever-growing fan base at this location, and team owner Charles Ebbets moved the team to his Ebbets Field stadium in Flatbush for the beginning of the 1913 season. The Federal League's Brooklyn Tip-Tops rebuilt much of the park in concrete and steel and played there for two years, in 1914 and 1915, before the league folded. A portion of the ballpark's wall still exists today on Fourth Avenue.

=== 20th century to present ===
Following Brooklyn's subsumption into the City of Greater New York in 1898 and accelerating in the 1910s, many wealthy and upper middle-class families fled for the suburban life, initially to outlying Brooklyn and Queens neighborhoods (such as nearby Flatbush) and thence to more distant locales in Westchester County, Nassau County and New Jersey amid the adoption of the automobile. Manhattan gained economic and cultural dominance in the consolidated city, helped by transportation improvements like the subway, which brought a more heterogeneous population to Brooklyn. Existing families adapted by relocating to exclusive districts in the other boroughs, most notably the Upper East Side. Accordingly, Park Slope gradually became a more working-class neighborhood amid the subdivision of the expansive Victorian-era housing stock into apartment buildings and rooming houses.

The socioeconomic changes were slowed by the ongoing development of upscale apartment houses on Prospect Park West and Plaza Street along with infill middle-class buildings throughout the neighborhood. Only a fraction of the area, centered in the traditional Gold Coast district and select adjoining blocks, retained wealthy and upper middle-class residents into the 1940s. The Emery Roth–designed 35 Prospect Park West, marketed as a competitor to the upscale apartment houses of Fifth Avenue, Park Avenue and Central Park West, opened right before the Great Depression in 1929, and contained a variety of luxury accommodations (including penthouses, duplexes and maisonettes) alongside "just plain apartments". While the building attracted such notable residents as pharmaceutical executive John L. Smith and remained a "solid fortress of wealth" for decades, it ultimately failed to anchor comparable development in the neighborhood.

By the 1950s, the working-class Italian-American and Irish-American populations predominated, though this changed by the 1970s as the black and Latino population of the area increased and the white ethnic population began to relocate amid the less exclusive, though effectively segregated, wave of postwar suburbanization. However, the area straddling Flatbush and Washington Avenues between Prospect Park and Atlantic Avenue began to attract a population that was mostly African-American and West Indian-American, similar to neighboring Crown Heights. This area was increasingly identified as the separate neighborhood of Prospect Heights, a moniker that had previously been used to identify areas of Park Slope outside the Gold Coast.

Some of those that remained reacted violently to the ethnic changes to the neighborhood; for example, white residents of Park Slope attempted to bar African-Americans from participating in after-school programs at William Alexander Middle School in 1966. After this failed, white teenagers engaged in firebomb attacks on African-American homes on Fourth Street. In 1968, a street fight between Italian and African-American gangs occurred at Fifth Avenue and President Street, using bricks and bottles as weapons; in the aftermath of the fight, fourteen African-Americans and three Italian-Americans were arrested.

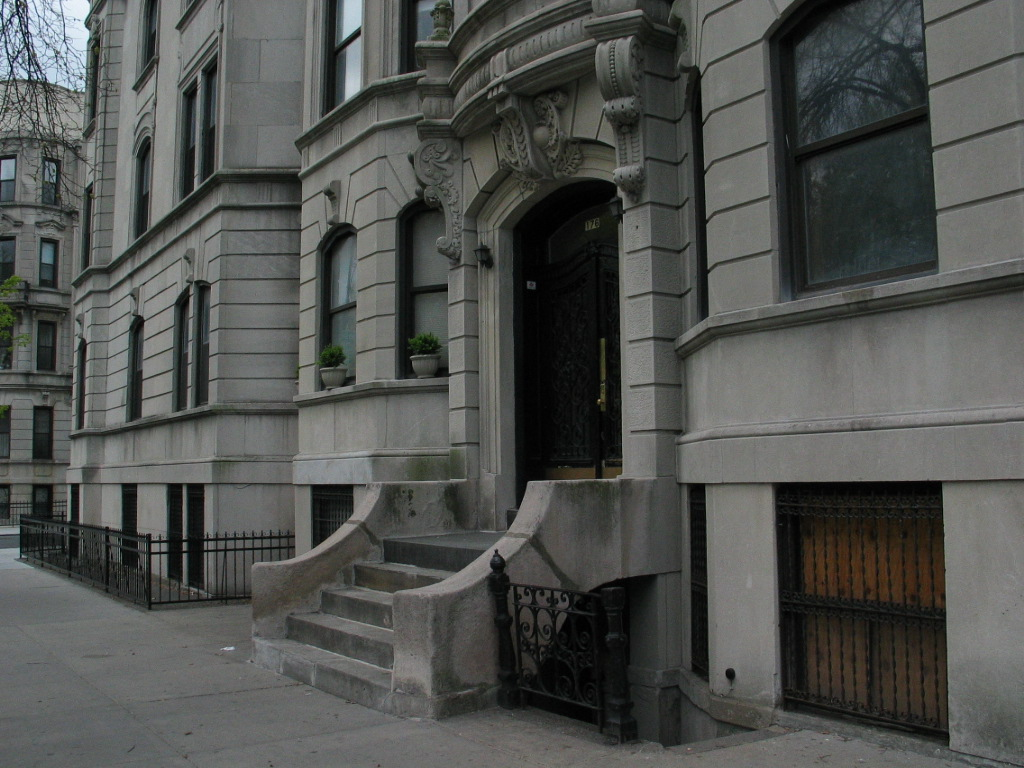
The architectural details of one of Park Slope's buildings

On December 16, 1960, two airliners collided above Staten Island, killing 134 people in what was the worst U.S. aviation disaster at that time. One of the airplanes, a Douglas DC-8 operated by United Airlines, was able to stay airborne for a few miles before crashing near the corner of Sterling Place and Seventh Avenue. Everyone on board was instantly killed, except for one 11-year-old boy, Stephen Baltz, who died the following night at New York Methodist Hospital. Six people on the ground were also killed.

In the late 1960s and early 1970s, the renovation of a now-$4.8 million brownstone along Berkeley Place sparked a trend where the rest of the brownstones were cleaned up and the grittiness of the neighborhood began to fade. Young professionals began to buy and renovate brownstones (which only cost around $15,000–35,000 at the time), often converting them from rooming houses into single and two-family homes. Preservationists helped secure landmark status for many of the neighborhood's blocks of historic row houses, brownstone, and Queen Anne, Renaissance Revival, and Romanesque mansions. After the 1973 creation of the landmark district, primarily above 7th Avenue, the rate of gentrification was sped up, and throughout the 1970s, the area saw an influx of young professional couples.

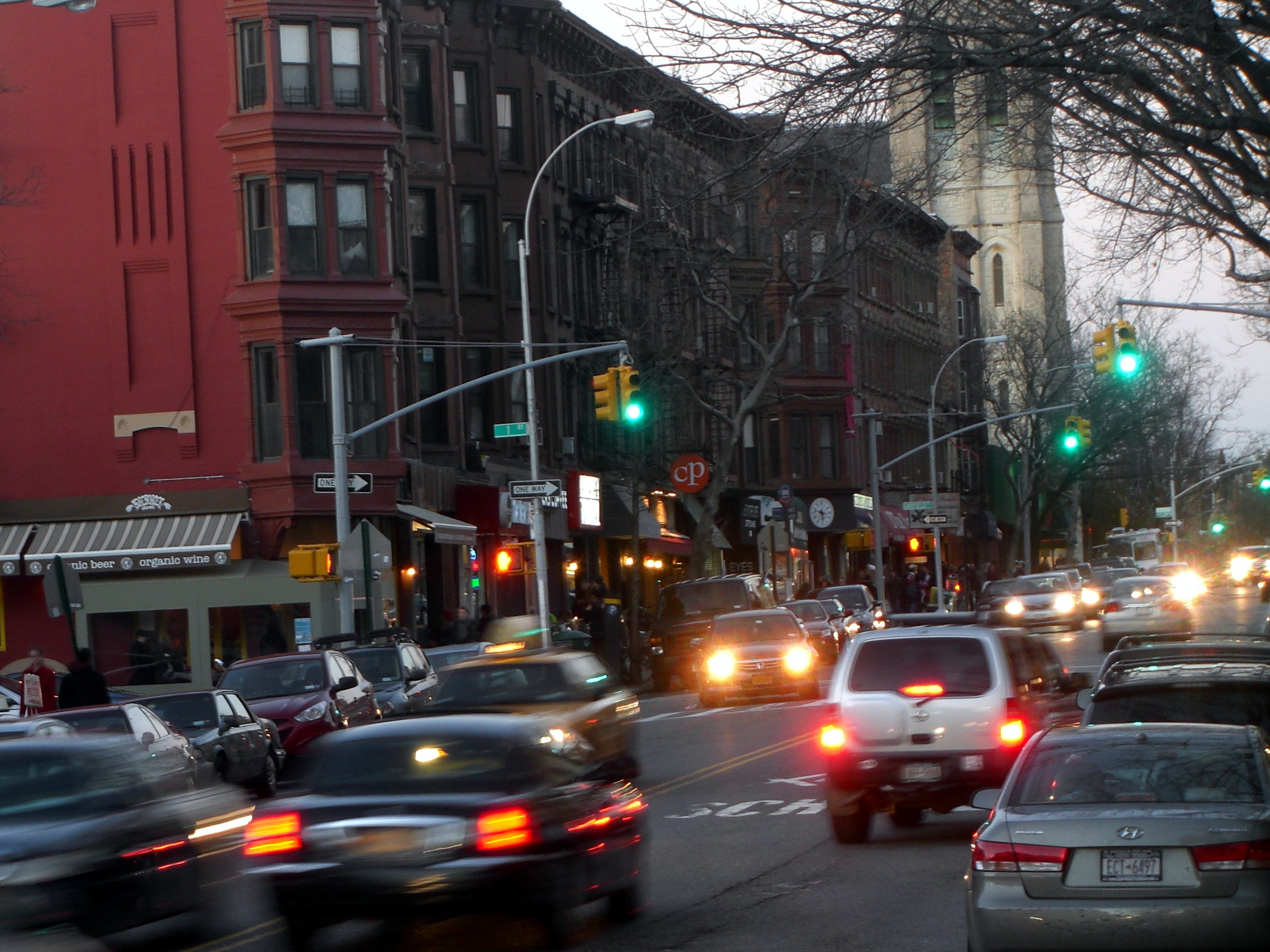
Seventh Avenue in Park Slope

By the early 1980s, however, even as the gentrification of the neighborhood was rapidly proceeding, crime was soaring, along with crime in the rest of New York City. The neighborhood was affected by daily armed muggings within the Prospect Park area especially at night primarily from the high crime neighboring area of UnderHill known as Prospect Heights. Gentrification accelerated during the 1980s and 1990s, as working-class families were displaced and discriminated due to classism regardless of race, many of those displaced being Italian, Irish and Hispanic. These gentrifiers were generally Manhtattanites attracted by the neighborhood's low cost of living and historic, turn-of-the-century housing stock. Following decades of socioeconomic precarity, the influx of the upper middle class has returned Park Slope to its Gilded Age milieu as one of the wealthiest neighborhoods in Brooklyn—and the nation. Sociologist and urban theorist Sharon Zukin has written of the trend, "In Park Slope, the middle class found a sense of history and a picturesque quality that fit their sense of themselves." Since the mid-1990s, gentrification has increased: a 2001 report by the New York City Rent Guidelines Board found that from 1990 to 1999, rents in Park Slope increased by 3.5–4.4% per year, depending on what kind of building the apartment was in.

== Land use ==
Park Slope contains a variety of zoning districts, including manufacturing, commercial, residential, and mixed-use. Much of the neighborhood is composed of rowhouses and six-to-eight-story apartment buildings, though Fourth, Fifth and Seventh Avenues contain residential structures with commercial space on the ground floors. The westernmost portion of Park Slope near the Gowanus Canal is a light industrial district. The section of Seventh Avenue south of Ninth Street is largely zoned for low-density commercial use.

=== Official landmarks ===
==== Historic district ====
- Park Slope Historic District
- U.S. National Register of Historic Places
- U.S. Historic district
- New York State Register of Historic Places
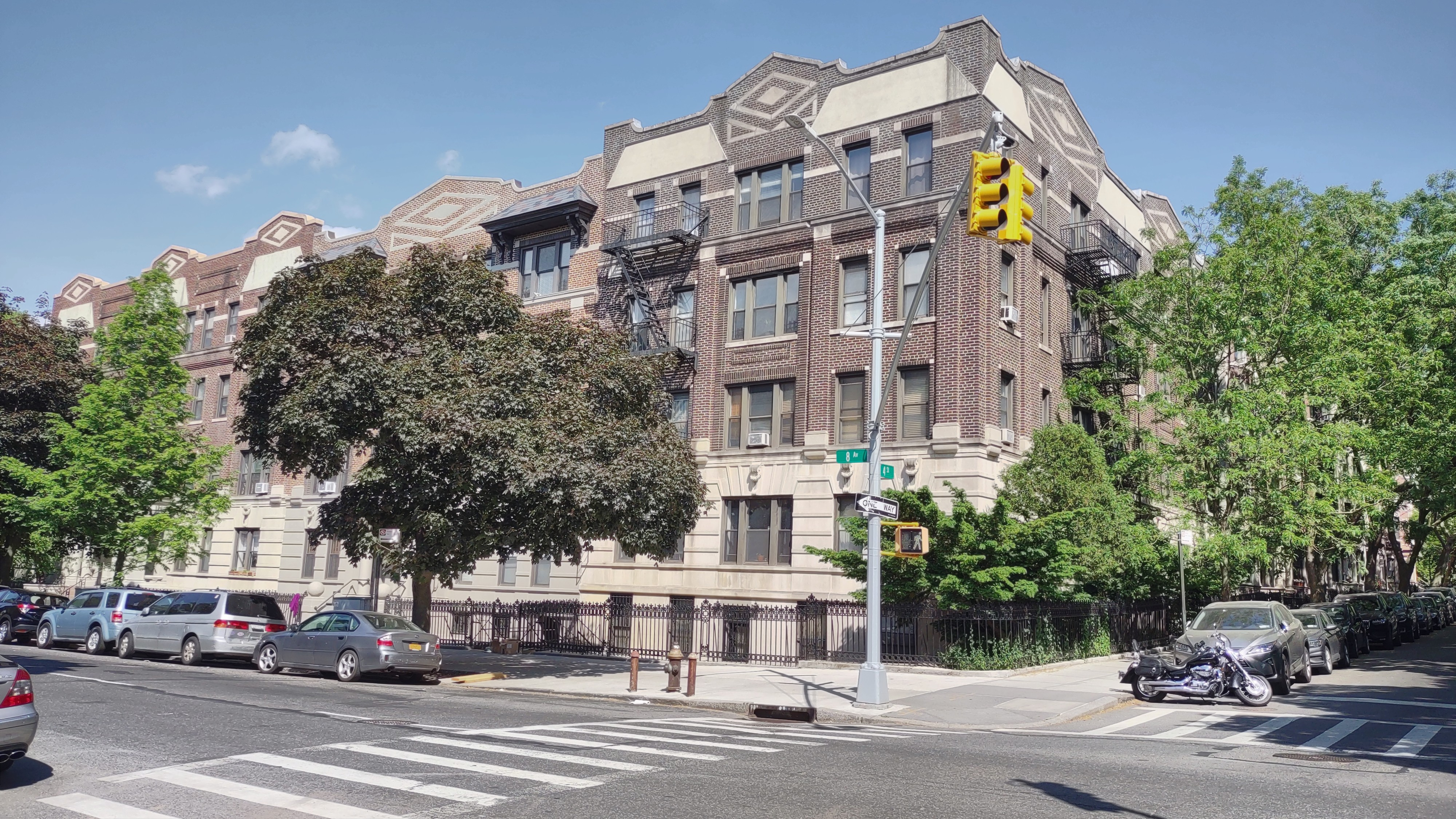
- May 2021

- Location within New York City Location within New York Location within the United States
- Location: Roughly bounded by Prospect Park West, Berkeley Pl., 15th St., 6th, 7th and Flatbush Aves., New York, New York
- Coordinates: 40°40′08″N 73°58′35″W
- Area: 150 acres (61 ha)
- Built: 1862
- Architect: Multiple
- Architectural style: Late 19th And 20th Century Revivals, Italianate, Romanesque
- NRHP reference No.: 80002636

Significant dates
- Added to NRHP: November 21, 1980
- Designated NYSRHP: June 23, 1980

Much of Park Slope is located within the Park Slope Historic District, which was listed on the National Register of Historic Places in 1980. The national district consists of 1,802 contributing buildings built between 1862 and about 1920. Covering 40 blocks, it is almost exclusively residential and includes a variety of two and three story townhouses built in a variety of popular architectural styles of the late-19th and early 20th centuries. It was listed on the National Register of Historic Places in 1980.

The historic district was also designated by the city's Landmarks Preservation Commission in 1973; the city-designated district was extended to the south in 2012 and to the north in 2016. After its 2012 expansion, the city district contained 2,575 buildings stretching over part or all of around 40 city blocks, becoming New York's largest landmark neighborhood.

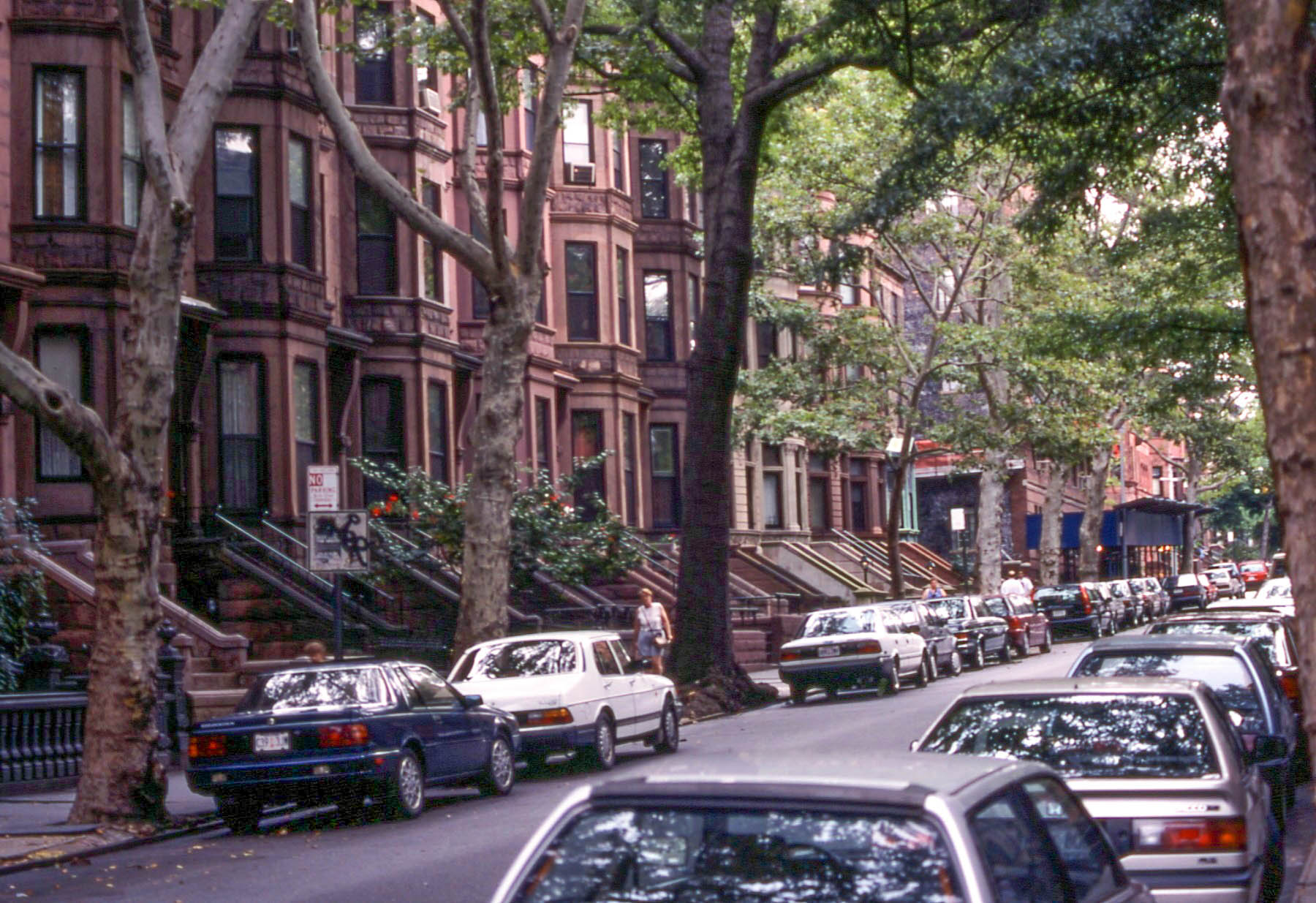
8th Avenue (1995)

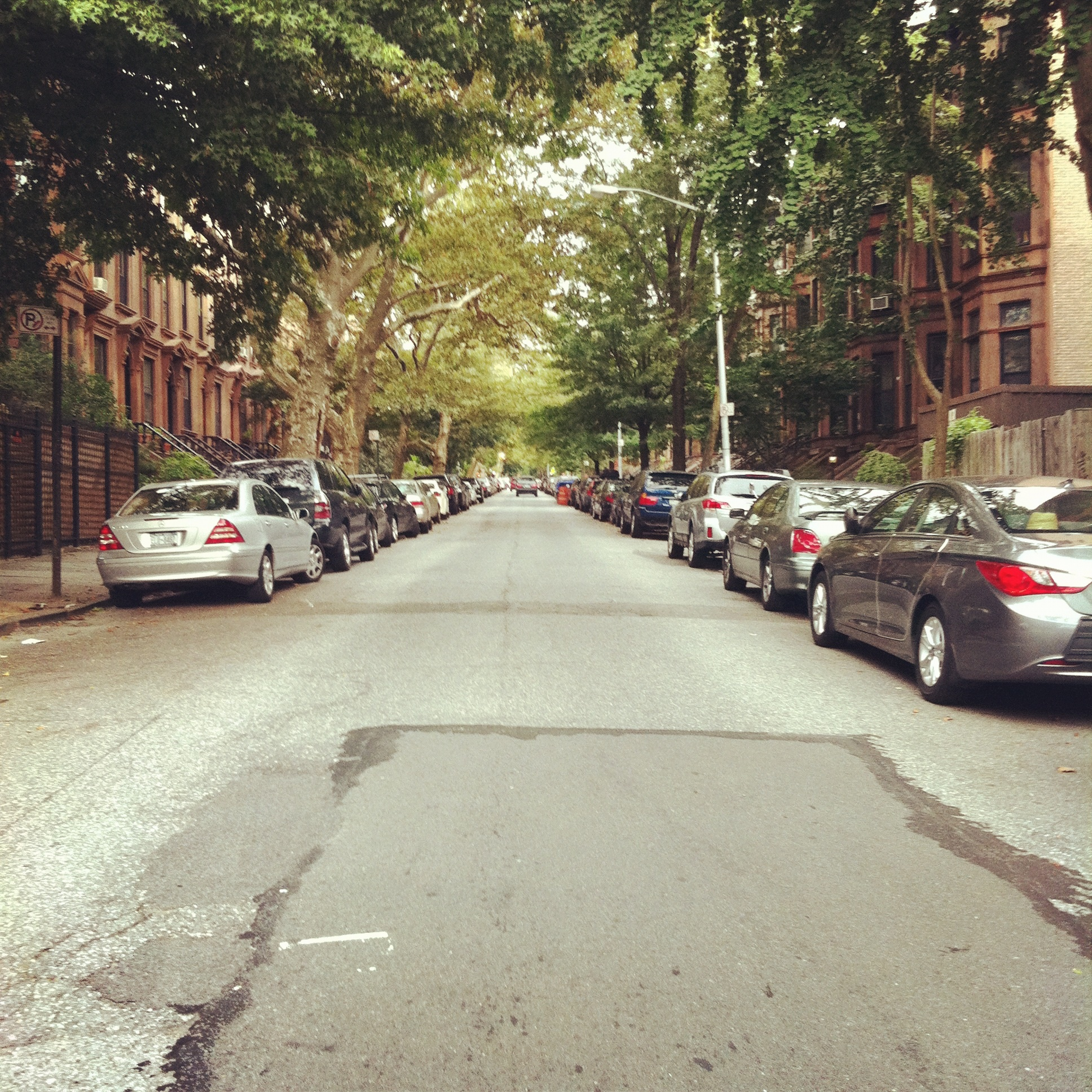
Park Slope (2012)

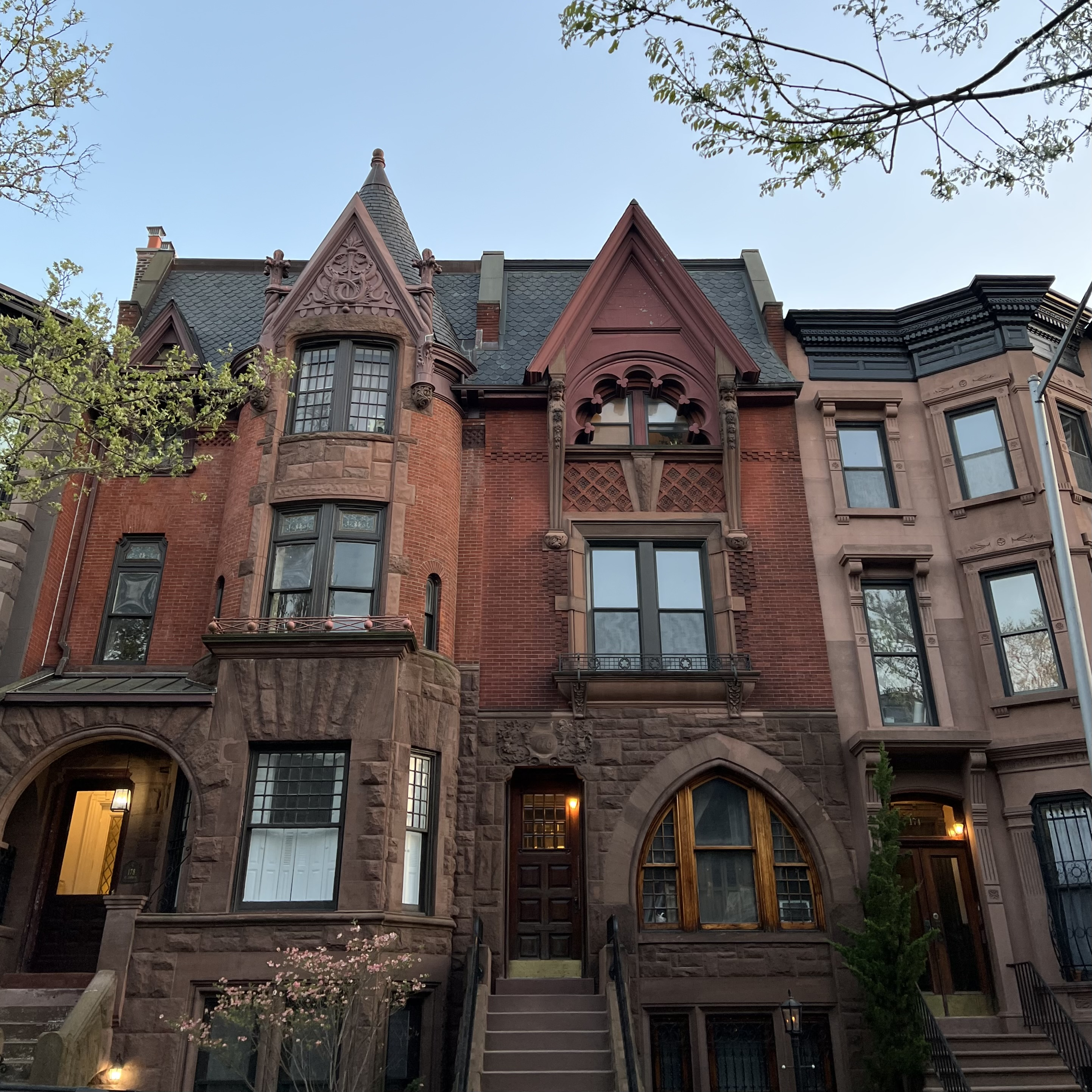
St. Johns Place (2023)

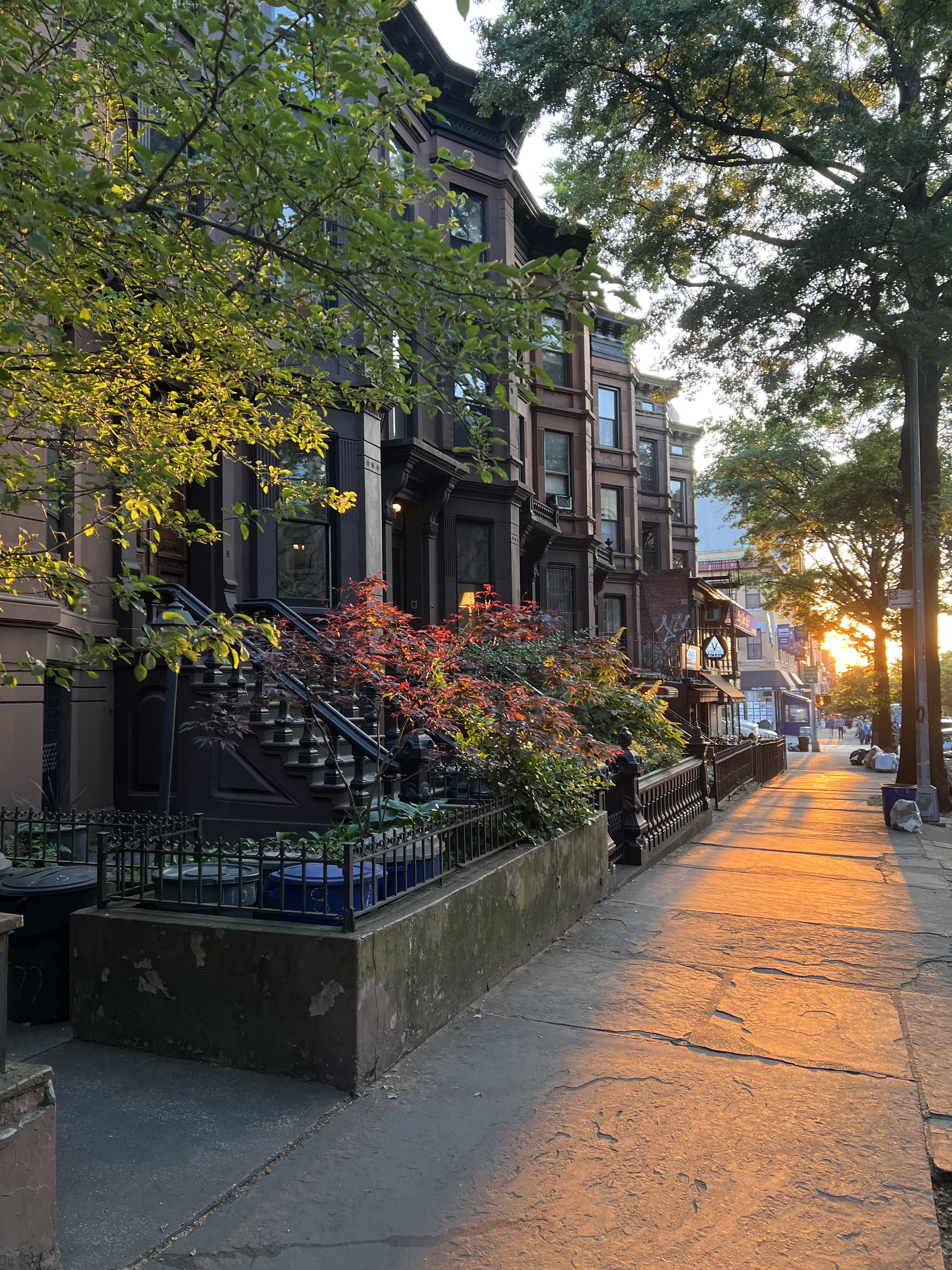
Union Street (2023)

==== Other landmarks ====
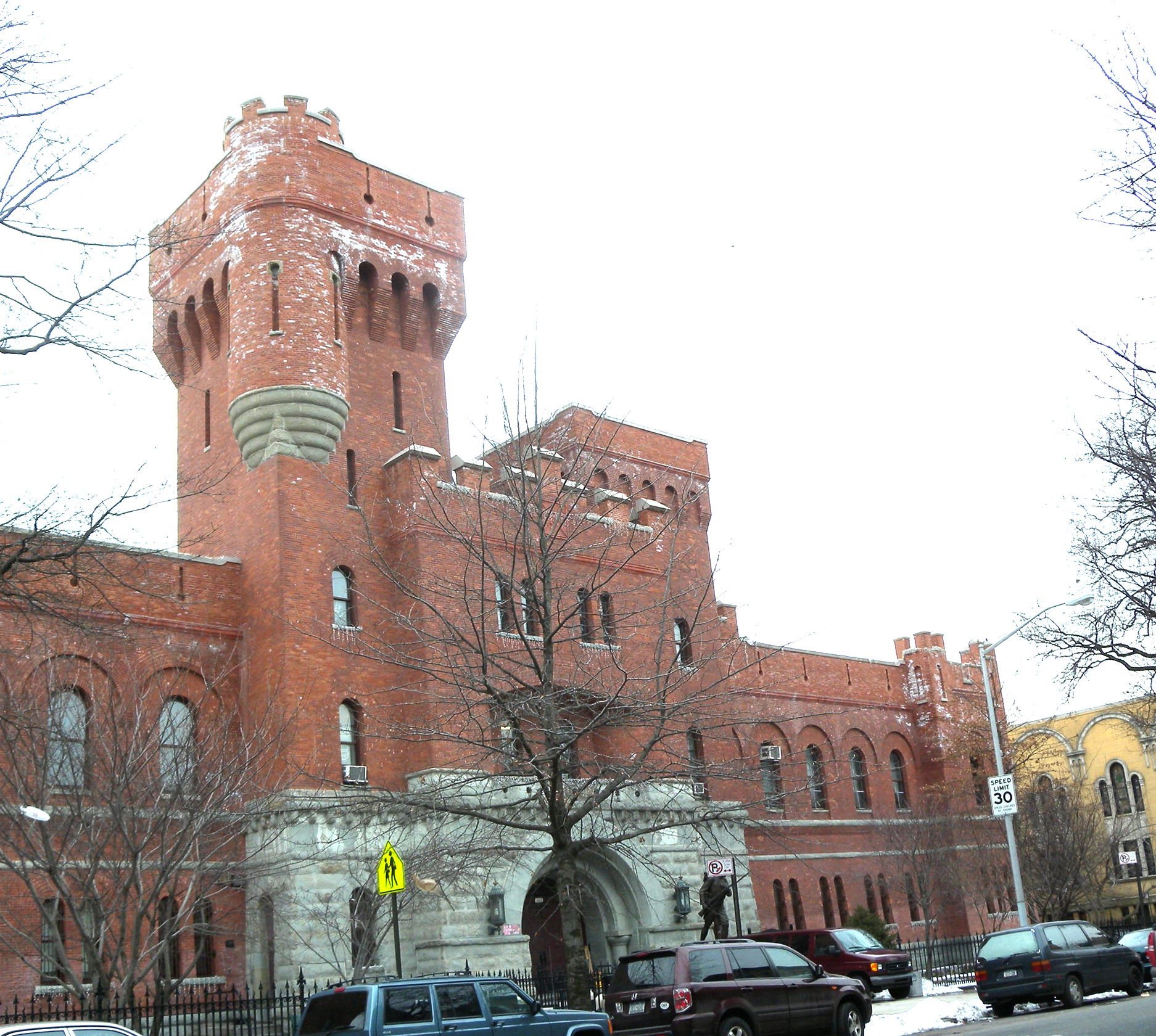
14th Brooklyn Armory on 15th Street

Several other structures in Park Slope are both NRHP and city landmarks:

- 14th Regiment Armory, an armory built in 1891–95 and designed in the Late Victorian style
- Litchfield Villa, an Italianate mansion built in 1854–1857 on a large private estate now located in Prospect Park
- Public Bath No. 7, a bathhouse built between 1906 and 1910 in the style of a Renaissance palazzo
- Public School 39, built in 1876–1877 in the Italianate and Second Empire styles
- William B. Cronyn House, built in 1856 in the Second Empire style

Additionally, the Brooklyn Public Library's Park Slope branch, a Carnegie library built in 1905–06, is a city landmark. The Fourth Avenue station and 15th Street–Prospect Park station are NRHP landmarks that are part of the New York City Subway System Multiple Property Submission (MPS). The Old Stone House, a 1930 reconstruction of the Vechte-Cortelyou House destroyed in 1897, is another NRHP listing and is located on Third Street between Fourth and Fifth Avenues.

The Grand Prospect Hall, an NRHP-listed banquet hall on Prospect Avenue, was built in 1892 and was demolished in 2022.

== Demographics ==
Based on data from the 2020 United States Census, the population of the Park Slope–Gowanus neighborhood tabulation area (NTA) was 74,731 a change of 7082 (10.46%) from the 67,649 counted in 2010. Covering an area of 961.17 acres (388.97 ha), the neighborhood had a population density of 70.4 inhabitants per acre (45,100/sq mi; 17,400/km^{2}).

The racial makeup of the neighborhood was 66.9% (49,995) White, 4.5% (3363) African American, 7.6% (5679) Asian, 5.2% (3886) from other races. Hispanic or Latino of any race were 15.8% (11,807) of the population.

The entirety of Community Board 6, which covers areas around Park Slope and Carroll Gardens, had 109,351 inhabitants as of NYC Health's 2018 Community Health Profile, with an average life expectancy of 81.4 years. This is slightly higher than the median life expectancy of 81.2 for all New York City neighborhoods. Most inhabitants are middle-aged adults and youth: 18% are between the ages of 0 and 17, 46% between 25 and 44, and 20% between 45 and 64. The ratio of college-aged and elderly residents was lower, at 5% and 10% respectively.

As of 2016, the median household income in Community District 6 was $134,804. In 2018, an estimated 10% of Park Slope and Carroll Gardens residents lived in poverty, compared to 21% in all of Brooklyn and 20% in all of New York City. Less than one in fifteen residents (6%) were unemployed, compared to 9% in the rest of both Brooklyn and New York City. Rent burden, or the percentage of residents who have difficulty paying their rent, is 37% in Park Slope and Carroll Gardens, lower than the citywide and boroughwide rates of 52% and 51% respectively. Based on this calculation, as of 2018, Park Slope and Carroll Gardens are considered to be high income and not gentrifying.

As of the 2020 census data from New York City Department of City Planning, there were between 30,000 and 50,000 White residents and 5,000 to 12,000 Hispanic residents, meanwhile the Black and Asian residents were each less than 6000 residents.

== Police and crime ==
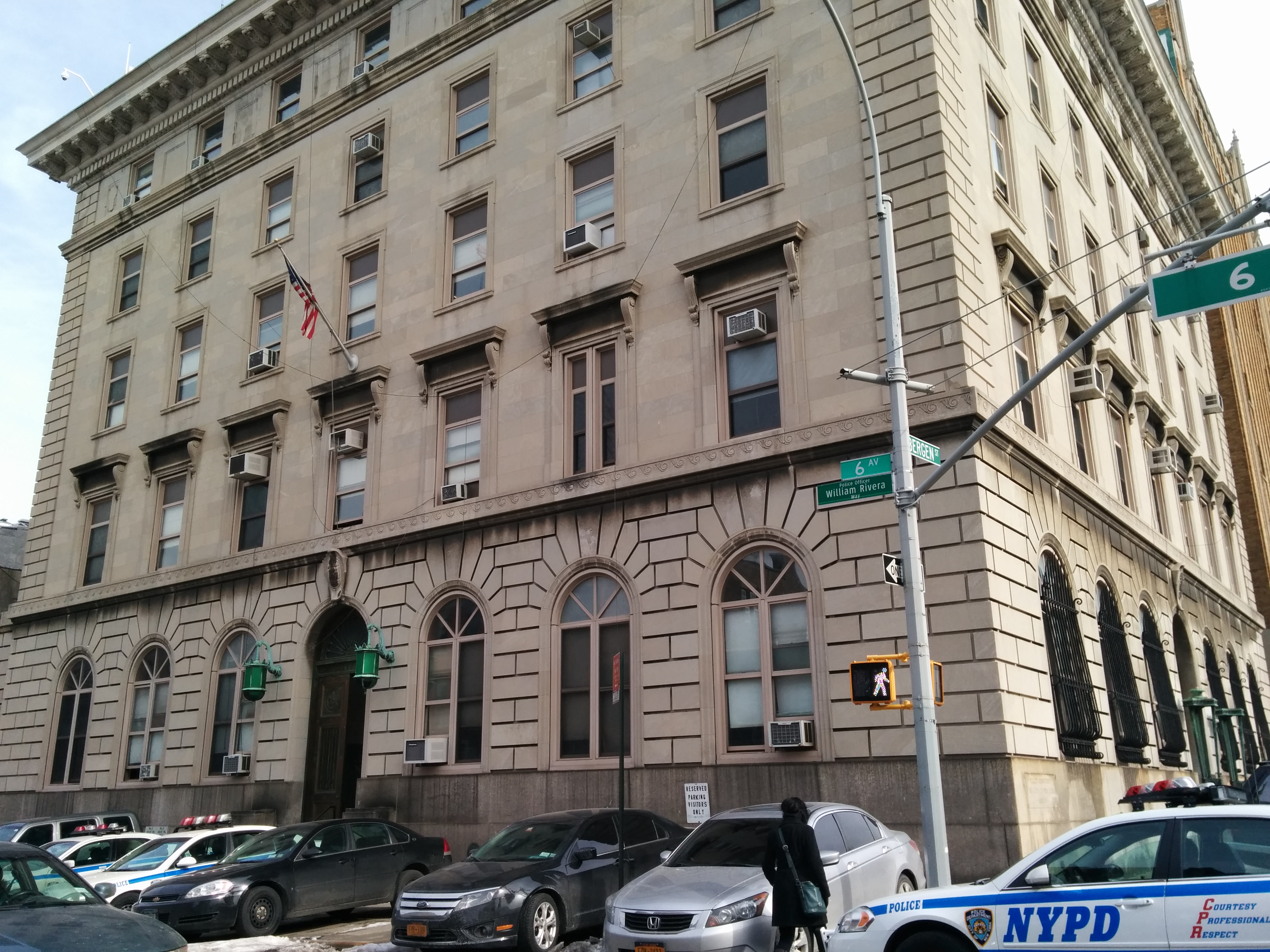
The NYPD 78th Precinct building

Park Slope is patrolled by the 78th Precinct of the NYPD, located at 65 6th Avenue. The 78th Precinct ranked 41st safest out of 69 patrol areas for per-capita crime in 2010. As of 2018, with a non-fatal assault rate of 30 per 100,000 people, Park Slope and Carroll Gardens' rate of violent crimes per capita is less than that of the city as a whole. The incarceration rate of 294 per 100,000 people is lower than that of the city as a whole.

The 78th Precinct has a lower crime rate than in the 1990s, with crimes across all categories having decreased by 77.3% between 1990 and 2023. The precinct reported 2 murders, 10 rapes, 124 robberies, 178 felony assaults, 181 burglaries, 553 grand larcenies, and 128 grand larcenies auto in 2019.

== Fire safety ==
The New York City Fire Department (FDNY) operates three fire stations in Park Slope:

- Engine Company 220/Ladder Company 122 – 530 11th Street
- Engine Company 239 – 395 4th Avenue
- Squad 1/Technical Response Vehicle – 788 Union Street

== Health ==
As of 2018, preterm births and births to teenage mothers are less common in Park Slope and Carroll Gardens than in other places citywide. In Park Slope and Carroll Gardens, there were 27 preterm births per 1,000 live births (compared to 87 per 1,000 citywide), and 7.9 births to teenage mothers per 1,000 live births (compared to 19.3 per 1,000 citywide). Park Slope and Carroll Gardens has a relatively high population of residents who are uninsured, or who receive healthcare through Medicaid. In 2018, this population of uninsured residents was estimated to be 22%, which is higher than the citywide rate of 12%.

The concentration of fine particulate matter, the deadliest type of air pollutant, in Park Slope and Carroll Gardens is 0.0089 milligrams per cubic metre (8.9×10^{−9} oz/ft^{3}), higher than the citywide and boroughwide averages. Fifteen percent of Park Slope and Carroll Gardens residents are smokers, which is slightly higher than the city average of 14% of residents being smokers. In Park Slope and Carroll Gardens, 15% of residents are obese, 6% are diabetic, and 22% have high blood pressure—compared to the citywide averages of 24%, 11%, and 28% respectively. In addition, 9% of children are obese, compared to the citywide average of 20%.

Ninety-four percent of residents eat some fruits and vegetables every day, which is higher than the city's average of 87%. In 2018, 88% of residents described their health as "good", "very good", or "excellent", greater than the city's average of 78%. For every supermarket in Park Slope and Carroll Gardens, there are 12 bodegas.

New York-Presbyterian Brooklyn Methodist Hospital is located in Park Slope.

== Post offices and ZIP Codes ==
Park Slope is covered by two ZIP Codes: 11217 north of Union Street and 11215 south of Union Street. The United States Post Office operates three locations nearby:

- Prospect Park West Station – 225 Prospect Park West
- Park Slope Station – 198 7th Avenue
- Van Brunt Station – 279 9th Street

== Community ==
Park Slope is considered one of New York City's most desirable neighborhoods. In 2010, it was ranked number 1 in New York by New York Magazine, citing its quality public schools, dining, nightlife, shopping, access to public transit, green space, safety, and creative capital, among other aspects. It was named one of the "Greatest Neighborhoods in America" by the American Planning Association in 2007, "for its architectural and historical features and its diverse mix of residents and businesses, all of which are supported and preserved by its active and involved citizenry." In December 2006, Natural Home magazine named Park Slope one of America's ten best neighborhoods based on criteria including parks, green spaces and neighborhood gathering spaces; farmers' markets and community gardens; public transportation and locally owned businesses; and environmental and social policy.

=== Institutions ===
- The Park Slope Food Coop, one of the oldest and largest active food co-ops in the United States, is located on Union Street and has approximately 17,000 members from Park Slope and other neighborhoods. Only members may shop there, and membership requires a work commitment of 2 3/4 hours every six weeks.
- The Park Slope Volunteer Ambulance Corps provides free emergency medical services to community members.
- The Brooklyn Conservatory of Music, part of the Brooklyn Queens Conservatory of Music, is a community music school, offering music classes, ensembles and choral opportunities, and individual instrumental and vocal lessons to students from 18 months old to adults. It was founded in 1897. In October 2026, the conservatory opened its second campus in Park Slope. This $17 million expansion, called BKCM Prospect Park West, doubles the conservatory's capacity to deliver music therapy and educational programs.
- Community Help in Park Slope, Inc. (CHiPS) is a soup kitchen that serves 600 men and women daily. Its Frances Residency Program provides shelter and support for young homeless mothers and their infants and toddlers; it was founded in 1971.

=== LGBT ===
One of the areas with a significant gay population in NYC, Park Slope hosts the famous Lesbian Herstory Archives that contain the world's largest collection of materials by and about lesbians. Notable LGBT nightlife spaces in Park Slope include the long-operating lesbian bar Ginger's and the queer bar and performance venue Good Judy. The neighborhood also hosts the annual Brooklyn Pride Parade and Festival.

== Religion ==
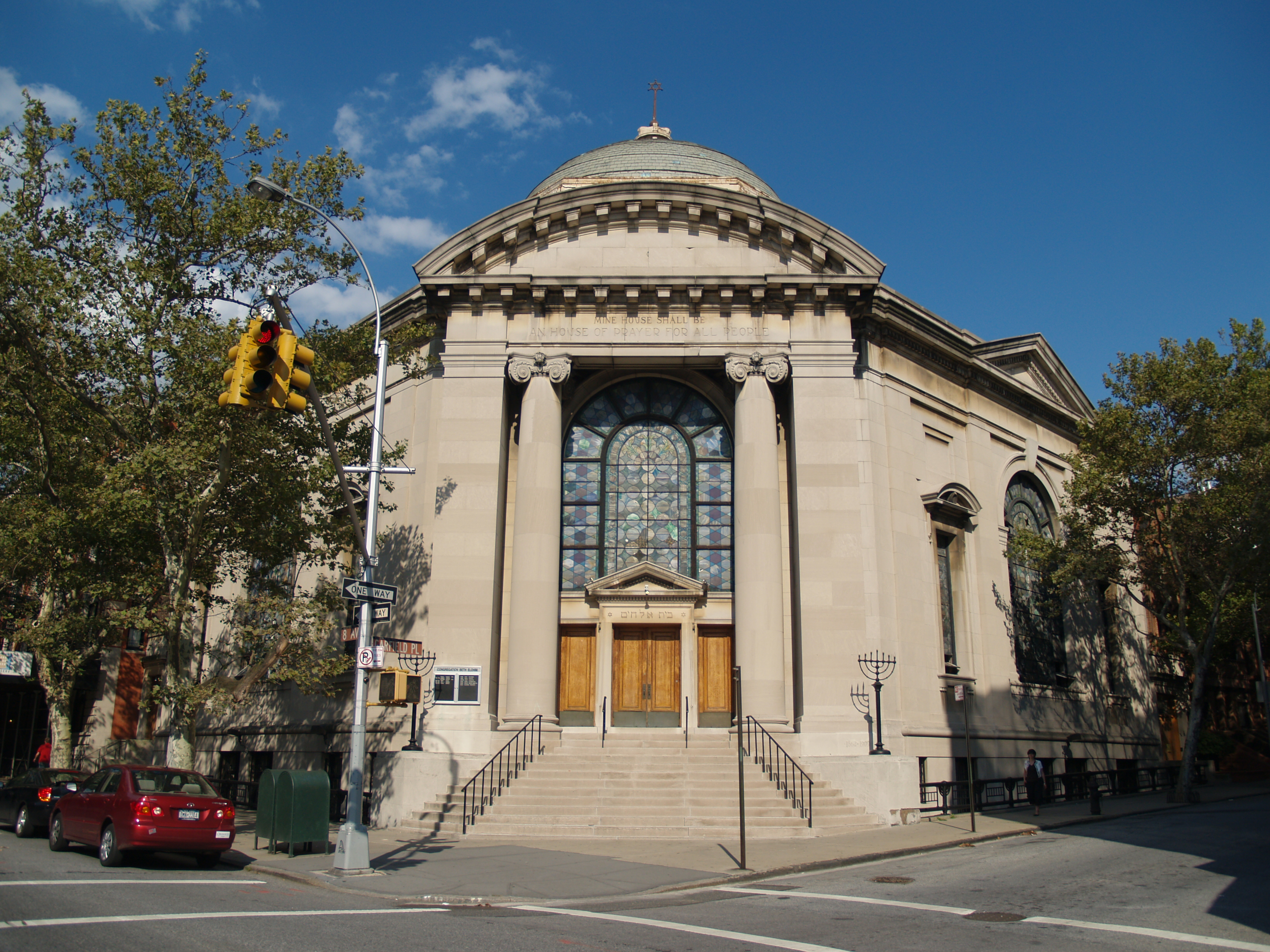
Beth Elohim

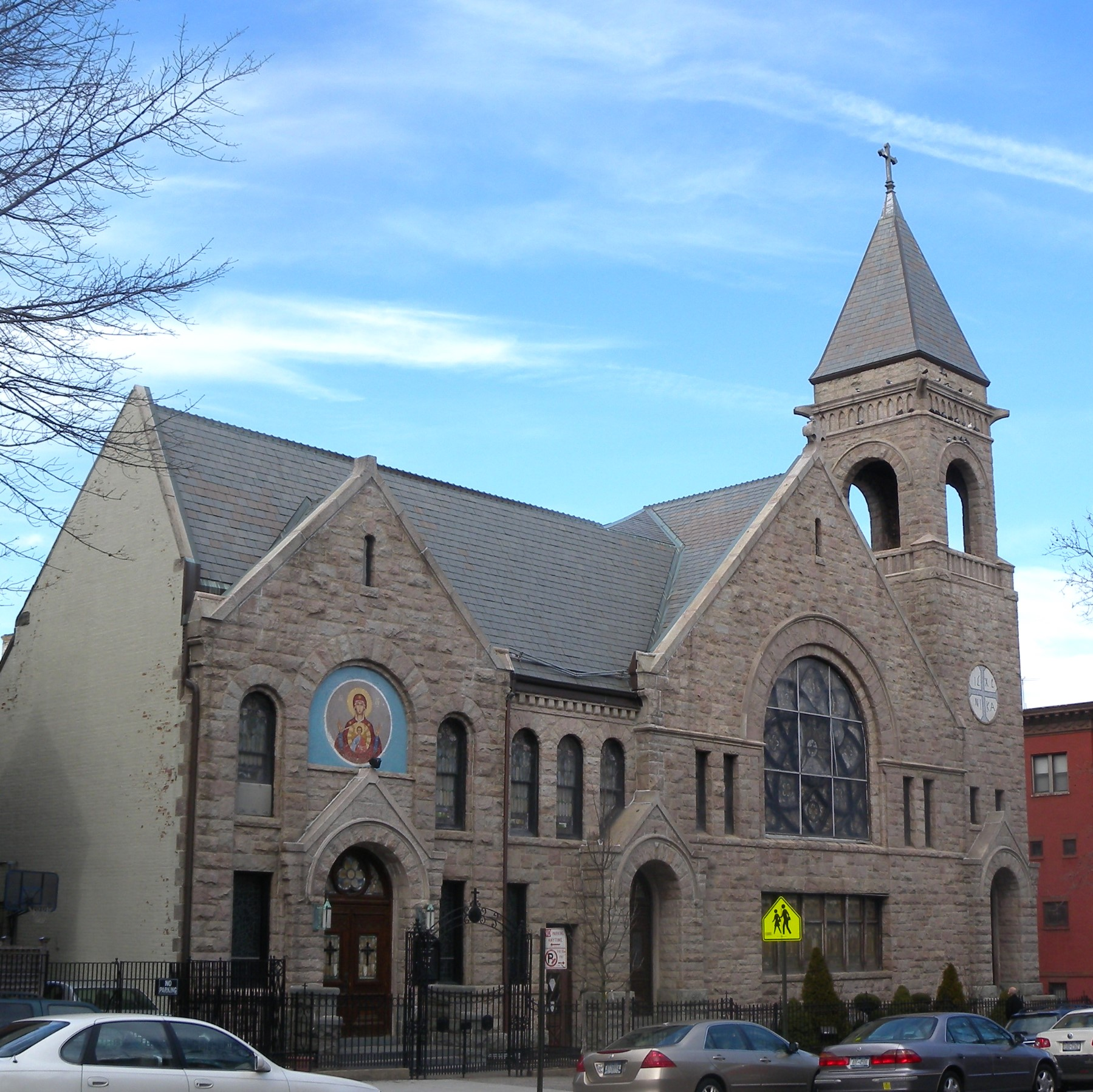
Melkite Catholic Church of Saint Mary

Park Slope is home to a wide variety of religious institutions, or houses of worship, including many churches and synagogues; most are historic buildings, and date back many decades.

=== Churches ===
- All Nations Baptist Church (Baptist)
- All Saints' Church (Episcopal)
- Church of Gethsemane (Presbyterian)
- Grace United Methodist Church of Brooklyn (Methodist)
- Greenwood Baptist Church (Baptist)
- Kingsboro Temple of Seventh-day Adventists (Seventh-day Adventist)
- Holy Name of Jesus (Roman Catholic)
- Memorial Baptist Church (Baptist)
- Old First Reformed Church (Reformed)
- Park Slope United Methodist Church (Methodist)
- Resurrection Coptic Catholic Chapel (Coptic)
- St Augustine-St Francis Xavier (Roman Catholic)
- St John's (Episcopal)
- St John–St Matthew–Emanuel (Lutheran [ELCA])
- St Mary's (Melkite Eastern Rite Catholic)
- St Saviour (Roman Catholic)
- St Thomas Aquinas (Roman Catholic)
- Trinity Grace Church (Non-Denominational)
- Emmanuel Pentecostal Church (Pentecostal)

=== Synagogues ===
There is a significant Jewish population in Park Slope, allowing for a number of synagogues along the religious spectrum. In addition to a number of synagogues, there is an eruv, sponsored by members of the various communities, that surrounds Park Slope.

Synagogues include:

- Park Slope Jewish Center (Conservative), 14th Street and Eighth Avenue
- Congregation B'nai Jacob (Modern Orthodox), 401 9th Street
- Congregation Beth Elohim (Reform), 274 Garfield Place; this is the largest Reform synagogue in Brooklyn, and also the longest-running congregation
- Congregation Kolot Chayeinu (unaffiliated, progressive), 1012 Eighth Avenue

== Education ==
Park Slope and Carroll Gardens generally have a much higher ratio of college-educated residents than the rest of the city as of 2018. The majority (74%) of residents age 25 and older have a college education or higher, while 9% have less than a high school education and 17% are high school graduates or have some college education. By contrast, 40% of Brooklynites and 38% of city residents have a college education or higher. The percentage of Park Slope and Carroll Gardens students excelling in reading and math has been increasing, with reading achievement rising from 41 percent in 2000 to 53 percent in 2011, and math achievement rising from 35 percent to 64 percent within the same time period.

Park Slope and Carroll Gardens's rate of elementary school student absenteeism is lower than the rest of New York City. In Park Slope and Carroll Gardens, 11% of elementary school students missed twenty or more days per school year, compared to the citywide average of 20% of students. Additionally, 77% of high school students in Park Slope and Carroll Gardens graduate on time, higher than the citywide average of 75% of students.

=== Schools ===
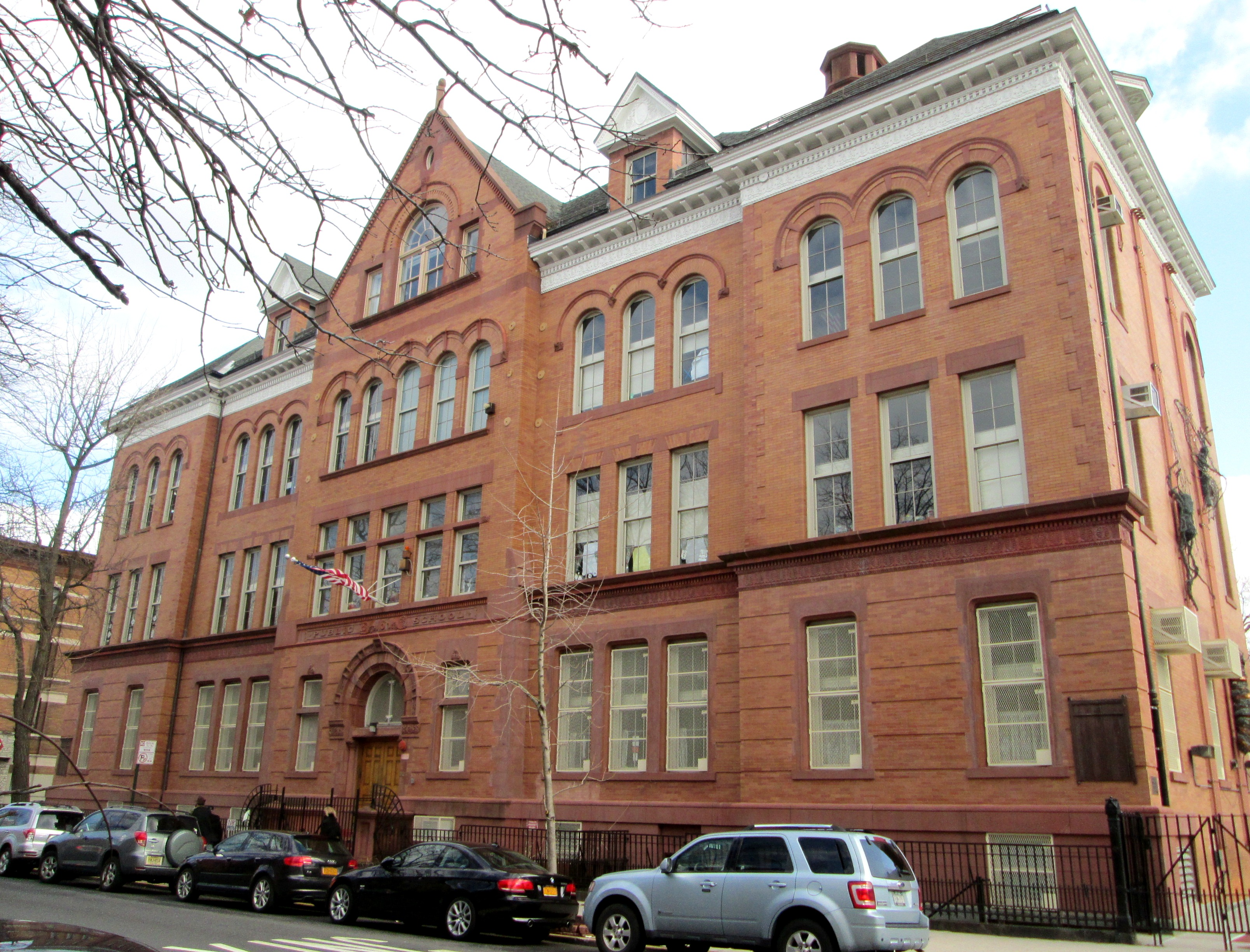
P.S. 107, the John W. Kimball School

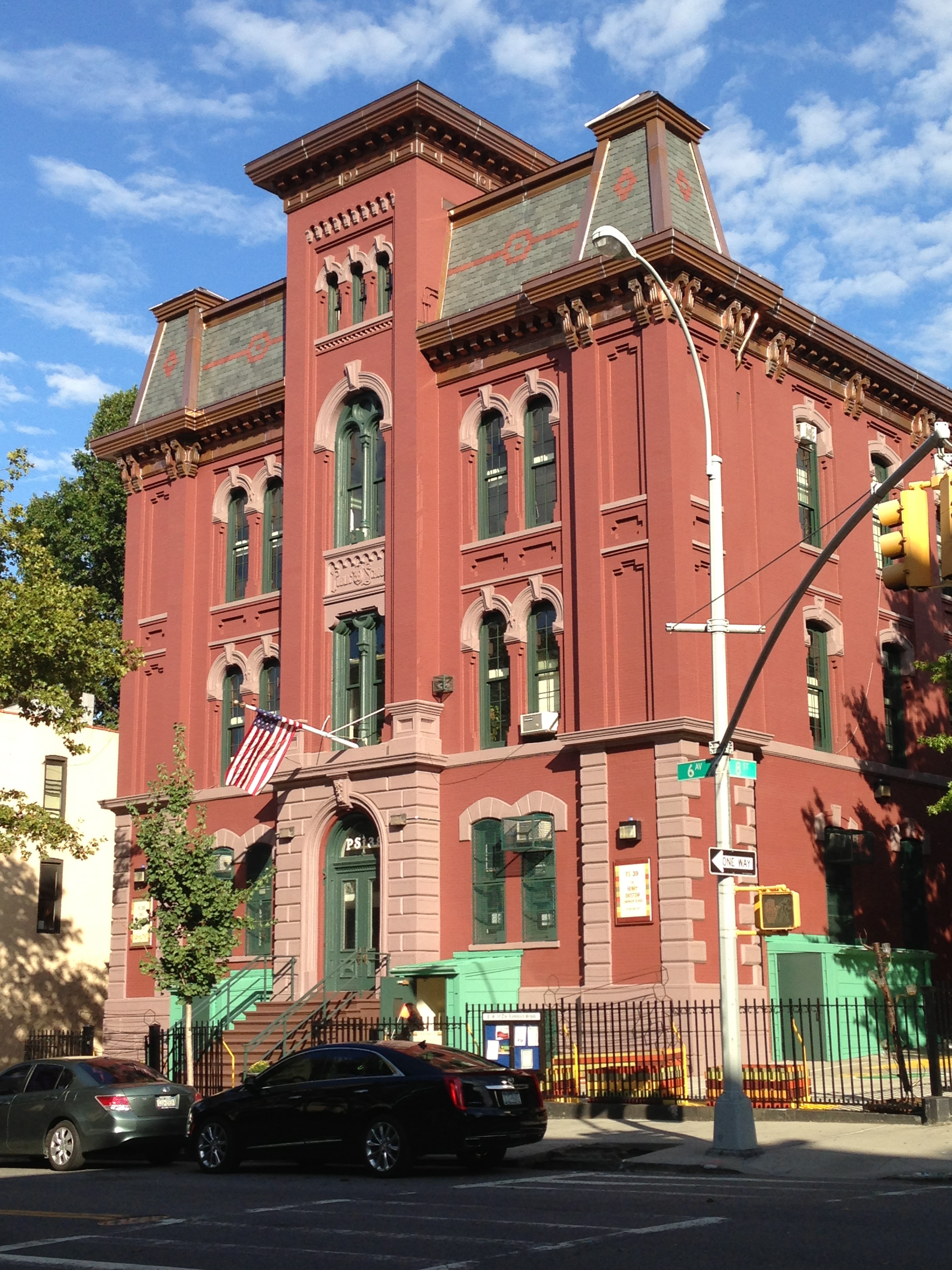
PS 39, The Henry Bristow School

==== Public schools ====
Public schools are operated by the New York City Department of Education. Park Slope is in two different community school districts – district 13 to the north and district 15 to the south. Students are zoned to their nearest elementary school. Both district 13 and district 15 place students in middle school based on the student's ranking of acceptable middle schools; the district 13 portion of Park Slope receives district 15 (not district 13) middle school choice, consistent with the rest of the neighborhood. The former John Jay High School is now the John Jay Educational Campus, housing three high schools and one combination middle/high school.

- PS 10, Magnet School of Math, Science, and Design Technology (grades K–5, dist. 15)
- PS 39, Henry Bristow School (grades PK–5, dist. 15)
- PS 107, John W. Kimball Learning Center (grades K–5, dist. 15)
- PS 118, the Maurice Sendak Community School (grades PK–5, dist. 15)
- PS 124, Silas B. Dutcher Elementary School (grades PK–5, dist. 15)
- PS 133, William A. Butler School (grades PK–5, dist. 13, with admissions open to both dist. 13 and 15)
- PS/MS 282, Park Slope School (grades PK–8, dist. 13)
- PS 321, the William Penn School (grades K–5, dist. 15)
- MS 51, William Alexander Middle School (grades 6–8, dist. 15)
- JHS 88 Peter Rouget (grades 6–8, dist. 15)
- MS 266, Park Place School (grades 6–8, dist. 13)
- John Jay Educational Campus (formerly John Jay HS, dist. 15). The building houses four schools:
  - Park Slope Collegiate (grades 6–12)
  - Millennium Brooklyn High School (grades 9–12)
  - Cyberarts Studio Academy (grades 9–12)
  - Secondary School for Law (grades 9–12)

==== Private schools ====
- Beth Elohim Day School (preK–K) on Eighth Avenue and Garfield Place.
- Berkeley Carroll School (preK–12) on Lincoln Place, between Seventh and Eighth Avenues; Carroll Street, between Sixth and Seventh Avenues; and President Street, between Sixth and Seventh Avenues.
- Brooklyn Free School (ages 5–15) on Sixteenth Street, between Fourth and Fifth Avenues. See democratic education.
- Bishop Ford Central Catholic High School (9–12) 500 19th St.
- Chai Tots Preschool Corner of Prospect Park West and 3rd St.
- Montessori School of New York (ages 2–13) on Eighth Avenue between Carroll and President Streets. See Montessori.
- Old First Nursery School (pre-K) the oldest cooperative nursery school in New York City located on Carroll Street at Seventh Avenue. The school has rented space from Old First for over forty years but is independent and not religiously affiliated with the church.
- Poly Prep's Lower School (part of Poly Prep Country Day School) (PreK–4) on Prospect Park West between First and Second Streets.
- St. Francis Xavier (Catholic School) (K–8). 763 President St. between 6th & 7th Avenue.
- St. Saviour Elementary School (Catholic School) (preK–8) 8th Ave between 7th and 8th Street
- St. Saviour High School (all-girls Catholic School) (9–12) 6th Street between 8th Avenue and Prospect Park West
- St. Joseph the Worker Catholic Academy 241 Prospect Park West (preK (age 3–8)

=== Libraries ===
The Brooklyn Public Library's Park Slope branch is located at 431 Sixth Avenue. Built in 1906, it was a Carnegie library branch, and was named the "Prospect branch" before 1975. The Brooklyn Central Library is located across Grand Army Plaza from the northeast corner of Park Slope.

== Transportation ==
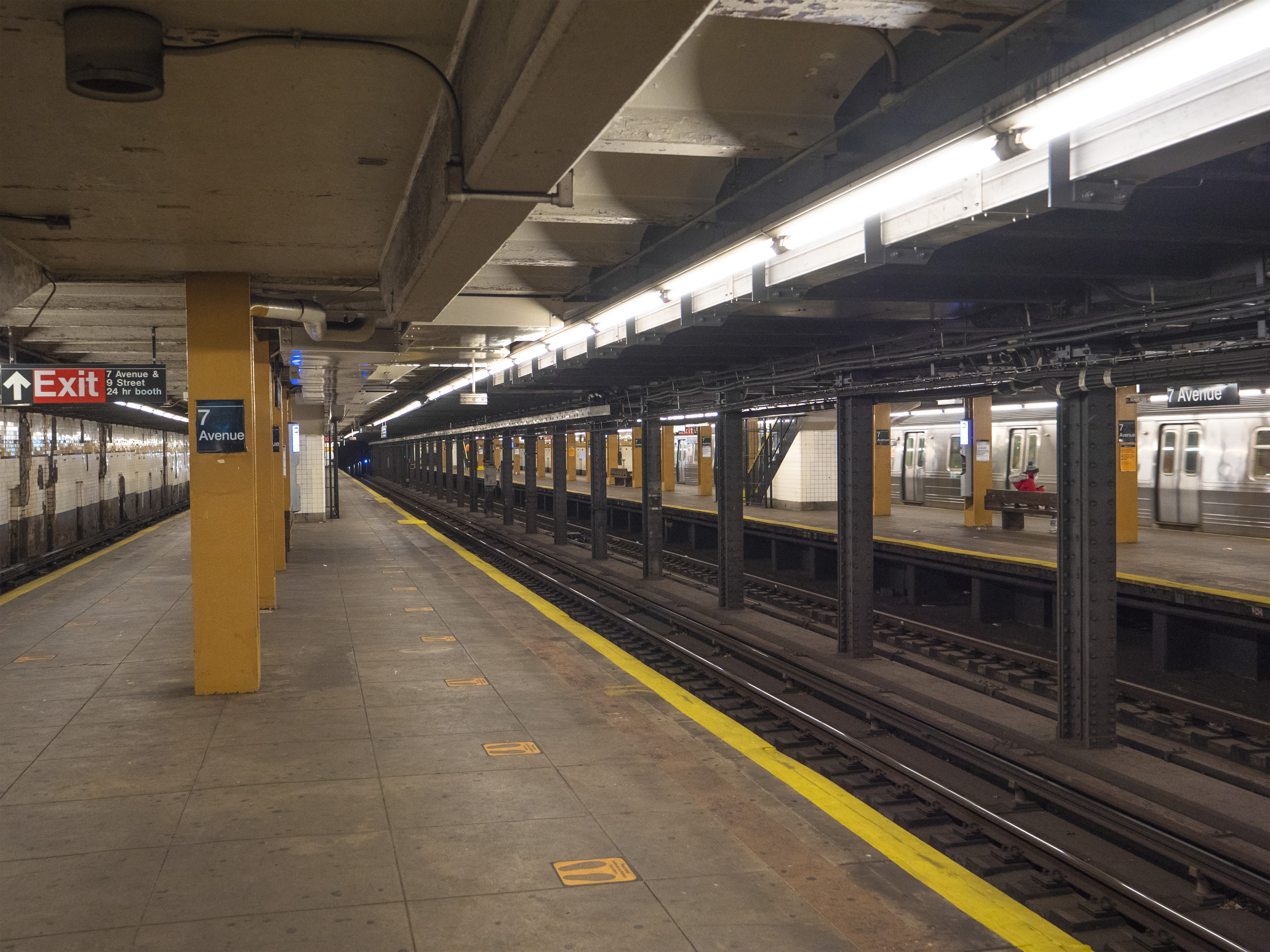
7th Avenue station

The neighborhood is well-served by the New York City Subway. The IND Culver Line (F, <F>, and G trains) runs along Ninth Street, a main shopping street, stopping at Fourth Avenue, Seventh Avenue and 15th Street – Prospect Park/Prospect Park West. The IRT Eastern Parkway Line (2, 3, 4, and 5 trains) runs under Flatbush Avenue with an express stop at Atlantic Avenue – Barclays Center, and local stops (served by the 2, 3, and 4 trains) at Bergen Street and Grand Army Plaza. The BMT Fourth Avenue Line's local trains (D, N, R, and W trains) serve Prospect Avenue, Ninth Street, and Union Street stations, with the D, N, R, and W trains all serving Atlantic Avenue–Barclays Center, an express station. The BMT Brighton Line (B and Q trains) also passes through the neighborhood under Flatbush Avenue making stops at Atlantic Avenue–Barclays Center and Seventh Avenue. All three stations at Atlantic Avenue are connected to each other.

Additionally, several MTA New York City Transit bus routes serve the area, including the B41, B61, B63, B67, B68, and B69.

== Notable people ==
Actors

- Jon Abrahams (born 1977)
- Paul Bettany (born 1971), actor
- Steve Buscemi (born 1957)
- Jennifer Connelly (born 1970), actress
- David Cross (born 1964)
- Kathryn Erbe (born 1966)
- Laurence Fishburne (born 1961)
- Maggie Gyllenhaal (born 1977), actress
- John Hodgman (born 1971), author, actor, and humorist
- Robin Johnson (born 1964), actress
- Chris Kentis, film director and screenwriter
- Terry Kinney (born 1954), actor and theatre director, who is a founding member of the Steppenwolf Theatre Company
- Laura Lau (born 1963), writer, director and producer, known as the writer of the films Open Water (2005) and Silent House
- Athan Maroulis (born 1964), actor, vocalist and record producer
- Kelly McGillis (born 1957), actress
- Wentworth Miller (born 1972), actor, model, screenwriter and producer
- Sarah Paulson (born 1974), actress
- Colin Quinn (born 1959), stand-up comedian, actor and writer, best known for his work on Saturday Night Live
- Keri Russell (born 1976), actress and dancer
- Peter Sarsgaard (born 1971), actor
- Streeter Seidell (born 1982), comedian, writer, actor, and TV host
- Michael Showalter (born 1970), comedian, actor, producer, writer and director
- Patrick Stewart (1940–2026), actor whose career included roles on stage, television and film
- Julia Stiles (born 1981), actress
- John Turturro (born 1957), actor, writer and filmmaker
- John Ventimiglia (born 1963), actor best known for his role as Artie Bucco in the HBO television series, The Sopranos

Athletes

- Race Imboden (born 1993), Olympic fencer
- Adam Ottavino (born 1985), Major League Baseball player
- Joe Pepitone (1940–2023), MLB first baseman and outfielder who played for the New York Yankees

Musicians

- Foxy Brown (born 1978), rapper, model and actress
- Jim Black (born 1967), jazz drummer
- Vince Clarke (born 1960), musician and songwriter
- Ravi Coltrane (born 1965), Jazz saxophonist
- Jonathan Coulton (born 1970), singer-songwriter
- Simone Dinnerstein (born 1972), classical pianist
- Dave Douglas (born 1963), jazz trumpeter and composer
- Mark Feldman (born 1955), jazz violinist.
- Michael Hearst (born 1972), composer, multi-instrumentalist, writer, producer and founding member of One Ring Zero
- Angélique Kidjo (born 1960), singer-songwriter
- Scott Klopfenstein (born 1977), musician and a former member of the band Reel Big Fish.
- Talib Kweli born 1975), hip hop recording artist
- John Linnell (born 1959), singer-songwriter of They Might Be Giants
- Kristen Anderson-Lopez and Robert Lopez (born 1975), songwriters / composers who wrote the song "Let It Go" for the movie Frozen
- Ingrid Michaelson (born 1979), singer and songwriter.
- Arturo O'Farrill (born 1960), jazz musician
- Pumpkinhead (1975–2015), rapper and hip hop artist
- Geoff Rickly (born 1979, lead singer and songwriter of Thursday
- Alex Skolnick (born 1968), guitarist, composer and podcaster; lead guitarist of the band Testament, founder of Alex Skolnick trio jazz and member of the band PAKT
- Chris Speed (born 1967), saxophonist, clarinetist and composer.
- Smoosh, band.
- Scott Tixier (born 1986), jazz violinist and recording artist
- Michael Weiss (born 1958), jazz pianist and composer
- Cameron Winter (born 2002), solo musician and frontman of Geese
- Dan Zanes (born 1961), member of the 1980s band The Del Fuegos

Artists

- Janine Antoni (born 1964), contemporary artist, who creates work in performance art, sculpture and photography
- Jean-Michel Basquiat (1960–1988), artist best known for his neo-expressionist paintings
- Alex Grey (born 1953), visionary artist, author, teacher and Vajrayana practitioner
- Brett Helquist (born 1966), illustrator best known for his work in A Series of Unfortunate Events
- Paul Ramirez Jonas (born 1965), contemporary artist and arts educator
- Byron Kim (born 1961), contemporary artist
- Joe Mangrum (born 1969), artist best known for his large-scale colored sand paintings
- David Rees (born 1972), cartoonist, humorist and cultural critic
- Lisa Sigal (born 1962), contemporary artist
- Joan Snyder (born 1940), painter
- Lane Twitchell (born 1967), contemporary visual artist

Suffragist

- Lucy Burns (1879–1966), suffragist and women's rights advocate

Writers

- Paul Auster (born 1947), author whose works include The Brooklyn Follies
- Franco Ambriz, playwright and director
- Joan Bauer (born 1951), author of young adult fiction
- Richard Bernstein (born 1944), journalist who writes the Letter from America column for The International Herald Tribune
- Peter Blauner (born 1959), author, journalist and television producer
- Howard Bloom (born 1943), publicist and author
- Charles M. Blow (born 1970), columnist for The New York Times
- Helen Boyd (born 1969), author of two books about her relationship with her transgender partner
- Arthur Bradford (born 1969), writer and filmmaker
- Jane Brody (born 1941), author on science and nutrition topics
- Bruce Brooks (born 1950), writer of young adult and children's literature
- Rudolph Delson (born 1975), author best known for his 2007 debut novel, Maynard and Jennica
- Andrea Dworkin (1946–2005), radical feminist and writer best known for her criticism of pornography
- Dave Eggers (born 1970), author of A Heartbreaking Work of Staggering Genius
- Jennie Fields (born 1953), novelist
- Jonathan Safran Foer (born 1977), author whose novels include Extremely Loud & Incredibly Close
- Rozanne Gold, chef, journalist and cookbook author
- Ben Greenman (born 1969), novelist, author and magazine journalist
- Pete Hamill (1935–2020), journalist who was a columnist and editor for the New York Post and New York Daily News
- Colin Harrison (born 1960), author whose books include Manhattan Nocturne
- Kathryn Harrison (born 1961), author
- John Hodgman (born 1971), author, actor and humorist
- Siri Hustvedt (born 1955), novelist and essayist who wrote The Sorrows of an American
- Steven Johnson (born 1968), author
- Norton Juster (1929–2021), writer
- Lindsey Kelk, chick lit author and journalist
- Jim Knipfel (born 1965), novelist and journalist
- Nicole Krauss (born 1974), author of Man Walks Into a Room, The History of Love and Great House
- Jhumpa Lahiri (born 1967), author whose story collection Interpreter of Maladies (1999) won the 2000 Pulitzer Prize for Fiction
- Jonathan Lethem (born 1964), novelist
- Clifford J. Levy
- Laura Jean Libbey (1862-1924), author of dime novels
- Michael Patrick MacDonald (born 1966), anti-crime activist
- Daisy Martinez, actress and author
- Rick Moody (born 1961), novelist
- Mary Morris (born 1947), author and professor at Sarah Lawrence College
- Itamar Moses (born 1977), playwright, author and television writer
- Melissa Holbrook Pierson (born 1957), writer and essayist of non-fiction
- Robert Reuland (born 1963), writer and criminal lawyer
- Adam Roberts (stage name Amateur Gourmet), food and humor writer
- Elizabeth Royte, writer
- Lucy Sante (born 1954), writer and critic
- Brian Selznick (born 1966), illustrator and writer
- Jon Scieszka (born 1954), children's writer
- David Shenk, writer and filmmaker
- Marilyn Singer (born 1948), children's writer
- Amy Sohn, author, columnist and screenwriter
- John Stoltenberg (born 1944), magazine editor
- Darin Strauss (born 1970), writer
- Penelope Trunk (born 1966), author, blogger and entrepreneur
- Elisabeth Vincentelli, French-born arts and culture journalist
- Ned Vizzini (1981–2013), novelist
- Brian Wood (born 1972), comic book creator
- Jacqueline Woodson (born 1963), writer
- William Upski Wimsatt (born 1972), author and political activist

Politicians

- Carol Bellamy (born 1942), former New York state senator and New York City Council president
- James F. Brennan (born 1952), former New York State Assembly member.
- Hugh Carey (1919–2011), former governor of New York and U.S. representative
- Robert Carroll, New York State Assembly member
- Bill de Blasio (born 1961), former New York City mayor
- Francis Edwin Dorn, former U.S. representative
- Helen Gahagan Douglas, actress and former U.S. representative
- Patrick Gaspard, diplomat
- William Jay Gaynor, former New York City mayor
- Chris Hayes, journalist
- Brad Lander, New York City Council member
- Marty Markowitz, former New York state senator and Brooklyn borough president
- Chirlane McCray, writer and activist, married to Bill de Blasio
- Max Rose (born 1986), U.S. representative from 2019 to 2021
- Gene Russianoff, attorney and chief spokesman for the Straphangers Campaign
- Chuck Schumer, U.S. senator, former U.S. representative
- Anthony Weiner, former U.S. representative

Others

- Al Capone, criminal
- Fabiano Caruana, chess player
- Romilly Newman, chef
- Henry Petroski (1942–2023), engineer specializing in failure analysis

== See also ==
- Streetcar suburb
