= Adam Ottavino =

American baseball player (born 1985)

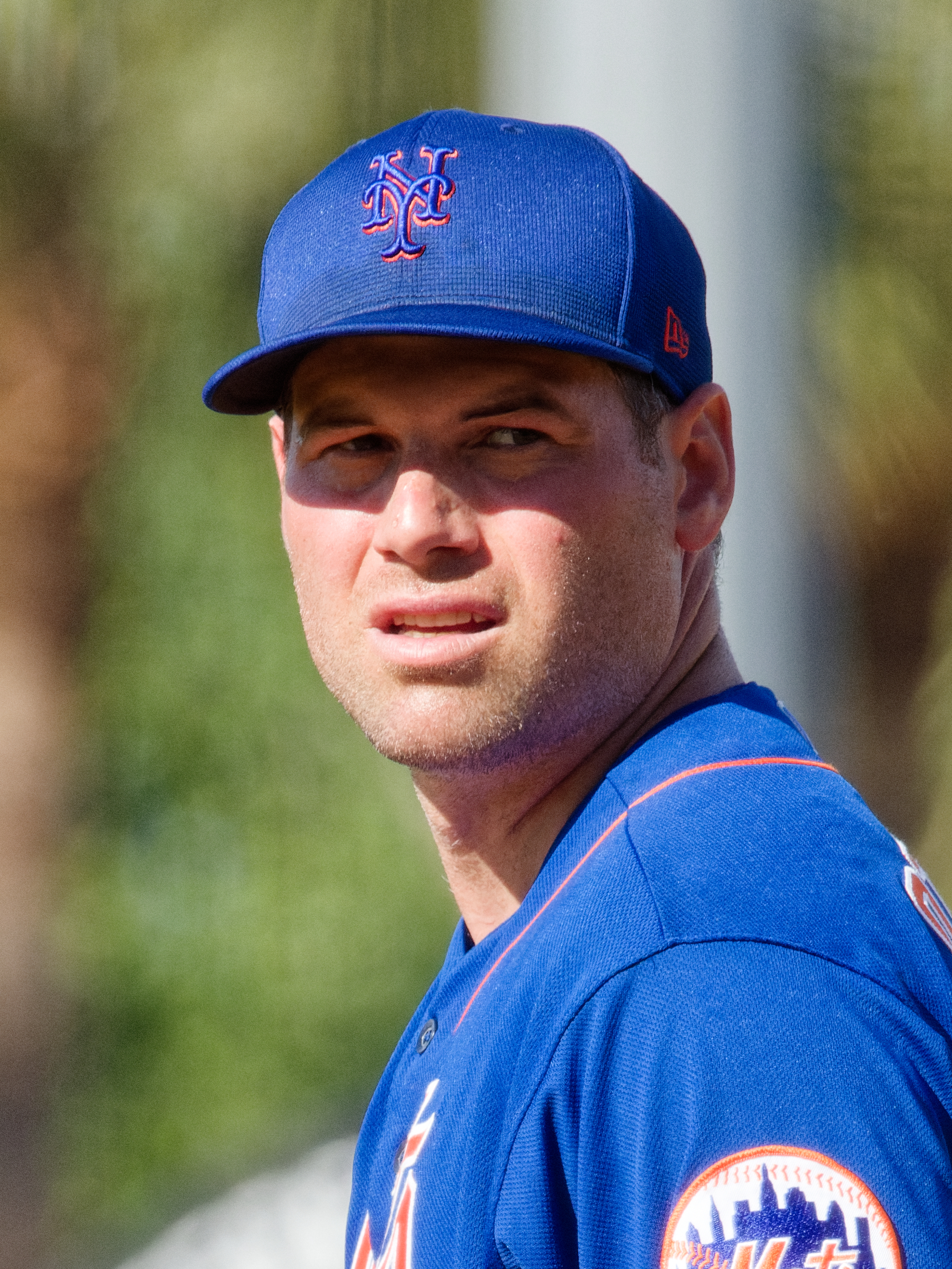
- Ottavino with the Mets in 2023
- Pitcher
- Born: November 22, 1985 (age 40); Manhattan, New York, U.S.
- Batted: Switch Threw: Right

MLB debut
- May 29, 2010, for the St. Louis Cardinals

Last MLB appearance
- April 7, 2025, for the New York Yankees

MLB statistics
- Win–loss record: 41–43
- Earned run average: 3.48
- Strikeouts: 862
- Stats at Baseball Reference

Teams
- St. Louis Cardinals (2010); Colorado Rockies (2012–2018); New York Yankees (2019–2020); Boston Red Sox (2021); New York Mets (2022–2024); New York Yankees (2025)
Medals
Men's baseball
Representing United States
World Baseball Classic
| Silver medal – second place | 2023 Miami | Team |

Adam Robert Ottavino (born November 22, 1985) is an American former professional baseball pitcher. He played in Major League Baseball (MLB) for the St. Louis Cardinals, Colorado Rockies, New York Yankees, Boston Red Sox, and New York Mets from 2010 to 2025. Listed at 6 feet 5 inches (1.96 m) and 246 pounds (112 kg), he throws right-handed and is a switch hitter.

== Early life and education ==
A native of New York City, Ottavino was born in Manhattan and moved to Brooklyn when he was three years old. He attended elementary school at P.S. 39, The Henry Bristow School in the Park Slope neighborhood of Brooklyn, junior high school at I.S. 240 Andries Hudde and graduated from the Berkeley Carroll School in Park Slope in 2003. He played in a summer developmental league with future teammate Dellin Betances, who was a couple of grades younger. The Tampa Bay Devil Rays selected Ottavino in the 30th round of the 2003 MLB draft, but he did not sign.

Ottavino enrolled at Northeastern University, where he played college baseball for the Northeastern Huskies baseball team. Ottavino holds both the Northeastern career and single season records for strikeouts. In 2005, he was named America East Conference's Pitcher of the Year. After the 2005 season, he played collegiate summer baseball with the Harwich Mariners of the Cape Cod Baseball League.

== Professional career ==
=== St. Louis Cardinals ===
The St. Louis Cardinals selected Ottavino out of Northeastern University in the first round, with the 30th overall selection of the 2006 MLB draft. That year, he pitched for the Swing of the Quad Cities of the Class A Midwest League. He pitched for the Springfield Cardinals of the Class AA Texas League in 2008. In 2009, Ottavino pitched for the Memphis Redbirds of the Class AAA Pacific Coast League (PCL). He had an 0–9 win–loss record in the first half of the season, but had a 7–3 record in the second half.

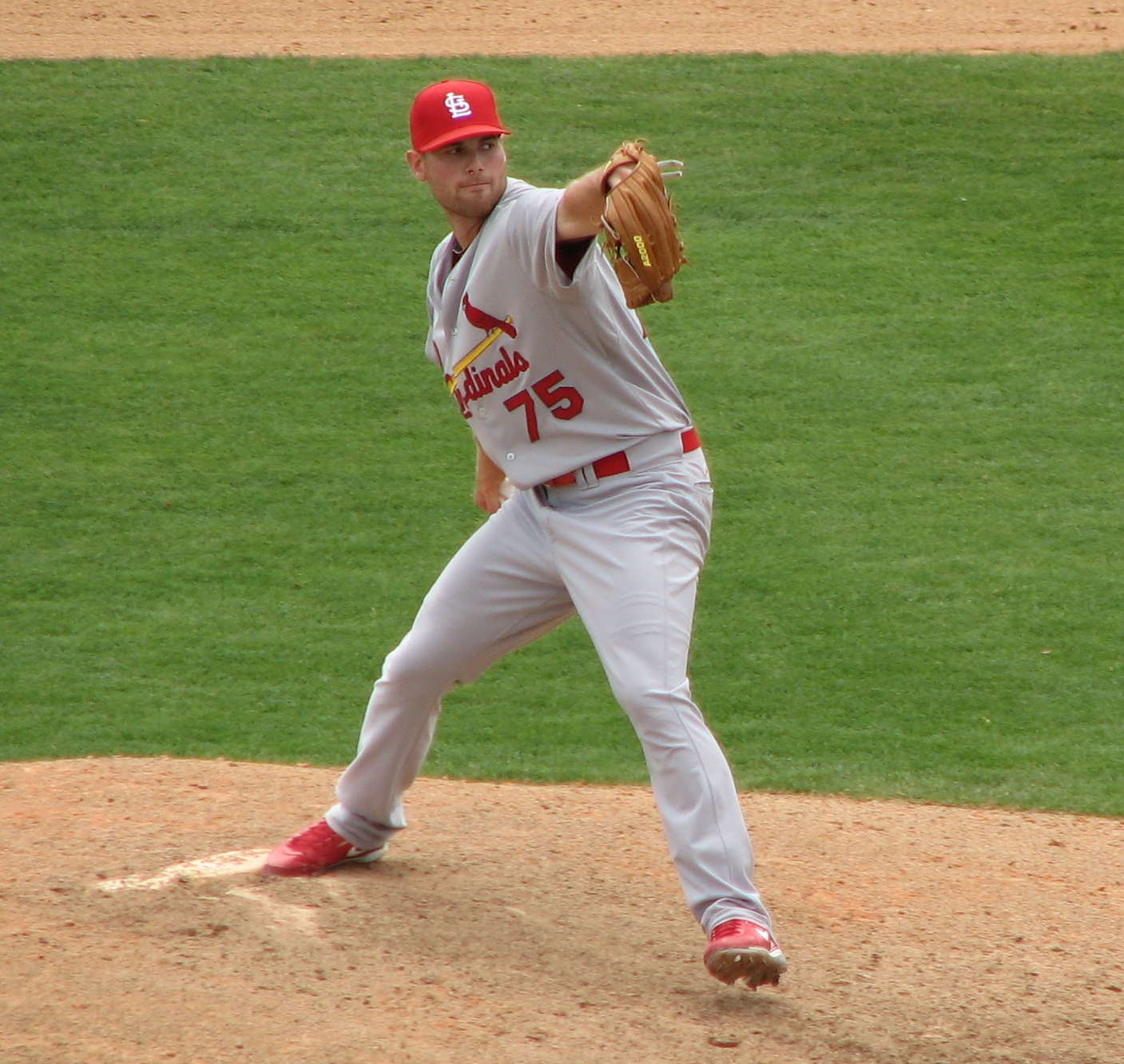
Ottavino with the Cardinals in 2010

After the 2009 season, the Cardinals added Ottavino to their 40-man roster. He began the 2010 season with Memphis. On May 29, 2010, Ottavino made his major league debut for the Cardinals as a starter. He appeared in five games for the Cardinals in 2010, three of them starts. After the 2010 season, the Cardinals outrighted Ottavino off of their 40-man roster. He pitched for Memphis in 2011, and the Cardinals re-added him to their 40-man roster after the season.

=== Colorado Rockies ===
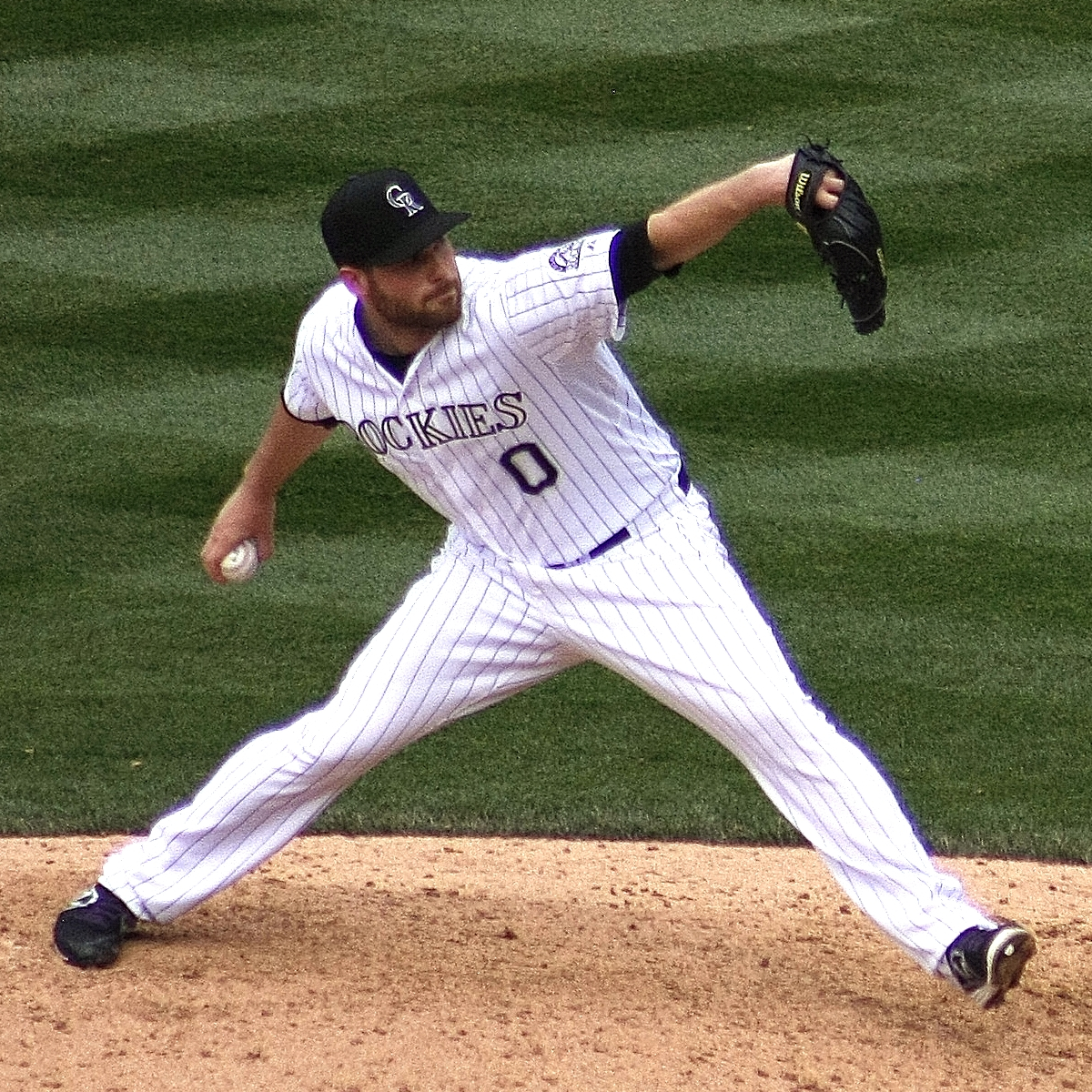
Ottavino with the Rockies in 2014

On April 3, 2012, the Colorado Rockies claimed Ottavino off of waivers. The Rockies assigned him to the Colorado Springs Sky Sox of the PCL. They promoted him to the majors later that season, and developed him into a relief pitcher.

In 2013, Ottavino switched his uniform number to 0. Despite posting a 5–1 win–loss record, his earned run average (ERA) was close to 5.00 in 79 innings. In 2013, Ottavino appeared in 51 games, pitching in 78.1 innings and lowering his ERA from the previous season by two runs, registering an ERA of 2.64 for the Rockies. In 2014, Ottavino went 1–4 with a 3.60 ERA in a career high 75 games.

After closer LaTroy Hawkins struggled to open the 2015 season, Ottavino was named the new closer. On May 4, 2015, it was revealed that Ottavino had a partially torn ulnar collateral ligament in his right elbow, which required Tommy John surgery, ending his 2015 season.

After the 2015 season, the Rockies and Ottavino agreed on a three-year contract worth $10.4 million. Ottavino began the 2016 season on the disabled list. After returning, he completed 37 scoreless appearances, in 31 innings pitched, which set a Rockies' franchise record. In 2018, he was 6–4 with a 2.34 ERA, and shared the major league lead in holds, with 34.

Following the 2017 season, Ottavino rented a vacant storefront on St. Nicholas Avenue in Harlem from his father-in-law which he converted into a pitching lab. In the lab, he and other local players at lower levels of the sport used technology and data to develop pitches and hone their craft.

=== New York Yankees ===
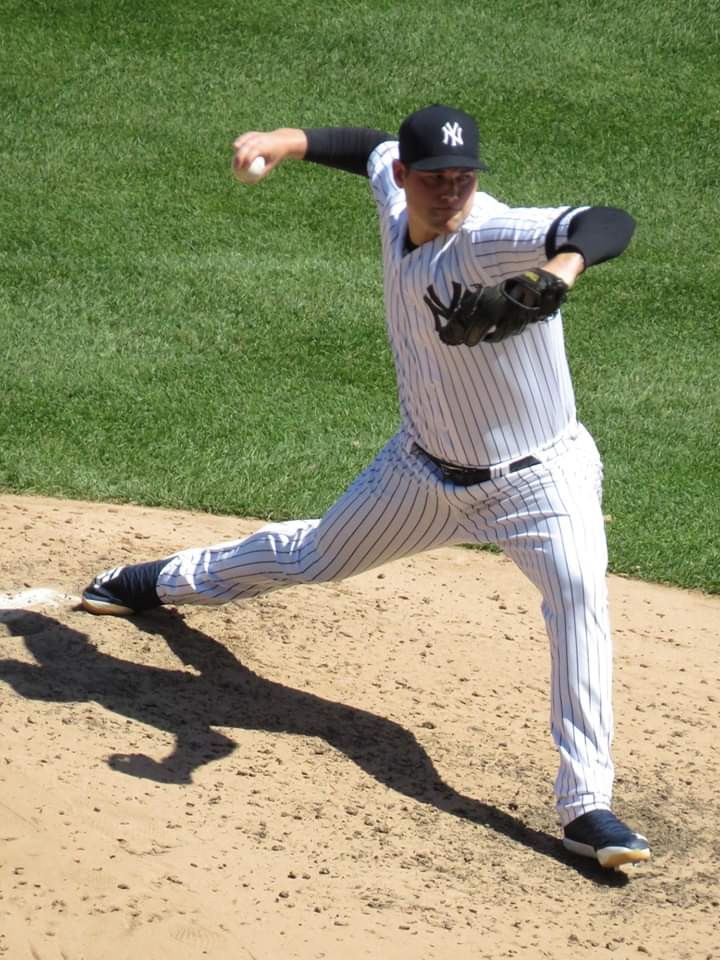
Ottavino with the Yankees in 2019

On January 24, 2019, the New York Yankees signed Ottavino to a three-year contract worth $27 million. Ottavino became the first Yankee in team history to wear uniform number 0, the last single-digit number not retired by the Yankees. During the 2019 season, Ottavino appeared in 73 games for the Yankees, all in relief, pitching to a 6–5 record with 1.90 ERA and 88 strikeouts in 66 1/3 innings pitched. During the shortened 2020 season, he made 24 appearances, all in relief, with a 5.89 ERA and 2–3 record with 25 strikeouts in 18 1/3 innings pitched.

=== Boston Red Sox ===
On January 25, 2021, the Yankees traded Ottavino and minor league pitcher Frank German to the Boston Red Sox for cash considerations or a player to be named later; it was only the second trade between the rivals since 1987. During the regular season, Ottavino made 69 appearances for Boston, all in relief, compiling a 7–3 record with 11 saves and 4.21 ERA. He struck out 71 batters in 62 innings. In the postseason, he made five relief appearances, allowing one run in four innings, as the Red Sox advanced to the American League Championship Series. On November 3, Ottavino elected to become a free agent.

=== New York Mets ===
On March 14, 2022, Ottavino signed a one-year, $4 million contract with the New York Mets. During the regular season, he made 66 appearances for the Mets, compiling a 6–3 record with three saves and a 2.06 ERA, striking out 79 batters across 65^{2}/_{3} innings pitched. In his lone postseason appearance, he allowed one run in one inning pitched during Game 2 of the National League Wild Card Series against the San Diego Padres. The Mets lost the series the next night.

On December 20, 2022, Ottavino re-signed with the Mets on a two-year, $14.5 million contract including an opt-out after the 2023 season. In 66 games for New York in 2023, he posted a 3.21 ERA with 62 strikeouts across 61^{2}/_{3} innings pitched. On November 6, 2023, Ottavino opted out of his contract and became a free agent.

On January 30, 2024, the Mets re-signed him again to a one-year, $4.5 million contract. Across 60 games for the Mets in 2024, Ottavino posted a 4.34 ERA with 70 strikeouts in 56 innings pitched. He was removed from the NLCS against the Los Angeles Dodgers and replaced on the roster by Jeff McNeil. Ottavino became a free agent after the season.

=== New York Yankees (second stint) ===
On February 18, 2025, Ottavino signed a minor league contract with the Red Sox. He was released by the team after triggering an opt-out clause in his contract on March 23.

Ottavino signed a major league contract with the Yankees on April 1. After two scoreless appearances, he was designated for assignment by the team on April 4. Ottavino elected free agency on April 6, but re-signed with the Yankees on a new major league contract the following day. On April 8, Ottavino was designated for assignment by the Yankees again. After clearing waivers, Ottavino again elected free agency on April 10.

== Broadcasting career ==
As of the 2026 Major League Baseball season, Ottavino is serving on the YES Network for pre and postgame coverage of New York Yankees games.

On April 1, 2026, Ottavino joined ESPN as an MLB analyst.

== Personal life ==
During his first season with the Yankees, Ottavino resided in his childhood neighborhood of Park Slope in Brooklyn, New York City, with his wife, Brette, and their two daughters and son. They currently live in Dyker Heights, Brooklyn.
