= Park Slope Volunteer Ambulance Corps =

Volunteer emergency medical service

Park Slope Volunteer Ambulance Corps (PSVAC)
- Established: 1992
- Headquarters: Park Slope, New York City
- Jurisdiction: Brooklyn, NY
- Employees: 90 Volunteers
- BLS or ALS: BLS
- Ambulances: 4
- Fly-cars: 1 Utility Vehicle, 3 Bicycles
- Chief: Louis Greco
- Website: psvac.org/home

The Park Slope Volunteer Ambulance Corps, or PSVAC, is a community organization that provides emergency medical response, rescue operations, patient assessment, treatment, and transport in Park Slope, Brooklyn, New York. Since 1992, members have responded to over ten thousand calls for help.

== Mission ==
PSVAC's mission is to:

- Provide emergency medical response, rescue operations, patient assessment, treatment, and transport, regardless of ability to pay
- Provide placement, educational and event services to members of the community

== History ==
The Park Slope Volunteer Ambulance Corps was founded by members of the Park Slope community in 1992, in response to a scarcity of EMS resources and increased call-times.

PSVAC has won recognition including numerous awards

Today, the Park Slope Volunteer Ambulance Corps has over 90 active members, including 20 crew chiefs. PSVAC has three type-III ambulances, one type-II, patrol bicycles, and a first-response fly car. PSVAC responds to thousands of calls every year, resulting in treating and/or transporting over seven hundred patients.

PSVAC is a participating member of the Fire Department of New York (FDNY)'s NYC 911 system.

== Membership ==
The corps is composed of unpaid volunteers who donate their time and a wide range of skills and experience. Members who work on PSVAC's ambulances are all trained medical personnel, capable of handling a wide range of emergency situations.

Members come from all walks of life. Some are medical professionals, such as emergency medical technicians (EMT-Bs), paramedics, doctors, etc. Others work in finance, law enforcement, construction, education, business, or are self-employed.

Most members are New York State certified EMT-Bs and work on the ambulances. Other members serve as dispatchers, instructors, manage membership recruitment and perform other support functions.
