= Public School 39 =

School building in Brooklyn, New York

- U.S. National Register of Historic Places
- New York State Register of Historic Places
- New York City Landmark
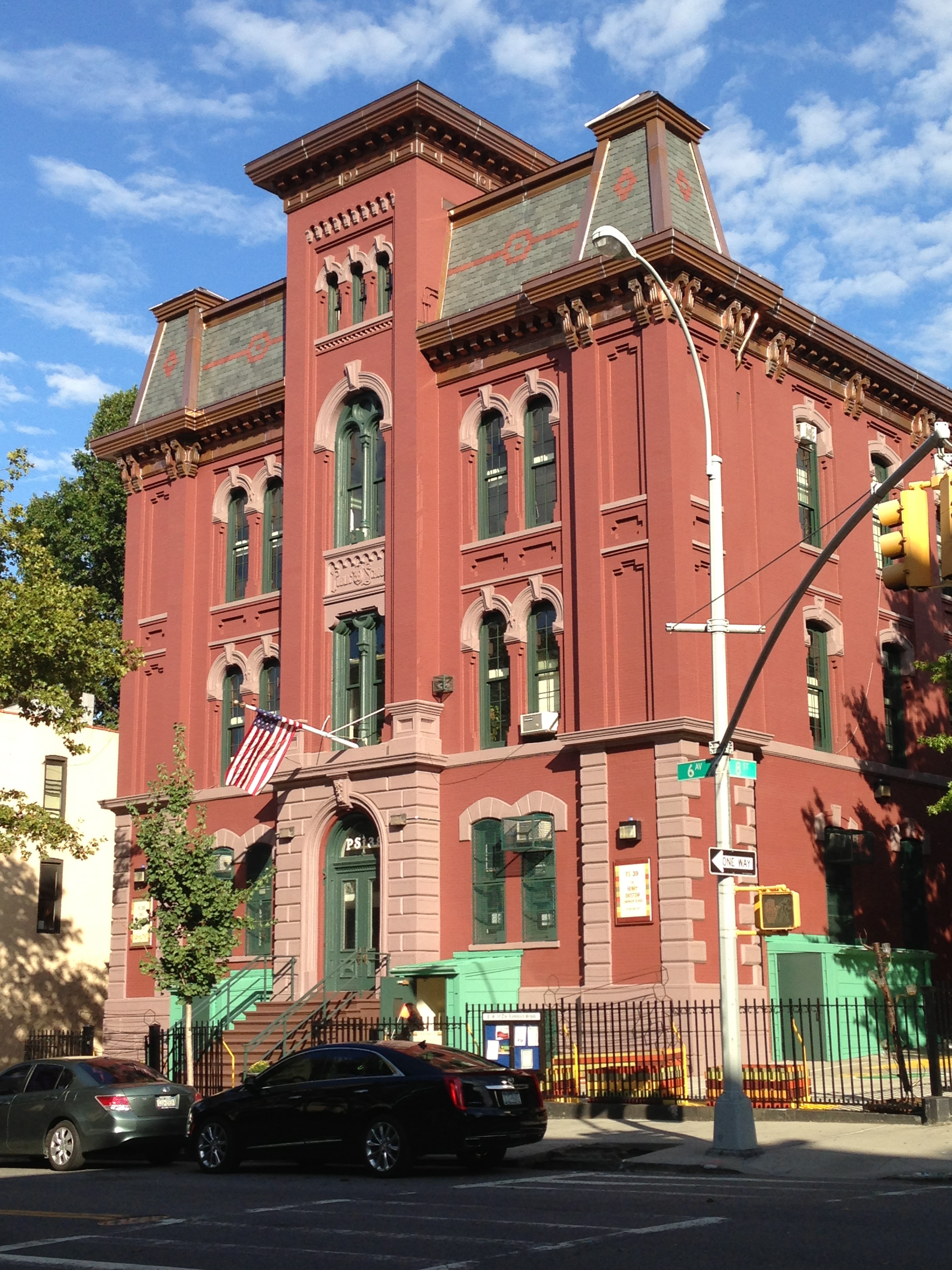

- Location within New York City Location within New York Location within the United States
- Location: 417 6th Ave., New York, New York
- Coordinates: 40°40′7″N 73°58′58″W
- Area: less than one acre
- Built: 1876
- Architects: Leonard, Samuel B.
- Architectural style: Second Empire, Italianate
- NRHP reference No.: 80002646
- NYSRHP No.: 04701.000164
- NYCL No.: 0952

Significant dates
- Added to NRHP: April 17, 1980
- Designated NYSRHP: December 23, 2015
- Designated NYCL: March 8, 1977

Public School 39, also known as PS 39 The Henry Bristow School, is a historic school building located in the Park Slope section of Brooklyn, New York City. It is a part of the New York City Department of Education.

It was built in 1876-1877 and is a three-story symmetrical brick and stone building combining features of the Italianate and Second Empire styles. The main facade features a central bay or tower with a rusticated first floor. The building has steep slate covered mansard roofs.

It was listed on the National Register of Historic Places in 1980.

Notable graduates include pitcher Adam Ottavino and politician Anthony Weiner.
