= Rudolph Delson =

American author

- Born: 1975 (age 50–51); San Jose, California, U.S.
- Education: Stanford University (BA, BS); New York University School of Law (JD)
- Occupation: Novelist
- Writing career
- Genre: fiction
- Website: www.rudolphdelson.com

Rudolph Delson (born March 26, 1975) is an American author best known for his 2007 debut novel, Maynard and Jennica, published by Houghton Mifflin. Maynard and Jennica is a modern love story set in New York City.

Rudolph Delson was born and raised in San Jose, California, and his mother was a sculptor and his father an engineer. While growing up, he made a living as a litigation associate at the law firm of Simpson Thacher & Bartlett LLP, a paralegal at the Antitrust Division of the United States Department of Justice, and as a law clerk for James R. Browning of the United States Court of Appeals. He now lives in Brooklyn, New York. He graduated from Stanford University (BA & BS, 1997) and NYU Law School (JD, 2002).

While at NYU Delson was a member of the NYU Law Review, as a Notes Editor. His mother is now a real estate agent, and his father is retired.
