= General Bernardo O'Higgins Airport =

- IATA: YAI; ICAO: SCCH

Summary
- Airport type: Public
- Owner: Estado de Chile
- Operator: Director General of Civil Aeronautics
- Serves: Chillán, Chile
- Elevation AMSL: 499 ft / 152 m
- Coordinates: 36°35′00″S 72°01′57″W
- Website: www.chillanaereo.cl

Map
- Location of Aeropuerto General Bernardo O'Higgins in Chile

Runways
Direction	Length		Surface
Direction	m	ft	Surface
04/22	1,750	5,740	Asphalt
- Sources: GCM SkyVector

General Bernardo O'Higgins Airport (IATA: YAI, ICAO: SCCH) is an airport serving Chillán, a city in the Diguillín Province of Chile's Ñuble Region. The airport is 6 kilometres (3.7 mi) northeast of the city.

The airport is named for Bernardo O'Higgins, the first Chilean head of state.

== See also ==
- Transport in Chile
- List of airports in Chile
