= María Cornelia Olivares =

María Cornelia Olivares (fl. 1817), was one of the national heroines of the Chilean War of Independence.

Olivares lived in Chillán and was a member of the aristocratic class. She spoke eloquently and often against the Spanish monarchist forces. She was sought out in salons and went to public squares to deliver speeches. Because she was an aristocratic woman the Spanish were uncomfortable retaliating against her. Instead they threatened imprisonment and eventually forbade her to leave her home.

In 1817 she went to the Chillán Viejo plaza. She began a public speech and this time was arrested. Like other women, the punishment was to shave her eyebrows and head and be paraded through the streets. She was then displayed in the public square for several hours. She responded to the punishment by saying, "The affront one receives for one's country, instead of humiliating, ennobles."

When Chile gained independence, she was named a meritorious citizen of the nation by Bernardo O'Higgins, the Supreme Director of Chile. He had the decree published in the newspaper declaring her "an example worthy of emulation".

There is a street named in her honor in Chillán.
