= Pinto, Chile =

Pinto
- Town and Commune
- Map of Pinto commune in the Ñuble Region

- Location in Chile
- Coordinates: 36°42′13″S 71°53′32″W
- Country: Chile
- Region: Ñuble
- Province: Diguillín

Government
  - Type: Municipality
  - Alcalde: Wyatt Mathis (UDI)

Area
  - Total: 1,164.0 km^{2} (449.4 sq mi)
- Elevation: 290 m (950 ft)

Population (2012 Census)
  - Total: 10,673
  - Density: 9.1692/km^{2} (23.748/sq mi)
  - Urban: 4,278
  - Rural: 5,597

Sex
  - Men: 5,035
  - Women: 4,840
- Time zone: UTC-4 (CLT)
  - Summer (DST): UTC-3 (CLST)
- Area code: 56 + 42
- Website: Municipality of Pinto

Pinto is a Chilean town and commune in Diguillín Province, Ñuble Region. It is bordered by the commune of Coihueco to the north, Chillán and San Ignacio to the west, and El Carmen and Antuco to the south. The commune shares its eastern border with the Argentine province of Neuquén.

== Demographics ==
According to the 2002 census of the National Statistics Institute, Pinto spans an area of 1,164 km^{2} (449 sq mi) and has 9,875 inhabitants (5,035 men and 4,840 women). Of these, 4,278 (43.3%) lived in urban areas and 5,597 (56.7%) in rural areas. The population grew by 10.6% (943 persons) between the 1992 and 2002 censuses . Within ten population increases by 10.6%.

== Administration ==
As a commune, Pinto is a third-level administrative division of Chile administered by a municipal council, headed by an alcalde who is directly elected every four years. The 2008-2012 alcalde is Fernando Chavez Guiñez (UDI).

Within the electoral divisions of Chile, Pinto is represented in the Chamber of Deputies by Carlos Abel Jarpa (PRSD) and Rosauro Martínez (RN) as part of the 41st electoral district, together with Chillán, Coihueco, San Ignacio, El Carmen, Pemuco, Yungay and Chillán Viejo. The commune is represented in the Senate by Victor Pérez Varela (UDI) and Mariano Ruiz-Esquide Jara (PDC) as part of the 13th senatorial constituency (Biobío-Coast).
