= San Ignacio, Chile =

San Ignacio
- Commune
- Coat of arms

- Location of San Ignacio commune in the Ñuble Region

- Location in Chile
- Coordinates: 36°32′S 72°26′W
- Country: Chile
- Region: Ñuble
- Province: Diguillín

Government
  - Type: Municipalities of Vhild
  - Alcalde: Nelson Aedo Figueroa (UDI)

Area
  - Total: 363.6 km^{2} (140.4 sq mi)
- Elevation: 132 m (433 ft)

Population (2012 Census)
  - Total: 15,566
  - Density: 42.81/km^{2} (110.9/sq mi)
  - Urban: 4,873
  - Rural: 11,233
- Demonym: Sanignacino

Sex
  - Men: 8,192
  - Women: 7,914
- Time zone: UTC-4 (CLT)
  - Summer (DST): UTC-3 (CLST)
- Area code: 56 + 42

San Ignacio (Spanish pronunciation: [san iɣˈnasjo]) is a Chilean town and commune in Diguillín Province, Ñuble Region. It has an area of 363.6 km^{2} (140 sq mi).

== Demographics ==
According to data from the 2002 Census of Population and Housing, San Ignacio had 16,106 inhabitants; of these, 4,873 (30.3%) lived in urban areas and 11,233 (69.7%) in rural areas. At that time, there were 8,192 men and 7,914 women. Sanignacino is the demonym for a man, and Sanignacina is that of a woman.

== Administration ==
As a commune, San Ignacio is a third-level administrative division of Chile administered by a municipal council, headed by an alcalde who is directly elected every four years.

Within the electoral divisions of Chile, San Ignacio is represented in the Chamber of Deputies as a part of the 41st electoral district (together with Chillán, Coihueco, Pinto, El Carmen, Pemuco, Yungay and Chillán Viejo). The commune is represented in the Senate

== See also ==
- List of towns in Chile
