= Yungay, Chile =

Yungay
- Commune
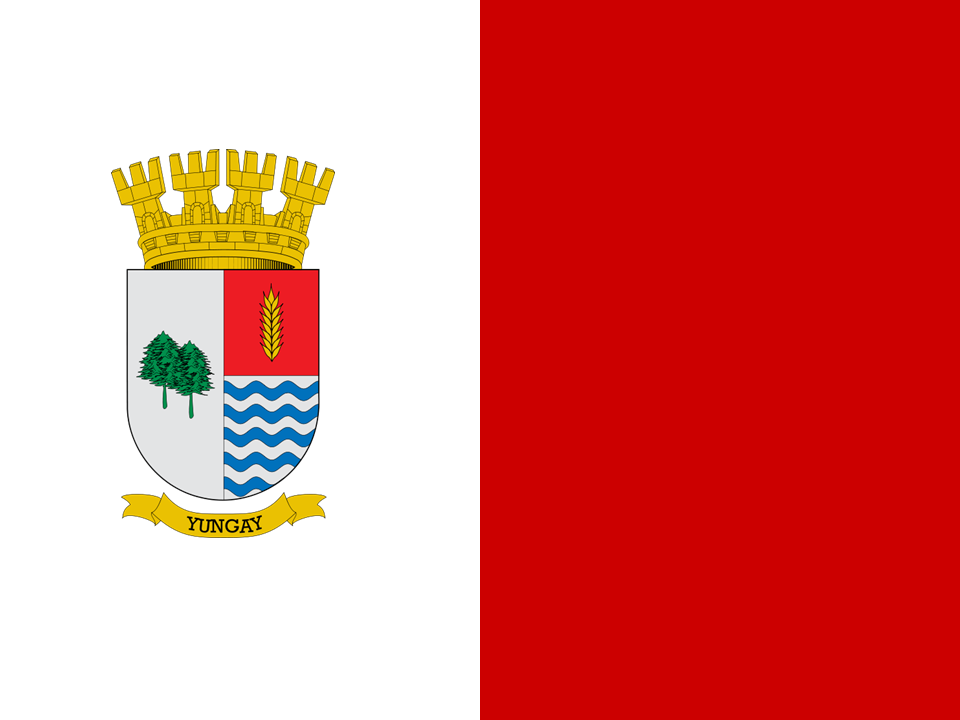
- Flag Coat of arms

- Map of the Yungay commune in the Ñuble Region

- Location in Chile
- Coordinates: 37°07′11″S 72°01′09″W
- Country: Chile
- Region: Ñuble
- Province: Diguillín
- Villa de Yungay: 20 January 1842

Government
  - Type: Municipality
  - Alcalde: Angel Castro Medina (PDC)

Area
  - Total: 823.5 km^{2} (318.0 sq mi)
- Elevation: 268 m (879 ft)

Population (2012 Census)
  - Total: 16,949
  - Density: 20.58/km^{2} (53.31/sq mi)
  - Urban: 11,469
  - Rural: 5,345

Sex
  - Men: 8565
  - Women: 8249
- Time zone: UTC−4 (CLT)
  - Summer (DST): UTC−3 (CLST)
- Area code: 56 + 42
- Climate: Csb
- Website: Municipality of Yungay

Yungay is a Chilean town and commune in Diguillín Province, Ñuble Region. The commune spans an area of 823.5 km (512 mi).

== Demographics ==
According to data from the 2002 Census of Population and Housing, the Yungay commune had 16,814 inhabitants; of these, 11,469 (68.2%) lived in urban areas and 5,345 (31.8%) in rural areas. At that time, there were 8,565 men and 8,249 women residing in the commune. The commune grew 10% in population between the censuses of 1992 and 2002 (1.0% annual growth).

== Towns ==
The following are the towns that made up the commune as with their respective populations (according to the 2002 Census):

- Yungay, commune seat, 9288 inhabitants
- Campanario, 2181 inhabitants
- Cholguán, 718 inhabitants
- Ranchillo, 319 inhabitants
- El Roble, 152 inhabitants
- Los Castaños, 142 inhabitants
- Chillancito, 62 inhabitants

== Administration ==
As a commune, Yungay is a third-level administrative division of Chile administered by a municipal council, headed by an alcalde who is directly elected every four years. For the years 2016-2020, the alcalde is Rafael Cifuentes Rodríguez (PS), and the council members are:

- Juana Sandoval Rojas (PDC)
- Rodrigo Stuardo Hernández (PRSD)
- Ángelica Cabezas González (UDI)
- Juan Quezada Garrido (ILH)
- Ricardo Ramos Martínez (Ind.-PS)
- Patricia Moncada Morales (PRSD)

Within the electoral divisions of Chile, Yungay (together with Chillán, Coihueco, Pinto, San Ignacio, Chile, El Carmen, Pemuco and Chillán Viejo) is represented in the Chamber of Deputies as a part of the 41st electoral district. The commune is represented in the Senate as part of the 13th senatorial constituency (Biobío Coast).

== Geography ==
Even though the total area of the commune is around 823 km squared, only 3.87 km squared (0.47% of the total territory) has been urbanized: the cities of Yungay (with 9,288 inhabitants as of 2002) and Campanario. In the 2017 census there were 17,787 total inhabitants in the commune. The Yungay Commune is located on the eastern borders of the region, thus it contains parts of the Cordillera of the Andes, where the altitude reaches between 150 and 2000 meters above sea level. Several rivers flow out of the Andes sector and cross the body of the region. Generally, the land is devoted to agricultural purposes, principally the growth of California Pine, wheat, oats, or lentils; or for livestock grazing.

== Library ==
The Yungay Public Library is named after the priest Oreste Montero, who was a great aid for the education in Yungay and left an impression on many generations through his positive nature. In the present day, the library has grown and offers many new services such as a computer lab that serves many students (from one of the several high schools within the area) who don’t have access to the necessary resources

== See also ==
- List of towns in Chile
