= Pemuco =

- Town and Commune
- Coat of arms Location of the Pemuco commune in the Ñuble Region Location in Chile
- Coordinates: 36°58′37″S 72°05′56″W
- Country: Chile
- Region: Ñuble
- Province: Diguillín

Government
  - Type: Municipality
  - Alcalde: Julio Muñoz Salazar (PDC)

Area
  - Total: 562.7 km^{2} (217.3 sq mi)
- Elevation: 182 m (597 ft)

Population (2012 Census)
  - Total: 8,300
  - Density: 15/km^{2} (38/sq mi)
  - Urban: 3,844
  - Rural: 4,977

Sex
  - Men: 4,578
  - Women: 4,243
- Time zone: UTC-4 (CLT)
  - Summer (DST): UTC-3 (CLST)
- Area code: country 56 + city 42
- Website: www.munipemuco.cl

Pemuco is a Chilean town and commune in Diguillín Province, Ñuble Region.

== Demographics ==
According to the 2002 census of the National Statistics Institute, Pemuco spans an area of 562.7 km^{2} (217 sq mi) and has 8,821 inhabitants (4,578 men and 4,243 women). Of these, 3,844 (43.6%) lived in urban areas and 4,977 (56.4%) in rural areas. The population grew by 4.8% (408 persons) between the 1992 and 2002 censuses.

== Administration ==
As a commune, Pemuco is a third-level administrative division of Chile administered by a municipal council, headed by an alcalde who is directly elected every four years. The 2008-2012 alcalde is Julio Muñoz Salazar (PDC).

Within the electoral divisions of Chile, Pemuco is represented in the Chamber of Deputies by Carlos Abel Jarpa (PRSD) and Rosauro Martínez (RN) as part of the 41st electoral district, together with Chillán, Coihueco, Pinto, San Ignacio, El Carmen, Yungay and Chillán Viejo. The commune is represented in the Senate by Victor Pérez Varela (UDI) and Mariano Ruiz-Esquide Jara (PDC) as part of the 13th senatorial constituency (Biobío-Coast).
