= El Carmen, Chile =

El Carmen
- Town and Commune
- Map of the commune of El Carmen in the Ñuble Region

- Location in Chile
- Coordinates: 36°53′53″S 72°01′35″W
- Country: Chile
- Region: Ñuble
- Province: Diguillín

Government
  - Type: Municipality
  - Alcalde: Renan Cabezas (Ind.)

Area
  - Total: 664.3 km^{2} (256.5 sq mi)
- Elevation: 224 m (735 ft)

Population (2012 Census)
  - Total: 12,277
  - Density: 18.48/km^{2} (47.87/sq mi)
  - Urban: 4,426
  - Rural: 8,419

Sex
  - Men: 6,567
  - Women: 6,278
- Time zone: UTC-4 (CLT)
  - Summer (DST): UTC-3 (CLST)
- Area code: 56 + 42
- Website: Municipality of El Carmen

El Carmen is a Chilean commune and town in Diguillín Province, Ñuble Region.

== Demographics ==
According to the 2002 census of the National Statistics Institute, El Carmen spans an area of 664.3 km^{2} (256 sq mi) and has 12,845 inhabitants (6,567 men and 6,278 women). Of these, 4,426 (34.5%) lived in urban areas and 8,419 (65.5%) in rural areas. The population fell by 9.3% (1316 persons) between the 1992 and 2002 censuses.

== Administration ==
As a commune, El Carmen is a third-level administrative division of Chile administered by a municipal council, headed by an alcalde who is directly elected every four years. The 2024-2028 alcalde is Renan Cabezas

Within the electoral divisions of Chile, El Carmen is represented in the Chamber of Deputies by Carlos Abel Jarpa (PRSD) and Rosauro Martínez (RN) as part of the 41st electoral district, together with Chillán, Coihueco, Pinto, San Ignacio, Pemuco, Yungay and Chillán Viejo. The commune is represented in the Senate by Victor Pérez Varela (UDI) and Mariano Ruiz-Esquide Jara (PDC) as part of the 13th senatorial constituency (Biobío-Coast).
