= St. Bartholomew Cathedral, Chillán =

Coordinates: 36.6069°S 72.1021°W

St. Bartholomew Cathedral
- Catedral de Chillán
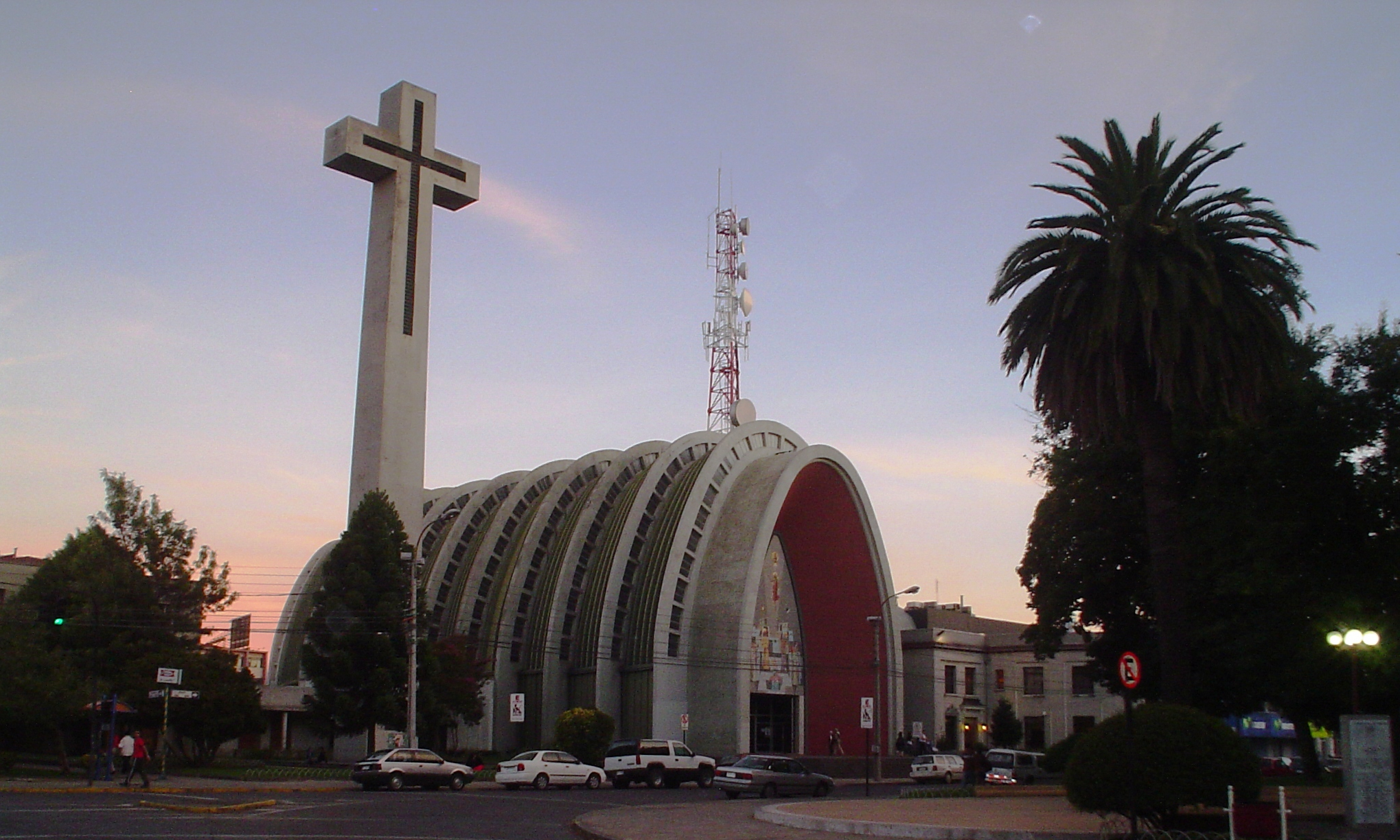
- St. Bartholomew Cathedral
- Location: Chillán
- Country: Chile
- Denomination: Roman Catholic Church

The St. Bartholomew Cathedral (Spanish: Catedral de San Bartolomé) Also Chillán Cathedral Is a temple of the Catholic Church, home of the Diocese of Chillán located in the center of the city of Chillán, Chile in front of the Plaza de Armas, in the corner of streets Arauco and Libertad. It is also a symbol and icon of the city, as a result of the city's progress after the Chillan earthquake of 1939. It was declared a National Monument in December 2014.

The first cathedral of the city of Chillán was established in what today is known as Old Chillán, but this one was destroyed after the earthquake that affected the zone in 1835. As a result, the city was devastated and was transferred and reconstructed in Its current location. The cathedral at that time was made of lime and brick.

After the Chillán earthquake of 1939, the cathedral was completely destroyed again, beginning that same year the reconstructions that culminated in 1950. In this new reconstruction, the architect Hernán Larraín Errázuriz was based on ideas of modernism. The figure of the 10 arches represent the prayer and the sign that is made with the hands at the moment of praying intercalando the fingers of the hands and closing them of oval form.

== See also ==
- Roman Catholicism in Chile
- St. Bartholomew

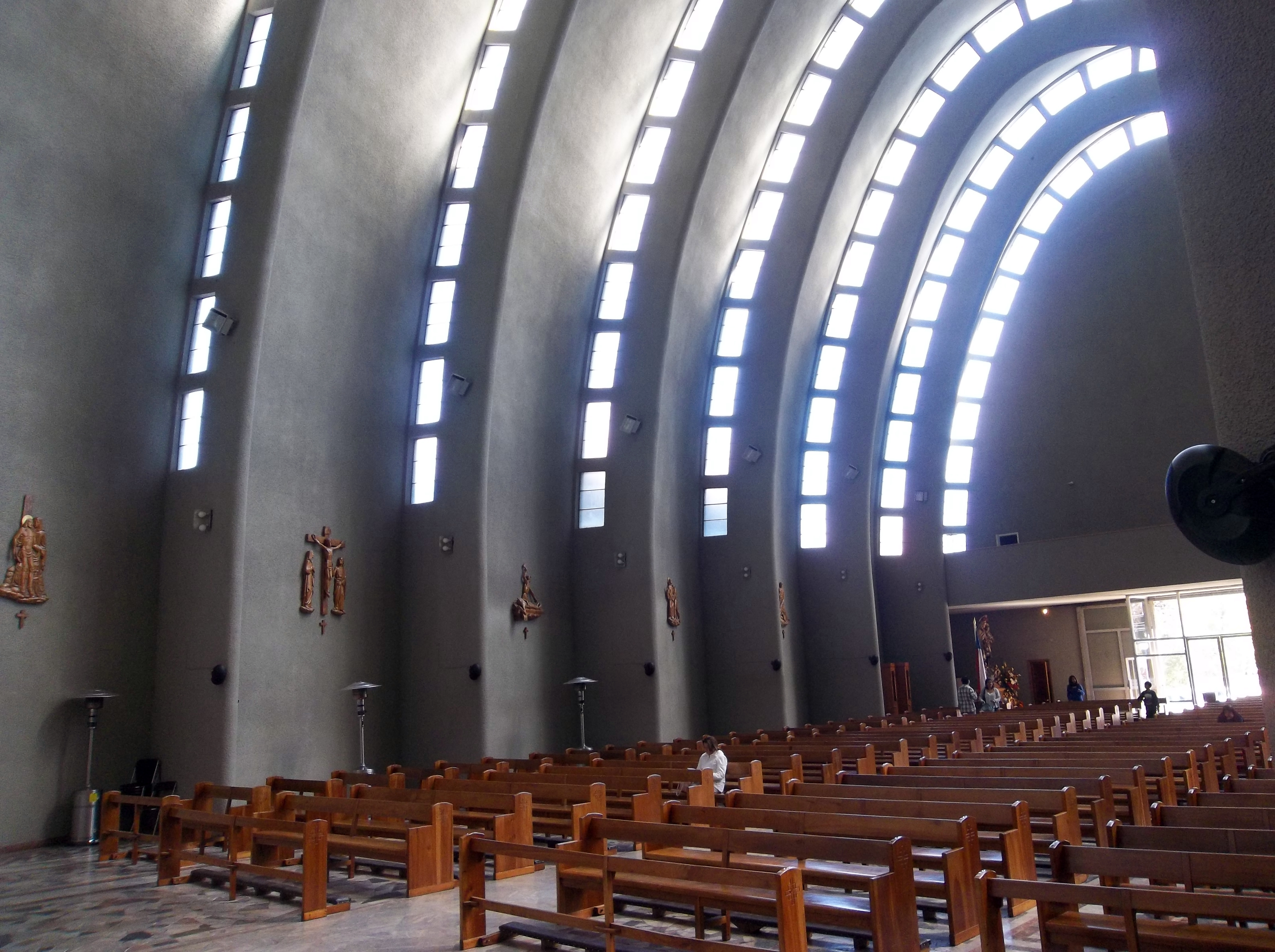
Internal View
