= Chillán =

Capital city of the Ñuble Region, Chile

- City and Commune
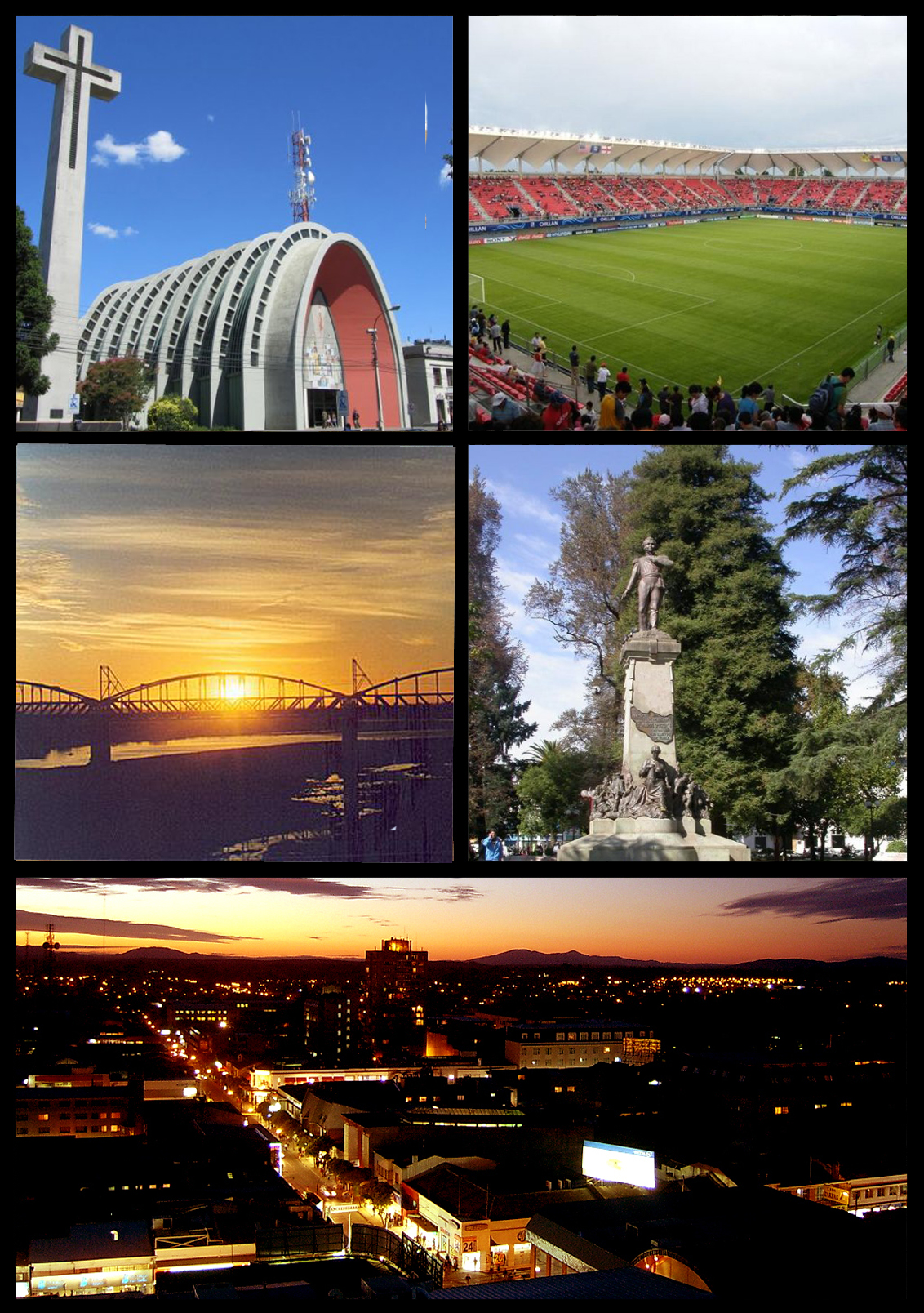
- Clockwise, from top: Chillán Cathedral, Nelson Oyarzún Arenas Stadium, puente ferroviario de Ñuble, Statue of Bernardo O'Higgins, panoramic view of the city at sunset.

- Coat of arms Location of the Chillán commune in the Ñuble Region Location in Chile
- Coordinates: 36°36′S 72°07′W
- Country: Chile
- Region: Ñuble
- Province: Diguillín
- Founded: 1580
- Founder: Martín Ruiz de Gamboa

Government
  - Type: Municipality
  - Alcalde: Camilo Benavente (PPD)

Area
  - Total: 511.2 km^{2} (197.4 sq mi)
- Elevation: 124 m (407 ft)

Population (2012 Census)
  - Total: 174,777
  - Density: 341.9/km^{2} (885.5/sq mi)
  - Urban: 148,015
  - Rural: 13,938
- Demonym: Chillanejo or Chillanense

Sex
  - Men: 77,007
  - Women: 84,946
- Time zone: UTC−4 (CLT)
  - Summer (DST): UTC−3 (CLST)
- Postal code: 3780000
- Area code: country + city = 56 + 42
- Climate: Csb
- Website: Official website (in Spanish)

Chillán (Spanish pronunciation: [tʃiˈʝan]) is the capital city of Ñuble Region, Diguillín Province, Chile, located about 400 km (249 mi) south of the country's capital, Santiago, near the center of the country. It has been the capital of the new Ñuble Region since 6 September 2015. Within the city is a railway station, an intercity bus terminal named María Teresa, and a regimental military base. The city features a modern, enclosed shopping centre in addition to the Chillán Market, an iconic multi-block, open-air farmers' market and street fair where fruits, vegetables, crafts, clothing and other goods are sold. The nearby mountains, such as in Laguna del Laja National Park (Spanish: Parque Nacional Laguna del Laja) and the Nevados de Chillán (English: 'snowy peaks of Chillán') are popular destinations for skiing, hiking and their hot springs.

Founded by the Spanish in 1580, the city withstood numerous early attacks by the indigenous Mapuche and Pehuenche, among other peoples, who were vehemently opposed to Spanish colonialism. Over time, Chillán became an important marketplace and settlement area for spanish colonizers and their Criollos descendants. Many goods from Patagonia and the Argentine Pampas were brought into Chillán across the mountain passes of the area. In the early 19th century, the countryside of Chillán was ravaged by the Chilean War of Independence and a subsequent banditry epidemic. In 1939, the city was devastated by a large earthquake, prompting the government to initiate an extensive reconstruction program.

== History ==
The zone where Chillán was built was previously inhabited by indigenous people called Chiquillanes.

According to Friar Ernesto Wilhelm de Moesbach Chillán is etymologically derived from "chilla", an indigenous word for the South American gray fox.

Chillán was founded in 1580 at the site of Chillán Viejo as San Bartolomé de Chillán by Martín Ruiz de Gamboa, who was campaigning against the local indigenous peoples at the time, but this moniker did not fare well, and was replaced by the current name, which in the local Indian language means "where the Sun is sitting".

During the Mapuche uprising of 1655, the city was besieged by Mapuche warriors. The Spanish defended the city from trenches and a palisade fort. Hoping for a miracle, the Spaniards put an image of Mary near the trenches, against which Mapuches are said to have shot arrows. In early March, about one month after the onset of uprising, distress was such that the Spaniards abandoned the city and headed north, escaping the conflict zone. The Real Audiencia of Santiago declared the evacuation an act of cowardice, and prohibited refugees from Chillán to go beyond the Maule River north. As an outbreak of smallpox occurred among the refugees, this was, in effect, a quarantine, as trespassing north was punished with death sentences.

From its foundation, Chillán has been at the heart of Chile's rich agricultural region. It is also in a region of seismic activity, suffering from devastating earthquakes throughout its history; the 1939 Chillán earthquake left over 30,000 dead and mobilized international help.

Chile's founding father, Bernardo O'Higgins, was born in Chillán in 1778. He was the force behind Chile's Independence from Spain, being elected supreme director and declaring independence after the Battle of Chacabuco against the Spaniards in 1817. His later victory at the Maipú battlefield cemented the country's freedom. He died in exile in Peru in 1842.

== Climate ==
Chillán has a Mediterranean climate (Köppen climate classification Csb). Winters are cool but mild, with a July average of 7.9 °C (46.2 °F). Most of the precipitation falls during this time of the year, with May to July being the wettest months, averaging over 200 mm (8 in). Summers, though, are dry and warm, with a January average of 20.1 °C (68.2 °F), and during this time, precipitation is rare, averaging only 2–3 days per month from December to February. Temperatures can occasionally exceed 30 °C (86.0 °F) from October to April. The average annual precipitation is 1,058 mm (42 in), but it is highly variable from year to year, with 1982 being the wettest year at 1,813 mm (71 in) and 1998 being the driest year at only 473 mm (19 in).

Climate data for Chillan (General Bernardo O'Higgins Airport) 1991–2020, extremes 1950–present
Month	Jan	Feb	Mar	Apr	May	Jun	Jul	Aug	Sep	Oct	Nov	Dec	Year
Record high °C (°F)	41.5 (106.7)	41.6 (106.9)	37.8 (100.0)	31.8 (89.2)	27.0 (80.6)	23.2 (73.8)	20.4 (68.7)	25.2 (77.4)	28.5 (83.3)	31.9 (89.4)	36.3 (97.3)	36.6 (97.9)	41.6 (106.9)
Mean daily maximum °C (°F)	29.6 (85.3)	29.2 (84.6)	26.3 (79.3)	20.6 (69.1)	15.3 (59.5)	12.3 (54.1)	12.1 (53.8)	14.1 (57.4)	17.0 (62.6)	19.7 (67.5)	23.4 (74.1)	26.8 (80.2)	20.5 (68.9)
Daily mean °C (°F)	20.5 (68.9)	19.9 (67.8)	17.6 (63.7)	13.6 (56.5)	10.5 (50.9)	8.5 (47.3)	7.8 (46.0)	9.2 (48.6)	11.1 (52.0)	13.2 (55.8)	15.9 (60.6)	18.5 (65.3)	13.9 (57.0)
Mean daily minimum °C (°F)	11.4 (52.5)	10.6 (51.1)	9.0 (48.2)	6.6 (43.9)	5.6 (42.1)	4.7 (40.5)	3.5 (38.3)	4.2 (39.6)	5.1 (41.2)	6.7 (44.1)	8.3 (46.9)	10.2 (50.4)	7.2 (45.0)
Record low °C (°F)	1.8 (35.2)	2.0 (35.6)	−1.2 (29.8)	−2.8 (27.0)	−5.9 (21.4)	−6.3 (20.7)	−7.0 (19.4)	−4.6 (23.7)	−3.2 (26.2)	−2.0 (28.4)	0.5 (32.9)	0.0 (32.0)	−7.0 (19.4)
Average precipitation mm (inches)	8.7 (0.34)	24.4 (0.96)	17.8 (0.70)	65.9 (2.59)	160.2 (6.31)	211.4 (8.32)	149.3 (5.88)	123.9 (4.88)	70.1 (2.76)	58.0 (2.28)	27.7 (1.09)	18.8 (0.74)	936.2 (36.86)
Average precipitation days (≥ 1.0 mm)	1.1	1.5	2.0	4.9	8.9	12.3	10.6	9.8	6.5	5.7	2.7	2.2	68.2
Average relative humidity (%)	50	53	58	68	80	85	83	78	72	67	60	54	67
Mean monthly sunshine hours	359.6	296.6	260.4	177.0	120.9	87.0	105.4	142.6	183.0	229.4	282.0	334.8	2,578.7
Mean daily sunshine hours	11.6	10.5	8.4	5.9	3.9	2.9	3.4	4.6	6.1	7.4	9.4	10.8	7.1
Source 1: Dirección Meteorológica de Chile (humidity 1970–2000)
Source 2: NOAA (precipitation days 1991–2020), Universidad de Chile (sunshine hours only)

The air in Chillán is the fourth-most polluted in Chile, after Santiago, Temuco, and Concepción. "As in Temuco, the main cause of air pollution in Chillán is the use of wood-burning stoves; about 62% of all households in Chillán use firewood as their main source of heating."

== Demographics ==
According to the 2002 census by the National Statistics Institute, the commune of Chillán spans an area of 511.2 km^{2} (197 sq mi) and has 161,953 inhabitants (77,007 men and 84,946 women). Of these, 148,015 (91.4%) lived in urban areas and 13,938 (8.6%) in rural areas. The population grew by 8.3% (12,442 persons) between the 1992 and 2002 censuses.

The demonym for a person from Chillán, used for more than 400 years by local residents, is Chillanejo, yet this is not found in the Royal Spanish Academy Dictionary, which only recognizes Chillanense.

=== Notable people ===
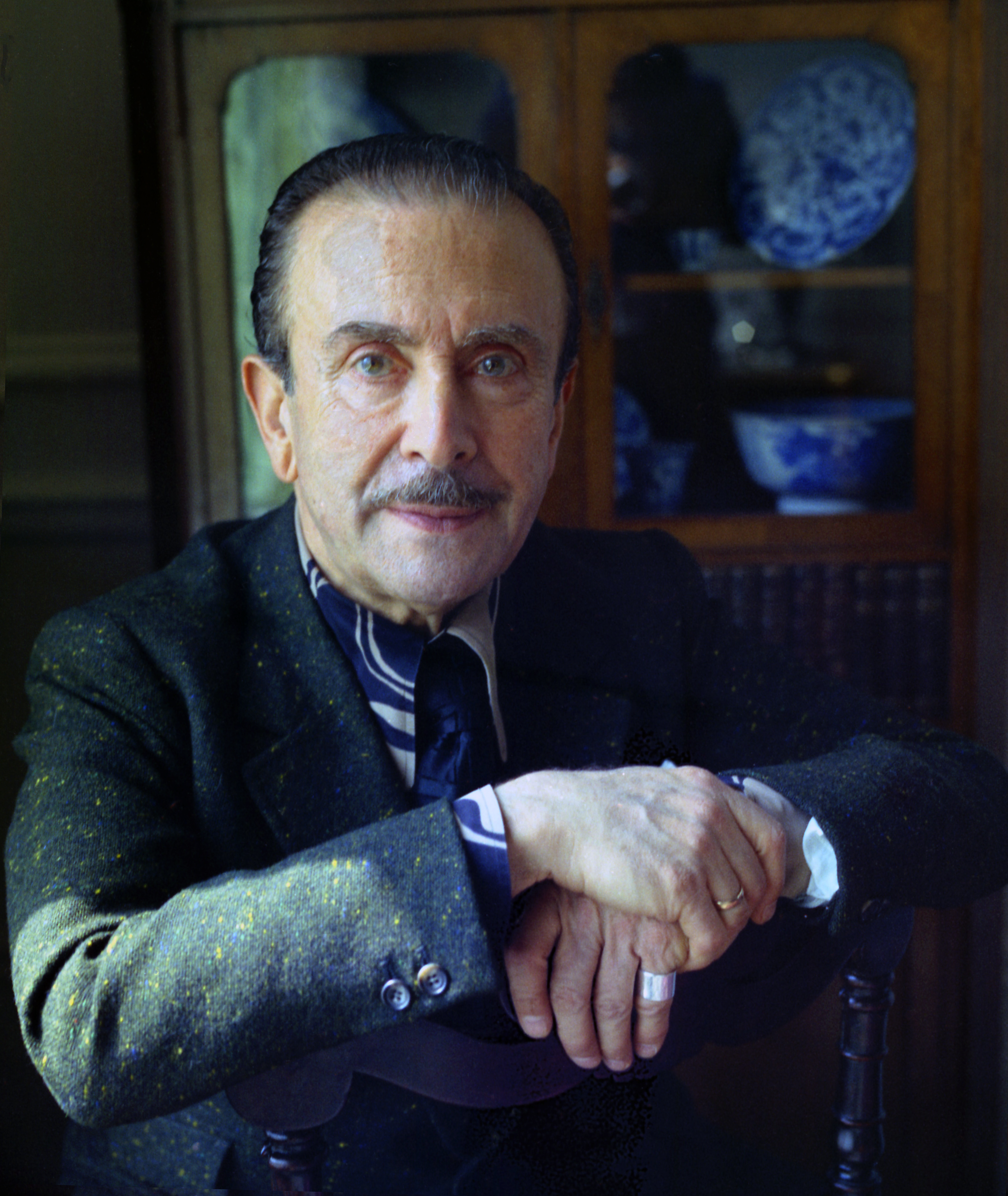
Claudio Arrau in 1974, by Allan Warren

Isabel Riquelme, mother of Chilean independence leader Bernardo O'Higgins, was born in Chillán in 1758. María Cornelia Olivares, one of the national heroines of the Chilean War of Independence, was also from the city. In addition, Chillán has produced a number of artists. A notable example is Claudio Arrau, a pianist. Additionally, Ramón Vinay is the tenor who played Otello in the 1950s, his recording of the role with Toscanini. He was a regular at the New York City Metropolitan Opera, where he sang both tenor and baritone roles. One of his last performances at this house was as the Barber of Seville's Basilio, a bass role. He retired from the stage in 1969.

Other "Chillanejos" include writer Marta Brunet, sculptor Marta Colvin, painter Arturo Pacheco Altamirano, and Juan de Dios Aldea, who, however, did not reach the international acclaim achieved by Arrau and Vinay. Super Smash Bros. player Gonzalo "ZeRo" Barrios who had a record-breaking 56-tournament winning streak is also from Chillán.

== Administration ==
As a commune, Chillán is a third-level administrative division of Chile administered by a municipal council, headed by an alcalde, who is directly elected every four years. The 2008-2020 alcalde is Sergio Zarzar Andonie (ILE).

Within the electoral divisions of Chile, Chillán is represented in the Chamber of Deputies by Carlos Abel Jarpa (PRSD) and Rosauro Martínez (RN) as part of the 41st electoral district, together with Coihueco, Pinto, San Ignacio, El Carmen, Pemuco, Yungay and Chillán Viejo. The commune is represented in the Senate by Victor Pérez Varela (UDI) and Felipe Harboe (PPD) as part of the 13th senatorial constituency (Biobío-Coast).

== Economy ==
In 2021, the number of registered companies in Chillán was 14,689. The Economic Complexity Index (ECI) in 2018 was 2.02, while the economic activities with the highest Revealed Comparative Advantage (RCA) indices were Repair of Agricultural and Forestry Machinery (140.3), Other Sports-Related Activities (45.83), and Retail Sale of Lamps, Wall Lights, and Similar Items (20.48).

== International Relations ==
The city of Chillán hosts a series of international relations institutions, such as the Regional Unit of International Affairs (URAI) of the Regional Government of Ñuble, responsible for the analysis and management of the region’s bilateral and multilateral relations with Latin America and the rest of the world; the Regional Unit for Investment Promotion and Attraction; the regional offices of the National Migration Service and the General Directorate for Export Promotion (ProChile); the Department of Migration and International Police of the Investigations Police of Chile; and the Office of Social and Cultural Diversity of the Municipality of Chillán, which provides support to the city’s migrant population. In the field of international relations and higher education, the main actor in Chillán is the International Relations Unit of the Office of Outreach and Engagement, together with the Institute of Languages of the Adventist University of Chile.

== Transport ==
The city of Chillán is connected to Chile's capital Santiago by both a modern highway and a rebuilt railway system TerraSur that makes the trip in less than five hours. TerraSur, which terminates in Chillán station, and the Alameda-Temuco train both operate on the railway connecting Chillan with Rancagua and Santiago.

== Gallery ==
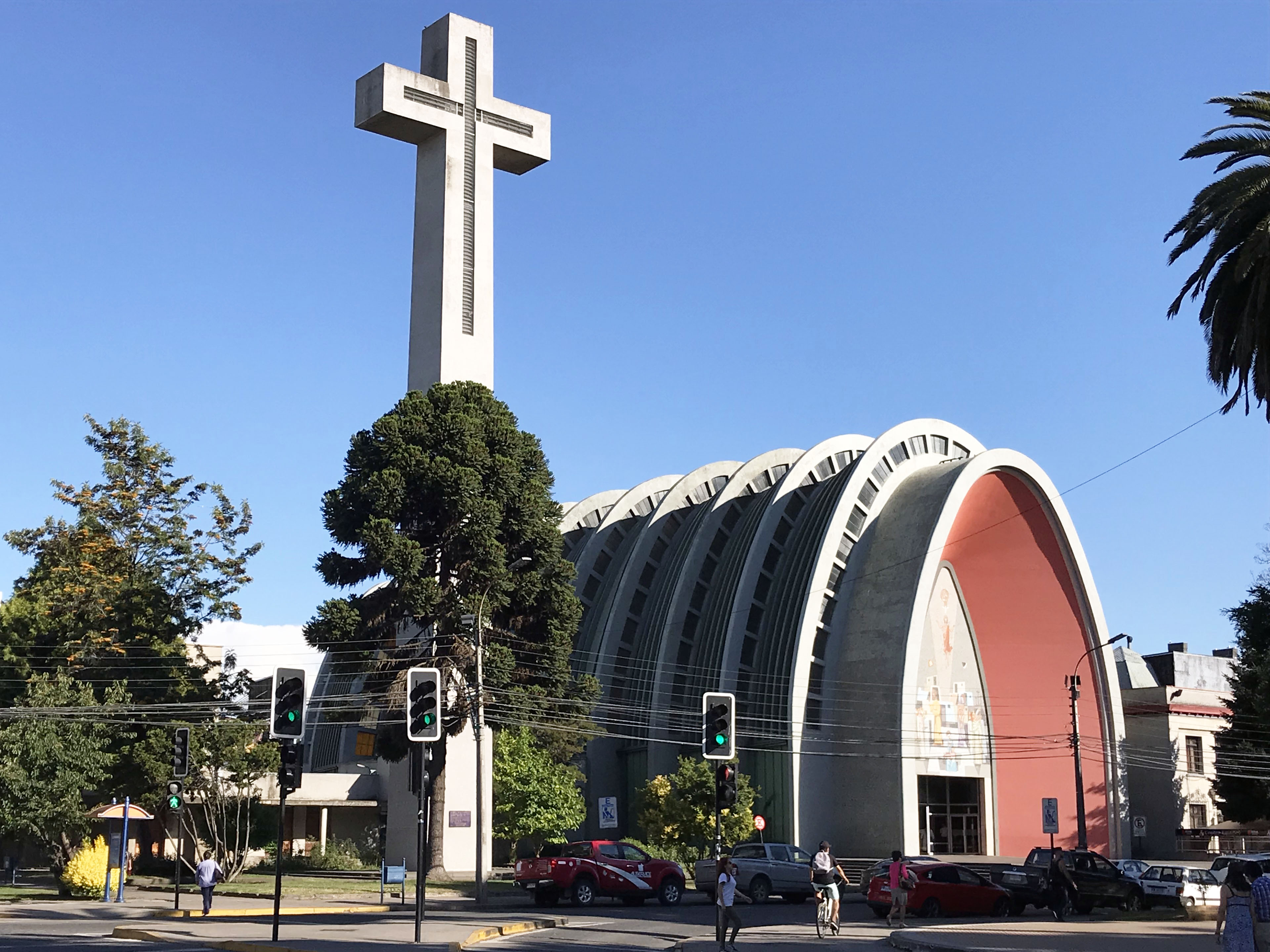
St. Bartholomew Cathedral

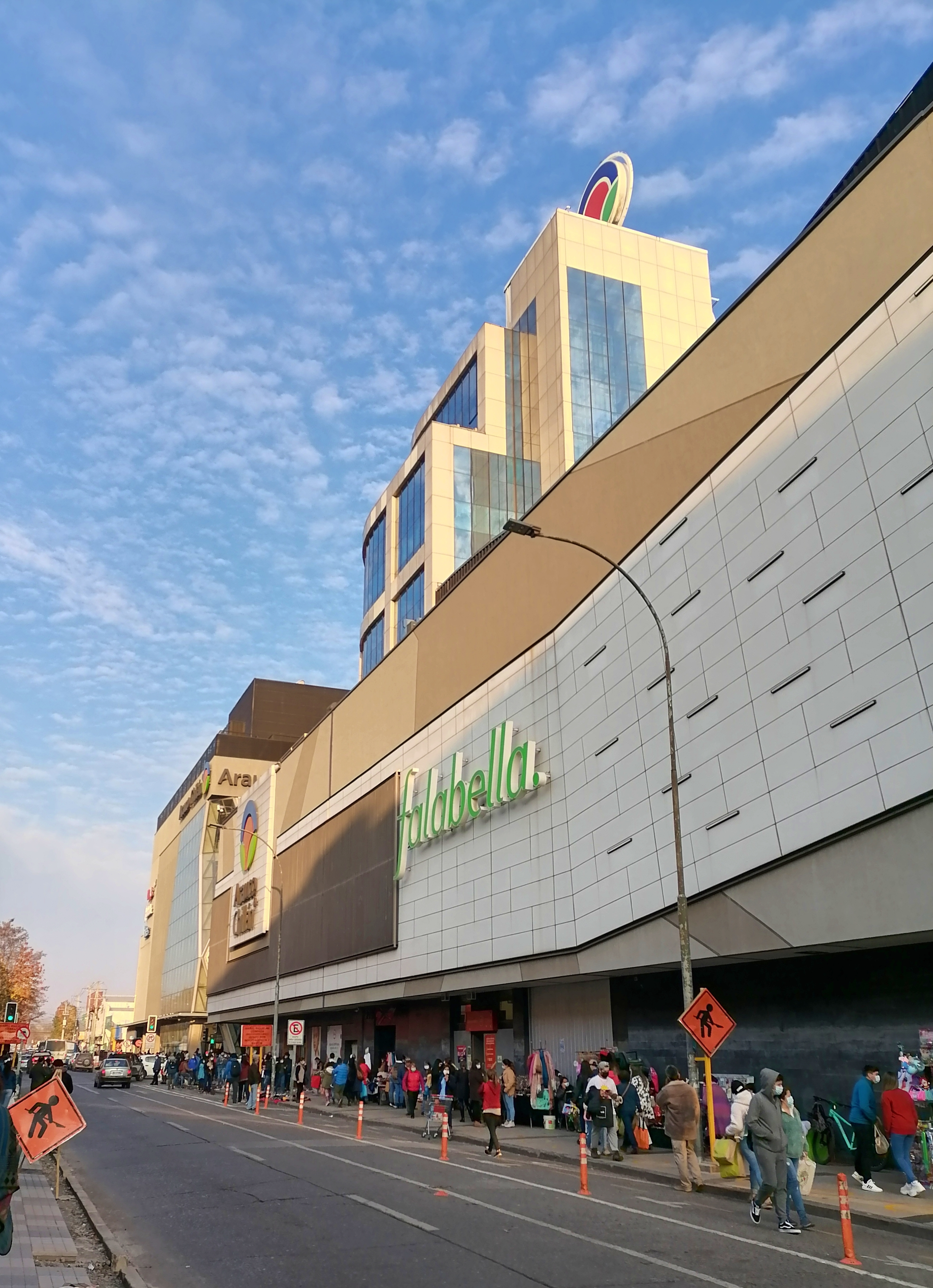
Shopping in Chillán

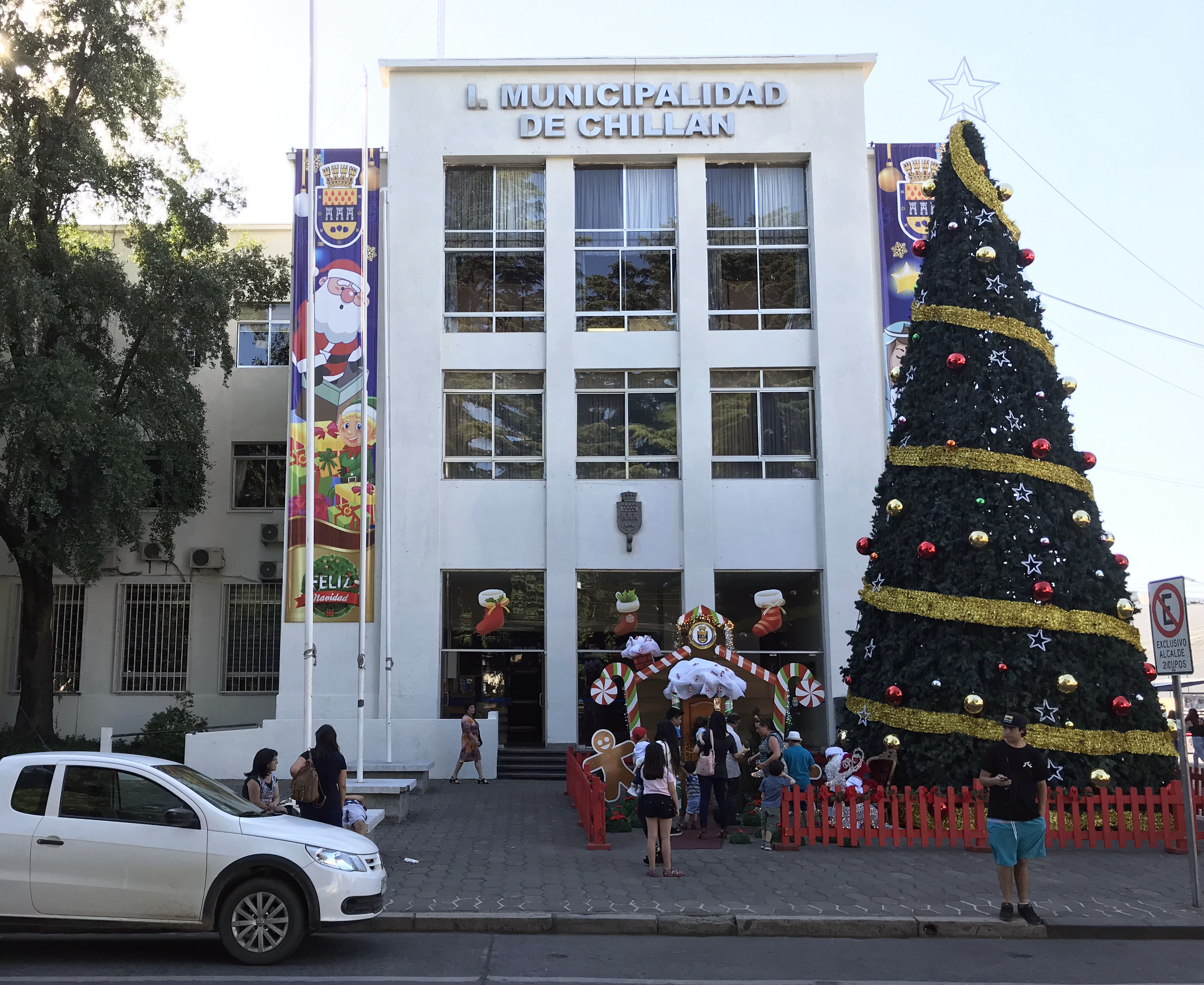
Consistorial Building

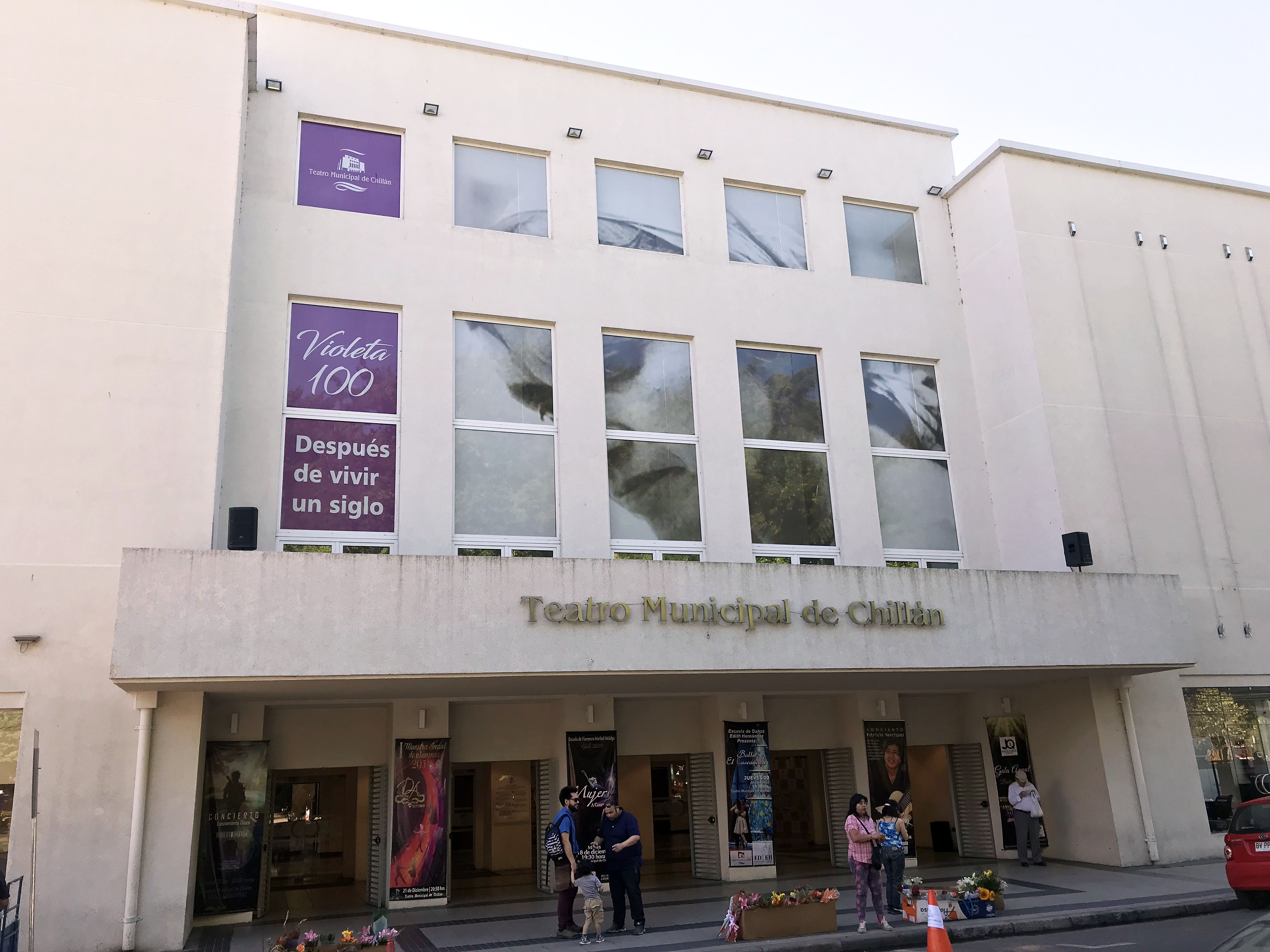
Municipal theater

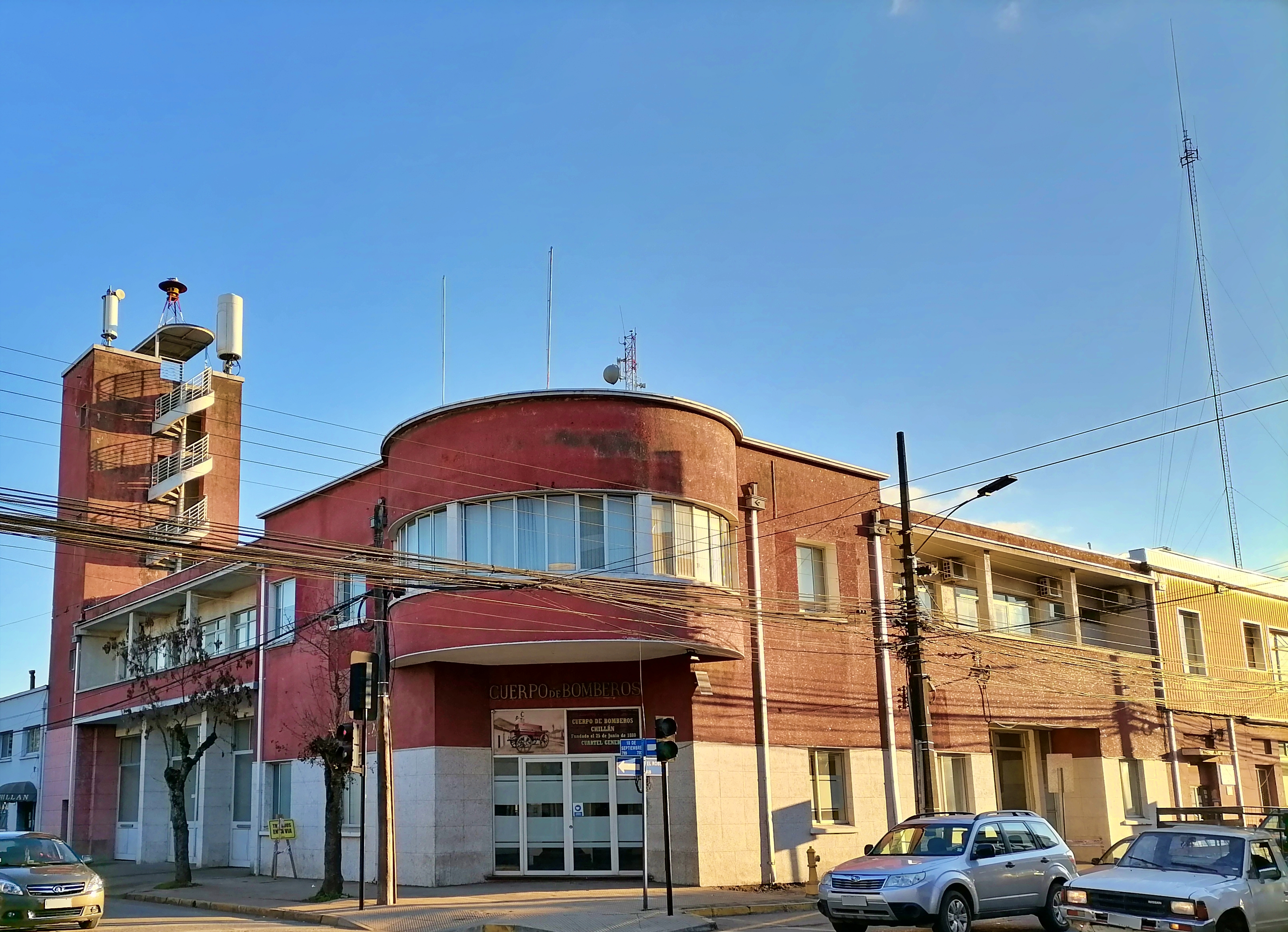
Edificio del Cuerpo de Bomberos, Chillán

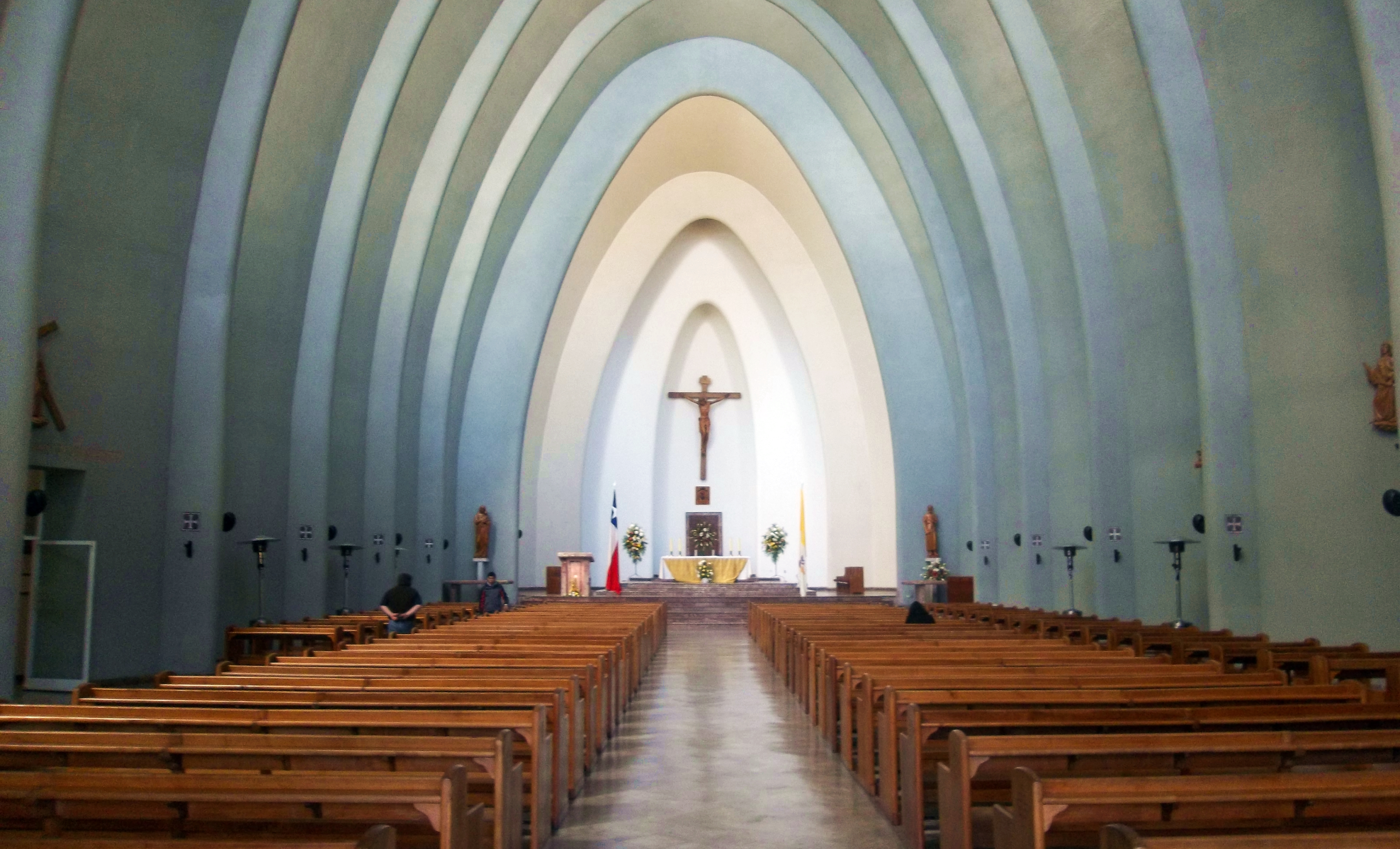
Chillan Cathedral interior

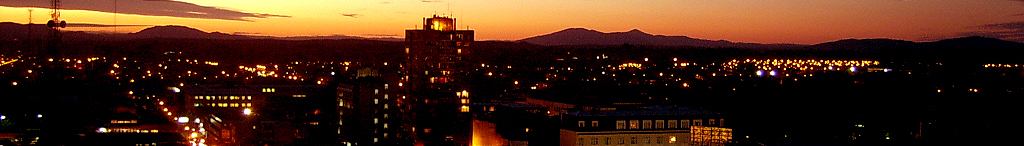
City view

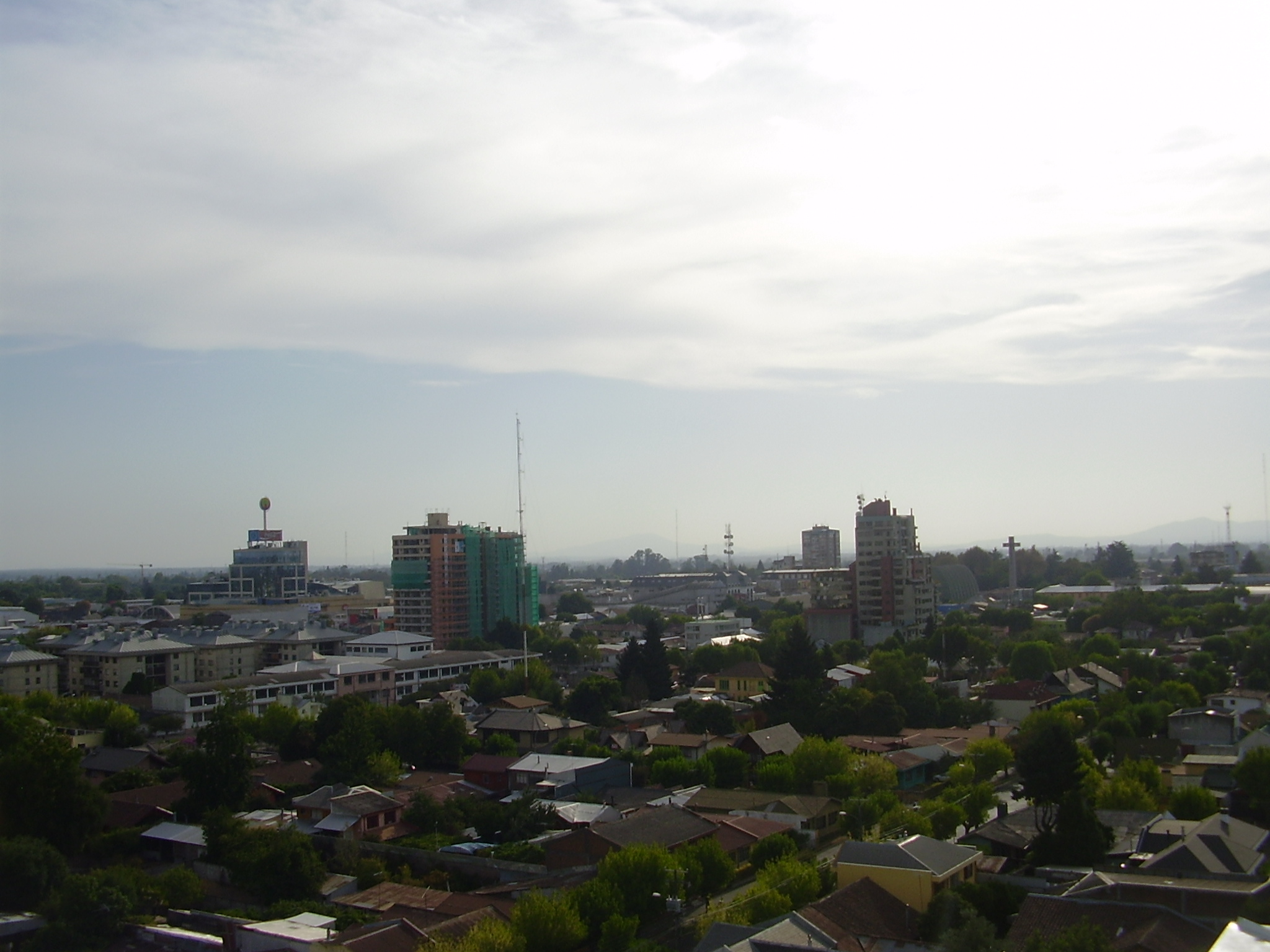
Panoramic view

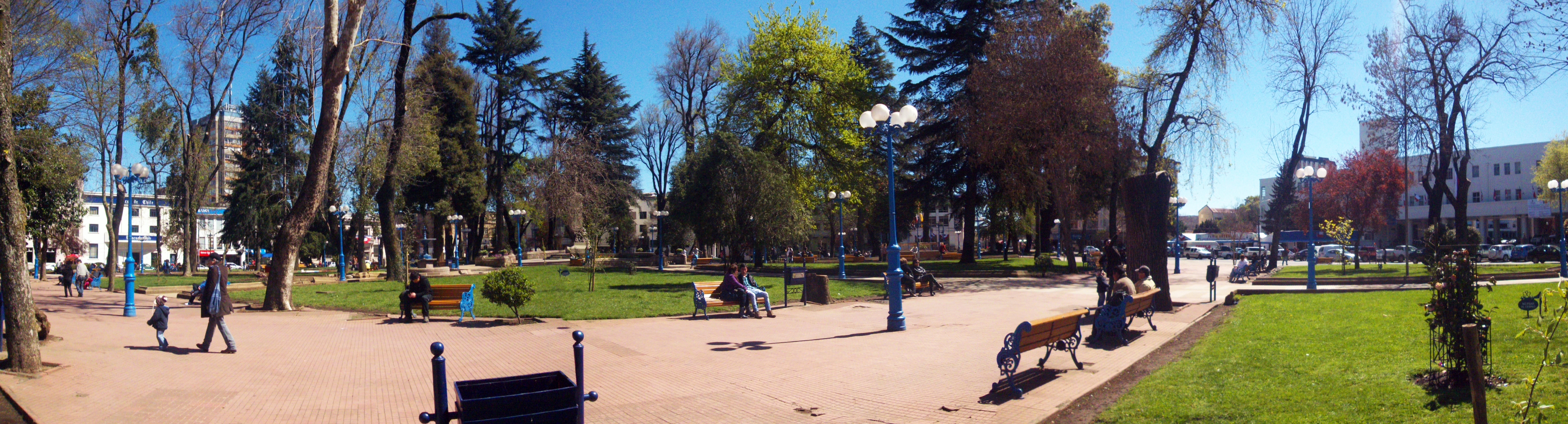
Plaza de Armas, Chillán

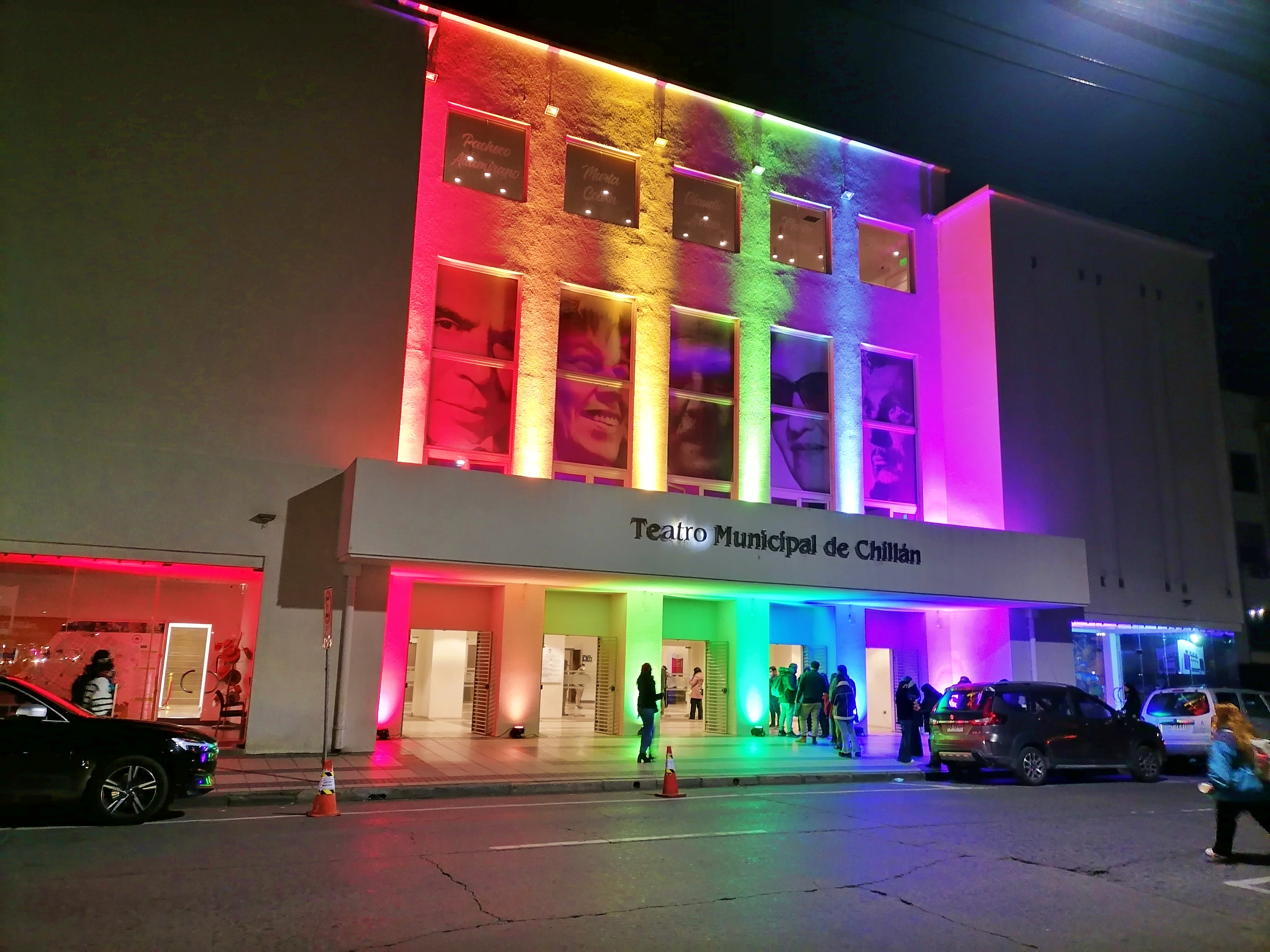
Municipal Theater, Chillán

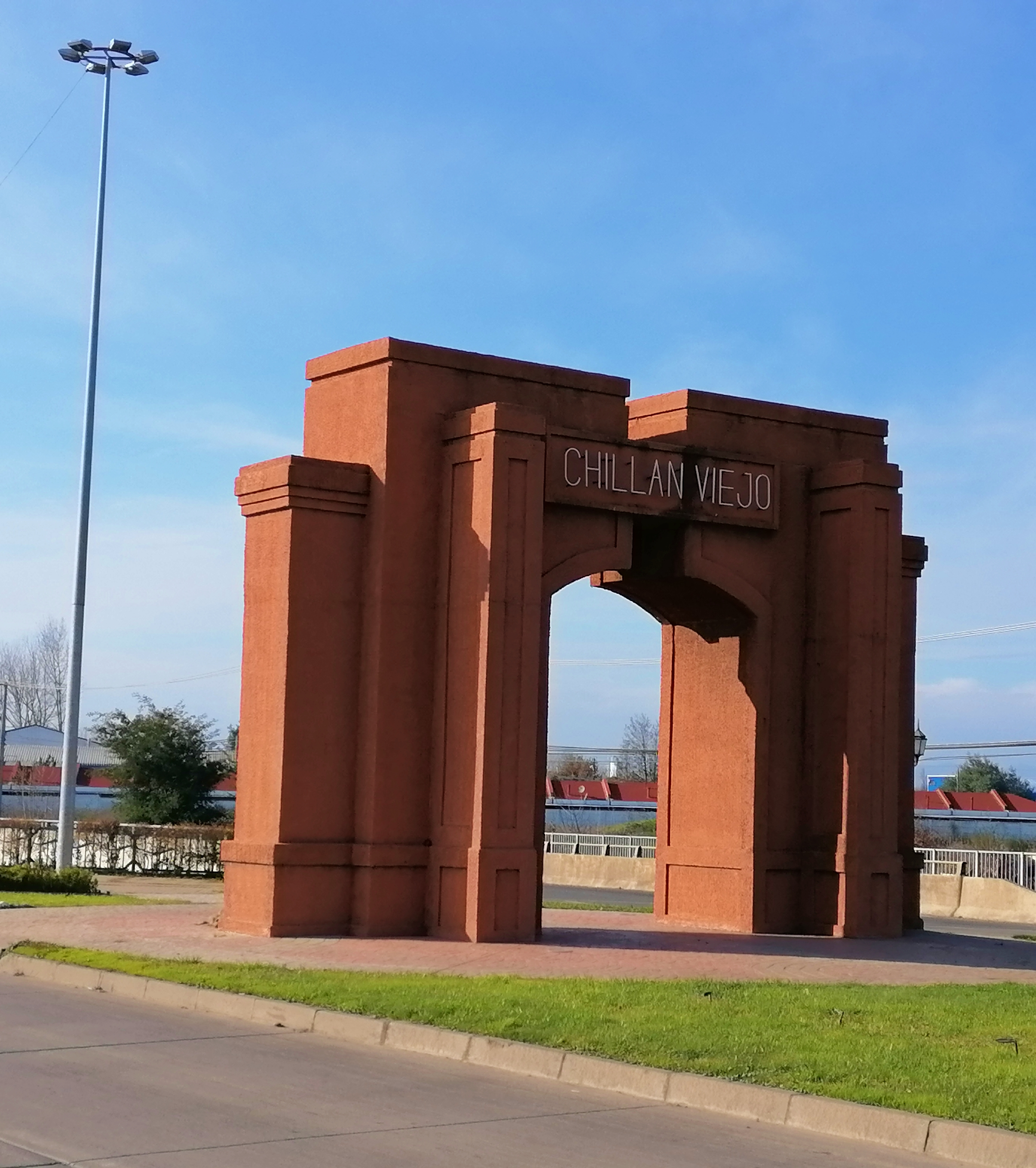
Arc, Chillán Viejo

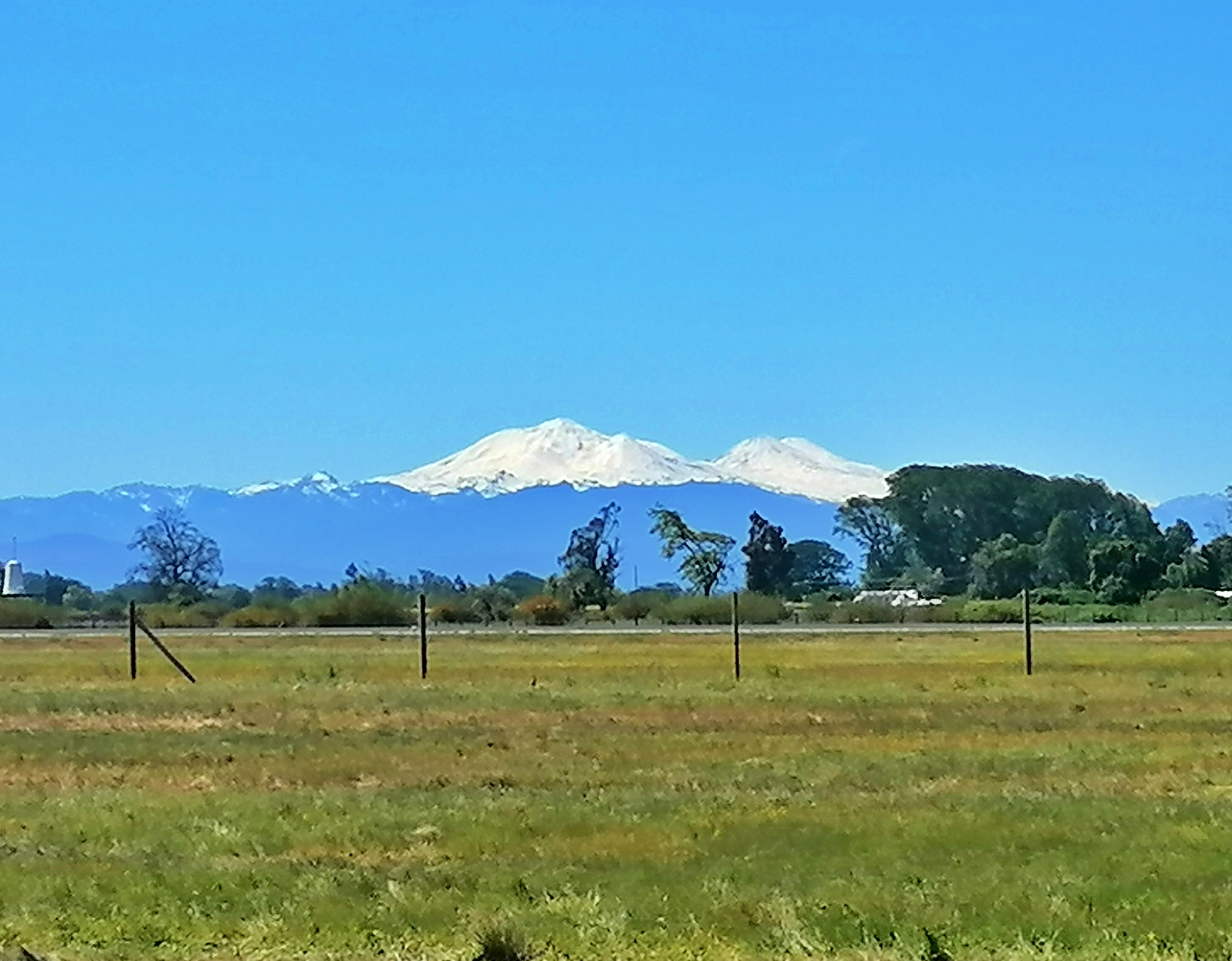
View from Chillan airport

== See also ==
- Termas de Chillán
