= Coihueco =

- City and Commune
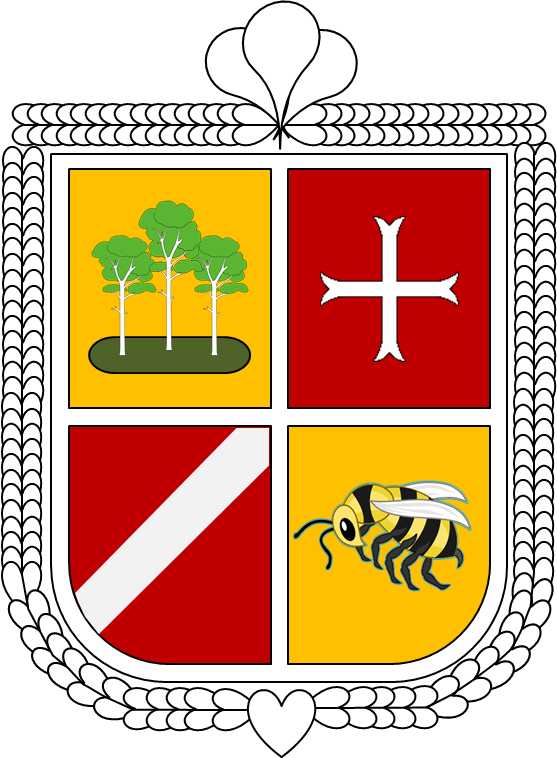
- Coat of arms

- Map of the Coihueco commune in the Ñuble Region

- Location in Chile
- Coordinates: 38°38′S 72°13′W
- Country: Chile
- Region: Ñuble
- Province: Punilla

Government
  - Type: Municipality
  - Alcalde: Arnoldo Manuel Jiménez Venegas (PPD)

Area
  - Total: 1,776.6 km^{2} (685.9 sq mi)
- Elevation: 325 m (1,066 ft)

Population (2012 Census)
  - Total: 25,159
  - Density: 14.161/km^{2} (36.678/sq mi)
  - Urban: 7,230
  - Rural: 16,353

Sex
  - Men: 12,211
  - Women: 11,372
- Time zone: UTC−4 (CLT)
  - Summer (DST): UTC−3 (CLST)
- Area code: 56 + 42
- Website: Municipality of Coihueco

Coihueco (Spanish pronunciation: [kojˈweko]) is a Chilean commune and city in Punilla Province, Ñuble Region. It is located near Chillán, the provincial capital. Coihueco borders San Carlos and San Fabián on the north, Argentina on the east, Pinto on the South, and Chillán on the west.

== Demographics ==
According to the 2002 census of the National Statistics Institute, Coihueco spans an area of 1,776.6 km^{2} (686 sq mi) and has 23,583 inhabitants (12,211 men and 11,372 women). Of these, 7,230 (30.7%) lived in urban areas and 16,353 (69.3%) in rural areas. The population grew by 4.4% (998 persons) between the 1992 and 2002 censuses.

== Administration ==
As a commune, Coihueco is a third-level administrative division of Chile administered by a municipal council, headed by an alcalde who is directly elected every four years. The 2008-2012 alcalde is Arnoldo Manuel Jiménez Venegas (PPD).

Within the electoral divisions of Chile, Coihueco is represented in the Chamber of Deputies by Carlos Abel Jarpa (PRSD) and Rosauro Martínez (RN) as part of the 41st electoral district, together with Chillán, Pinto, San Ignacio, El Carmen, Pemuco, Yungay and Chillán Viejo. The commune is represented in the Senate by Victor Pérez Varela (UDI) and Mariano Ruiz-Esquide Jara (PDC) as part of the 13th senatorial constituency (Biobío-Coast).
