= Sergio Zarzar =

Chilean politician

Sergio Zarzar Andonie (January 12, 1952) is an entrepreneur, conservative political professor Chilean of Palestinian origin, linked to the National Renewal Party.

In the municipal elections in 2008 he was elected mayor of the town of Chillán with 64.15% of the votes cast.

He graduated from the Colegio Seminario de Chillán in 1969. The following year he attended the University of Chile, Ñuble headquarters. He eventually became a professor of physical education. He became a leader of Ñublense in 1984. In the 1990s he founded the talk radio program Sports Dimension. He was also a columnist for the newspaper La Discusion, and hosted a television program on the old channel and direct RTU called Seminar Magazine. In 2004 he served as the president of Ñublense, and in 2007 he became a director of the Asociación Nacional de Fútbol Profesional (ANFP). He was subsequently elected mayor of Chillán.

== Edilicia Management 2009-2012 ==
Controls on freedom of expression of officials of Health and Education:

Controversy was caused by letter No. 101/1177/2009 issued by the city of Chillán in late 2009, which was called a "Gag Rule". The document stipulates that the statements to, or interviews by, the workers health or the municipal education union to the media must be approved by the mayor or the city manager.

This order was rejected by the Chillán Teachers College, the Municipal Officials Association of Primary Care (which filed a protection from the Court of Appeals against the order municipal) council members and opponents. While mayor accused his opponents of attempting to politicize an ordinance aimed at regulating internal communications.
