= Diguillín =

Diguillín Province Provincia de Diguillín
- Province
- Seal Coat of arms

- Location in the Ñuble Region

- Location in Chile
- Coordinates: 36°55′S 72°00′W
- Country: Chile
- Region: Ñuble
- Capital: Bulnes
- Communes: List of 9

Area
  - Total: 5,094.03 km^{2} (1,966.82 sq mi)

Population (2024)
  - Total: 336,801
  - Density: 66.1168/km^{2} (171.242/sq mi)
- Time zone: UTC−4 (CLT)
  - Summer (DST): UTC−3 (CLST)

The Diguillín Province is the largest of the three provinces of the Ñuble Region in Chile. Its capital is Bulnes. Spread over an area of 5,094.03 km^{2} (1,966.82 sq mi), it had a population of 336,801 inhabitants as per the 2024 Chilean census. The province was established by law on 5 September 2017 and came into effect from 6 September 2018.

== History ==
The Ñuble Region was established by Law 21.033 enacted on 5 September 2017 and came into effect on 6 September 2018. It is divided into three provinces: Diguillín, Punilla and Itata Provinces, which are further divided into 21 communes.

The name Diguillín means "place of water" in Mapuche, which is a reference to the Diguillín River, which crosses the province.

== Geography ==
Itata Province is one of the three provinces of the Ñuble Region in Chile. It is located in the south-western part of the country, and is spread over an area of 5,094.03 km^{2} (1,966.82 sq mi), and has its capital at Bulnes. About 87% of the land area is part of the Itata River basin, and the remaining forms part of the Biobío River basin.

The province is divided into nine communes–Bulnes, Chillán, Chillán Viejo, San Ignacio, Pinto, El Carmen, Pemuco, Yungay, and Quillón.

=== Climate ===
Diguillin has a Mediterranean climate (Classification: Csb) with an average annual temperature of 17.57 °C (63.63 °F). It receives an average of 130.93 mm (5.155 in) of precipitation annually.

== Demographics ==
According to the 2024 Chilean census, Diguillín Province had a population of 336,801 inhabitants. The population consisted of 176,114 females (52.3%) and 160,687 males (47.7%). About 17.2% of the population was below the age of 15 years, 66.9% belonged to the age group of 15–64 years, and 15.9% was aged 65 years or older. The province had an urban population of 256,807 inhabitants (76.2%) and a rural population of 79,994 inhabitants (23.8%). Most of the residents were born in Chile, accounting for 327,800 inhabitants (97.3%). Non-indigenous people formed the majority of the population with 323,189 inhabitants (96%), while 13,602 inhabitants (4%) identified themselves as belonging to indigenous groups. Roman Catholics formed the largest religious group with 152,309 adherents (54.8%), followed by Evangelicals or Protestants with 59,912 adherents (21.6%), and 58,227 inhabitants (20.9%) indicating no religious affiliation.
