= Chillán Viejo =

- City and Commune
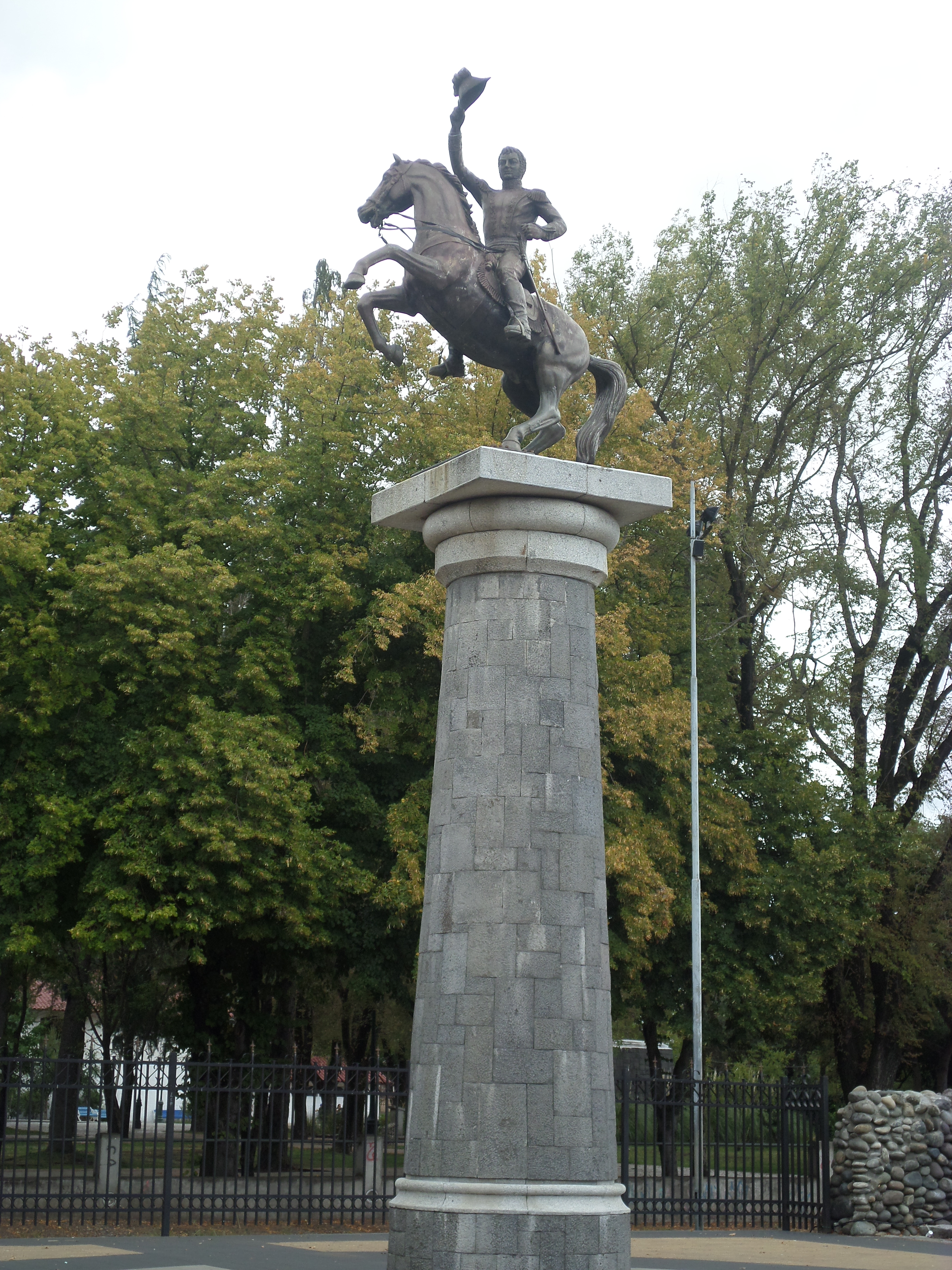
- Statue of Bernardo O'Higgins

- Flag Coat of arms Chillán Viejo in the Ñuble Region Location in Chile
- Coordinates: 36°37′26″S 72°08′09″W
- Country: Chile
- Region: Ñuble
- Province: Diguillín
- Founded: 1895

Government
  - Type: Municipality
  - Alcalde: Felipe Alwin Lagos (Ind.)

Area
  - Total: 291.8 km^{2} (112.7 sq mi)
- Elevation: 124 m (407 ft)

Population (2012 Census)
  - Total: 28,735
  - Density: 98.47/km^{2} (255.0/sq mi)
  - Urban: 18,827
  - Rural: 3,257

Sex
  - Men: 10,791
  - Women: 11,293
- Time zone: UTC−4 (CLT)
  - Summer (DST): UTC−3 (CLST)
- Area code: 56 + 42
- Climate: Csb
- Website: Official website (in Spanish)

Chillán Viejo is a city and commune (Spanish: comuna) in the Diguillín Province of Chile Region of Ñuble According to the 2002 census, the population of the commune was 22,084 and it has an area of 292 km^{2} (113 sq mi).

== History ==
Originally, Chillán Viejo was the location of a Spanish fort with the name of San Ildefonso, which was established in 1565, during the campaign of Pedro de Villagra against Loble and the Mapuche north of the Biobío River. Ordered in 1579 to establish a city at the site by Governor Rodrigo de Quiroga, Martin Ruiz de Gamboa founded the city on June 25, 1580 after replacing Quiroga as governor following his death. He gave it the name San Bartolomé de Chillán y Gamboa and populated it with 50 Spaniards and 60 more in the fort. It suffered a number of attacks before it was destroyed by the Mapuche in 1599 after the Disaster of Curalaba. Governor Francisco de Quiñónez immediately repaired it in April 1599. Later, in 1655, the same Mapuche and the neighboring Pehuenches forced the citizens to abandon it again. When it was again reoccupied, it was demolished by an earthquake on March 15, 1657. It was repopulated again in 1663, under Ángel de Peredo. The earthquake of May 25, 1751, that ruined old Concepcion, also damaged the city, aggravated considerably by a simultaneous extraordinary flooding of the Chillán River. This forced its transfer two years later to the site that it occupies today.

It acquired some fame during the Chilean War of Independence, especially in the Siege of Chillan from July 15 to August 12, 1813, after the death in her (May 21 of that year) of the Spanish leader, Antonio Pareja, and it was sacked by the royalist montoneras of Pincheira on September 18, 1819. It became the capital of the Chillán Department and after it was ruined in the earthquake of February 20, 1835, most of its population was moved 3 km (2 mi) to the northeast to form the present city of Chillán.

== Demographics ==
According to the 2002 census of the National Statistics Institute, Chillán Viejo spans an area of 291.8 km^{2} (113 sq mi) and has 22,084 inhabitants (10,791 men and 11,293 women). Of these, 18,827 (85.3%) lived in urban areas and 3,257 (14.7%) in rural areas. Between the 1992 and 2002 censuses, the population grew by 32.1% (5,369 persons). The 2017 census showed that the total population for the commune was 30,907. The demonym for a person from Chillán Viejo is Chillanvejano or Chillanvejana for a woman.

Notable Chillanvejanos

Chillán Viejo was the birthplace of Francisco Núñez de Pineda y Bascuñán in 1607 and Bernardo O'Higgins in 1778.

== Administration ==
As a commune, Chillán Viejo is a third-level administrative division of Chile administered by a municipal council, headed by an alcalde who is directly elected every four years. The 2008-2012 alcalde is Felipe Alwin Lagos (Ind.). The municipal council has the following members:

- Pablo Pérez Arostizaga (PDC)
- Susana Martínez Cornejo (RN)
- Rodolfo Gasmuri Sanchez (ILF)
- Jorge Del Pozo Pastenes (PRSD)
- Verónica Knothe Badilla (PDC)
- Rodrigo Arzola Helo (RN)

Within the electoral divisions of Chile, Chillán Viejo is represented in the Chamber of Deputies by Carlos Abel Jarpa (PRSD) and Rosauro Martínez (RN) as part of the 41st electoral district, together with Chillán, Coihueco, Pinto, San Ignacio, El Carmen, Pemuco and Yungay. The commune is represented in the Senate by Victor Pérez Varela (UDI) and Mariano Ruiz-Esquide Jara (PDC) as part of the 13th senatorial constituency (Biobío-Coast).
