= The History of Love =

2005 novel by Nicole Krauss

- Front cover of hardcover edition
- Author: Nicole Krauss
- Language: English
- Genre: Novel, Postmodernism
- Publisher: W.W. Norton & Company
- Publication date: May 2, 2005
- Publication place: United States
- Media type: Print (hardback & paperback), ebook, audiobook
- Pages: 252 pp (hardcover)
- ISBN: 0-393-06034-9
- OCLC: 57452397
- Dewey Decimal: 813/.6 22
- LC Class: PS3611.R38 H57 2005
- Preceded by: Man Walks Into a Room (2002)
- Followed by: Great House (2010)

The History of Love: A Novel is a 2005 novel by the American writer Nicole Krauss. The book was a 2006 finalist for the Orange Prize for Fiction and won the 2008 William Saroyan International Prize for Writing for fiction.

An excerpt from the novel was published in The New Yorker in 2004 under the title The Last Words on Earth.

== Plot ==
In Poland, approximately 70 years before the present, the 10-year-old Polish-Jewish Leopold (Leo) Gursky falls in love with his neighbor Alma Mereminski. The two begin a relationship that develops over the course of 10 years. In this time, Leo writes three books that he gives to Alma, since she is the only person he deeply cares about. Leo promises he will never love anyone but her.

Alma, now 20, is sent to the United States by her father, who feared the alarming news concerning Nazi Germany. Leo does not know that Alma is pregnant and dreams of going to America to meet her. A short time after, the Germans invade Poland and Leo takes cover in the woods, living on roots, small animals, bugs and what he can steal from farmers' cellars. After three and a half years of hiding, he goes to America and finds Alma but is shocked to hear she thought he had died in the war and had married the son of the manager of the factory she works at. He is devastated when he finds she has had another child with her husband. He asks her to come with him, but she refuses. She tells him, however, about his son Isaac who is now five years old. Heartbroken, Leo leaves, and later becomes a locksmith under the guidance of his cousin. Leo regularly watches Isaac from a distance, wishing to be part of the boy's life but scared to come in contact with him.

In the present day, Leo is a lonely old man who waits for his death, along with his recently found childhood friend, Bruno, and Alma has been dead for five years. Leo still keeps track of his son, who has become a famous writer, much to Leo's enjoyment since he believes Isaac inherited the talent from his father. Leo's depression deepens when he reads in a newspaper that his son has died at the age of 60, and Leo develops an obsession with finding his place in his son's world, to the extent that he breaks into Isaac's house to see if he had read Words for Everything, a book about his life that he recently wrote and sent to Isaac.

Zvi Litvinoff's perspective is introduced. In the past, a younger Leo wrote a letter to his old friend Zvi, asking for his manuscript of The History of Love to be returned to him. Leo had given Zvi The History before they parted, years ago. However, his wife Rosa informs him that the book was destroyed in a flood, choosing to hide that her husband did not write The History of Love. Zvi also describes an event where Leo fell gravely ill in Poland and wrote his own obituary, after which Zvi stole it in the hope that it would keep his friend alive.

Unknown to Leo is that the book had been published in a small printing of two thousand copies (and re-published upon the supposed author's death) in Spanish, but under the name of Zvi Litvinoff, who copied the book thinking Leo was killed in Poland. Zvi felt so guilty for copying his book that he added his friend's stolen obituary as the last chapter, telling the publisher that including the obituary was conditional to printing the book, although doing so did not make sense with the plot. Zvi died later without telling the world about the real author of The History of Love.

In a parallel story, a 15-year-old girl, Alma Singer, named after the Alma in The History of Love, her parents' favorite book, is struggling to cope with the loss of her father due to cancer. Her mother becomes distant and lonely, escaping into her work of book translation. Her younger brother Bird, so called for jumping from the second story of a building hoping he could fly, seeks refuge in religion and believes himself to be one of God's chosen people, thus distancing himself from reality. Alma finds refuge in one of her father's hobbies: surviving in the wild. Alma also bears a crush on her Russian pen friend Misha, who has moved to New York. The two become a couple but they break up because of Alma's incertitude.

One day, her mother receives a letter from a mysterious man named Jacob Marcus who requests that she translate The History of Love from Spanish to English for $100,000, to be paid in increments of $25,000 as the work progresses. Alma's mother finds the sum suspicious, but the stranger confesses that his mother used to read the book to him when he was a child, so it has a great sentimental value. Alma sees this as an opportunity to help her mother recover from her depression and changes her mother's straightforward letters to Jacob Marcus into more romantic versions. When the letters stop before her mother completes the translation of the book, Alma decides to find the mysterious client.

She starts by noting down what she knows about Jacob Marcus in her diary, and concludes that the Alma in the book was real and proceeds to find her. She struggles in her search for Alma Mereminski, but succeeds when she realizes that Alma could have married and finds her under the name of Moritz. She is disappointed to hear that Alma has been dead for five years. However, she finds out that Isaac Moritz is the first of Alma's sons and a famous writer. When she starts reading his bestselling book, she finds that the main character's name is Jacob Marcus and realizes that Isaac Moritz had hired her mother to translate the book. Isaac is dead, however, which explains why his letters had stopped coming to their home. To be sure about her suspicions, Alma leaves a note on Isaac's door asking who the writer of the novel is.

In the meanwhile, Bird finds Alma's diary and misinterprets the names Alma Mereminski and Alma Moritz as being his sister's real names, and believes they had different fathers. Isaac's brother calls Alma, after reading the note and the original manuscript of the book, to tell her that Gursky is the real author, but Bird answers the telephone and it confuses him even further. He now suspects that Leopold Gursky is Alma's real father. To cleanse his sin of bragging and to regain the status as one of the chosen ones, he decides to set up a meeting with Alma and Gursky, thus doing a good deed without anybody knowing except God.

When the two receive the letter regarding their meeting, both are confused: Alma tries to discover which of the people she met during her searches could have sent her the note, while Leo comes to believe it was Alma who sent him the note, despite her being dead.

Leo settles himself on a park bench, waiting a long while for Alma to appear. He ponders his life, key moments from his past, the loss of his love, and what it means to be human. He imagines that he will die while he is waiting there, his own death and mortality being one of his preoccupations in the novel. When Alma finally appears, he and she are both confused, although at first Leo believes that she is his Alma from the past and that she is really just in his imagination. After he realizes that she doesn't look like his Alma, and he gets confirmation from a man walking by that the Alma who is there is actually real, Leo talks to her briefly about Bruno and Isaac, while Alma starts piecing together the puzzle of who Leo is. When Alma asks him if he ever loved a girl named Alma Mereminski, the old man finally feels a sense of transcendence in being recognized at long last, and instead of being able to respond to Alma's questions with words, he keeps tapping his fingers twice against her. She puts her head on his shoulder and hugs him, and he is finally able to speak again, saying her name three times and giving her her own feeling of transcendence at finally being recognized, too.

(Some readers believe that Leo has a heart attack and dies at this point, possibly because of Leo's earlier assumption that he is about to die, and also because he says during this meeting with Alma, "I felt my heart surge. I thought: I've lived this long. Please. A little longer won't kill me." A more compelling case can be made that the novel, for all its poignancy, simply ends with this mutually transcendent moment for these two characters.)

The last chapter is entitled "The Death of Leopold Gursky" and is identical with the last chapter of the book inside a book The History of Love, both being the self-written obituary of Leopold Gursky. By ending the novel this way, Krauss is richly alluding to earlier parts of the novel and to her theme of how words keep people alive for us, indeed, make people in danger of becoming invisible, visible. Zvi Litvinoff carried Leo's self-written obit in his pocket for years, as a talisman guarding against Leo's death. Litvinoff, when preparing History of Love for publication, insists that his editor include the Leo Gursky obit at the end, his way of ensuring that Leo will continue to "live" in the hearts of all readers of the book. And finally, Nicole Krauss includes the same obit at the end of her novel, as a way of urging all readers to keep this Leo, and all Leos, alive.

== Literary allusions in The History of Love ==
There are many thematically significant literary allusions in The History of Love. The writer Isaac Babel (1894–1940), as eulogized by Leo Gursky, has unmistakable affinities with Zvi Litvinoff's description of Leo's own writing style, and the description of Rosa Litvinoff's writing style in the early chapter "Forgive Me". The Polish writer Bruno Schulz (1892–1942) and his classic The Street of Crocodiles are mentioned several times in the novel, as is Nicanor Parra (1914–2018), whose 1954 book of antipoems is translated by Charlotte Singer and read by the mysterious Jacob Marcus. A passing reference to "Don Quixote" by Miguel de Cervantes (1547–1616) is also significant because Don Quixote is a novel that contains stand-alone stories within it, much in the same way that The History of Love contains excerpts of a mysterious book called "The History of Love." Other important literary allusions in the novel include references to James Joyce, Franz Kafka, Antoine de Saint-Exupéry, Leo Tolstoy, Rubén Darío and Pablo Neruda. Although he is never directly mentioned, the novel also alludes to Isaac Bashevis Singer in that Leo's son's name is Isaac and Alma's last name is Singer.

Miguel de Unamuno published a short story in Spanish, "A History of Love", with similar themes to the novel.

== Comparisons to Extremely Loud... ==
The History of Love was published in early 2005 as was Extremely Loud and Incredibly Close, written by Jonathan Safran Foer who had just married Krauss. Both books feature a precocious youth who set out in New York City on a quest. Both protagonists encounter old men with memories of World War II (a Holocaust survivor in Krauss and a survivor of the Dresden firebombing in Foer). Both old men recently suffered the death of long-lost sons. The stories also use some similar and uncommon literary techniques, such as unconventional typography.

== Film adaptation ==
The book was optioned by Warner Bros. in early 2005, and was set to be directed by Alfonso Cuarón. The film eventually began production in Montreal in 2015, directed by Radu Mihăileanu, and was released in 2016.

== Cultural impact and influence ==
The book was referenced in the 2021 production Tethered, a story about a grieving woman who has to relive her life with her husband before she can move on from his death. The History of Love is a favourite book of the main character, Jill. Her husband teases her about the book and as Jill moves backwards through time she is seen reading the book as a young woman.

== Notes ==
1. A real-life Bruno who is mentioned in the novel is Bruno Schulz, author of The Street of Crocodiles, a book that Alma read after Jacob Markus' letter said he was reading it for the third time. There are resemblances between Bruno Schulz and Leo's friend Bruno, whose last name is not given. Both were Jewish writers who were born in Poland. Leo says his friend Bruno died in 1941, which was the year of the death of Shultz's family and the beginning of Shultz's brutal imprisonment. Schulz was killed by a Nazi officer in 1942.
