= Nicole Krauss =

American novelist (born 1974)

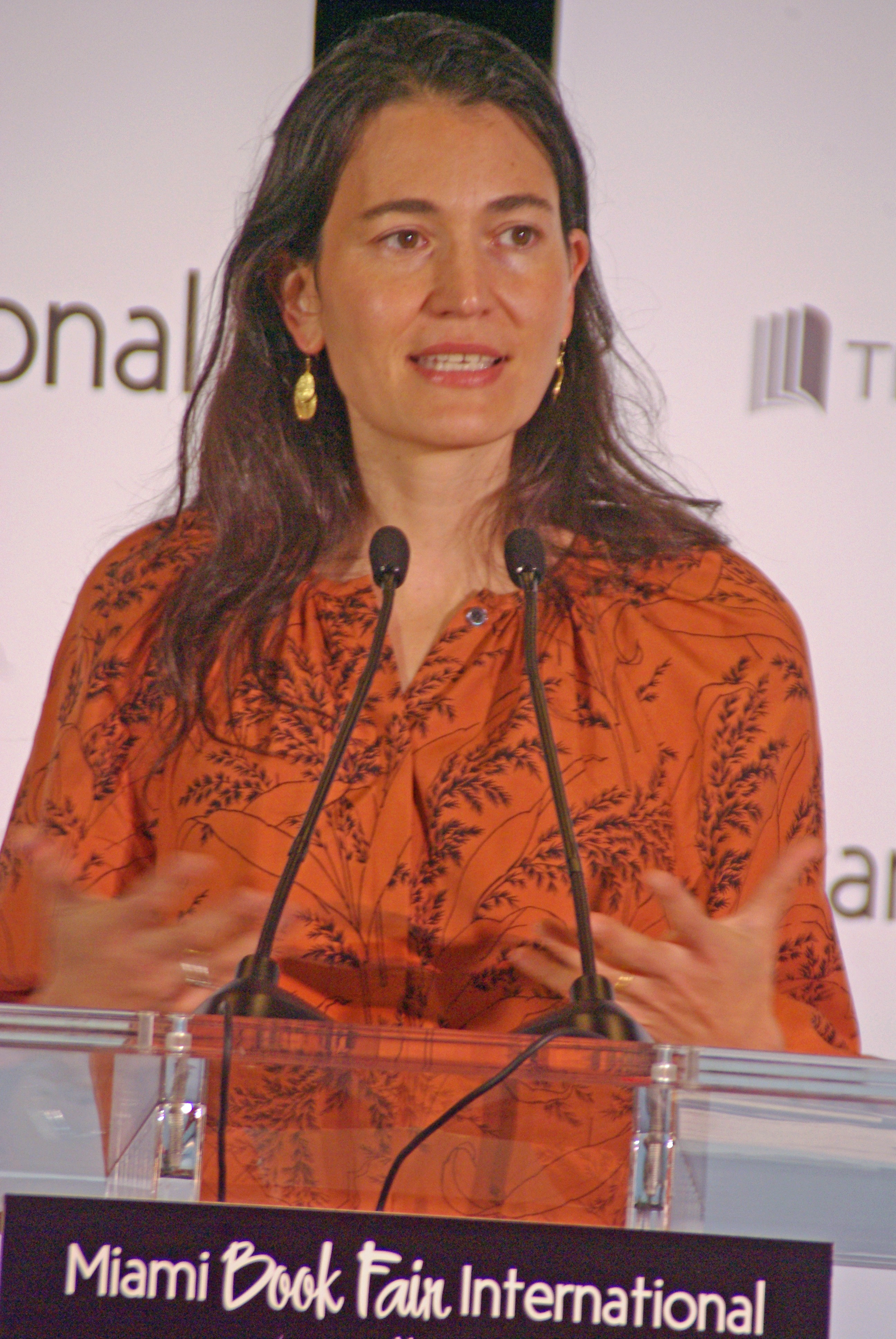
- Krauss in 2011
- Born: August 18, 1974 (age 52); New York City, US
- Education: Stanford University; Somerville College, Oxford; Courtauld Institute
- Occupations: Novelist and short story writer
- Spouse: Jonathan Safran Foer (m. 2004; div. 2014)
- Children: 2
- Writing career
- Notable works: Man Walks into a Room (2002); The History of Love (2005); Great House (2010); Forest Dark (2017); To Be a Man (2020)
- Notable awards: Wingate Literary Prize (2022); Sami Rohr Prize for Jewish Literature (2021); Anisfield-Wolf Book Award (2011); William Saroyan International Prize for Writing (2008); Prix du Meilleur Livre Étranger (France) (2006); Edward Lewis Wallant Award (2005)
- Movement: Postmodernism
- Website: www.nicolekrauss.com

Nicole Krauss (born August 18, 1974) is an American author best known for her four novels Man Walks into a Room (2002), The History of Love (2005), Great House (2010) and Forest Dark (2017), which have been translated into 35 languages. Her fiction has been published in The New Yorker, Harper's, Esquire, and Granta's Best American Novelists Under 40, and has been collected in The Best American Short Stories 2003, The Best American Short Stories 2008, The Best American Short Stories 2019 and The Best American Short Stories 2021.

In 2011, Krauss won an Anisfield-Wolf Book Award for Great House. A collection of her short stories, To Be a Man, was published in 2020 and won the Wingate Literary Prize in 2022.

== Early life ==
Krauss, who grew up on Long Island, New York, was born in Manhattan, New York City, to a British Jewish mother and an American Jewish father, an engineer and orthopedic surgeon who grew up partly in Israel. Krauss's maternal grandparents were born in Germany and Ukraine and later emigrated to London. Her paternal grandparents were born in Hungary and Slonim, Belarus, met in Israel, and later emigrated to New York. Many of these places are central to Krauss's 2005 novel, The History of Love, and the book is dedicated to her grandparents.

Krauss, who started writing when she was a teenager, wrote and published mainly poetry until she began her first novel in 2001.

In 1987, when Krauss's father traveled with his family to Switzerland to take up a medical fellowship in Basel, she was enrolled as a boarder in the International School of Geneva, where she pursued her secondary school studies in Year 9. Krauss's memories of that experience are conveyed in her autobiographical short story "Switzerland", published in 2020.

Krauss enrolled in Stanford University in 1992, and that fall she met Joseph Brodsky who worked closely with her on her poetry over the next three years. He also introduced her to the work of writers such as Italo Calvino and Zbigniew Herbert. In 1999, three years after Brodsky died, Krauss produced a documentary about his work for BBC Radio 3. She traveled to St. Petersburg where she stood in the "room and a half" where he grew up, made famous by his essay of that title. Krauss majored in English and graduated with honors, winning several undergraduate prizes for her poetry as well as the Dean's Award for academic achievement. She also curated a reading series with Fiona Maazel at the Russian Samovar, a restaurant in New York City co-founded by Roman Kaplan, Brodsky and Mikhail Baryshnikov.

In 1996 Krauss was awarded a Marshall Scholarship and enrolled in a master's program at Somerville College, Oxford, where she wrote a thesis on the American artist Joseph Cornell. During the second year of her scholarship she attended the Courtauld Institute in London, where she received a master's degree in art history, specializing in 17th-century Dutch art and writing a thesis on Rembrandt.

== Career ==
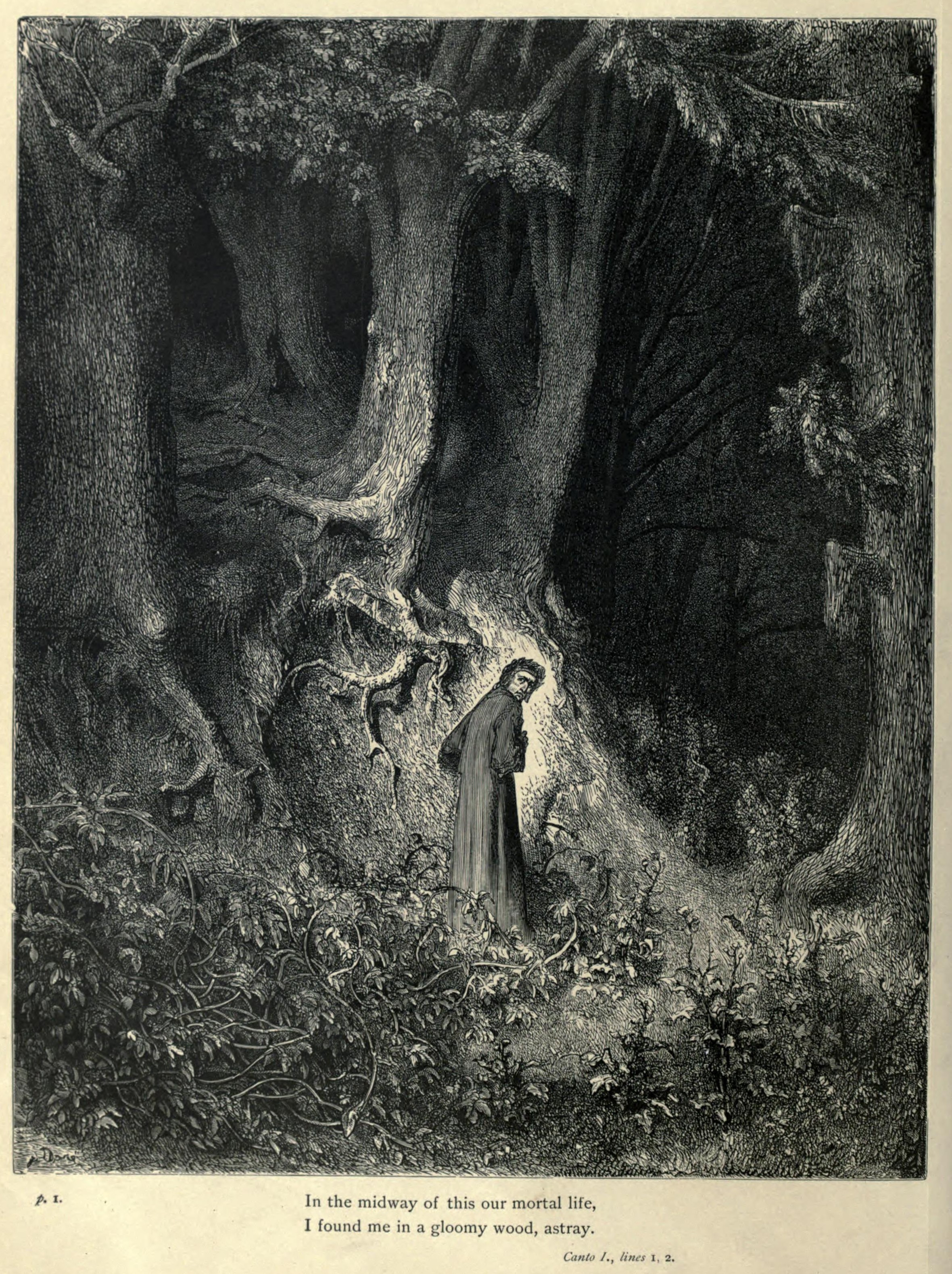
The title of Krauss's 2017 novel Forest Dark is derived from the opening lines of Dante's Inferno in which Dante is lost in a dark forest, shown here in this engraving by Gustave Doré

In 2002, Doubleday published Krauss's acclaimed first novel, Man Walks into a Room. A meditation on memory and personal history, solitude and intimacy, the novel won praise from Susan Sontag and was a finalist for a Los Angeles Times Book Prize. The movie rights to the novel were optioned by Richard Gere.

Krauss's second novel, The History of Love, was first published as an excerpt in The New Yorker in 2004, under the title The Last Words on Earth. The novel, published in 2005 in the United States by W. W. Norton, weaves together the stories of Leo Gursky, an 80-year-old Holocaust survivor from Slonim, the young Alma Singer who is coping with the death of her father, and the story of a lost manuscript also called The History of Love. The book was a 2006 finalist for the Orange Prize for Fiction and won the 2008 William Saroyan International Prize for Writing for fiction. A film of the book, directed by Radu Mihăileanu, was released in 2016.

In spring 2007, Krauss was Holtzbrinck Distinguished Visitor at the American Academy in Berlin.

Her third novel, Great House, connects the stories of four characters to a desk of many drawers that exerts a power over those who possess it or have given it away. It was named a finalist for the 2010 National Book Award for Fiction and was shortlisted for the Orange Prize 2011 and also won an Award from the Anisfield-Wolf Book Awards in 2011.

In 2015 it was reported that Krauss had signed a $4 million deal with HarperCollins to publish her next two works: a novel, and a book of short stories. The novel, Forest Dark, was published in 2017. Francesca Segal, writing in the Financial Times, describes it as a "richly layered tale of two lives" that explores "ideas of identity and belonging – and the lure of the Tel Aviv Hilton". The novel's title is derived from the opening lines of Dante's Inferno, as translated by Henry Wadsworth Longfellow. The collection of short stories, To Be a Man, was published in 2020 and won the 2022 Wingate Literary Prize.

In 2020, Krauss was one of three Artists-in-Residence at Columbia University's Mortimer B. Zuckerman Mind Brain Behavior Institute.

In 2021, Krauss was the recipient of the Sami Rohr Prize for Jewish Literature, and the first to receive the newly created Inspiration Award, introduced to mark the 15th anniversary of the prize.

== Themes ==
Krauss's work often explores the relationship between Jewish history and identity, the limited capacity of language and communication to produce understanding, loneliness, and memory. These themes are readily appreciable beginning in her first novel Man Walks into a Room, wherein the protagonist loses years of lived memory while retaining all cognitive function. Playing with tenets of cognitive neuroscience and metaphysics, Man Walks into a Room considers the relative roles of lived experience, materiality, and cognitive memory in shaping personal identity and being.

In a departure from her earlier work, Krauss's later novels progressively question and abandon traditional narrative structure in pursuit of themes more characteristic of late postmodern literature. Fragmentation and nonlinear narrative become increasingly present in her work through the use of multiple narrators whose narrative arcs may not directly meet but whose meanings are derived from resonance and pattern similarity (see The History of Love, Great House, Forest Dark). The History of Love and Forest Dark employ techniques of metafiction and intertextuality, questioning the veracity of the novel's form and antagonizing the traditional contract between reader and text. The co-protagonist of Forest Dark in particular is a novelist who shares the author's name and several biographical details, including reflections on a failed marriage to a man with whom the character has two children, considerations of the constraints of fiction, a fascination with Franz Kafka's life and writing, and a preoccupation with "Jewish mysticism, Israel and creation." In an August 2017 interview with The Guardian, Krauss is quoted saying:

“In a sense, the self is more or less an invention from beginning to end. What is more unreal, what is more a creation than the self? Why do we have such a heavy investment in knowing what is true and what isn’t true about people’s lives? Why is it even valid to make a distinction between autobiography, auto-fiction and fiction itself? What fiction doesn’t contain a deep reflection of the author’s perspective and memory and sense of the world?”

This evident blurring of the distinction between reality and fiction seems to reflect a rejection of objectivism in favor of sublime relativism, and unites Krauss with the wider gestalt common to her postmodern peers.

== Personal life ==
Krauss lives in Brooklyn, New York. She has two children, Sasha and Cy, and shares custody of them with their father, the novelist Jonathan Safran Foer. She and Foer married in 2004 and divorced in 2014. Krauss subsequently embarked on a five-year relationship with the Israeli journalist and novelist Gon Ben Ari, whom she met when she granted him an interview several years earlier.

Krauss enjoys swimming and dancing.

== Bibliography ==
=== Novels ===
- Nicole Krauss (2002). Man Walks into a Room (hardcover 1st ed.). Doubleday. ISBN 9780385503990. OCLC 48084093.
- —— (2005). The History of Love (hardcover ed.). W. W. Norton. ISBN 9780393060348. OCLC 919894482.
- —— (2010). Great House (hardcover 1st ed.). W. W. Norton. ISBN 9780393079982. OCLC 965579634.
- —— (2017). Forest Dark (hardcover 1st ed.). HarperCollins. ISBN 9780062430991. OCLC 967067570.

=== Short fiction collection ===
- —— (2020). To Be a Man (hardcover 1st ed.). HarperCollins. ISBN 9780062431028. OCLC 1200842896.

=== Stories ===
Title (Note: Short stories unless otherwise noted.)	Year	First published	Reprinted/collected
"Future Emergencies"	2002	Esquire (November 1, 2002)	Katrina Kenison; Walter Mosley, eds. (2003). The Best American Short Stories 2003. Houghton Mifflin.; Nicole Krauss (2020). To Be a Man: Stories. HarperCollins (USA); Bloomsbury Publishing (UK).
"The last words on Earth"	2004	The New Yorker (February 9, 2004)	An excerpt from Krauss's 2005 novel, The History of Love
"My painter"	2007	Granta 97: Best of Young American Novelists 2 (April 16, 2007)	
"From the desk of Daniel Varsky"	2007	Harper's Magazine (June 2007)	Heidi Pitlor; Salman Rushdie, eds. (2008). The Best American Short Stories 2008. Houghton Mifflin.
"The young painters"	2010	The New Yorker 86/18 (June 28, 2010)	
"An arrangement of light"	2012	Nicole Krauss (2012). An arrangement of light. San Francisco: Byliner. ISBN 9781614520405. (Note: Kasia Mychajlowycz (June 15, 2012). "Nicole Krauss at Luminato 2012". The Toronto Review of Books. Krauss introduced and read this novella at Luminato, Toronto's Festival of Arts and Creativity)	
"Zusya on the roof"	2013	The New Yorker 88/46 (February 4, 2013)	Nicole Krauss (2020). To Be a Man: Stories. HarperCollins (USA); Bloomsbury Publishing (UK).
"I Am Asleep but My Heart Is Awake"	2013	The New Republic (December 2013)	Nicole Krauss (2020). To Be a Man: Stories. HarperCollins (USA); Bloomsbury Publishing (UK).
"Seeing Ershadi"	2018	The New Yorker (March 5, 2018) (Note: Nicole Krauss. Seeing Ershadi, The New Yorker (March 5, 2018). Retrieved November 15, 2019.)	Anthony Doerr; Heidi Pitlor, eds. (2019). The Best American Short Stories 2019. Houghton Mifflin.; Nicole Krauss (2020). To Be a Man: Stories. HarperCollins (USA); Bloomsbury Publishing (UK).
"End of Days"	2020	Nicole Krauss (2020). To Be a Man: Stories. HarperCollins (USA); Bloomsbury Publishing (UK).	
"Switzerland"	2020	Nicole Krauss (September 21, 2020). "Switzerland". The New Yorker. 96 (28): 52–58. Retrieved May 19, 2023.	Jesmyn Ward; Heidi Pitlor, eds. (2021). The Best American Short Stories 2021. Houghton Mifflin.; Nicole Krauss (2020). To Be a Man: Stories. HarperCollins (USA); Bloomsbury Publishing (UK).
"To Be a Man"	2020	The Atlantic (October 2, 2020) (Note: Nicole Krauss. To Be a Man, The Atlantic (October 2, 2020). Retrieved December 2, 2020.)	Nicole Krauss (2020). To Be a Man: Stories. HarperCollins (USA); Bloomsbury Publishing (UK).
"Shelter"	2022	The New Yorker (September 26, 2022) (Note: Nicole Krauss. Shelter, The New Yorker (September 26, 2022). Retrieved August 26, 2026.)	
"Long Island"	2023	The New Yorker 99/13 (May 15, 2023)	
"Lamentations"	2025	The Atlantic (July 6, 2025) (Note: Nicole Krauss. Lamentations, The Atlantic (October 2, 2020). Retrieved August 26, 2026.)	

=== Essays and reporting ===
- Nicole Krauss (Winter 2003). "Philip Guston: the first painter after the last" (PDF). Modern Painters: 86–91. Archived from the original (PDF) on March 4, 2016.
- — (April 18, 2005). "My summer in Poland". Are We There Yet?. The New Yorker.
- — (2011). "Preface". In Aleksandar Hemon (ed.). Best European Fiction 2012. Dalkey Archive Press. ISBN 9781564786807.
- — (March 24, 2011). "Writer's block: the end of bookstores". The New Republic.

Book reviews

Date	Review article	Work(s) reviewed
1999	Nicole Krauss (November 7, 1999). "Future Tense". Los Angeles Times.	Joseph Brodsky (1995). Discovery. New York: Farrar, Straus & Giroux. ISBN 978-1437964127.
2011	Nicole Krauss (September 29, 2011). "Antwerp by Roberto Bolaño – review". The Guardian.	Roberto Bolaño (2010). Antwerp. New York: New Directions Publishing. ISBN 978-0811217170.

———————

== Awards and accolades ==
- Wingate Literary Prize winner, 2022
- Sami Rohr Prize for Jewish Literature Inspiration Award, 2021
- Anisfield-Wolf Book Awards winner, 2011
- Orange Prize shortlist (U.K.), 2011
- National Book Award finalist, 2010
- Selected as one of The New Yorker's "20 Under 40" writers to watch, 2010
- William Saroyan International Prize for Writing, 2008
- Granta's Best American Novelists under 40, 2007
- Prix du Meilleur Livre Étranger (Best Foreign Book Prize) (France), 2006
- Medicis Prize shortlist (France), 2006
- Femina Prize shortlist (France), 2006
- Orange Prize shortlist (U.K.), 2006
- Edward Lewis Wallant Award, 2005
- Named "Best and Brightest" writer by Esquire, 2002
