= To Be a Man (short story collection) =

Short story collection by Nicole Krauss

- Front cover of UK hardcover edition
- Author: Nicole Krauss
- Language: English
- Genre: Short stories; Postmodernism
- Publisher: Harper
- Publication date: 2020
- Publication place: United States
- Media type: Print (hardback & paperback), ebook, audiobook
- Pages: 240 pp (hardcover)
- ISBN: 978-0-06-243102-8
- Preceded by: Forest Dark (2017)

To Be a Man: Stories is a collection of short stories by American writer Nicole Krauss. It was published in 2020 by Harper in the United States and by Bloomsbury in the United Kingdom.
