= Nicanor Parra =

Chilean poet and physicist (1914–2018)

Nicanor Parra Sandoval
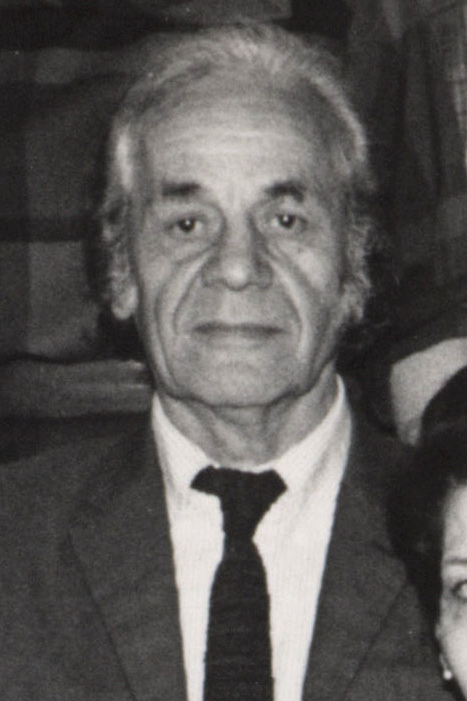
- Born: Nicanor Segundo Parra Sandoval; 5 September 1914; San Fabián de Alico, Chile
- Died: 23 January 2018 (aged 103); La Reina, Chile
- Occupation: Poet
- Awards: Miguel de Cervantes Prize (2011)

Nicanor Segundo Parra Sandoval (5 September 1914 – 23 January 2018) was a Chilean physicist and poet. He has been considered one of the most influential Spanish-language Chilean poets of the 20th century.

Parra described himself as an "anti-poet" on account of his distaste for poetry's pompous pretences. After his recitations, he would say: "Me retracto de todo lo dicho." ("I take back everything I've said.")

== Life ==
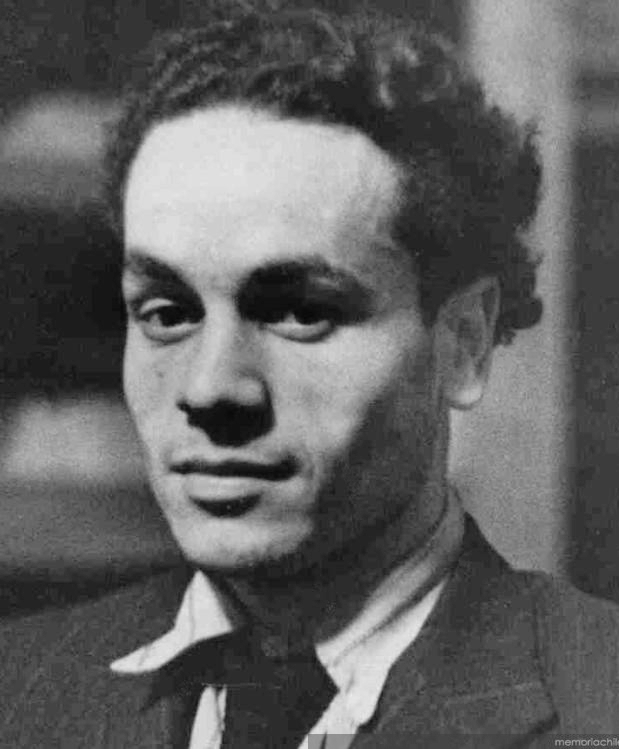
Parra in 1935

Parra, the son of a schoolteacher, was born in 1914 in San Fabián de Alico, near Chillán, in Chile. He came from the artistically prolific Parra family of performers, musicians, artists, and writers. His sister, Violeta Parra, was a folk singer, as was his brother Roberto Parra Sandoval.

In 1933, he entered the Instituto Pedagógico of the University of Chile, where he qualified as a teacher of mathematics and physics in 1938, one year after the publication of his first book, Cancionero sin Nombre. After teaching in Chilean secondary schools, in 1943 he enrolled in Brown University in the United States to study physics. In 1948, he attended Oxford University to study cosmology. He returned to Chile as a professor at the Universidad de Chile in 1952. Parra served as a professor of theoretical physics at the University of Chile from 1952 to 1991, and was a visiting professor at Louisiana State University, New York University, and Yale University. He read his poetry in England, France, Russia, Mexico, Cuba, and the United States. He published dozens of books.

As a young man, he was promoted by Gabriela Mistral and Pablo Neruda. He came to Mistral's attention when she visited Chillán. The national anthem was played in her honor, as Latin America's first Nobel laureate; at its conclusion, Parra leapt onto the stage and recited a poem he'd written for her the previous night. Mistral, standing for the anthem, remained standing until Parra finished, and later introduced him to important people in Santiago as a poet of future global renown. Subsequently, Neruda arranged for Parra's collection Poemas y Antipoemas to be published in Buenos Aires, in 1954.

Poemas y Antipoemas is a classic of Latin American literature, one of the most influential Spanish poetry collections of the twentieth century. It is cited as an inspiration by American Beat writers such as Allen Ginsberg.

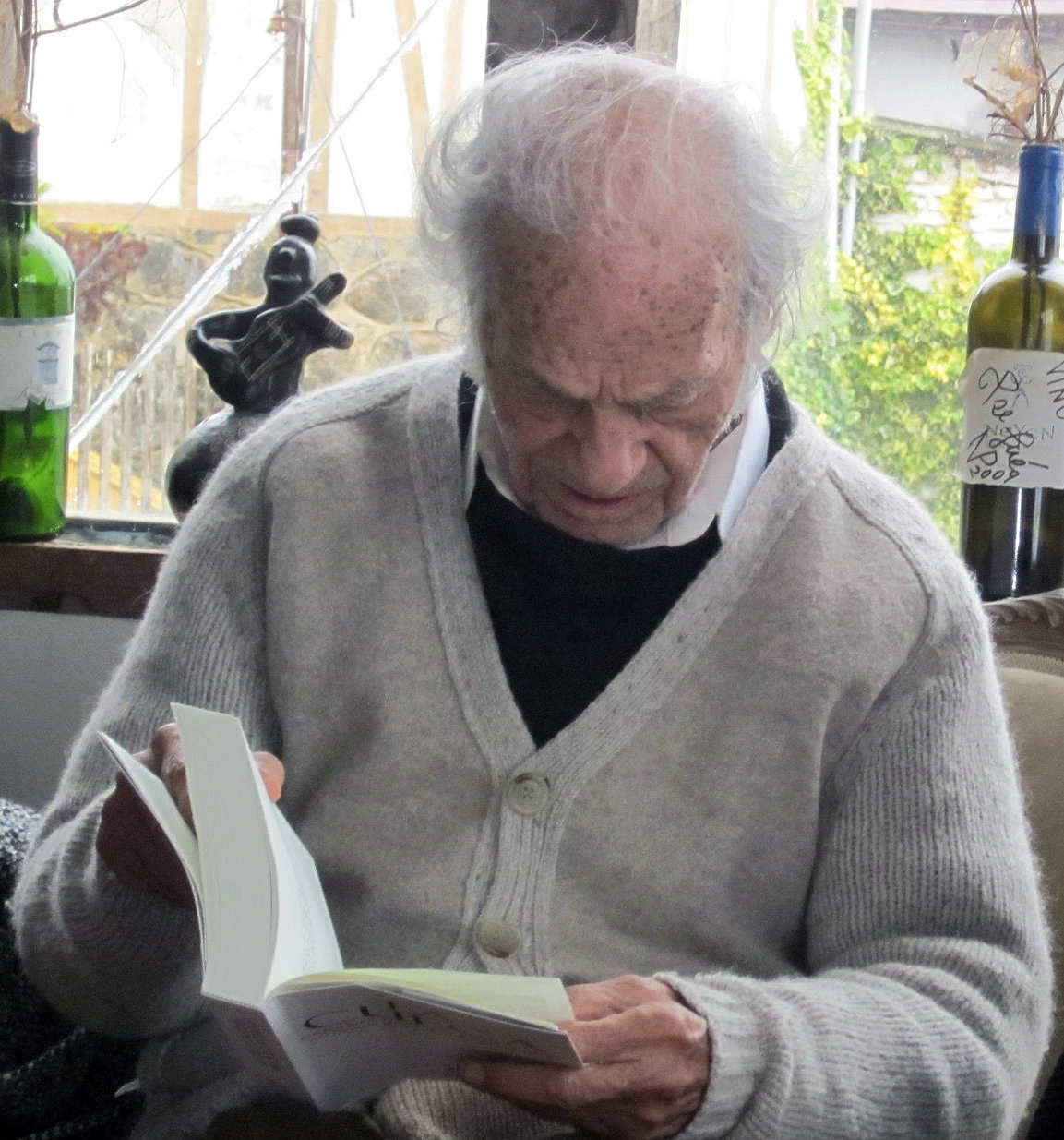
Nicanor Parra at the age of 100

A fictionalized version of Parra appeared in Alejandro Jodorowsky's autobiographical film Endless Poetry (2016).

== Death ==
Parra died on 23 January 2018, in La Reina in Santiago, at the age of 103.

== Style ==
Parra's poetry changed greatly over time. For a short period in his youth, at the end of the 1930s, he was a proponent of "poetry of clarity," a movement strongly inspired by the recent assassination of Federico García Lorca, created as a critical response to the hermeticism and subjectivity of the historical avant-garde movements led by Huidobro, Neruda, or the new surrealist poets of La Mandrágora.

After leaving this pursuit, instead of adhering himself to Socialist realism, which he criticized for its poor credibility and its doctrinal abstraction, Parra decided to continue on a path that was more Avant-garde or even post-Avant-garde. Aided by his scientific background, he was particularly interested in the structures and mechanisms of creation. His poetry is markedly critical, questioning, and anticlerical. Along with his Postmodernist and analytical anti-poems, he had poems that were ecological, and others that came from oral traditions. Through his usage of absurdism, humor, street art, and popular culture, Parra was characterized by democratizing poetry, bringing it to readers of many different sociocultural backgrounds.

As for his use of metre, in his earlier poems he utilized octosyllable to write romances, and hendecasyllable for parodic sonnets, although he also experimented with free verse. His poems exhibited strong variation in both voice and style. In the 1990s, he started to use a more relaxed form of iambic pentameter, favoring fluency in his translations of William Shakespeare.

Parra was very demanding with his poems before publishing them, so that future publications of his poems would have very few changes. Despite this, he seemed particularly unconcerned about punctuation, which tended to vary between editions.

== Awards ==
As far as I know, only the Mexican poet Mario Santiago has made a lucid reading of his work. We others have only seen a dark meteorite.

— Roberto Bolaño about Nicanor Parra in Entre paréntesis

Parra was proposed on four occasions for the Nobel Prize in Literature. On 1 December 2011, Parra won the Spanish Ministry of Culture's Cervantes Prize, the most important literary prize in the Spanish-speaking world. On 7 June 2012, he won the Pablo Neruda Ibero-American Poetry Award.

== List of works ==
- Cancionero sin nombre (Songbook without a Name), 1937.
- Poemas y antipoemas (Poems and Antipoems), 1954; Nascimento, 1956; Cátedra, 2005, ISBN 978-84-376-0777-1
- La cueca larga (The Long Cueca), 1958
- Versos de salón (Parlor Verses), 1962
- Manifiesto (Manifesto), 1963
- Canciones rusas (Russian Songs), 1967
- Obra gruesa (Thick Works), 1969
- Los profesores (The Teachers), 1971
- Artefactos (Artifacts), 1972
- Sermones y prédicas del Cristo de Elqui (Sermons and Teachings of the Christ of Elquí), 1977
- Nuevos sermones y prédicas del Cristo de Elqui (New Sermons and Teachings of the Christ of Elquí), 1979
- El anti-Lázaro (The Anti-Lazarus), 1981
- Plaza Sésamo (Sesame Street), 1981
- Poema y antipoema de Eduardo Frei (Poem and Antipoem of Eduardo Frei), 1982
- Cachureos, ecopoemas, guatapiques, últimas prédicas, 1983
- Chistes parRa desorientar a la policía/poesía (Jokes to Confuse the Police/Poetry), 1983
- Coplas de Navidad (Christmas Couplets), 1983
- Poesía política (Political Poetry), 1983
- Hojas de Parra (Grape Leaves / Pages of Parra (Spanish pun)), 1985
- Nicanor Parra: biografía emotiva (Nicanor Parra: Emotional Biography), Ediciones Rumbos, 1988
- Poemas para combatir la calvicie (Poems to Combat Baldness), 1993
- Páginas en blanco (White Pages), 2001
- Lear, Rey & Mendigo (Lear, King & Beggar), 2004
- Obras completas I & algo + (Complete Works I and Something More), 2006
- Discursos de Sobremesa (After Dinner Declarations), 2006
- Obras Completas II & algo + (Complete Works II and Something More), 2011
- Así habló Parra en El Mercurio, entrevistas dadas al diario chileno entre 1968 y 2007 (Thus Spoke Parra in El Mercurio, Interviews Given to the Chilean Newspaper Between 1968 and 2007), 2012
- El último apaga de luz (The Last One to Leave Turns Off the Lights), 2017

English translations

- Anti-Poems. City Lights Pocket Poets. Translated by Elliott, Jorge. San Francisco: City Lights Books. 1960. OCLC 4718688.
- Poems and antipoems. Translated by Alegría, Fernando; Merwin, W. S.; Levertov, Denise; Williams, Miller; Merton, Thomas; Williams, William Carlos; Ginsberg, Allen; Laughlin, James; Ferlinghetti, Lawrence. New York City: New Directions. 1967. OCLC 499208.
- Emergency Poems. Translated by Williams, Miller. New York City: New Directions. 1972. OCLC 357002.
- Antipoems, new and selected. New York City: New Directions. 1985. ISBN 0811209601. OCLC 12104359.
- Antipoems: How to Look Better and Feel Great. Translated by Liz Werner. New York City: New Directions. 2004. ISBN 978-0-8112-1597-8. OCLC 1126026496.
- After-Dinner Declarations. Translated by Dave Oliphant. Host. 2009. ISBN 978-0-924047-63-3.
