= The History of Love (film) =

- Film poster
- Directed by: Radu Mihăileanu
- Screenplay by: Radu Mihăileanu; Marcia Romano
- Based on: The History of Love by Nicole Krauss
- Produced by: Marc-Antoine Robert; Xavier Rigault; Radu Mihăileanu
- Starring: Derek Jacobi; Sophie Nélisse; Gemma Arterton; Elliott Gould
- Cinematography: Laurent Dailland
- Edited by: Ludo Troch
- Music by: Armand Amar
- Production companies: 2.4.7. Films; Oï Oï Oï Productions; Libra Film
- Distributed by: Wild Bunch Distribution (France)
- Release dates: 7 September 2016 (Deauville); 9 November 2016 (France)
- Running time: 134 minutes
- Countries: France; Canada; Romania; United States; Belgium
- Languages: English; Yiddish
- Budget: €15 million
- Box office: $382,687

The History of Love is a 2016 internationally co-produced romantic drama film directed by Radu Mihăileanu and written by Mihăileanu and Marcia Romano, based on the 2005 novel of the same name by Nicole Krauss. The film stars Derek Jacobi, Sophie Nélisse, Gemma Arterton and Elliott Gould.

== Cast ==
- Derek Jacobi as Léo Gursky
- Mark Rendall as young Léo Gursky
- Sophie Nélisse as Alma Singer
- Gemma Arterton as Alma Mereminski
- Elliott Gould as Bruno Leibovitch
- Corneliu Ulici as young Bruno Leibovitch
- Torri Higginson as Charlotte Singer
- William Ainscough as Bird Singer
- Alex Ozerov as Misha Strumann
- Jamie Bloch as Zoey Schwartz
- Claudiu Maier as Zvi Litvinoff
- Daniel Matmor as Dr. Zilberstein
- Jean-Carl Boucher as Herman Connor
- Simona Maican as Rosa
- Julian Bailey as Jeff
- Cary Lawrence as Hilary
- Peter Spence as Bernard Moritz

== Production ==
The History of Love was shot in various locations, including Montreal, New York City, Cluj-Napoca and Bucharest.
