= Elias Petropoulos =

Greek author and urban historian (1928–2003)

- Born: 26 June 1928; Athens, Greece
- Died: 3 September 2003 (aged 75); Paris, France

Philosophical work
- School: Decadence, folklore

Elias Petropoulos (Greek: Ηλίας Πετρόπουλος, romanized: Ilías Petrópoulos; June 26, 1928 – September 3, 2003) was a Greek author, folklorist, and urban historian. A self-described "urban anthropologist", he wrote on aspects of Greek life that were rarely considered fit objects for serious study, including the subcultures, slangs, and music of homosexuals, drug users, and criminals.

Petropoulos was an early proponent of anti-poetry.

Under the Greek military junta of 1967–74, some of his books were regarded as immoral, resulting in fines and jail terms and ultimately in his decision to leave Greece and live permanently in France.

== Biography ==
Petropoulos was born in Athens on 26 June 1928, but spent his early years in Thessaloniki, where his father, a junior civil servant, was transferred when Elias was six. They lived in an Ottoman house that his father transformed by eliminating the more typical Turkish elements. According to anthropologist Christos Panagiotopoulos, the young Petropoulos did not appreciate the restyling of the house, an incident that will return in his late work as an example of how, by rejecting the Ottoman heritage and claiming for their country a “European” one, the Greeks ended up sacrificing what had become distinctive characters of their culture and even of their food.

As he later remembered, Thessaloniki was the center of Greek left-wing thought, and as a young man Petropoulos acquired there the leftist political ideas he will keep throughout his life. During World War II, Petropoulos was active in the Greek resistance movement against Nazi occupation. His father was killed at the front. In 1947, during the Greek Civil War, he was briefly imprisoned for his participation in the Democratic Army of Greece.

Although he did not finish high school, he was able to pass the examination and be admitted in the faculty of Law of the Aristotelian University of Thessaloniki, which he left just before graduation. He worked as a civil servant for the city of Thessaloniki, but in 1949 he was fired from his post after having been accused of being a Communist, after which he spent 8 years unemployed and marginalized.

He befriended since he was a teenager the songwriter Vassilis Tsitsanis, who led him to a lifelong interest for the popular Greek musical form rebetiko, of which he became the leading historian. In 1959, he published his first major treatise, concerning three significant figures of contemporary Greek culture, eponymously titled Elytis Moralis Tsarouchis. In the following ten years, he embarked in a thorough and systematic exploration of Greek marginal subcultures. He befriended homosexuals, prostitutes, rebetiko musicians, hashish smokers, petty thieves, and others who populated the margins of Greek society. He studied their culture, language and customs, and wrote about them. He also described the design of the ubiquitous balconies, courtyards, ironwork, and windows of Greek buildings, the methods and vocabulary of preparing coffee and the art of telling fortunes from coffee-grounds, the traditional layout and functioning of brothels, the role of bean soup as an unheralded Greek national dish, the specialized slang of the Greek homosexual scene — it is claimed that his book Kaliarda (Καλιαρντά) was the first dictionary of gay slang in any language — the Greek drug users' underworld and the criminal subculture.

The publishing of this controversial material that is often irreverent towards the establishment and defies attempts at censorship, earned Petropoulos three different jail sentences during the dictatorship of the colonels. Petropoulos was the only Greek during the 7-year dictatorship who had an identity card stating that he was an atheist (religious beliefs were obligatorily mentioned on Greek identity documents until recent years).

In 1974, the continuous persecution that outlasted the dictatorship forced him to self-exile in Paris, where he continued writing and publishing ethnographic works. In 1979, Petropoulos published The Manual of the Good Thief (Το εγχειρίδιο του καλού κλέφτη), a satirical but accurate description of the criminal underworld, the abusive practices of the police, and the state of the Greek prisons. The book was banned in Greece, causing international protests. Because of the book, Petropoulos was tried in absentia in Greece and sentenced to eighteen months in jail, which led him to decide to remain in Paris, where he realized his old dream of studying Turkology and the Turkish language at the École pratique des hautes études. He continued to write on Greek criminals and homosexuals, publishing in Paris books that will slowly be accepted and acknowledged in Greece.

On September 3, 2003, he died of cancer in Paris at the age of 75. According to his will, his body was cremated and his ashes were thrown in a sewer by his lifelong partner Mary Koukoulès. This scene was captured on film in the 2004 documentary Elias Petropoulos: A world underground (Ηλίας Πετρόπουλος: Ένας κόσμος υπόγειος), directed by Kalliopi Legaki. The documentary contains the last interview given by Petropoulos and an overview of his life and work.

== Published works ==
Petropoulos was the author of a large number of books, most of which have not been translated into English and many of which are out of print. He also published poetry, both original and in translation. The following select bibliography attempts to list all of his books in English or French, and the major works in Greek.

Books by Elias Petropoulos:

- Καλιαρντά 2nd. ed, Athens, Kedros, 1971.
- The Graves of Greece. Paris, Private Bibliophile's Edition, 1979.
- A macabre song: testimony of the goy Elias Petropoulos concerning anti-Jewish sentiments in Greece. With a postscriptum by Pierre Vidal-Naquet, texts translated from the Greek and from the French by John Taylor. Paris: [s.n.], 1985 (Paris: Atelier Mérat)
- Old Salonica. Athens, Kedros, 1980.
- Rebetika: songs from the Old Greek Underworld. Trans. by John Taylor, illustrated by Alekos Fassianos. London, Alcyon Art Editions, 1992. ISBN 1-874455-01-5
- Ρεμπέτικα τραγούδια. 2nd ed., Athens, Kedros, 1983.
- Songs of the Greek Underworld: The Rebetika Tradition. Trans. with introduction and add. text by Ed Emery. London, Saqui Books, 2000.
- Mirror for You: Collected Poems (1967-1999). Trans. by John Taylor. Cycladic Press, 2023. ISBN 9780646875330

Books about Elias Petropoulos:

- Harsh Out of Tenderness: The Greek Poet & Urban Folklorist Elias Petropoulos, by John Taylor, Sydney: Cycladic Press, 2020.
- Ηλίας Πετρόπουλος, ο τεχνιτής της διαστροφής, by Yiannis Vasilakakos, Athens: Odos Panos, 2018.

Film about Elias Petropoulos

- Elias Petropoulos – An Underground World. Director: Kalliopi Legaki; Producer: Maria Gentekou, 2005.

== See also ==
- Anti-poetry
