= Man Walks into a Room =

2002 novel by Nicole Krauss

- Author: Nicole Krauss
- Language: English
- Genre: Novel
- Publisher: Doubleday
- Publication date: 2002
- Publication place: United States
- ISBN: 9781407413365
- OCLC: 809413112
- Followed by: The History of Love (2005)

Man Walks into a Room, published in the United States by Doubleday on May 1, 2002, is the first novel by American writer Nicole Krauss.

Set in 1957 and the present day, the novel, which is a meditation on memory and personal history, solitude and intimacy, tells the story of Samson Greene, a young and popular professor at Columbia University in New York City, who is found wandering in the Nevada desert with no memory of his previous life.

== Plot ==
Samson Greene is found wandering in the Nevada desert and is identified by the ID in his wallet as he has no recollection of who he is or how he got there. Tests reveal that Samson has a cherry-sized tumour in his brain and after the tumour is removed and found to be benign, Samson finds that he has no memories past the age of 12.

Although his wife, Anna, holds out hope that Samson will eventually recover and remember her, Samson does not. Eventually the strain between them grows great as Samson grows less fond of Anna and bonds with a former student of his, Lana. Samson and his wife decides to separate and Samson sublets an apartment from Lana, who has temporarily moved to attend film school at UCLA. He receives a call from Dr. Ray Malcolm who invites him to come to Los Angeles and be a part of his experimental procedures.

While in Los Angeles being tested Samson meets Donald, a man who is working with Ray and his team so that they can extract one of his memories. After Donald's memory is extracted Samson agrees to be the first subject to have a memory transferred into his brain. When the procedure succeeds he is left with violent images of nuclear weapons testing which upset him and cause him to leave the clinic and search for Donald.

In Vegas, when Samson is unable to contact Donald he returns to the hospital where they removed his brain tumour and steals the slides with the samples of his tumour on them before running to his great-uncle Max's retirement home, hoping to find out where his mother is buried.

While visiting Max, who has dementia, Samson realizes his mother was cremated and buried under the magnolia tree in his childhood home. He returns there and buries the slides of his tumour in the ground with his mother.

== Reception ==
The novel was critically acclaimed. Joy Press, writing in The Village Voice, said: "Krauss is a fluent, thoughtful writer who takes on a lot of complex ideas and rarely loses her grip on them... Man Walks into a Room is a chilling addition to the annals of amnesia lit. It's a novel that grapples with the ephemeral experience of being human and the realization that we create a lifetime of memories that vanish when we do". Gillian Flynn, in a review for Entertainment Weekly, described Krauss's prose as "casually dazzling, as are the ideas she explores through Samson". The novel won praise from Susan Sontag and was a finalist for the Los Angeles Times Book Prize.

Clay Smith, in a review for The Austin Chronicle, said: "This is a novel of ideas, with a plot that occasionally reads like a 'plot of emptiness,' as Samson once considers describing his own mind to a taxi driver. Krauss is an ambitious writer with a penchant for putting as many observations as possible in her first novel, when just a description would be sufficient... Often enough in Man Walks into a Room, you get plot description and a lesson. After finishing the last page, however, what endures is the recognition that Krauss observes with discerning, moving eyes that don't miss a thing."
