= Great House (novel) =

2010 novel by Nicole Krauss

- First edition
- Author: Nicole Krauss
- Language: English
- Genre: Novel, Postmodernism
- Publisher: W.W. Norton & Company
- Publication date: October 12, 2010
- Publication place: United States
- Media type: Print (Paperback) and E-Book
- Pages: 289 pg (paperback)
- ISBN: 978-0-393-07998-2
- Preceded by: The History of Love (2005)
- Followed by: Forest Dark (2017)

Great House is the third novel by the American writer Nicole Krauss, published on October 12, 2010 by W. W. Norton & Company. Early versions of the first chapter were published in Harper's ("From the Desk of Daniel Varsky", 2007), Best American Short Stories 2008, and The New Yorker ("The Young Painters", June 2010). Great House was a finalist for the 2010 National Book Award in Fiction.

== Book description ==
For 25 years, a reclusive American novelist has been writing at the desk she inherited from a young Chilean poet who disappeared at the hands of Pinochet’s secret police; one day a girl claiming to be the poet’s daughter arrives to take it away, sending the writer’s life reeling. Across the ocean, in the leafy suburbs of London, a man caring for his dying wife discovers, among her papers, a lock of hair that unravels a terrible secret. In Jerusalem, an antiques dealer slowly reassembles his father’s study, plundered by the Nazis in Budapest in 1944.

Linking these stories is a desk of many drawers that exerts a power over those who possess it or have given it away.

The book's title, Great House, is the name by which the yeshiva in Yavne, founded by the first-century rabbi Yochanan ben Zakkai, became known after his death. Its source is this passage from the Bible, in the Second Book of Kings, chapter 25, verse 9: "He burned the house of God, the king's house, and all the houses of Jerusalem; even every great house he burned with fire."

== Dedication ==
The book is dedicated to Krauss's two children, both boys.

== Reception ==
Patrick Ness of The Guardian described the book as "subtle and fractured, almost demanding a second reading to put all the pieces together. Mainly, though, Great House is a meditation on loss and memory and how they construct our lives...Great House is a smart, serious, sharply written novel of great care and yearning." Rebecca Newberger Goldstein of The New York Times described the book as "a high-wire performance, only the wire has been replaced by an exposed nerve, and you hold your breath, and she does not fall." Janet Byrne of Huffington Post stated "It's a daunting undertaking, one that not every writer under 40 would choose or can do justice to, but Krauss's talent runs deep. And she cannot write a bad sentence: pound for pound, the sentences alone deliver epiphany upon epiphany."
