= Forest Dark =

2017 novel by Nicole Krauss

- Cover of UK hardback first edition
- Author: Nicole Krauss
- Language: English
- Genre: Novel, Postmodernism
- Publisher: Bloomsbury (UK); HarperCollins (United States)
- Publication date: August 24, 2017 (UK); September 12, 2017 (United States)
- ISBN: 978-1-4088-7178-2
- OCLC: 1003643528
- Preceded by: Great House (2010)

Forest Dark is the fourth novel by the American writer Nicole Krauss. It was published on August 24, 2017 in the United Kingdom and on September 12, 2017 in the United States. The book, which is set in New York City and Israel, is dedicated to Krauss's father (Note: Krauss's father grew up partly in Israel. Brown, Hannah (May 14, 2010). "The history of Nicole Krauss". Jerusalem Post.) and its title is derived from the opening lines of Dante's Inferno, as translated by Henry Wadsworth Longfellow. (Note: "Midway upon the journey of our life I found myself within a forest dark, For the straightforward pathway had been lost.") Its chief characters are lawyer Jules Epstein, who is wealthy, divorced and retired, and Nicole, an internationally acclaimed novelist and mother of two sons who is in a failing marriage.

== Plot ==
Jules Epstein, a wealthy retiree, goes missing in Tel Aviv to the distress of his three children. Prior to his disappearance triggered perhaps by the death of his parents, and his divorce from his wife, Epstein had been in the process of giving away both his money and his earthly possessions.

Meanwhile, in New York City, novelist Nicole is living a crisis herself as she is aware that her marriage is failing but cannot find it within herself to work on saving it. After hearing a program on the radio in which a physicist explains the concept of the multiverse Nicole begins to wonder if all life is not dreamed up from one location, believing that her location could be the Hilton Tel Aviv where she and her family have visited frequently. After her father's cousin tells her of a man who died there, Nicole abruptly makes the decision to go the hotel herself as research for a new novel.

== Reception ==
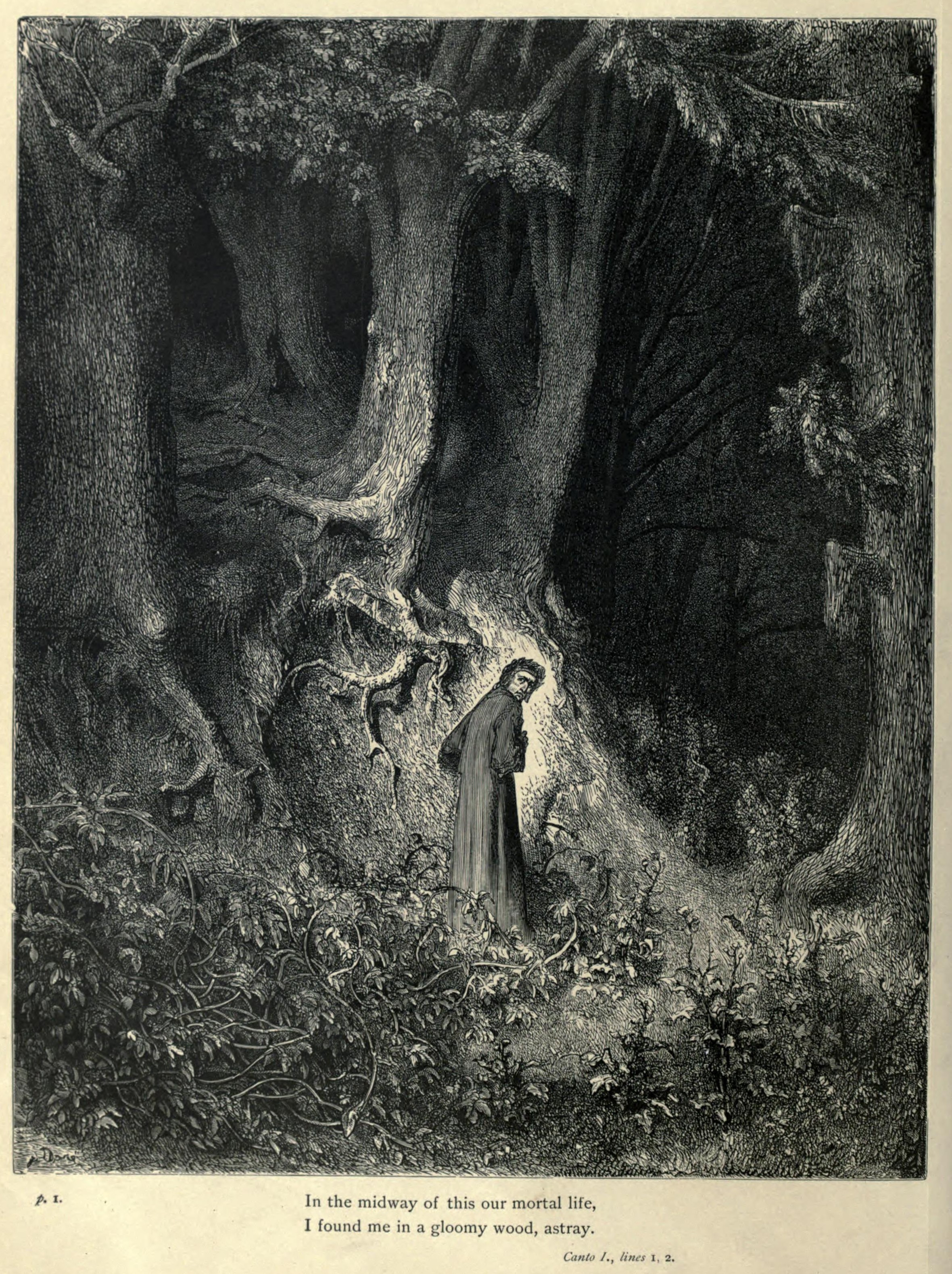
The novel's title is derived from the opening lines of Dante's Inferno in which Dante is lost in a dark forest, shown here in this engraving by Gustave Doré

Francesca Angelini, writing in The Sunday Times, called it "a daring novel" and Sarah Hughes, reviewing the book for the i newspaper, described Forest Dark as "a novel of ideas that is impossible to put down".

Francesca Segal, writing in the Financial Times, said that the novel's "tale of two lives" explores "ideas of identity and belonging – and the lure of the Tel Aviv Hilton". She described it as "a richly layered masterpiece; creative, profound, insightful, deeply serious, effortlessly elegant, both human and humane. Krauss is a poet and a philosopher, and this latest work does what only the very best fiction can do – startles, challenges and enlightens the reader, while showing the familiar world anew".

Maureen Corrigan, for NPR, said: "The two separate plotlines about these two questers — Nicole and Epstein — ultimately intersect, but that's the only predictable aspect of this scramble of a novel. There are digressions here into Franz Kafka, René Descartes, Sigmund Freud, fairy tales and film. Sections of the novel are walled off from each another, as disconnected as that row-after-row of rooms in the Tel Aviv Hilton. Readers should just go along for the choppy ride, because the pleasure of Krauss' writing isn't located in the story. Instead, it's the wayward precision of her language that draws us into the desert, 'the forest dark' and other contemplative places where illumination occurs."

Peter Orner in The New York Times said: "[o]ne of the beauties of this lucid and exhilarating book is that Krauss is unafraid, at times, to let it go where it will. Aspects of 'Forest Dark' will be familiar to readers of Krauss’s earlier books 'The History of Love' and 'Great House,' including a preoccupation with the writing process and a revelatory take on the ties that bind people separated by generations. Other qualities, like a consuming emphasis on disconnection — on all that refuses to add up — might come as a surprise".

The New Statesman described it as "an impressive meditation on identity and the human condition". Its reviewer, Douglas Kennedy, said: "Forest Dark, which comes seven years after [Krauss's] last book, Great House, is that rare species: a novel of ideas in which the cerebral never impinges on the human mess that underscores the external and internal landscapes of a riveting narrative... This is as original and impressive a work of fiction as I have encountered in years; a welcome reminder of how a novel can be defiantly and brilliantly novel."

Emily St. John Mandel, reviewing the book for The Guardian, praised it as being "a brilliant achievement", saying "There have been a great many novels about writing novels and it’s a difficult trick to pull off, but it’s testament to Krauss’s formidable skill as a writer that this one feels entirely original."

However, Kirkus Reviews described it as an "ambitiously high-concept tale that mainly idles in a contemplative register". Its reviewer said that "much of the drama [Krauss] establishes for her two characters feels dry, with her riffs on Kafka and Judaism more essayistic than novelistic. And though the novel never promised high drama, its low boil makes it harder to inspire the reader to draw connections within her braided narrative."
