= Anti-poetry =

Literary art movement

Anti-poetry is a literary movement that advocates breaking the usual conventions of traditional poetry. Early proponents of anti-poetry include the Chilean Nicanor Parra and the Greek Elias Petropoulos.

Parra, known as the father of anti-poetry, published his first collection of anti-poems in 1954, rejecting the conventional belief that a verse holds a mystical power. His poems have been described as prose-like, irreverent, and illuminating of human existential concerns.

Petropoulos sought to describe the art of anti-poetry in his Berlin notebook, containing verses that included intentionally-made mistakes of prosody, grammar, and rhyme. An inspiration for many of his poems was the difficult atmosphere of the wall-divided Berlin where he resided. He had come to believe that poetry centered on love and desire, was too gentle for modern literature – that it was time for an anti-poetry incorporating anti-sentimental feelings.

== Early history ==
During 5th century B.C, theatrical sketches called mimes were being introduced with ideas and languages that were determined to be anti-plays. There had been times when poets would turn against their own poetry in an antagonistic way. Anti-poetry can be found and cited from the first poets of Italy (Dante, followed by Petrarch) as well as some other places in Europe. They made the decision to compose verses in vernacular rather than Latin, and were therefore behaving in an anti-poetic manner. Many playwrights, including William Shakespeare and Moliere, were cited for using anti-poetry within a verse play.

== Modern anti-poetry ==
Anti-poetry has been picked up in the 21st century. Modern anti-poetry carries the same spirit as the early writers, but is still distinct in nature. In modern anti-poetry, punctuation is minimal and only used as necessary. Formatting and capitalization are simple and friendly to the eye. It also incorporates new vocabulary and depicts poetic images and scenes.

== See also ==
- Dada
- Hungry generation
