= To Be a Man =

2023 single by Canadian musician/rapper Dax

Single by Dax

from the album What is Life?
- Released: April 14, 2023
- Genre: R&B; country
- Length: 3:39
- Label: Records; Columbia
- Songwriters: Daniel Nwosu Jr.; Lex Nour
- Producer: Lex Nour

Dax singles chronology
"Depression" (2022)	"To Be a Man" (2023)	"God's Eyes" (2022)

Music video
- "To Be a Man" on YouTube

To Be a Man (feat. Darius Rucker)
- Cover for version featuring Darius Rucker

"To Be a Man" is a song by Canadian rapper and singer Dax. He wrote the song alongside frequent collaborator and producer Lex Nour. The original version was included on Dax's 2023 mixtape, What is Life?. He released a "mega remix" of the song in June 2023 featuring ten other artists. In October 2023, Dax released a new version of the song featuring American singer-songwriter Darius Rucker. The new version reached number one on the Billboard Country Digital Song Sales chart in the United States.

== Background ==
Dax described the track as "the most important song he has ever written". Dax also stated that this song helps him and other people understand what it is like to be a man, hence the song title.

== Critical reception ==
Alex Harris of Neon Music described "To Be a Man" as "raw, emotional, and introspective," adding that Dax's "lyrical prowess shines as he grapples with societal expectations and the true essence of manhood". An uncredited review from CBC Music described the song as "Dax's sweet spot: writing a song on the pulse of a feeling, and pushing harder on that pain point".

The version of "To Be a Man" featuring Darius Rucker also received praise from critics. Osafo Daniel of Ghana Plug said that the song "provides a powerful platform for exploring these complexities, ultimately encouraging dialogue about the emotional well-being of men". An uncredited review from All Country News said the track "serves as a light for conversation and change".

== Music video ==
The official music video for "To Be a Man" premiered on YouTube on April 14, 2023, and was shot by Logan Meis. The official video for the version of the song featuring Darius Rucker premiered on October 27, 2023, and was also directed by Logan Meis.

== Track listings ==
Digital download - single

1. "To Be a Man" – 3:39

Digital download - single

1. "To Be a Man" (Mega Remix) [feat. The Mediary, Shane, Skywalker DaVinci, Kaveman Brown, Hailey Dayton, Ben Becker, Brutha Rick, Romeo ThaGreatwhite, Phix, and Atlus] – 10:12

Digital download - single

1. "To Be a Man" (feat. Darius Rucker) – 3:39

== Charts ==
Chart performance for "To Be a Man"
Chart (2023–2024)	Peak position
Canada Country (Billboard)	53
Canada Digital Songs (Billboard)	13
US Bubbling Under Hot 100 (Billboard)	12
US Hot Country Songs (Billboard)	32

== Certifications ==
Certifications for "To Be a Man"
Region	Certification	Certified units/sales
Canada (Music Canada)	Platinum	80,000^{‡}
United States (RIAA)	Gold	500,000^{‡}
^{‡} Sales+streaming figures based on certification alone.
