= San Fabián de Alico =

Town in San Fabián, Ñuble Region, Chile

Coordinates: 36°33′S 71°33′W

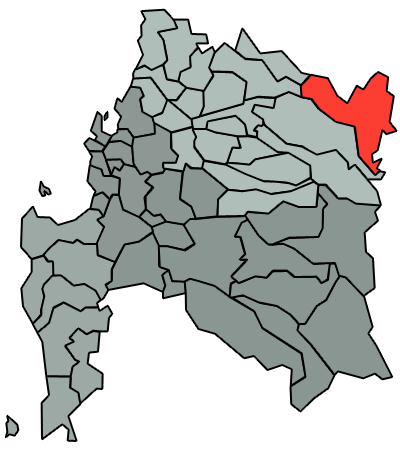
Map of San Fabián municipality in the former Bío-Bío Region of Chile

San Fabián de Alico is a town in San Fabián, Ñuble Region, Chile.

== See also ==
- List of towns in Chile
