= Francesca Segal =

British author and journalist

- Occupation: Writer
- Relatives: Erich Segal (father)
- Writing career
- Language: English
- Notable work: The Innocents (2012)
- Notable awards: Women's Prize for Fiction

Francesca Segal (born 1980) is a British author and journalist. She is best known for her debut novel, The Innocents (2012), which won several book awards.

== Life and career ==
She was raised in a Jewish community in northwest London where she still lives today. She is the daughter of American author, Erich Segal.

Segal studied at St Hugh's College, Oxford before becoming an author and journalist. Her writing has been published in many places including The Guardian, American Vogue, British Vogue, The Observer, and the Financial Times.

Her first novel, The Innocents was published in 2012 and is based in a Jewish community, similar to the one in which she grew up in. It won several awards and was also longlisted for the 2013 Baileys Women's Prize for Fiction.

Segal's second novel, The Awkward Age was published in May 2017. Her third book, Mother Ship, is a memoir released in June 2019. It follows Segal in the aftermath of the premature birth of her twin daughters and their time spent in hospital.

== Awards ==
Awards and Nominations
Year	Work	Award	Category	Result	Ref
2012	The Innocents	Costa Book Award	First Novel	Won	
2012	The Innocents	National Jewish Book Award	—	Won	
2013	The Innocents	Baileys Women's Prize for Fiction	—	Longlisted	
2013	The Innocents	Betty Trask Prize and Awards	Betty Trask Award	Won	
2013	The Innocents	Harold U. Ribalow Prize	—	Won	
2013	The Innocents	Sami Rohr Prize for Jewish Literature	—	Won	

== Biblio ==
=== Novels ===
- The Innocents (2012)
- The Awkward Age (2017)
- Welcome to Glorious Tuga (2024)
- Island Calling (2025)

=== Memoir ===
- Mother Ship (2019)
