= Domingo Contreras Gómez =

Chilean lawyer, politician, and agricultural landowner (1876–1948)

Member of the Chamber of Deputies of Chile
- In office 15 May 1926 – 15 May 1930
- Constituency: 19th Departmental District (Laja, Nacimiento, Mulchén)

Personal details
- Born: 14 October 1876 Los Ángeles, Chile
- Died: 1948 Los Ángeles, Chile
- Party: Radical Party
- Spouse: Hortensia Toro Amor
- Children: 4
- Occupation: Lawyer, politician, agricultural landowner

Domingo Contreras Gómez (14 October 1876 – 1948) was a Chilean lawyer, politician, and estate administrator. He served as a member of the Chamber of Deputies of Chile for the 19th Departmental District (Laja, Nacimiento, and Mulchén) from 1926 to 1930.

== Early life and education ==
Domingo Contreras Gómez was born in Los Ángeles, Chile, the son of José Dolores Contreras and Adelaida Gómez. He studied at the Liceo de Concepción and later pursued law studies in Concepción. He was admitted as a lawyer on 4 November 1900, with a thesis titled "On Mines and Mining Property".

== Career ==
Contreras Gómez had a diverse professional career, combining law, agriculture, and journalism. He managed several estates in the Laja and Los Ángeles regions, including Santa Amalia, Los Robles, Los Cuartos, La Esperanza, Pan de Azúcar, Santa María, El Espino, and Las Vigilias. He also served as director of the Cooperativa Lechera Bío Bío, a local dairy cooperative.

As a writer, he authored three volumes of poetry and a historical study of the city of Santa María de Los Ángeles. He founded the magazine Bohemia in Concepción in 1897 and the newspaper El Siglo in Los Ángeles.

Politically, he was active in the Radical Party and served as president of the Radical Assembly in Los Ángeles. He also held several administrative and municipal positions in the Bío-Bío area. He served as secretary of the Bío-Bío Intendancy and briefly as Governor of Bío-Bío Province from 20 July to 4 November 1932. In 1938, he was elected as a councilor of the Los Ángeles Municipality and also served as a member of the Reconstruction and Aid Corporation, which coordinated relief and rebuilding efforts following natural disasters and other emergencies.

During his term as a deputy in the 35th Legislative Period of the Chilean Congress (1926–1930), he served on the Permanent Commission on Legislation and Justice and the Commission on Finance.

Contreras Gómez was also involved in civic organizations, serving as president of the Club de la Unión of Los Ángeles, a member of the Centro Español, honorary director of the Ateneo Camilo Henríquez, and director of the Association of Canalists of El Laja.

== Personal life ==
He married Hortensia Toro Amor, and the couple had four children. Contreras Gómez passed away in 1948 and was buried in the Los Ángeles General Cemetery. In his honor, a neighborhood in his hometown was named Población Domingo Contreras Gómez, established on land he donated to local rural and low-income families.

== Works ==
- Efímera (1918), poetry.
- Ánfora (1928), poetry.
- La ciudad de Santa María de Los Ángeles (1942), historical study, 2 volumes.
- La carabela (1945), historical romance.
