= Biobío =

Biobío or Bio-Bío (older form: Bío-Bío) may refer to any of the following:

- Biobío River, the second longest river in Chile and the former southern frontier of the Captaincy General of Chile

Administrative divisions

- Biobío Region, eighth region of Chile (first level)
- Biobío Province, subdivision of the Bío-Bío Region (second level)
- Alto Biobío, commune of the Bio Bío Province (third level)

== See also ==
- Radio Bío-Bío, a Chilean radio station with a news-based output
- ST Bio Bio, an Argentinian tug
