= Bío-Bío Canal =

Irrigation canal in Chile

The Bío Bío Canal (Canal del Bío Bío) is one of the largest irrigation canals in Chile. It is located in Bío Bío Province and takes water from Bío Bío river south to the area of Mulchén for use in agriculture.
