= Parliament of Negrete =

Parliament of Negrete may refer to:

- Parliament of Negrete (1726)
- Parliament of Negrete (1793)
