= Los Angeles Airport (disambiguation) =

Los Angeles Airport primarily refers to Los Angeles International Airport in Los Angeles, California, United States.

It may also refer to:

- "L.A. International Airport", a 1971 song by American country music singer Susan Raye
- Greater Los Angeles § Commercial airports, a list of other commercial airports in Greater Los Angeles, California
- María Dolores Airport, a public airport in the city of Los Ángeles, Biobío Province, Chile
