= Communes of Chile =

Smallest administrative subdivision in Chile

A commune (Spanish: comuna, IPA: [koˈmuna]) is the smallest administrative subdivision in Chile. It may contain cities, towns, villages, hamlets as well as rural areas. In highly populated areas, such as Santiago, Valparaíso and Concepción, a conurbation may be broken into several communes. In sparsely populated areas, conversely, a commune may cover a substantial rural area together with several settled areas which could range from hamlets to towns or cities.

The term "commune" is ambiguous in English, but the word is commonly used in translation for "comuna", although with some controversy among translators. A comuna is similar to a "county" in Anglo-American usage and practice, and may be more universally understood as a "municipality".

Each commune or municipality is governed by a directly elected body known as a municipal council (concejo municipal) consisting of a mayor (alcalde) and a group of councillors (concejales), for a period of four years. The communal civil service administration is known as the municipality (municipalidad) and is headquartered at the mayor's office (alcaldía). According to Chilean law, a single municipality may administer one or more communes, though currently, the only such case is the municipality of Cabo de Hornos, which administers the communes of Antártica and Cabo de Hornos.

Chile's 346 communes are grouped into 56 provinces (provincia, pl. provincias), which are themselves grouped into 16 regions (región, pl. regiones).

== List ==
The following table lists all Chilean communes in alphabetical order, along with a complete list of administrative divisions at all levels. Each commune's population as of the 2024 census is given along with the area and population density.

Commune	Province	Region	Natural Region	INE Region	Population (2024)	Area (km²)	Density
Algarrobo	San Antonio	Valparaíso (V)	North Central Chile	Central	16,076	175.6	91.5
Alhué	Melipilla	Metropolitana (RM)	North Central Chile	Central	7,768	845.2	9.2
Alto Biobío	Biobío	Biobío (VIII)	South Central Chile	Central	6,016	2,124.6	2.8
Alto del Carmen	Huasco	Atacama (III)	Near North Chile	North	4,788	5,938.7	0.8
Alto Hospicio	Iquique	Tarapacá (I)	Far North Chile	North	142,086	593.2	239.5
Ancud	Chiloé	Los Lagos (X)	South Chile	South	40,949	1,752.4	23.4
Andacollo	Elqui	Coquimbo (IV)	Near North Chile	North	11,566	310.3	37.3
Angol	Malleco	Araucanía (IX)	South Chile	South	53,022	1,194.4	44.4
Antártica	Antártica Chilena	Magallanes (XII)	Austral Chile	South	60	1,250,000.0	<0.1
Antofagasta	Antofagasta	Antofagasta (II)	Far North Chile	North	401,096	30,718.1	13.1
Antuco	Biobío	Biobío (VIII)	South Central Chile	Central	4,373	1,884.1	2.3
Arauco	Arauco	Biobío (VIII)	South Central Chile	Central	37,163	956.1	38.9
Arica	Arica	Arica and Parinacota (XV)	Far North Chile	North	241,653	4,799.4	50.4
Aysén	Aysén	Aysén (XI)	Austral Chile	South	23,170	29,970.4	0.8
Buin	Maipo	Metropolitana (RM)	North Central Chile	Central	116,969	214.1	546.3
Bulnes	Diguillín	Ñuble (XVI)	South Central Chile	Central	23,863	425.4	56.1
Cabildo	Petorca	Valparaíso (V)	North Central Chile	Central	20,015	1,455.3	13.8
Cabo de Hornos	Antártica Chilena	Magallanes (XII)	Austral Chile	South	1,750	15,853.7	0.1
Cabrero	Biobío	Biobío (VIII)	South Central Chile	Central	31,256	639.8	48.9
Calama	El Loa	Antofagasta (II)	Far North Chile	North	166,334	15,596.9	10.7
Calbuco	Llanquihue	Los Lagos (X)	South Chile	South	36,474	590.8	61.7
Caldera	Copiapó	Atacama (III)	Near North Chile	North	18,805	4,666.6	4.0
Calera de Tango	Maipo	Metropolitana (RM)	North Central Chile	Central	25,491	73.3	347.8
Calle Larga	Los Andes	Valparaíso (V)	North Central Chile	Central	16,597	321.7	51.6
Camarones	Arica	Arica and Parinacota (XV)	Far North Chile	North	861	3,927.0	0.2
Camiña	Tamarugal	Tarapacá (I)	Far North Chile	North	1,335	2,200.2	0.6
Canela	Choapa	Coquimbo (IV)	Near North Chile	North	9,639	2,196.6	4.4
Cañete	Arauco	Biobío (VIII)	South Central Chile	Central	34,640	1,089.2	31.8
Carahue	Cautín	Araucanía (IX)	South Chile	South	24,957	1,340.6	18.6
Cartagena	San Antonio	Valparaíso (V)	North Central Chile	Central	24,599	245.9	100.0
Casablanca	Valparaíso	Valparaíso (V)	North Central Chile	Central	29,876	952.5	31.4
Castro	Chiloé	Los Lagos (X)	South Chile	South	46,997	472.5	99.5
Catemu	San Felipe	Valparaíso (V)	North Central Chile	Central	13,760	361.6	38.1
Cauquenes	Cauquenes	Maule (VII)	South Central Chile	Central	42,798	2,126.3	20.1
Cerrillos	Santiago	Metropolitana (RM)	North Central Chile	Central	85,041	21.0	4,049.6
Cerro Navia	Santiago	Metropolitana (RM)	North Central Chile	Central	127,250	11.1	11,464.0
Chaitén	Palena	Los Lagos (X)	South Chile	South	4,025	8,470.5	0.5
Chañaral	Chañaral	Atacama (III)	Near North Chile	North	12,345	5,772.4	2.1
Chanco	Cauquenes	Maule (VII)	South Central Chile	Central	9,446	529.5	17.8
Chépica	Colchagua	O'Higgins (VI)	North Central Chile	Central	15,668	503.4	31.1
Chiguayante	Concepción	Biobío (VIII)	South Central Chile	Central	85,822	71.5	1,200.3
Chile Chico	General Carrera	Aysén (XI)	Austral Chile	South	4,905	5,922.3	0.8
Chillán	Diguillín	Ñuble (XVI)	South Central Chile	Central	190,382	511.2	372.4
Chillán Viejo	Diguillín	Ñuble (XVI)	South Central Chile	Central	32,688	291.8	112.0
Chimbarongo	Colchagua	O'Higgins (VI)	North Central Chile	Central	37,258	497.9	74.8
Cholchol	Cautín	Araucanía (IX)	South Chile	South	13,167	427.9	30.8
Chonchi	Chiloé	Los Lagos (X)	South Chile	South	16,078	1,362.1	11.8
Cisnes	Aysén	Aysén (XI)	Austral Chile	South	5,137	15,831.4	0.3
Cobquecura	Itata	Ñuble (XVI)	South Central Chile	Central	5,495	570.3	9.6
Cochamó	Llanquihue	Los Lagos (X)	South Chile	South	4,199	3,910.8	1.1
Cochrane	Capitán Prat	Aysén (XI)	Austral Chile	South	3,458	8,930.5	0.4
Codegua	Cachapoal	O'Higgins (VI)	North Central Chile	Central	13,955	286.9	48.6
Coelemu	Itata	Ñuble (XVI)	South Central Chile	Central	15,895	342.3	46.4
Coihueco	Punilla	Ñuble (XVI)	South Central Chile	Central	29,766	1,776.6	16.8
Coinco	Cachapoal	O'Higgins (VI)	North Central Chile	Central	7,916	98.2	80.6
Colbún	Linares	Maule (VII)	South Central Chile	Central	22,637	2,899.9	7.8
Colchane	Tamarugal	Tarapacá (I)	Far North Chile	North	790	4,015.6	0.2
Colina	Chacabuco	Metropolitana (RM)	North Central Chile	Central	173,293	971.2	178.4
Collipulli	Malleco	Araucanía (IX)	South Chile	South	24,303	1,295.9	18.8
Coltauco	Cachapoal	O'Higgins (VI)	North Central Chile	Central	21,373	224.7	95.1
Combarbalá	Limarí	Coquimbo (IV)	Near North Chile	North	12,954	1,895.9	6.8
Concepción	Concepción	Biobío (VIII)	South Central Chile	Central	230,375	221.6	1,039.6
Conchalí	Santiago	Metropolitana (RM)	North Central Chile	Central	121,587	10.7	11,363.3
Concón	Valparaíso	Valparaíso (V)	North Central Chile	Central	48,294	76.0	635.4
Constitución	Talca	Maule (VII)	South Central Chile	Central	47,004	1,343.6	35.0
Contulmo	Arauco	Biobío (VIII)	South Central Chile	Central	5,905	638.8	9.2
Copiapó	Copiapó	Atacama (III)	Near North Chile	North	168,831	16,681.3	10.1
Coquimbo	Elqui	Coquimbo (IV)	Near North Chile	North	263,719	1,429.3	184.5
Coronel	Concepción	Biobío (VIII)	South Central Chile	Central	123,648	279.4	442.5
Corral	Valdivia	Los Ríos (XIV)	South Chile	South	5,501	766.7	7.2
Coyhaique	Coyhaique	Aysén (XI)	Austral Chile	South	57,823	7,320.2	7.9
Cunco	Cautín	Araucanía (IX)	South Chile	South	19,177	1,906.5	10.1
Curacautín	Malleco	Araucanía (IX)	South Chile	South	18,536	1,664.0	11.1
Curacaví	Melipilla	Metropolitana (RM)	North Central Chile	Central	35,165	693.2	50.7
Curaco de Vélez	Chiloé	Los Lagos (X)	South Chile	South	3,662	80.0	45.8
Curanilahue	Arauco	Biobío (VIII)	South Central Chile	Central	31,119	994.3	31.3
Curarrehue	Cautín	Araucanía (IX)	South Chile	South	7,733	1,170.7	6.6
Curepto	Talca	Maule (VII)	South Central Chile	Central	9,519	1,073.8	8.9
Curicó	Curicó	Maule (VII)	South Central Chile	Central	159,968	1,328.4	120.4
Dalcahue	Chiloé	Los Lagos (X)	South Chile	South	14,894	1,239.4	12.0
Diego de Almagro	Chañaral	Atacama (III)	Near North Chile	North	11,397	18,663.8	0.6
Doñihue	Cachapoal	O'Higgins (VI)	North Central Chile	Central	21,925	78.2	280.4
El Bosque	Santiago	Metropolitana (RM)	North Central Chile	Central	155,257	14.1	11,011.1
El Carmen	Diguillín	Ñuble (XVI)	South Central Chile	Central	13,186	664.3	19.8
El Monte	Talagante	Metropolitana (RM)	North Central Chile	Central	37,497	118.1	317.5
El Quisco	San Antonio	Valparaíso (V)	North Central Chile	Central	18,971	50.7	374.2
El Tabo	San Antonio	Valparaíso (V)	North Central Chile	Central	16,260	98.8	164.6
Empedrado	Talca	Maule (VII)	South Central Chile	Central	3,990	564.9	7.1
Ercilla	Malleco	Araucanía (IX)	South Chile	South	7,730	499.7	15.5
Estación Central	Santiago	Metropolitana (RM)	North Central Chile	Central	181,049	14.1	12,840.4
Florida	Concepción	Biobío (VIII)	South Central Chile	Central	12,958	608.6	21.3
Freire	Cautín	Araucanía (IX)	South Chile	South	26,164	935.2	28.0
Freirina	Huasco	Atacama (III)	Near North Chile	North	7,577	3,577.7	2.1
Fresia	Llanquihue	Los Lagos (X)	South Chile	South	12,320	1,278.1	9.6
Frutillar	Llanquihue	Los Lagos (X)	South Chile	South	22,554	831.4	27.1
Futaleufú	Palena	Los Lagos (X)	South Chile	South	3,062	1,280.0	2.4
Futrono	Ranco	Los Ríos (XIV)	South Chile	South	15,635	2,120.6	7.4
Galvarino	Cautín	Araucanía (IX)	South Chile	South	12,710	568.2	22.4
General Lagos	Parinacota	Arica and Parinacota (XV)	Far North Chile	North	508	2,244.4	0.2
Gorbea	Cautín	Araucanía (IX)	South Chile	South	14,148	694.5	20.4
Graneros	Cachapoal	O'Higgins (VI)	North Central Chile	Central	35,938	112.7	318.9
Guaitecas	Aysén	Aysén (XI)	Austral Chile	South	1,598	787.0	2.0
Hijuelas	Quillota	Valparaíso (V)	North Central Chile	Central	19,286	267.2	72.2
Hualaihué	Palena	Los Lagos (X)	South Chile	South	9,480	2,787.7	3.4
Hualañé	Curicó	Maule (VII)	South Central Chile	Central	10,775	629.0	17.1
Hualpén	Concepción	Biobío (VIII)	South Central Chile	Central	87,731	53.5	1,639.8
Hualqui	Concepción	Biobío (VIII)	South Central Chile	Central	25,795	530.5	48.6
Huara	Tamarugal	Tarapacá (I)	Far North Chile	North	2,858	10,474.6	0.3
Huasco	Huasco	Atacama (III)	Near North Chile	North	9,369	1,601.4	5.9
Huechuraba	Santiago	Metropolitana (RM)	North Central Chile	Central	101,808	44.8	2,272.5
Illapel	Choapa	Coquimbo (IV)	Near North Chile	North	32,009	2,629.1	12.2
Independencia	Santiago	Metropolitana (RM)	North Central Chile	Central	116,943	7.4	15,803.1
Iquique	Iquique	Tarapacá (I)	Far North Chile	North	199,587	2,242.1	89.0
Isla de Maipo	Talagante	Metropolitana (RM)	North Central Chile	Central	39,274	188.7	208.1
Isla de Pascua	Isla de Pascua	Valparaíso (V)	North Central Chile	Central	4,800	163.6	29.3
Juan Fernández	Valparaíso	Valparaíso (V)	North Central Chile	Central	904	147.5	6.1
La Calera	Quillota	Valparaíso (V)	North Central Chile	Central	50,631	60.5	836.9
La Cisterna	Santiago	Metropolitana (RM)	North Central Chile	Central	103,157	10.0	10,315.7
La Cruz	Quillota	Valparaíso (V)	North Central Chile	Central	24,939	78.2	318.9
La Estrella	Cardenal Caro	O'Higgins (VI)	North Central Chile	Central	4,609	435.0	10.6
La Florida	Santiago	Metropolitana (RM)	North Central Chile	Central	374,836	70.8	5,294.3
La Granja	Santiago	Metropolitana (RM)	North Central Chile	Central	112,022	10.1	11,091.3
La Higuera	Elqui	Coquimbo (IV)	Near North Chile	North	4,335	4,158.2	1.0
La Ligua	Petorca	Valparaíso (V)	North Central Chile	Central	39,270	1,163.4	33.8
La Pintana	Santiago	Metropolitana (RM)	North Central Chile	Central	175,421	30.6	5,732.7
La Reina	Santiago	Metropolitana (RM)	North Central Chile	Central	89,870	23.4	3,840.6
La Serena	Elqui	Coquimbo (IV)	Near North Chile	North	250,141	1,892.8	132.2
La Unión	Ranco	Los Ríos (XIV)	South Chile	South	38,907	2,136.7	18.2
Lago Ranco	Ranco	Los Ríos (XIV)	South Chile	South	10,527	1,763.3	6.0
Lago Verde	Coyhaique	Aysén (XI)	Austral Chile	South	779	5,622.3	0.1
Laguna Blanca	Magallanes	Magallanes (XII)	Austral Chile	South	269	3,695.6	0.1
Laja	Biobío	Biobío (VIII)	South Central Chile	Central	23,706	339.8	69.8
Lampa	Chacabuco	Metropolitana (RM)	North Central Chile	Central	145,160	451.9	321.2
Lanco	Valdivia	Los Ríos (XIV)	South Chile	South	16,876	532.4	31.7
Las Cabras	Cachapoal	O'Higgins (VI)	North Central Chile	Central	27,554	749.2	36.8
Las Condes	Santiago	Metropolitana (RM)	North Central Chile	Central	296,134	99.4	2,979.2
Lautaro	Cautín	Araucanía (IX)	South Chile	South	41,936	901.1	46.5
Lebu	Arauco	Biobío (VIII)	South Central Chile	Central	25,246	561.4	45.0
Licantén	Curicó	Maule (VII)	South Central Chile	Central	6,892	273.3	25.2
Limache	Marga Marga	Valparaíso (V)	North Central Chile	Central	56,145	293.8	191.1
Linares	Linares	Maule (VII)	South Central Chile	Central	96,744	1,465.7	66.0
Litueche	Cardenal Caro	O'Higgins (VI)	North Central Chile	Central	8,852	618.8	14.3
Llaillay	San Felipe	Valparaíso (V)	North Central Chile	Central	25,484	349.1	73.0
Llanquihue	Llanquihue	Los Lagos (X)	South Chile	South	18,088	420.8	43.0
Lo Barnechea	Santiago	Metropolitana (RM)	North Central Chile	Central	112,620	1,023.7	110.0
Lo Espejo	Santiago	Metropolitana (RM)	North Central Chile	Central	87,295	7.2	12,124.3
Lo Prado	Santiago	Metropolitana (RM)	North Central Chile	Central	91,290	6.7	13,625.4
Lolol	Colchagua	O'Higgins (VI)	North Central Chile	Central	7,791	596.9	13.1
Loncoche	Cautín	Araucanía (IX)	South Chile	South	25,158	976.8	25.8
Longaví	Linares	Maule (VII)	South Central Chile	Central	33,299	1,453.8	22.9
Lonquimay	Malleco	Araucanía (IX)	South Chile	South	10,247	3,914.2	2.6
Los Álamos	Arauco	Biobío (VIII)	South Central Chile	Central	21,950	599.1	36.6
Los Andes	Los Andes	Valparaíso (V)	North Central Chile	Central	63,440	1,248.3	50.8
Los Ángeles	Biobío	Biobío (VIII)	South Central Chile	Central	219,441	1,748.0	125.5
Los Lagos	Valdivia	Los Ríos (XIV)	South Chile	South	21,431	1,791.2	12.0
Los Muermos	Llanquihue	Los Lagos (X)	South Chile	South	17,162	1,245.8	13.8
Los Sauces	Malleco	Araucanía (IX)	South Chile	South	7,348	849.8	8.6
Los Vilos	Choapa	Coquimbo (IV)	Near North Chile	North	22,879	1,860.6	12.3
Lota	Concepción	Biobío (VIII)	South Central Chile	Central	39,980	135.8	294.4
Lumaco	Malleco	Araucanía (IX)	South Chile	South	9,253	1,119.0	8.3
Machalí	Cachapoal	O'Higgins (VI)	North Central Chile	Central	60,875	2,586.0	23.5
Macul	Santiago	Metropolitana (RM)	North Central Chile	Central	123,800	12.9	9,596.9
Máfil	Valdivia	Los Ríos (XIV)	South Chile	South	8,074	582.7	13.9
Maipú	Santiago	Metropolitana (RM)	North Central Chile	Central	503,635	133.0	3,786.7
Malloa	Cachapoal	O'Higgins (VI)	North Central Chile	Central	13,882	112.6	123.3
Marchihue	Cardenal Caro	O'Higgins (VI)	North Central Chile	Central	8,715	659.9	13.2
María Elena	Tocopilla	Antofagasta (II)	Far North Chile	North	4,834	12,197.2	0.4
María Pinto	Melipilla	Metropolitana (RM)	North Central Chile	Central	15,352	395.0	38.9
Mariquina	Valdivia	Los Ríos (XIV)	South Chile	South	22,973	1,320.5	17.4
Maule	Talca	Maule (VII)	South Central Chile	Central	61,081	238.2	256.4
Maullín	Llanquihue	Los Lagos (X)	South Chile	South	15,063	860.8	17.5
Mejillones	Antofagasta	Antofagasta (II)	Far North Chile	North	14,084	3,803.9	3.7
Melipeuco	Cautín	Araucanía (IX)	South Chile	South	6,796	1,107.3	6.1
Melipilla	Melipilla	Metropolitana (RM)	North Central Chile	Central	136,325	1,344.8	101.4
Molina	Curicó	Maule (VII)	South Central Chile	Central	48,949	1,551.6	31.5
Monte Patria	Limarí	Coquimbo (IV)	Near North Chile	North	29,997	4,366.3	6.9
Mostazal	Cachapoal	O'Higgins (VI)	North Central Chile	Central	27,394	523.9	52.3
Mulchén	Biobío	Biobío (VIII)	South Central Chile	Central	29,036	1,925.3	15.1
Nacimiento	Biobío	Biobío (VIII)	South Central Chile	Central	26,140	934.9	28.0
Nancagua	Colchagua	O'Higgins (VI)	North Central Chile	Central	18,723	111.3	168.2
Natales	Última Esperanza	Magallanes (XII)	Austral Chile	South	24,152	48,974.2	0.5
Navidad	Cardenal Caro	O'Higgins (VI)	North Central Chile	Central	8,885	300.4	29.6
Negrete	Biobío	Biobío (VIII)	South Central Chile	Central	10,723	156.5	68.5
Ninhue	Itata	Ñuble (XVI)	South Central Chile	Central	5,763	401.2	14.4
Ñiquén	Punilla	Ñuble (XVI)	South Central Chile	Central	12,797	493.1	26.0
Nogales	Quillota	Valparaíso (V)	North Central Chile	Central	22,136	405.2	54.6
Nueva Imperial	Cautín	Araucanía (IX)	South Chile	South	33,988	732.5	46.4
Ñuñoa	Santiago	Metropolitana (RM)	North Central Chile	Central	241,467	16.9	14,288.0
O'Higgins	Capitán Prat	Aysén (XI)	Austral Chile	South	647	8,182.5	0.1
Olivar	Cachapoal	O'Higgins (VI)	North Central Chile	Central	13,901	44.6	311.7
Ollagüe	El Loa	Antofagasta (II)	Far North Chile	North	256	2,963.9	0.1
Olmué	Marga Marga	Valparaíso (V)	North Central Chile	Central	19,778	231.8	85.3
Osorno	Osorno	Los Lagos (X)	South Chile	South	166,455	951.3	175.0
Ovalle	Limarí	Coquimbo (IV)	Near North Chile	North	118,696	3,834.5	31.0
Padre Hurtado	Talagante	Metropolitana (RM)	North Central Chile	Central	81,243	80.8	1,005.5
Padre Las Casas	Cautín	Araucanía (IX)	South Chile	South	80,656	400.7	201.3
Paiguano	Elqui	Coquimbo (IV)	Near North Chile	North	4,649	1,494.7	3.1
Paillaco	Valdivia	Los Ríos (XIV)	South Chile	South	19,802	896.0	22.1
Paine	Maipo	Metropolitana (RM)	North Central Chile	Central	78,828	678.0	116.3
Palena	Palena	Los Lagos (X)	South Chile	South	1,903	2,763.7	0.7
Palmilla	Colchagua	O'Higgins (VI)	North Central Chile	Central	13,060	237.3	55.0
Panguipulli	Valdivia	Los Ríos (XIV)	South Chile	South	35,098	3,292.1	10.7
Panquehue	San Felipe	Valparaíso (V)	North Central Chile	Central	7,269	121.9	59.6
Papudo	Petorca	Valparaíso (V)	North Central Chile	Central	7,561	165.6	45.7
Paredones	Cardenal Caro	O'Higgins (VI)	North Central Chile	Central	7,228	561.6	12.9
Parral	Linares	Maule (VII)	South Central Chile	Central	45,323	1,638.4	27.7
Pedro Aguirre Cerda	Santiago	Metropolitana (RM)	North Central Chile	Central	96,062	9.7	9,903.3
Pelarco	Talca	Maule (VII)	South Central Chile	Central	9,229	331.5	27.8
Pelluhue	Cauquenes	Maule (VII)	South Central Chile	Central	8,578	371.4	23.1
Pemuco	Diguillín	Ñuble (XVI)	South Central Chile	Central	8,930	562.7	15.9
Peñaflor	Talagante	Metropolitana (RM)	North Central Chile	Central	94,402	69.2	1,364.2
Peñalolén	Santiago	Metropolitana (RM)	North Central Chile	Central	236,478	54.2	4,363.1
Pencahue	Talca	Maule (VII)	South Central Chile	Central	9,181	956.8	9.6
Penco	Concepción	Biobío (VIII)	South Central Chile	Central	48,971	107.6	455.1
Peralillo	Colchagua	O'Higgins (VI)	North Central Chile	Central	12,493	282.6	44.2
Perquenco	Cautín	Araucanía (IX)	South Chile	South	7,438	330.7	22.5
Petorca	Petorca	Valparaíso (V)	North Central Chile	Central	10,206	1,516.6	6.7
Peumo	Cachapoal	O'Higgins (VI)	North Central Chile	Central	14,243	153.1	93.0
Pica	Tamarugal	Tarapacá (I)	Far North Chile	North	6,272	8,934.3	0.7
Pichidegua	Cachapoal	O'Higgins (VI)	North Central Chile	Central	20,363	320.0	63.6
Pichilemu	Cardenal Caro	O'Higgins (VI)	North Central Chile	Central	19,847	749.1	26.5
Pinto	Diguillín	Ñuble (XVI)	South Central Chile	Central	12,502	1,164.0	10.7
Pirque	Cordillera	Metropolitana (RM)	North Central Chile	Central	29,060	445.3	65.3
Pitrufquén	Cautín	Araucanía (IX)	South Chile	South	27,041	580.7	46.6
Placilla	Colchagua	O'Higgins (VI)	North Central Chile	Central	9,438	146.9	64.2
Portezuelo	Itata	Ñuble (XVI)	South Central Chile	Central	5,203	282.3	18.4
Porvenir	Tierra del Fuego	Magallanes (XII)	Austral Chile	South	6,809	6,982.6	1.0
Pozo Almonte	Tamarugal	Tarapacá (I)	Far North Chile	North	16,878	13,765.8	1.2
Primavera	Tierra del Fuego	Magallanes (XII)	Austral Chile	South	431	4,614.2	0.1
Providencia	Santiago	Metropolitana (RM)	North Central Chile	Central	143,974	14.4	9,998.2
Puchuncaví	Valparaíso	Valparaíso (V)	North Central Chile	Central	22,539	299.9	75.2
Pucón	Cautín	Araucanía (IX)	South Chile	South	32,321	1,248.5	25.9
Pudahuel	Santiago	Metropolitana (RM)	North Central Chile	Central	227,820	197.4	1,154.1
Puente Alto	Cordillera	Metropolitana (RM)	North Central Chile	Central	568,086	88.2	6,440.9
Puerto Montt	Llanquihue	Los Lagos (X)	South Chile	South	277,040	1,673.0	165.6
Puerto Octay	Osorno	Los Lagos (X)	South Chile	South	8,865	1,795.7	4.9
Puerto Varas	Llanquihue	Los Lagos (X)	South Chile	South	52,942	4,064.9	13.0
Pumanque	Colchagua	O'Higgins (VI)	North Central Chile	Central	4,559	440.9	10.3
Punitaqui	Limarí	Coquimbo (IV)	Near North Chile	North	12,076	1,339.3	9.0
Punta Arenas	Magallanes	Magallanes (XII)	Austral Chile	South	132,363	17,846.3	7.4
Puqueldón	Chiloé	Los Lagos (X)	South Chile	South	4,048	97.3	41.6
Purén	Malleco	Araucanía (IX)	South Chile	South	12,184	464.9	26.2
Purranque	Osorno	Los Lagos (X)	South Chile	South	19,542	1,458.8	13.4
Putaendo	San Felipe	Valparaíso (V)	North Central Chile	Central	17,336	1,474.4	11.8
Putre	Parinacota	Arica and Parinacota (XV)	Far North Chile	North	1,547	5,902.5	0.3
Puyehue	Osorno	Los Lagos (X)	South Chile	South	11,712	1,597.9	7.3
Queilén	Chiloé	Los Lagos (X)	South Chile	South	5,690	332.9	17.1
Quellón	Chiloé	Los Lagos (X)	South Chile	South	28,460	3,244.0	8.8
Quemchi	Chiloé	Los Lagos (X)	South Chile	South	8,409	440.3	19.1
Quilaco	Biobío	Biobío (VIII)	South Central Chile	Central	4,440	1,123.7	4.0
Quilicura	Santiago	Metropolitana (RM)	North Central Chile	Central	205,624	57.5	3,576.1
Quilleco	Biobío	Biobío (VIII)	South Central Chile	Central	9,700	1,121.8	8.6
Quillón	Diguillín	Ñuble (XVI)	South Central Chile	Central	19,165	423.0	45.3
Quillota	Quillota	Valparaíso (V)	North Central Chile	Central	96,753	302.0	320.4
Quilpué	Marga Marga	Valparaíso (V)	North Central Chile	Central	162,559	536.9	302.8
Quinchao	Chiloé	Los Lagos (X)	South Chile	South	7,678	160.7	47.8
Quinta de Tilcoco	Cachapoal	O'Higgins (VI)	North Central Chile	Central	13,558	93.2	145.5
Quinta Normal	Santiago	Metropolitana (RM)	North Central Chile	Central	129,351	12.4	10,431.5
Quintero	Valparaíso	Valparaíso (V)	North Central Chile	Central	35,754	147.5	242.4
Quirihue	Itata	Ñuble (XVI)	South Central Chile	Central	11,746	589.0	19.9
Rancagua	Cachapoal	O'Higgins (VI)	North Central Chile	Central	257,744	260.3	990.2
Ránquil	Itata	Ñuble (XVI)	South Central Chile	Central	6,508	248.3	26.2
Rauco	Curicó	Maule (VII)	South Central Chile	Central	11,266	308.6	36.5
Recoleta	Santiago	Metropolitana (RM)	North Central Chile	Central	154,615	16.2	9,544.1
Renaico	Malleco	Araucanía (IX)	South Chile	South	10,686	267.4	40.0
Renca	Santiago	Metropolitana (RM)	North Central Chile	Central	143,622	24.2	5,934.8
Rengo	Cachapoal	O'Higgins (VI)	North Central Chile	Central	63,620	591.5	107.6
Requínoa	Cachapoal	O'Higgins (VI)	North Central Chile	Central	29,508	673.3	43.8
Retiro	Linares	Maule (VII)	South Central Chile	Central	22,310	827.1	27.0
Rinconada	Los Andes	Valparaíso (V)	North Central Chile	Central	11,855	122.5	96.8
Río Bueno	Ranco	Los Ríos (XIV)	South Chile	South	33,363	2,211.7	15.1
Río Claro	Talca	Maule (VII)	South Central Chile	Central	14,276	430.5	33.2
Río Hurtado	Limarí	Coquimbo (IV)	Near North Chile	North	4,334	2,117.2	2.0
Río Ibáñez	General Carrera	Aysén (XI)	Austral Chile	South	2,723	5,997.2	0.5
Río Negro	Osorno	Los Lagos (X)	South Chile	South	13,874	1,265.7	11.0
Río Verde	Magallanes	Magallanes (XII)	Austral Chile	South	102	9,975.2	<0.1
Romeral	Curicó	Maule (VII)	South Central Chile	Central	17,233	1,597.1	10.8
Saavedra	Cautín	Araucanía (IX)	South Chile	South	12,877	400.8	32.1
Sagrada Familia	Curicó	Maule (VII)	South Central Chile	Central	19,427	548.8	35.4
Salamanca	Choapa	Coquimbo (IV)	Near North Chile	North	27,823	3,445.3	8.1
San Antonio	San Antonio	Valparaíso (V)	North Central Chile	Central	96,770	404.5	239.2
San Bernardo	Maipo	Metropolitana (RM)	North Central Chile	Central	306,371	155.1	1,975.3
San Carlos	Punilla	Ñuble (XVI)	South Central Chile	Central	55,847	874.0	63.9
San Clemente	Talca	Maule (VII)	South Central Chile	Central	47,380	4,503.5	10.5
San Esteban	Los Andes	Valparaíso (V)	North Central Chile	Central	20,112	1,361.6	14.8
San Fabián	Punilla	Ñuble (XVI)	South Central Chile	Central	5,245	1,568.3	3.3
San Felipe	San Felipe	Valparaíso (V)	North Central Chile	Central	80,413	185.9	432.6
San Fernando	Colchagua	O'Higgins (VI)	North Central Chile	Central	75,585	2,441.3	31.0
San Gregorio	Magallanes	Magallanes (XII)	Austral Chile	South	241	6,883.7	<0.1
San Ignacio	Diguillín	Ñuble (XVI)	South Central Chile	Central	17,405	363.6	47.9
San Javier	Linares	Maule (VII)	South Central Chile	Central	49,559	1,313.4	37.7
San Joaquín	Santiago	Metropolitana (RM)	North Central Chile	Central	95,602	9.7	9,855.9
San José de Maipo	Cordillera	Metropolitana (RM)	North Central Chile	Central	17,441	4,994.8	3.5
San Juan de la Costa	Osorno	Los Lagos (X)	South Chile	South	7,776	1,517.0	5.1
San Miguel	Santiago	Metropolitana (RM)	North Central Chile	Central	150,829	9.5	15,876.7
San Nicolás	Punilla	Ñuble (XVI)	South Central Chile	Central	15,099	490.5	30.8
San Pablo	Osorno	Los Lagos (X)	South Chile	South	10,883	637.3	17.1
San Pedro	Melipilla	Metropolitana (RM)	North Central Chile	Central	11,108	787.5	14.1
San Pedro de Atacama	El Loa	Antofagasta (II)	Far North Chile	North	9,843	23,438.8	0.4
San Pedro de la Paz	Concepción	Biobío (VIII)	South Central Chile	Central	150,992	112.5	1,342.2
San Rafael	Talca	Maule (VII)	South Central Chile	Central	11,230	263.5	42.6
San Ramón	Santiago	Metropolitana (RM)	North Central Chile	Central	76,002	6.5	11,692.6
San Rosendo	Biobío	Biobío (VIII)	South Central Chile	Central	3,575	92.4	38.7
San Vicente	Cachapoal	O'Higgins (VI)	North Central Chile	Central	49,559	475.8	104.2
Santa Bárbara	Biobío	Biobío (VIII)	South Central Chile	Central	14,075	1,254.9	11.2
Santa Cruz	Colchagua	O'Higgins (VI)	North Central Chile	Central	41,209	419.5	98.2
Santa Juana	Concepción	Biobío (VIII)	South Central Chile	Central	14,947	731.2	20.4
Santa María	San Felipe	Valparaíso (V)	North Central Chile	Central	15,134	166.3	91.0
Santiago	Santiago	Metropolitana (RM)	North Central Chile	Central	438,856	22.4	19,591.8
Santo Domingo	San Antonio	Valparaíso (V)	North Central Chile	Central	13,171	536.1	24.6
Sierra Gorda	Antofagasta	Antofagasta (II)	Far North Chile	North	1,472	12,886.4	0.1
Talagante	Talagante	Metropolitana (RM)	North Central Chile	Central	76,429	125.5	609.0
Talca	Talca	Maule (VII)	South Central Chile	Central	232,131	231.5	1,002.7
Talcahuano	Concepción	Biobío (VIII)	South Central Chile	Central	147,322	92.3	1,596.1
Taltal	Antofagasta	Antofagasta (II)	Far North Chile	North	12,097	20,405.1	0.6
Temuco	Cautín	Araucanía (IX)	South Chile	South	292,518	464.0	630.4
Teno	Curicó	Maule (VII)	South Central Chile	Central	30,113	618.4	48.7
Teodoro Schmidt	Cautín	Araucanía (IX)	South Chile	South	15,639	649.9	24.1
Tierra Amarilla	Copiapó	Atacama (III)	Near North Chile	North	11,846	11,190.6	1.1
Tiltil	Chacabuco	Metropolitana (RM)	North Central Chile	Central	19,742	653.0	30.2
Timaukel	Tierra del Fuego	Magallanes (XII)	Austral Chile	South	157	10,995.9	<0.1
Tirúa	Arauco	Biobío (VIII)	South Central Chile	Central	10,208	624.4	16.3
Tocopilla	Tocopilla	Antofagasta (II)	Far North Chile	North	25,400	4,038.8	6.3
Toltén	Cautín	Araucanía (IX)	South Chile	South	10,041	860.4	11.7
Tomé	Concepción	Biobío (VIII)	South Central Chile	Central	56,907	494.5	115.1
Torres del Paine	Última Esperanza	Magallanes (XII)	Austral Chile	South	203	6,469.7	<0.1
Tortel	Capitán Prat	Aysén (XI)	Austral Chile	South	505	19,930.6	<0.1
Traiguén	Malleco	Araucanía (IX)	South Chile	South	18,873	908.0	20.8
Treguaco	Itata	Ñuble (XVI)	South Central Chile	Central	6,124	313.1	19.6
Tucapel	Biobío	Biobío (VIII)	South Central Chile	Central	15,729	914.9	17.2
Valdivia	Valdivia	Los Ríos (XIV)	South Chile	South	170,043	1,015.6	167.4
Vallenar	Huasco	Atacama (III)	Near North Chile	North	54,222	7,083.7	7.7
Valparaíso	Valparaíso	Valparaíso (V)	North Central Chile	Central	284,938	401.6	709.5
Vichuquén	Curicó	Maule (VII)	South Central Chile	Central	4,716	425.7	11.1
Victoria	Malleco	Araucanía (IX)	South Chile	South	34,464	1,256.0	27.4
Vicuña	Elqui	Coquimbo (IV)	Near North Chile	North	28,047	7,609.8	3.7
Vilcún	Cautín	Araucanía (IX)	South Chile	South	31,575	1,420.9	22.2
Villa Alegre	Linares	Maule (VII)	South Central Chile	Central	17,919	189.8	94.4
Villa Alemana	Marga Marga	Valparaíso (V)	North Central Chile	Central	139,571	96.5	1,446.3
Villarrica	Cautín	Araucanía (IX)	South Chile	South	67,737	1,291.1	52.5
Viña del Mar	Valparaíso	Valparaíso (V)	North Central Chile	Central	334,871	121.6	2,753.9
Vitacura	Santiago	Metropolitana (RM)	North Central Chile	Central	86,420	28.3	3,053.7
Yerbas Buenas	Linares	Maule (VII)	South Central Chile	Central	20,035	262.1	76.4
Yumbel	Biobío	Biobío (VIII)	South Central Chile	Central	23,170	727.0	31.9
Yungay	Diguillín	Ñuble (XVI)	South Central Chile	Central	18,680	823.5	22.7
Zapallar	Petorca	Valparaíso (V)	North Central Chile	Central	7,980	288.0	27.7

== See also ==
- Administrative divisions of Chile
- Regions of Chile
- Provinces of Chile
- List of towns in Chile
- List of cities in Chile
