= Antuco, Chile =

Antuco
- Town and Commune
- Coat of arms Commune of Antuco in the Bío Bío Region Location in Chile
- Coordinates (city): 37°19′49″S 71°40′24″W
- Country: Chile
- Region: Bío Bío
- Province: Bío Bío

Government
  - Type: Municipality
  - Alcalde: Claudio Edelberto Solar Jara (PDC)

Area
  - Total: 1,884.1 km^{2} (727.5 sq mi)
- Elevation: 553 m (1,814 ft)

Population (2012 Census)
  - Total: 3,862
  - Density: 2.050/km^{2} (5.309/sq mi)
  - Urban: 1,978
  - Rural: 1,930

Sex
  - Men: 1,981
  - Women: 1,927
- Time zone: UTC-4 (CLT)
  - Summer (DST): UTC-3 (CLST)
- Area code: (+56) 43
- Website: www.municipalidadantuco.cl

Antuco is a Chilean commune and town in Bío Bío Province, Bío Bío Region.

The commune includes Laguna del Laja and Laguna del Laja National Park, which contains Antuco Volcano and Sierra Velluda. The latter is the tallest mountain in Bío Bío Region. The town of Antuco is located slightly south of the south bank of the Laja River.

== Demographics ==
According to the 2002 census of the National Statistics Institute, Antuco spans an area of 1,884.1 km^{2} (727 sq mi) and has 3,908 inhabitants (1,981 men and 1,927 women). Of these, 1,978 (50.6%) lived in urban areas and 1,930 (49.4%) in rural areas. The population fell by 3.8% (154 persons) between the 1992 and 2002 censuses.

== Administration ==
As a commune, Antuco is a third-level administrative division of Chile administered by a municipal council, headed by an alcalde who is directly elected every four years. The 2008-2012 alcalde is Claudio Edelberto Solar Jara (PDC).

Within the electoral divisions of Chile, Antuco is represented in the Chamber of Deputies by Juan Lobos (UDI) and José Pérez (PRSD) as part of the 47th electoral district, together with Los Ángeles, Tucapel, Quilleco, Santa Bárbara, Quilaco, Mulchén, Negrete, Nacimiento, San Rosendo, Laja and Alto Bío Bío. The commune is represented in the Senate by Victor Pérez Varela (UDI) and Mariano Ruiz-Esquide Jara (PDC) as part of the 13th senatorial constituency (Biobío-Coast).
