= Quilaco =

- Town and Commune
- Coat of arms Location in Chile
- Coordinates: 37°40′S 71°59′W
- Country: Chile
- Region: Bío Bío
- Province: Bío Bío
- Mission built: 13 December 1760

Government
  - Type: Municipality
  - Alcalde: Fredy Barrueto Viveros (PRI)

Area
  - Total: 1,123.7 km^{2} (433.9 sq mi)
- Elevation: 400 m (1,300 ft)

Population (2012 Census)
  - Total: 3,850
  - Density: 3.43/km^{2} (8.87/sq mi)
  - Urban: 1,612
  - Rural: 2,409

Sex
  - Men: 2,110
  - Women: 1,911
- Time zone: UTC-4 (CLT)
  - Summer (DST): UTC-3 (CLST)
- Area code: 56 + 43
- Website: Municipality of Quilaco

Quilaco is a Chilean town and commune located in the Bío Bío Province, Bío Bío Region. The commune spans an area of 1,123.7 km^{2} (434 sq mi).

== History ==
Quilaco has two accepted meanings: "Three waters" or "Quila in the water". The town has its roots in the Mapuche and Spanish races, as produced with the arrival of Franciscan missionaries in the 18th century. The town was founded 13 December 1760 when friar Juan Matud created the mission named "Purest Conception of Quilaco" (“Purísima Concepción de Quilaco"). Around the mission, the town was formed, whose settlement and the surrounding localities were completed much later. Agricultural workers were sought out for infrastructure developments such as the South Bío Bío Canal, Agricultural Settlement Fund projects, and Agricultural Reform projects, and for the progressive parceling of some old estates. This diverse doubling is reflected today in the local roots, more than a local identity, it manifests itself in its extant communal traditions, notwithstanding those areas that observe certain customs of south-central and southern Chile.

== Demographics ==
According to the 2002 census of the National Statistics Institute, Quilaco spans an area of 1,123.7 km^{2} (434 sq mi) and has 4,021 inhabitants (2,110 men and 1,911 women). Of these, 1,612 (40.1%) lived in urban areas and 2,409 (59.9%) in rural areas. Between the 1992 and 2002 censuses, the population fell by 8.2% (358 persons).

== Administration ==
As a commune, Quilaco is a third-level administrative division of Chile administered by a municipal council, headed by an alcalde who is directly elected every four years. The 2008-2012 alcalde is Fredy Barrueto Viveros (PRI).

Within the electoral divisions of Chile, Quilaco is represented in the Chamber of Deputies by Juan Lobos (UDI) and José Pérez (PRSD) as part of the 47th electoral district, together with Los Ángeles, Tucapel, Antuco, Quilleco, Santa Bárbara, Mulchén, Negrete, Nacimiento, San Rosendo, Laja and Alto Bío Bío. The commune is represented in the Senate by Victor Pérez Varela (UDI) and Mariano Ruiz-Esquide Jara (PDC) as part of the 13th senatorial constituency (Biobío-Coast).
