= Tucapel =

- Town and Commune
- Coat of arms Location of Tucapel commune in the Bío Bío Region Location in Chile
- Coordinates (town): 37°17′S 71°57′W
- Country: Chile
- Region: Bío Bío
- Province: Bío Bío

Government
  - Type: Municipality
  - Alcalde: Jaime Sergio Veloso Jara (RN)

Area
  - Total: 914.9 km^{2} (353.2 sq mi)
- Elevation: 331 m (1,086 ft)

Population (2012 Census)
  - Total: 13,427
  - Density: 14.68/km^{2} (38.01/sq mi)
  - Urban: 8,827
  - Rural: 3,950
- Demonym: Tucapelino

Sex
  - Men: 6,403
  - Women: 6,374
- Time zone: UTC-4 (CLT)
  - Summer (DST): UTC-3 (CLST)
- Area code: 56 + 43
- Website: Municipality of Tucapel

Tucapel is a town and commune in the Bío Bío Province, Bío Bío Region, Chile. It was once a region of Araucanía named for the Tucapel River. The name of the region derived from the rehue and aillarehue of the Moluche people of the area between the Lebu and the Lleulleu Rivers, who were famed for their long resistance to the Spanish in the Arauco War. Tucapel is also the name of a famous leader from that region in the first resistance against the Spanish mentioned in Alonso de Ercilla's epic poem La Araucana. Formerly belonging to the Ñuble Province, in the Yungay Department. Near the town of Tucapel is the Plaza de San Diego de Tucapel. The capital of the commune is the town of Huépil, moving the municipality from Tucapel in 1967. In Mapudungun the name Huépil means "To seize or to take by force".

The main economic activities of the commune are commerce, agriculture and forestry.

== History ==
Tucapel is an old foundation in the country, originally part of the Rere Province, in which three La Frontera fortresses existed: Talcamávida, Yumbel and San Diego de Tucapel.

The fortress of San Diego de Alcalá de Tucapel was founded by Pedro de Valdivia in 1552 on a hill in the valley of the Tucapel River at the present location of the city of Cañete. Near here, the conqueror died after being surprised and defeated at the Battle of Tucapel by Lautaro, after he had arrived to relieve the fortress, which Lautaro had already destroyed before December 25, 1553.

In 1557, the fortress and the later city of Cañete de la Frontera were later rebuilt by García Hurtado de Mendoza three kilometers to the west of the present location of the city and resisted an attack by Toqui Caupolicán. It was abandoned again in January 1563 during the second Mapuche uprising. Later it was rebuilt by Rodrigo de Quiroga in 1566. It was finally abandoned after the Battle of Curalaba in the Mapuche Uprising of 1598. The present city of Cañete was founded on November 12, 1868, by colonel Cornelio Saavedra Rodríguez as part of the pacification of Araucanía.

In 1603 a new fort Tucapel was established on the site of the Valdivia's old fort by Alonso de Ribera as part of his system of frontier forts. It received improvements in 1668 under the governor Diego Dávila Coello, who populated it, making it a mission site and named it Plaza de San Diego de Tucapel. This place was the target of repeated attacks by the Mapuche and was captured by Vilumilla in Mapuche Uprising of 1723. It was abandoned and demolished by Gabriel Cano de Aponte in 1724 and he transferred its garrison and inhabitants to the bank of the Laja River near the Andes where a new Plaza de San Diego de Tucapel was built and later a town of Tucapel has established.

== Demographics ==
According to the 2002 census of the National Statistics Institute, Tucapel spans an area of 914.9 km^{2} (353 sq mi) and has 12,777 inhabitants (6,403 men and 6,374 women). Of these, 8,827 (69.1%) lived in urban areas and 3,950 (30.9%) in rural areas. The population grew by 6.3% (757 persons) between the 1992 and 2002 censuses.

== Administration ==
As a commune, Tucapel is a third-level administrative division of Chile administered by a municipal council, headed by an alcalde who is directly elected every four years. The 2008-2012 alcalde is Jaime Sergio Veloso Jara (RN).

Within the electoral divisions of Chile, Tucapel is represented in the Chamber of Deputies by Juan Lobos (UDI) and José Pérez (PRSD) as part of the 47th electoral district, together with Los Ángeles, Antuco, Quilleco, Santa Bárbara, Quilaco, Mulchén, Negrete, Nacimiento, San Rosendo, Laja and Alto Bío Bío. The commune is represented in the Senate by Victor Pérez Varela (UDI) and Mariano Ruiz-Esquide Jara (PDC) as part of the 13th senatorial constituency (Biobío-Coast).
