= Santa Bárbara, Chile =

Santa Bárbara
- City and Commune
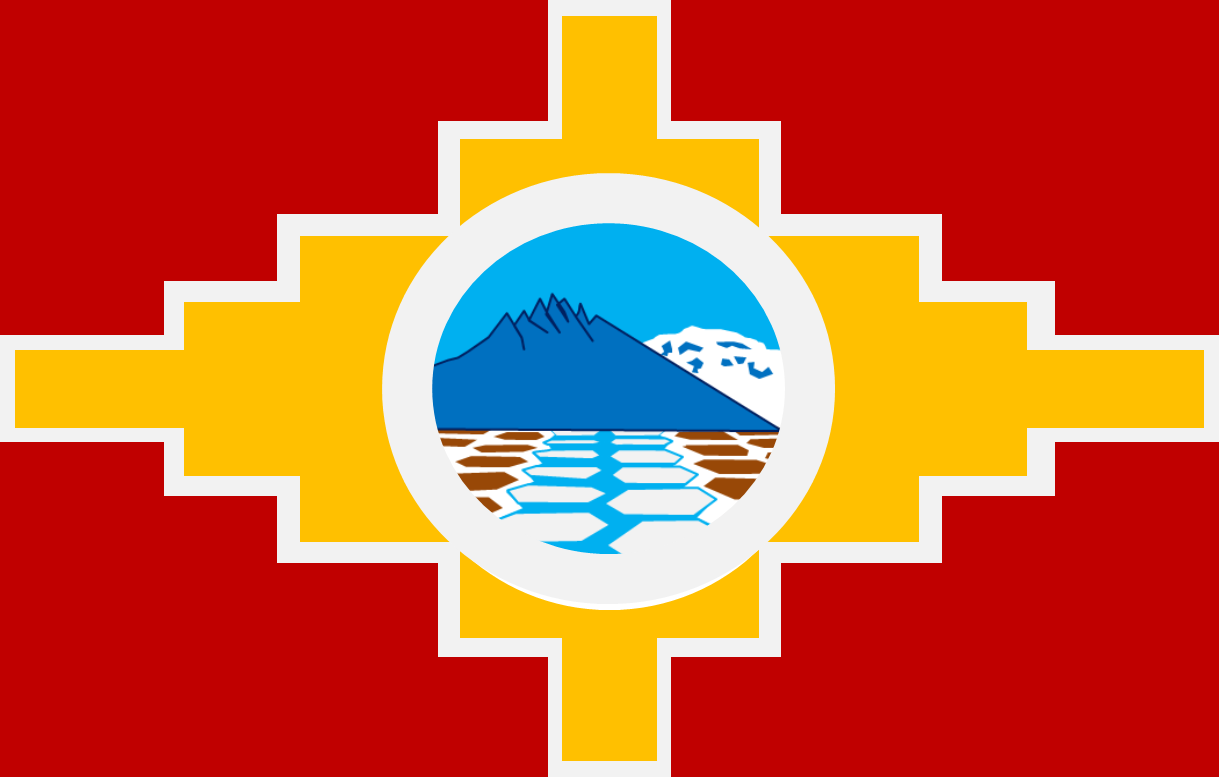
- Flag Coat of arms Commune of Santa Bárbara in the Bío Bío Region Location in Chile
- Coordinates (city): 37°40′14″S 72°01′17″W
- Country: Chile
- Region: Bío Bío
- Province: Bío Bío
- Named for: Saint Barbara

Government
  - Type: Municipality
  - Alcalde: Daniel Enrique Iraira Sagredo (ILE)

Area
  - Total: 1,254.9 km^{2} (484.5 sq mi)
- Elevation: 222 m (728 ft)

Population (2012 Census)
  - Total: 13,405
  - Density: 10.682/km^{2} (27.667/sq mi)
  - Urban: 7,932
  - Rural: 12,038

Sex
  - Men: 10,835
  - Women: 9,135
- Time zone: UTC−4 (CLT)
  - Summer (DST): UTC−3 (CLST)
- Area code: 56 + 43
- Website: www.santabarbara.cl

Santa Bárbara is a Chilean city and commune in Bío Bío Province, Bío Bío Region. In 2004 a great portion of its territory was taken off to form the new commune of Alto Bío Bío.

== History ==
The city of Santa Bárbara lies on the north bank of the Biobío River, and was established by Manuel de Amat y Juniet first as the fort of Santa Bárbara in 1756. The governor populated and erected the town of Santa Bárbara there on July 4, 1758. The town and fort was improved during the government of Ambrosio O' Higgins and became an important post for containing the malones of the Pehuenches. In January 1819 it was depopulated and in 1821 it was burned by the royalist Juan Manuel Picó. It remained in ruins until 1833 when it began to be repopulated under the direction of the commander Domingo Salvo. It eventually developed to the point it was again recognized as a town January 2, 1871.

== Demographics ==
According to the 2002 census of the National Statistics Institute, Santa Bárbara spans an area of 3,379.5 km^{2} (1,305 sq mi) and has 19,970 inhabitants (10,835 men and 9,135 women). Of these, 7,932 (39.7%) lived in urban areas and 12,038 (60.3%) in rural areas. The population grew by 67.8% (8,069 persons) between the 1992 and 2002 censuses.

== Administration ==
As a commune, Santa Bárbara is a third-level administrative division of Chile administered by a municipal council, headed by an alcalde who is directly elected every four years. The 2008-2012 alcalde is Daniel Enrique Iraira Sagredo (ILE).

Within the electoral divisions of Chile, Santa Bárbara is represented in the Chamber of Deputies by Juan Lobos (UDI) and José Pérez (PRSD) as part of the 47th electoral district, together with Los Ángeles, Tucapel, Antuco, Quilleco, Quilaco, Mulchén, Negrete, Nacimiento, San Rosendo, Laja and Alto Bío Bío. The commune is represented in the Senate by Victor Pérez Varela (UDI) and Mariano Ruiz-Esquide Jara (PDC) as part of the 13th senatorial constituency (Biobío-Coast).
