= Negrete =

- Town and Commune
- Coat of arms Commune of Negrete in the Bío Bío Region Location in Chile
- Coordinates (city): 37°35′0″S 72°32′0″W
- Country: Chile
- Region: Bío Bío Region
- Province: Bío Bío Province

Government
  - Type: Municipality
  - Alcalde: Javier Melo Márquez (Ind.)

Area
  - Total: 156.5 km^{2} (60.4 sq mi)
- Elevation: 71 m (233 ft)

Population (2012 Census)
  - Total: 9,394
  - Density: 60.03/km^{2} (155.5/sq mi)
  - Urban: 5,283
  - Rural: 3,296

Sex
  - Men: 4,414
  - Women: 4,165
- Area code: (+56) 43
- Website: Municipality of Negrete

Negrete (Spanish pronunciation: [neˈɣɾete]) is a Chilean town and commune in Bío Bío Province, Bío Bío Region. It is bordered by the commune of Los Ángeles to the north, Renaico to the south, Mulchén to the east and Nacimiento to the west.

The town of Negrete is located on the south shore of the Bío Bío river, a few kilometers downstream of the confluence of the Bío Bío and Bureo rivers.

== History ==
The town has its origins in the fort San Francisco de Borja founded near the hill Mesamávida in 1603 by Governor Alonso de Ribera. This was 10 km to the northeast of the present location of the town, near the confluence of the Bio Bio River and the Duqueco River, on the north shore of this last river. In 1613 Ribera moved to the fort to atop Mesamávida, renamed Cerro Negrete. In 1621, Pedro Osores de Ulloa rebuilt the fort and a small village began at the base of the hill. In 1757, Governor Manuel de Amat y Juniet, granted the town the title of Villa de Negrete. In 1777, a new fort San Agustín de Mesamávida was built on the Cerro Negrete by Ambrosio O' Higgins by order of Governor Agustín de Jáuregui.

In March 1793 the plains nearby were the location of the Parliament of Negrete where peace was agreed between the Spanish Empire and the Mapuche. It was again destroyed by the Mapuche in 1859. It was not rebuilt until 1861 when a new strong fort was built near the present location of the town.

== Demographics ==
According to the 2002 census of the National Statistics Institute, Negrete spans an area of 156.5 km^{2} (60 sq mi) and has 8,579 inhabitants (4,414 men and 4,165 women). Of these, 5,283 (61.6%) lived in urban areas and 3,296 (38.4%) in rural areas. The population grew by 2.8% (232 persons) between the 1992 and 2002 censuses.

== Administration ==
As a commune, Negrete is a third-level administrative division of Chile administered by a municipal council, headed by an alcalde who is directly elected every four years. The 2013-2016 alcalde is Javier Melo Márquez (Independent).

Within the electoral divisions of Chile, Negrete is represented in the Chamber of Deputies by Joel Rosales Guzmán (UDI) and José Pérez Arriagada (PRSD) as part of the 47th electoral district, together with Los Ángeles, Tucapel, Antuco, Quilleco, Santa Bárbara, Quilaco, Mulchén, Nacimiento, San Rosendo, Laja and Alto Bío Bío. The commune is represented in the Senate by Victor Pérez Varela (UDI) and Mariano Ruiz-Esquide Jara (PDC) as part of the 13th senatorial constituency (Bío Bío-Coast).
