= Quilleco =

- Town and Commune
- Coat of arms Location of commune in the Bío Bío Region Location in Chile
- Coordinates: 37°28′S 71°58′W
- Country: Chile
- Region: Bío Bío
- Province: Bío Bío

Government
  - Type: Municipality
  - Alcalde: Jaime Quilodrán Acuña (ILE)

Area
  - Total: 1,121.8 km^{2} (433.1 sq mi)
- Elevation: 366 m (1,201 ft)

Population (2017 Census)
  - Total: 9.587
  - Density: 0.008546/km^{2} (0.02213/sq mi)

Sex
  - Men: 4.720
  - Women: 4.867
- Time zone: UTC-4 (CLT)
  - Summer (DST): UTC-3 (CLST)
- Area code: 56 + 43
- Website: Municipality of Quilleco

Quilleco (literally means "water of tears") is a Chilean town and commune located in the Bío Bío Province, Bío Bío Region.

== Demographics ==
According to the 2002 census of the National Statistics Institute, Quilleco spans an area of 1,121.8 km^{2} (433 sq mi) and has 10,428 inhabitants (5,378 men and 5,050 women). Of these, 5,486 (52.6%) lived in urban areas and 4,942 (47.4%) in rural areas. Between the 1992 and 2002 censuses, the population fell by 0.6% (64 persons).

== Economy ==
The principal economic activity of the area is agriculture with traditional crops such as beets and wheat in addition with vast plantations of exotic radiata pine and eucalyptus. Another important activity is the generation of electric energy with two electric grids at Rucúe and Quilleco, the latter of which was inaugurated 23 July 2007 by former president Michelle Bachelet. It treats and utilizes the flowing waters of the Laja River and its tributaries. Rucúe has a 160 MW installed potential, and its average annual generation is 1.190 GWh. Quilleco has a 70 MW installed potential, and it generates an average annual of 450 GWh.

== Administration ==
As a commune, Quilleco is a third-level administrative division of Chile administered by a municipal council, headed by an alcalde who is directly elected every four years. The 2008-2012 alcalde is Rodrigo Tapia Avello (ILE). The municipal council has the following members:

- Sergio Daniel Espinoza Almendras (PDC)
- Claudio Velosos Vallejos (ILE)
- Miriam Soto Quezada (PRSD)
- Omar Parra Lagos (ILA)
- German Sepulveda Mellado (PS)
- Eduardo Bartholomaus Strick (UDI)

Within the electoral divisions of Chile, Quilleco is represented in the Chamber of Deputies by Juan Lobos (UDI) and José Pérez (PRSD) as part of the 47th electoral district, together with Los Ángeles, Tucapel, Antuco, Santa Bárbara, Quilaco, Mulchén, Negrete, Nacimiento, San Rosendo, Laja and Alto Bío Bío. The commune is represented in the Senate by Victor Pérez Varela (UDI) and Mariano Ruiz-Esquide Jara (PDC) as part of the 13th senatorial constituency (Biobío-Coast).
