= María Dolores Airport =

- IATA: LSQ; ICAO: SCGE

Summary
- Airport type: Public
- Serves: Los Ángeles, Chile
- Elevation AMSL: 374 ft / 114 m
- Coordinates: 37°24′05″S 72°25′30″W

Map
- Location of María Dolores Airport in Chile

Runways
Direction	Length		Surface
Direction	m	ft	Surface
18/36	1,705	5,594	Asphalt
- Source: Landings.com Google Maps GCM

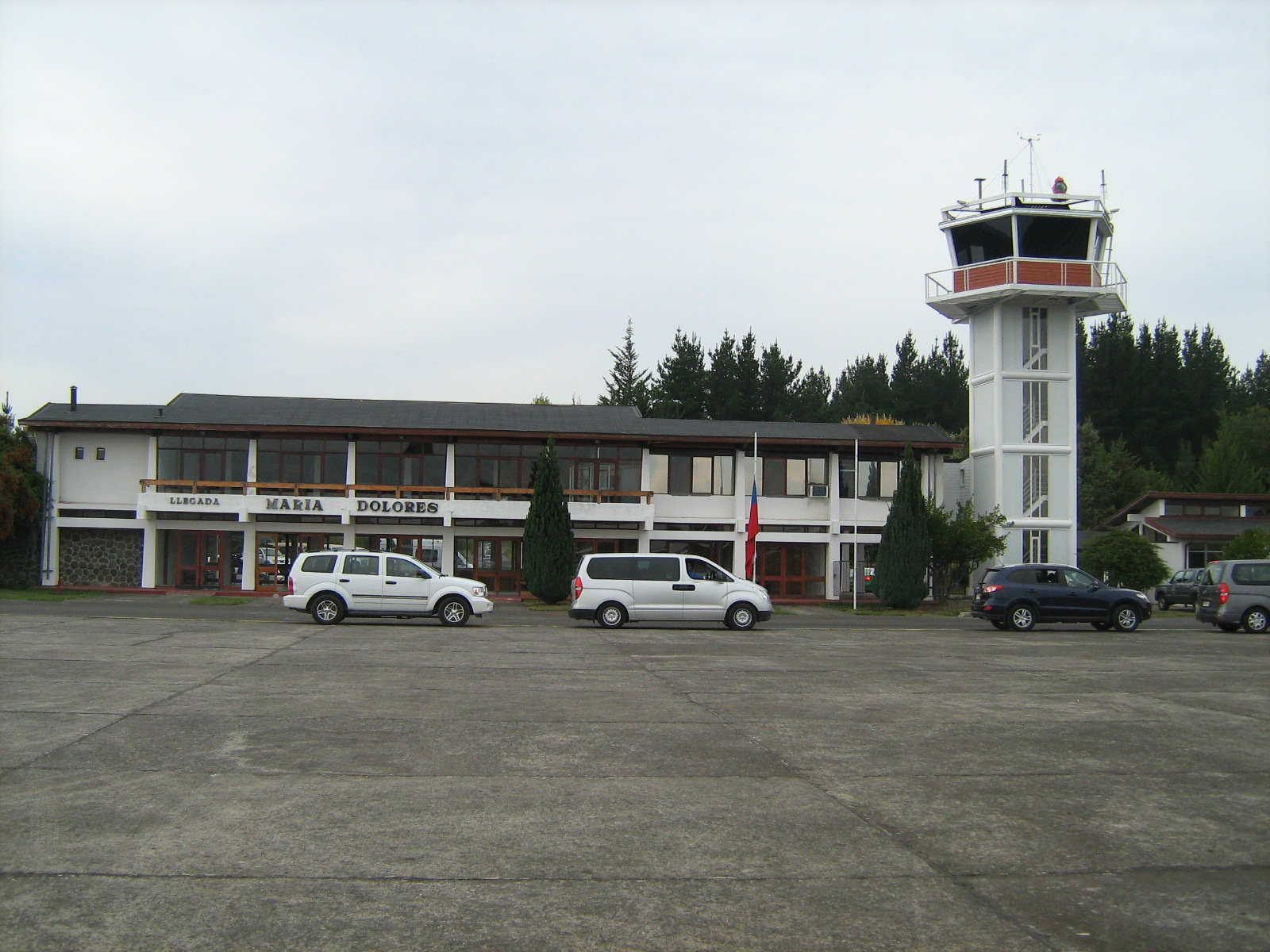

María Dolores Airport (Spanish: Aeródromo María Dolores) (IATA: LSQ, ICAO: SCGE) is an airport serving Los Ángeles, capital of Bío Bío Province in the Bío Bío Region of Chile.

The airport is 9 kilometres (5.6 mi) northwest of the city.

The Los Angeles VOR (Ident: MAD) is located on the field.

== See also ==
- Transport in Chile
- List of airports in Chile
