= San Rosendo =

- City and Commune
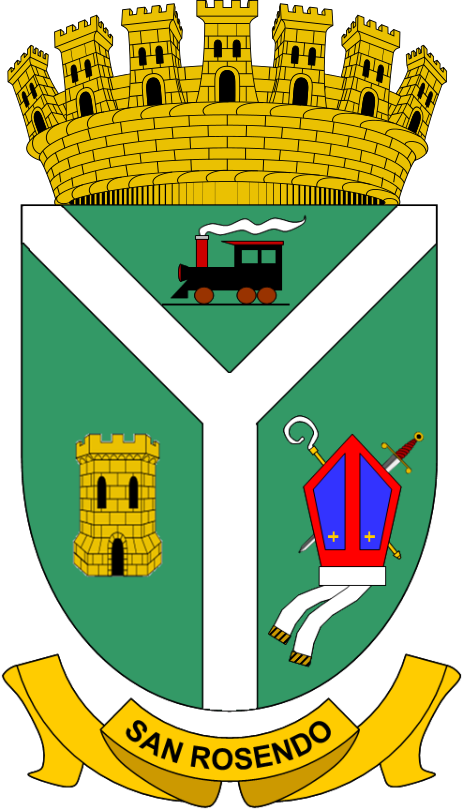
- Coat of arms Commune of San Rosendo in the Bío Bío Region Location in Chile
- Coordinates: 37°15′48″S 72°43′27″W
- Country: Chile
- Region: Bío Bío Region
- Province: Bío Bío Province

Government
  - Type: Municipality
  - Alcalde: Duverlis Valenzuela Martínez (RN)

Area
  - Total: 92.4 km^{2} (35.7 sq mi)
- Elevation: 68 m (223 ft)

Population (2012 Census)
  - Total: 3,398
  - Density: 36.8/km^{2} (95.2/sq mi)
  - Urban: 3,249
  - Rural: 669

Sex
  - Men: 1,930
  - Women: 1,988
- Time zone: UTC−4 (CLT)
  - Summer (DST): UTC−3 (CLST)
- Area code: 56 + 43
- Website: www.municipalidadsanrosendo.cl

San Rosendo (Spanish pronunciation: [san roˈsendo]) is a Chilean city and commune in Bío Bío Province, Bío Bío Region.

The city of San Rosendo lies on the gentle slopes of a hill overlooking the confluence of the rivers Bío Bío and Laja, which respectively bound the city to the west and south. On the opposite bank of the Laja River is the city of Laja, forming both an incipient conurbation.

== History ==
San Rosendo was first a fort built by the Royal Governor Martín García Óñez de Loyola in 1593. It was destroyed and burned by the Mapuche in 1655, it recovered later but did not survive the rising of the Mapuche in 1723. The current settlement grew up around the railroad station in the same location in the later 19th century.

== Demographics ==
According to the 2002 census of the National Statistics Institute, San Rosendo spans an area of 92.4 km^{2} (36 sq mi) and has 3,918 inhabitants (1,930 men and 1,988 women). Of these, 3,249 (82.9%) lived in urban areas and 669 (17.1%) in rural areas. The population fell by 10.4% (457 persons) between the 1992 and 2002 censuses.

== Administration ==
As a commune, San Rosendo is a third-level administrative division of Chile administered by a municipal council, headed by an alcalde who is directly elected every four years. The 2008-2012 alcalde is Duverlis Valenzuela Martínez (RN).

Within the electoral divisions of Chile, San Rosendo is represented in the Chamber of Deputies by Juan Lobos (UDI) and José Pérez (PRSD) as part of the 47th electoral district, together with Los Ángeles, Tucapel, Antuco, Quilleco, Santa Bárbara, Quilaco, Mulchén, Negrete, Nacimiento, Laja and Alto Bío Bío. The commune is represented in the Senate by Victor Pérez Varela (UDI) and Mariano Ruiz-Esquide Jara (PDC) as part of the 13th senatorial constituency (Biobío-Coast).
