= Administrative divisions of Chile =

The administrative division or territorial organization of Chile exemplifies characteristics of a unitary state. State administration is functionally and geographically decentralized, as appropriate for each authority in accordance with the law.

For the interior government and administration within the State, the territory of the republic has been divided into 16 regions (regiones), 56 provinces (provincias) and 346 communes (comunas) since the 1970s process of reform, made at the request of the National Commission on Administrative Reform (Comisión Nacional de la Reforma Administrativa or CONARA). State agencies exist to promote the strengthening of its regionalization, equitable development and solidarity between regions, provinces and communes within the nation.

Since 2005, the creation, abolition and designation of regions, provinces and communes, the altering of their boundaries, and the establishment of the regional and provincial capitals are part of constitutional law.

The Ministries of Chile (except the Ministries of the Interior, National Defense, Foreign Affairs and Secretary General of the Presidency) are devolved to regional level, being represented by regional ministries, integrating the so-called "regional cabinet," chaired by the regional intendent.

== History ==
The political and administrative division of Chile has had four major periods: before 1833, from 1833 to 1925, from 1925 to 1976 and from 1976 onwards.

Before 1974, Chile was divided into:

1. Provinces (provincias) - First level
2. Departments (departamentos) - Second level

In October 2007, two new regions came into force: The I Tarapacá Region was divided laterally to create XV Arica and Parinacota Region to the north, and similarly, the X Los Lagos Region was split to create XIV Los Ríos Region to its north. Also there are plans to create a joint region between the provinces of Linares and Cauquenes by splitting the VII Maule Region.

On March 11, 2010, the creation of the Marga Marga Province gave Chile a new total of 56 provinces.

== Current structure ==
Regions of Chile by their Roman numeral.

Chile is administratively divided into:

1. 16 Regions (regiones) - First level administrative division
2. 56 Provinces (provincias) - Second level administrative division
3. 346 Communes (comunas) - Third level administrative division

=== Regions ===
The regional government is headed by a popularly elected governor and a regional presidential delegation, who represents the President of Chile in the region.

=== Provinces ===
The government and administration of each province lies in the provincial governorate (Gobernación Provincial), headed by a governor (gobernador), appointed by the President of the Republic. It exercises its powers in accordance with the instructions from the regional intendant. It is advised by the Provincial Economic and Social Council (Consejo Económico y Social Provincial or CESPRO).

The only exception is the Santiago Province, which makes no provision for a provincial governorate in its regulations. Instead, the position corresponds to the intendant of the Metropolitan Region of Santiago. In January 2001, the Provincial Delegation of Santiago was created with the position of a Provincial Delegate, who exercises the functions of a provincial governor on behalf of the respective intendant.

=== Municipalities ===
The local administration of each commune or group of communities resides in the municipality (municipalidad), consisting of an alcalde and a communal council (Consejo Comunal), elected directly for a period of 4 years renewable.

Municipalities represent the decentralization of central power. They are advised by an Economic and Social Communal Council (Consejo Económico y Social Comunal or CESCO), composed of representatives from the most important of the community's organizations and activities.

There are 346 communes and 345 municipalities, as the municipality of Cabo de Hornos manages the grouping of communities of Cape Horn and Antártica. There are proposals to create a number of new communities to be studied by the Secretariat of Regional and Administrative Development (Subsecretaría de Desarrollo Regional y Administrativo or SUBDERE).

=== Current list of administrative divisions ===
Region	Capital	Provinces	Capital	Communes
Arica and Parinacota Region	Arica	Arica	Arica	Arica; Camarones
Arica and Parinacota Region	Arica	Parinacota	Putre	General Lagos; Putre
Tarapacá Region	Iquique	El Tamarugal	Pozo Almonte	Camiña; Colchane; Huara; Pica; Pozo Almonte
Tarapacá Region	Iquique	Iquique	Iquique	Iquique; Alto Hospicio
Antofagasta Region	Antofagasta	Tocopilla	Tocopilla	María Elena; Tocopilla
Antofagasta Region	Antofagasta	El Loa	Calama	Calama; Ollagüe; San Pedro de Atacama
Antofagasta Region	Antofagasta	Antofagasta	Antofagasta	Antofagasta; Mejillones; Sierra Gorda; Taltal
Atacama Region	Copiapó	Chañaral	Chañaral	Chañaral; Diego de Almagro
Atacama Region	Copiapó	Copiapó	Copiapó	Copiapó; Caldera; Tierra Amarilla
Atacama Region	Copiapó	Huasco	Vallenar	Vallenar; Freirina; Huasco; Alto del Carmen
Coquimbo Region	La Serena	Elqui	Coquimbo	Andacollo; Coquimbo; La Higuera; La Serena; Paiguano; Vicuña
Coquimbo Region	La Serena	Limarí	Ovalle	Ovalle; Río Hurtado; Monte Patria; Combarbalá; Punitaqui
Coquimbo Region	La Serena	Choapa	Illapel	Illapel; Salamanca; Los Vilos; Canela
Valparaíso Region	Valparaíso	Petorca	La Ligua	La Ligua; Cabildo; Zapallar; Papudo; Petorca
Valparaíso Region	Valparaíso	Los Andes	Los Andes	Los Andes; San Esteban; Calle Larga; Rinconada
Valparaíso Region	Valparaíso	San Felipe de Aconcagua	San Felipe	San Felipe; Llaillay; Putaendo; Santa María; Catemu; Panquehue
Valparaíso Region	Valparaíso	Quillota	Quillota	Quillota; La Calera; Nogales; Hijuelas; La Cruz
Valparaíso Region	Valparaíso	Valparaíso	Valparaíso	Valparaíso; Viña del Mar; Concón; Quintero; Puchuncaví; Casablanca; Juan Fernández
Valparaíso Region	Valparaíso	Marga Marga	Quilpué	Quilpué; Limache; Olmué; Villa Alemana
Valparaíso Region	Valparaíso	San Antonio	San Antonio	Algarrobo; El Quisco; El Tabo; Cartagena; San Antonio; Santo Domingo
Valparaíso Region	Valparaíso	Isla de Pascua	Hanga Roa	Isla de Pascua
Región del Libertador General Bernardo O'Higgins	Rancagua	Cachapoal	Rancagua	Codegua; Coínco; Coltauco; Doñihue; Graneros; Las Cabras; Machalí; Malloa; Olivar; Peumo; Pichidegua; Quinta de Tilcoco; Rancagua; Requínoa; Rengo; Mostazal; San Vicente de Tagua Tagua
Región del Libertador General Bernardo O'Higgins	Rancagua	Colchagua	San Fernando	Chépica; Chimbarongo; Lolol; Nancagua; Palmilla; Peralillo; Placilla; Pumanque; San Fernando; Santa Cruz
Región del Libertador General Bernardo O'Higgins	Rancagua	Cardenal Caro	Pichilemu	La Estrella; Litueche; Marchigüe; Navidad; Paredones; Pichilemu
Maule Region	Talca	Curicó	Curicó	Curicó; Hualañé; Licantén; Molina; Rauco; Romeral; Sagrada Familia, Chile; Teno; Vichuquén
Maule Region	Talca	Talca	Talca	Talca; San Clemente; Pelarco; Pencahue; Maule; San Rafael; Curepto; Constitución; Empedrado; Río Claro
Maule Region	Talca	Linares	Linares	Linares; San Javier de Loncomilla; Parral; Villa Alegre; Longaví; Colbún; Retiro; Yerbas Buenas
Maule Region	Talca	Cauquenes	Cauquenes	Cauquenes; Chanco; Pelluhue
Ñuble Region	Chillán	Itata	Quirihue	Cobquecura; Coelemu; Ninhue; Portezuelo; Quirihue; Ránquil; Treguaco
Ñuble Region	Chillán	Diguillín	Bulnes	Bulnes; Chillán; Chillán Viejo; El Carmen; Pemuco; Pinto; Quillón; San Ignacio; Yungay
Ñuble Region	Chillán	Punilla	San Carlos	Coihueco; Ñiquén; San Carlos; San Fabián; San Nicolás
Biobío Region	Concepción	Biobío	Los Ángeles	Alto Biobío; Antuco; Cabrero; Laja; Los Ángeles; Mulchén; Nacimiento; Negrete; Quilaco; Quilleco; San Rosendo; Santa Bárbara; Tucapel; Yumbel
Biobío Region	Concepción	Concepción	Concepción	Concepción; Coronel; Chiguayante; Florida; Hualpén; Hualqui; Lota; Penco; San Pedro de la Paz; Santa Juana; Talcahuano; Tomé
Biobío Region	Concepción	Arauco	Lebu	Arauco; Cañete; Contulmo; Curanilahue; Lebu; Los Álamos; Tirúa
Araucanía Region	Temuco	Malleco	Angol	Angol; Collipulli; Curacautín; Ercilla; Lonquimay; Los Sauces; Lumaco; Purén; Renaico; Traiguén; Victoria
Araucanía Region	Temuco	Cautín	Temuco	Temuco; Carahue; Cholchol; Cunco; Curarrehue; Freire; Galvarino; Gorbea; Lautaro; Loncoche; Melipeuco; Nueva Imperial; Padre Las Casas; Perquenco; Pitrufquén; Pucón; Saavedra; Teodoro Schmidt; Toltén; Vilcún; Villarrica
Los Ríos Region	Valdivia	Valdivia	Valdivia	Valdivia; Corral; Lanco; Los Lagos; Mariquina; Máfil; Paillaco; Panguipulli
Los Ríos Region	Valdivia	Ranco	La Unión	La Unión; Futrono; Lago Ranco; Río Bueno
Los Lagos Region	Puerto Montt	Osorno	Osorno	Osorno; Puerto Octay; Purranque; Puyehue; Río Negro; San Pablo; San Juan de la Costa
Los Lagos Region	Puerto Montt	Llanquihue	Puerto Montt	Calbuco; Cochamó; Fresia; Frutillar; Llanquihue; Los Muermos; Maullín; Puerto Montt; Puerto Varas
Los Lagos Region	Puerto Montt	Chiloé	Castro	Ancud; Castro; Chonchi; Curaco de Vélez; Dalcahue; Puqueldón; Queilén; Quellón; Quemchi; Quinchao
Los Lagos Region	Puerto Montt	Palena	Chaitén	Futaleufú; Hualaihué; Palena
Aysén del General Carlos Ibáñez del Campo Region	Coihaique	Coihaique	Coihaique	Coihaique; Lago Verde
Aysén del General Carlos Ibáñez del Campo Region	Coihaique	Aisén	Puerto Aisén	Aisén; Cisnes; Guaitecas
Aysén del General Carlos Ibáñez del Campo Region	Coihaique	General Carrera	Chile Chico	Chile Chico; Río Ibáñez
Aysén del General Carlos Ibáñez del Campo Region	Coihaique	Capitán Prat	Cochrane	Cochrane; O'Higgins; Tortel
Magallanes and Antártica Chilena Region	Punta Arenas	Última Esperanza	Puerto Natales	Puerto Natales; Torres del Paine
Magallanes and Antártica Chilena Region	Punta Arenas	Magallanes	Punta Arenas	Laguna Blanca; Punta Arenas; Río Verde; San Gregorio
Magallanes and Antártica Chilena Region	Punta Arenas	Tierra del Fuego	Porvenir	Porvenir; Primavera; Timaukel
Magallanes and Antártica Chilena Region	Punta Arenas	Antártica Chilena	Puerto Williams	Cabo de Hornos; Antártica
Santiago Metropolitan Region (RM)	Santiago	Chacabuco	Colina	Colina; Lampa; Tiltil
Santiago Metropolitan Region (RM)	Santiago	Cordillera	Puente Alto	Puente Alto; San José de Maipo; Pirque
Santiago Metropolitan Region (RM)	Santiago	Maipo	San Bernardo	San Bernardo; Buin; Paine; Calera de Tango
Santiago Metropolitan Region (RM)	Santiago	Talagante	Talagante	Isla de Maipo; El Monte; Padre Hurtado; Peñaflor; Talagante
Santiago Metropolitan Region (RM)	Santiago	Melipilla	Melipilla	Curacaví; María Pinto; Melipilla; San Pedro; Alhué
Santiago Metropolitan Region (RM)	Santiago	Santiago	Santiago	Cerrillos; Cerro Navia; Conchalí; El Bosque; Estación Central; Huechuraba; Independencia; La Cisterna; La Granja; La Florida; La Pintana; La Reina; Las Condes; Lo Barnechea; Lo Espejo; Lo Prado; Macul; Maipú; Ñuñoa; Pedro Aguirre Cerda; Peñalolén; Providencia; Pudahuel; Quilicura; Quinta Normal; Recoleta; Renca; San Miguel; San Joaquín; San Ramón; Santiago; Vitacura

== Proposed structural changes ==
SUBDERE continues to examine the proposed creation of the provinces of Villarrica, San Carlos, Admiral Simpson, Aconcagua and others.
