= Mulchén =

City and commune in Bío Bío, Chile

- City and Commune
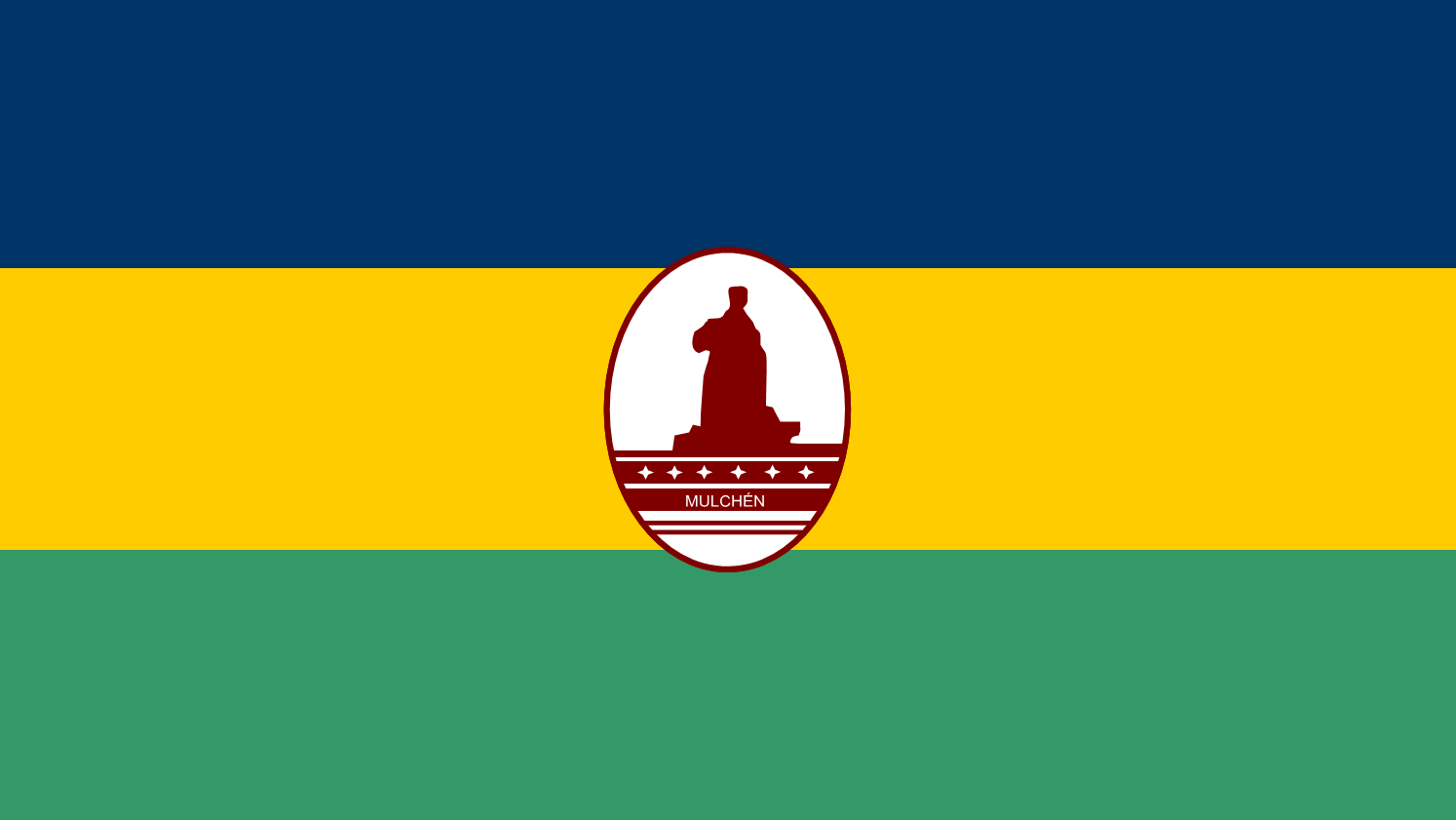
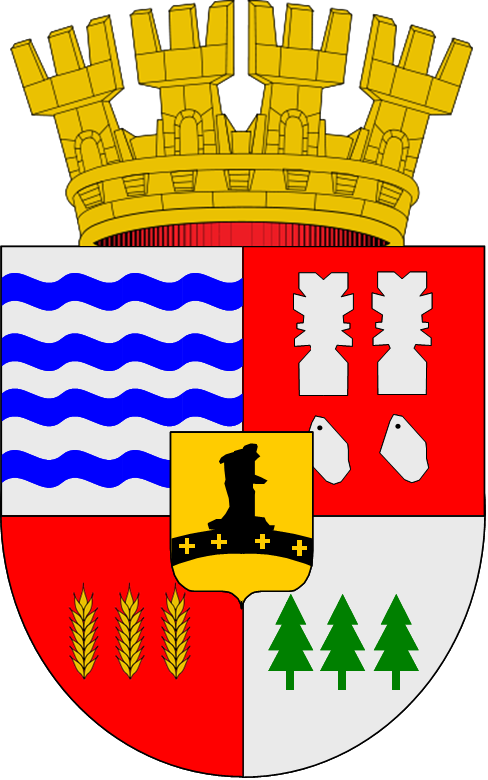
- Flag Coat of arms Map of the Mulchén commune in the Bío Bío Region Location in Chile
- Coordinates (city): 37°43′0″S 72°14′0″W
- Country: Chile
- Region: Bío Bío
- Province: Bío Bío
- Founded: November 30, 1875

Government
  - Type: Municipality
  - Alcalde: Nicolas Benjamin Cuevas Cuevas (UDI)

Area
  - Total: 1,925.3 km^{2} (743.4 sq mi)
- Elevation: 116 m (381 ft)

Population (2012 Census)
  - Total: 27,557
  - Density: 14.313/km^{2} (37.071/sq mi)
  - Urban: 21,819
  - Rural: 7,184
- Demonym: Mulchenino

Sex
  - Men: 14,513
  - Women: 14,490
- Time zone: UTC−4 (CLT)
  - Summer (DST): UTC−3 (CLST)
- Postal code: 4530000
- Area code: 56 + 43
- Website: Official website (in Spanish)

Mulchén is a city and commune in Bío Bío Province of Bío Bío Region, Chile. It was first settled in 1871 by soldiers during the so-called Pacification of Araucania. In 1875 Mulchén was officially founded.

The city is surrounded by a meander of the Bureo River on all sides except the south, where it is bounded by the Mulchén River. It is located 32 km south of the city of Los Ángeles, close to Chile Highway 5.

== Demographics ==
According to the 2002 census of the National Statistics Institute, Mulchén spans an area of 1,925.3 km^{2} (743 sq mi) and has 29,003 inhabitants (14,513 men and 14,490 women). Of these, 21,819 (75.2%) lived in urban areas and 7,184 (24.8%) in rural areas. The population fell by 3.1% (931 persons) between the 1992 and 2002 censuses.

== Administration ==
As a commune, Mulchén is a third-level administrative division of Chile administered by a municipal council, headed by an alcalde who is directly elected every four years. The 2008-2012 alcalde is Francisco Jara Delgado (UDI).

Within the electoral divisions of Chile, Mulchén is represented in the Chamber of Deputies by Juan Lobos (UDI) and José Pérez (PRSD) as part of the 47th electoral district, together with Los Ángeles, Tucapel, Antuco, Quilleco, Santa Bárbara, Quilaco, Negrete, Nacimiento, San Rosendo, Laja and Alto Bío Bío. The commune is represented in the Senate by Victor Pérez Varela (UDI) and Mariano Ruiz-Esquide Jara (PDC) as part of the 13th senatorial constituency (Biobío-Coast).

== See also ==
- Bío-Bío Canal
