= Alto Biobío =

Alto Bío Bío
- Commune
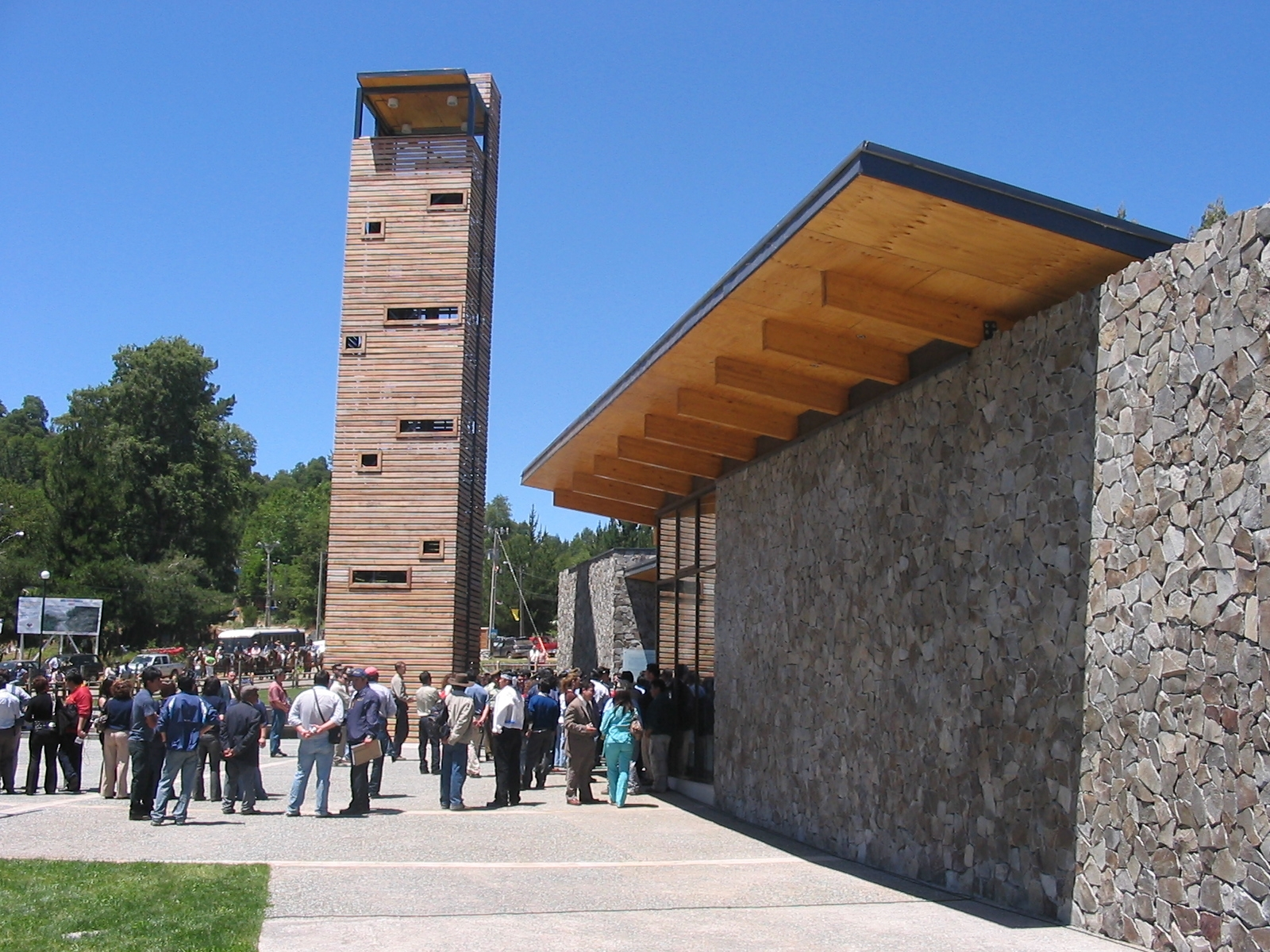
- Ralco Museum

- Location of commune in the Bío Bío Region Location in Chile
- Coordinates: 38°03′S 71°19′W
- Country: Chile
- Region: Bío Bío
- Province: Bío Bío
- Alto Biobío: 25 August 2003

Government
  - Type: Municipality
  - Alcalde: Félix Vita Manqueti (PPD)

Area
  - Total: 2,124.6 km^{2} (820.3 sq mi)
- Elevation: 973 m (3,192 ft)

Population (2017 Census)
  - Total: 5,923
  - Density: 2.788/km^{2} (7.220/sq mi)
- Time zone: UTC-4 (CLT)
  - Summer (DST): UTC-3 (CLST)
- Area code: country 56 + city 43
- Website: Municipality of Alto Bío Bío

Alto Biobío is a commune in central Chile, located in the Province of Biobío, in the Biobío Region.

It is part of District No. 21 of the Deputies and Senate Circumscription, No. 10.

The commune of Alto Biobío is characterized mainly by the presence of the Mapuche Pewenche People, who represent 86% of the commune’s population and who are distributed on the banks of the Queuco and Biobío rivers in 12 different communities, named:

1. Butalelbun
2. Trap Trapa
3. Malla Malla
4. Cauñicu
5. Pitril
6. Callaqui
7. El Avellano
8. Quepuca Ralco
9. Aukin Wallmapu
10. Ralco Lepoy
11. El Barco
12. Guayali

The commune of Alto Biobío spans an area of 2,124.6 km^{2} (820 sq mi).

== Demographics ==
According to the 2002 census of the National Statistics Institute, Alto Bío Bío had 7,027 inhabitants; of these, 1,094 (15.6%) lived in urban areas and 5,933 (84.4%) in rural areas. The population grew by 31.2% (1,671 persons) between the 1992 and 2002 censuses. According to the census in 2017, the commune had a population of 5,923 people.

== History ==
Existing literature barely mentions the area or the Pehuenches. With the installation of a fortified line, associated with the evangelizing activity of the Catholic missionaries in the 18th century small chapters were written. The line went from Rucalhue, passing through Villucura and Santa Bárbara.

There was more information written on the Antuco area (a few dozen kilometers to the north) where there was a strong commercial activity between Creoles and Pehuenches. This is reflected in the travel books of the Polish naturalist Ignacio Domeyko and the Bavarian artist Mauricio Rugendas, who made the first portraits of the indigenous people.

The tranquility of the area was interrupted in the 19th century by the hunts of the Chilean armies of the montoneros still faithful to the Spanish Kingdom or of the bands of rustlers that ravaged the haciendas of the Creoles in the plain (Los Pincheira brothers wrote some of their chapters in Alto Bio Bío).

In the easternmost part of the mountain range a workers revolt took place with tragic death toll.

With these exceptions, the history of the area is only recorded by the Pehuenches, who remained in a condition of virtual isolation. They even chose to market their products in Argentine territory rather than in Chile due to the geographical proximity of the area and ease of access, rather than moving along the winding road to Santa Bárbara

The current commune was created on 25 of August 2003 away from the commune of Santa Barbara. The capital is the town of Ralco.

== Administration ==
As a commune, Alto Bío Bío is a third-level administrative division of Chile administered by a municipal council, headed by an alcalde who is directly elected every four years. The 2008-2012 alcalde is Félix Vita Manqueti (PPD).

Within the electoral divisions of Chile, Alto Bío Bío is represented in the Chamber of Deputies by Juan Lobos (UDI) and José Pérez (PRSD) as part of the 47th electoral district, together with Los Ángeles, Tucapel, Antuco, Quilleco, Santa Bárbara, Quilaco, Mulchén, Negrete, Nacimiento, San Rosendo and Laja. The commune is represented in the Senate by Victor Pérez Varela (UDI) and Mariano Ruiz-Esquide Jara (PDC) as part of the 13th senatorial constituency (Bío Bío-Coast).

This commune is a border zone according to the National Directorate of Borders and Limits of the State of Chile (DIFROL), due to its location close to the international border with the Argentine Republic.

== Economy ==
In 2018, 35 companies were registered in Alto Biobío. The Economic Complexity Index (ECI) in the same year was -0.98, while the economic activities with the highest Revealed Comparative Advantage index (RCA) were Medium Stores for Food Sales, Supermarkets and Minimarkets (48.23), Reproduction and Raising of Marine Fish (42.36) and Primary Education Establishments (32.88).

== Present ==
In May 2013 Copahue volcano erupted. A red alert was decreed and the population in the area near the volcano was evacuated. The army supported the evacuations in the Ralco National Reserve area. The alert was lifted the following week and since then only yellow alerts have been decreed by ONEMI.

== Notable people ==
- Nicolasa Quintremán (1939-2013), activist

== Sources ==
- “The Mapuche in Modern Chile: A Cultural History”. Crow, Joanna. 2012. 2017-03-06.
- “OF CONQUEST AND CIVILIZATION: IGNACIO DOMEYKO AND THE INDIAN QUESTION IN CHILE.” Arreola, Pablo-Raul. 1999, Polish Review, Volume 44, Issue 1, starting on page 69. 2017-03-06.
- “The militant song movement in Latin America”. Lanham, Maryland: Lexington Books, 2014, 1 online resource., English. Contributor – Vila, Pablo 1952 – editor. 2017-03-06.
