= Laja, Chile =

Laja
- City and Commune
- Coat of arms Map of Laja commune in the Bío Bío Region Location in Chile
- Coordinates (city): 37°16′S 72°42′W
- Country: Chile
- Region: Bío Bío
- Province: Bíobío
- Founded: 1891

Government
  - Type: Municipality
  - Alcalde: Vladimir Fica Toledo (ILE)

Area
  - Total: 339.8 km^{2} (131.2 sq mi)
- Elevation: 49 m (161 ft)

Population (2012 Census)
  - Total: 22,288
  - Density: 65.59/km^{2} (169.9/sq mi)
  - Urban: 16,288
  - Rural: 6,116
- Demonym: Lajina

Sex
  - Men: 11,113
  - Women: 11,291
- Time zone: UTC-4 (CLT)
  - Summer (DST): UTC-3 (CLST)
- Area code: country 56 + city 43
- Website: www.munilaja.cl (in Spanish)

Laja is a city and commune located in the Bío Bío Province of the Bío Bío Region of Chile. The city of Laja is the communal capital.

== Geography ==
It is bounded on the north by the Laja River, on the west by the Biobío river, and the south and the east by the commune of Los Ángeles.

== Demographics ==
According to the 2002 census of the National Statistics Institute, Laja spans an area of 339.8 km^{2} (131 sq mi) and has 22,404 inhabitants (11,113 men and 11,291 women). Of these, 16,288 (72.7%) lived in urban areas and 6,116 (27.3%) in rural areas. The population fell by 8% (1946 persons) between the 1992 and 2002 censuses.

Within the commune's territory are: Laja, its capital city; the villages of Las Ciénagas, Villa Laja and Las Playas; and the small villages of Puente Perales, Cantera, Violeta Parra, Cachapoal, La Colonia, Las Ciénagas, Diuquín, Picul, Santiago Chico, Quilales, Chillancito, Las Viñas, Las Lomas, Santa Elena, La Aguada and Arenas Muertas.

== Administration ==
As a commune, Laja is a third-level administrative division of Chile administered by a municipal council, headed by an alcalde who is directly elected every four years. The 2008-2012 alcalde is Vladimir Fica Toledo (ILE).

Within the electoral divisions of Chile, Laja is represented in the Chamber of Deputies by Juan Lobos (UDI) and José Pérez (PRSD) as part of the 47th electoral district, together with Los Ángeles, Tucapel, Antuco, Quilleco, Santa Bárbara, Quilaco, Mulchén, Negrete, Nacimiento, San Rosendo and Alto Bío Bío. The commune is represented in the Senate by Victor Pérez Varela (UDI) and Mariano Ruiz-Esquide Jara (PDC) as part of the 13th senatorial constituency (Biobío-Coast).
