= Tumbes Peninsula =

Geomorphological feature near Talcahuano, Chile

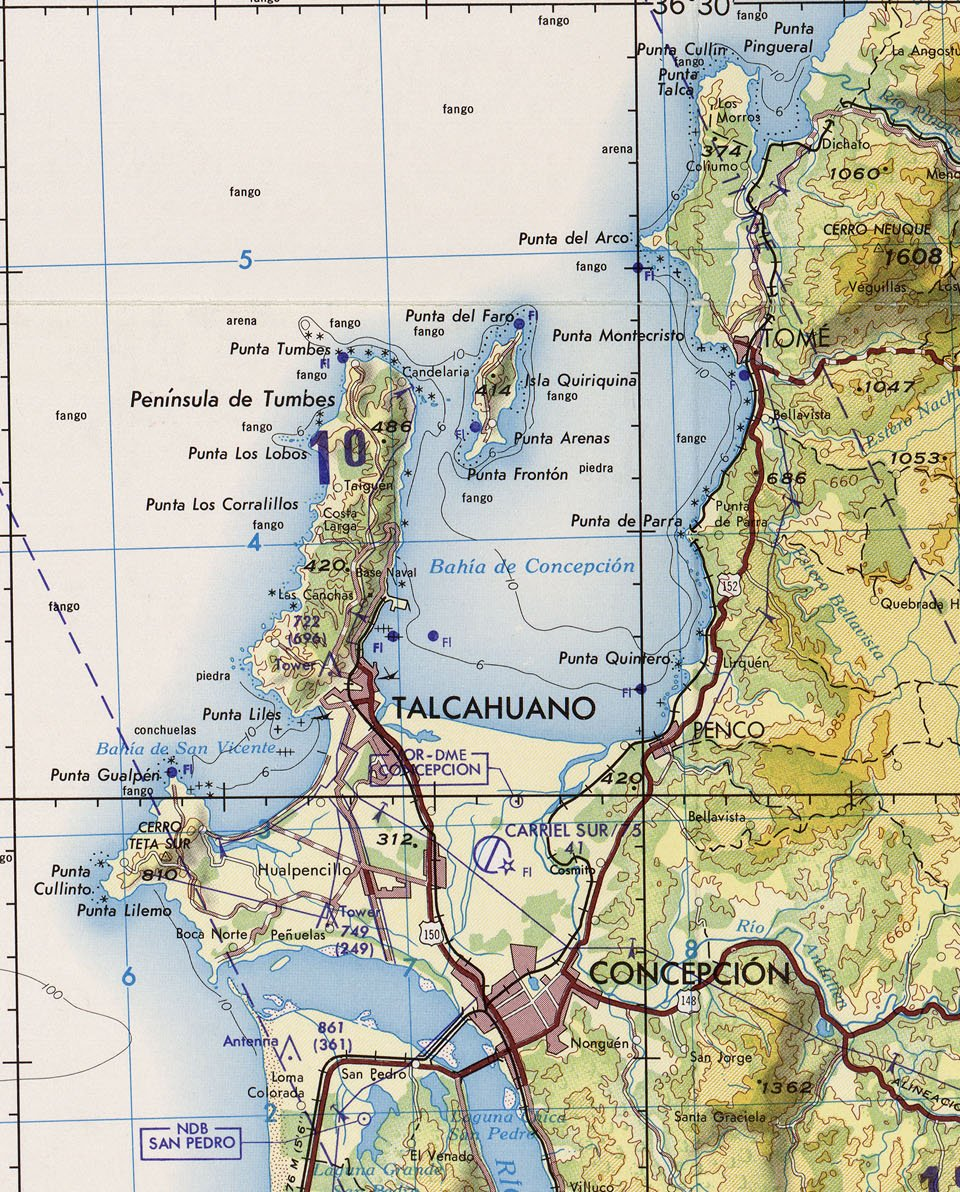

Tumbes Peninsula is a peninsula in Bío Bío Region, Chile. It connects to the mainland through the Plains of Talcahuano where the city of Talcahuano is located. The peninsula points northward, making the city of Talcahuano an excellent port and allowing port facilities and harbours to be located in its east side. Most of the peninsula is covered by monocultures of exotic trees which are harvested by clearcutting.
