= Nacimiento, Chile =

Nacimiento
- City and Commune
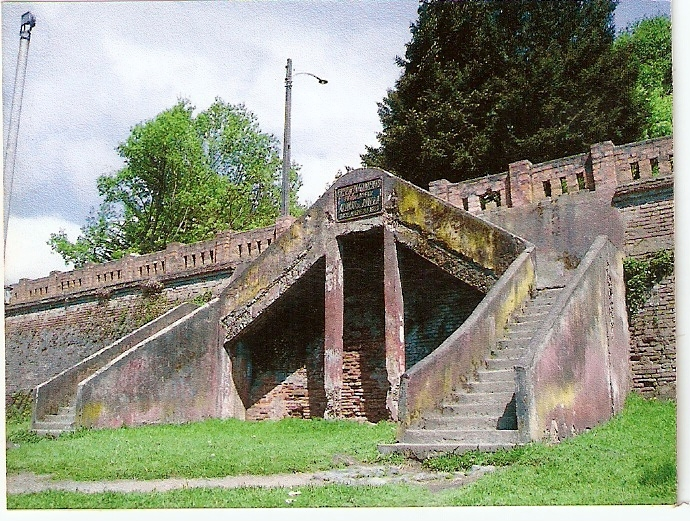

- Flag Coat of arms Location of Nacimiento commune in the Bío Bío Region Location in Chile
- Coordinates (city): 37°30′S 72°40′W
- Country: Chile
- Region: Bío Bío
- Province: Bío Bío
- Founded: 1603

Government
  - Type: Municipality
  - Alcalde: Hugo Inostroza Ramírez

Area
  - Total: 934.9 km^{2} (361.0 sq mi)
- Elevation: 57 m (187 ft)

Population (2012 Census)
  - Total: 26,523
  - Density: 28.37/km^{2} (73.48/sq mi)
  - Urban: 20,884
  - Rural: 5,087
- Demonym: Nacimentano

Sex
  - Men: 13,090
  - Women: 12,881
- Time zone: UTC−4 (CLT)
  - Summer (DST): UTC−3 (CLST)
- Area code: 56 + 43
- Website: Official website (in Spanish)

Nacimiento (Spanish pronunciation: [nasiˈmjento], English: Birth) is a Chilean city situated in the Bío Bío Province, Bío Bío Region, 550 km (342 mi) south of Santiago, and 104 km (65 mi) from the closest major city in the region, Concepción.

It was first used as a fort for the Spanish army to advance and control the territory, and it was officially baptised on Christmas Eve of December 1603 with the name of Nacimiento de Nuestro Señor (Nativity of Our Lord). Destroyed in the later risings of the Mapuche and repaired in 1665, 1724 and for the last time in 1739, it was transferred with its inhabitants in 1749 to the site of the current town.

For a long time it was considered the last frontier of Chile, but after the arrival of foreign investors and developers it became a prosperous city. The Palacio Gleisner is testament to that early prosperity.

Among the rivers that surround the city include the Bío Bío and the Vergara rivers. Industrial practices of lumber companies such as Mininco, Inforsa and Santa Fé (among others) have caused contaminants to pollute the waters of the Vergara River, which was the life source of local agricultural cultivation.

== Demographics ==
According to the 2002 census of the National Statistics Institute, Nacimiento spans an area of 934.9 km^{2} (361 sq mi) and has 25,971 inhabitants (13,090 men and 12,881 women). Of these, 20,884 (80.4%) lived in urban areas and 5,087 (19.6%) in rural areas. The population fell by 0.1% (23 persons) between the 1992 and 2002 censuses. The town of Nacimiento comprises about 1.4% of the total population of the region.

== Administration ==
As a commune, Nacimiento is a third-level administrative division of Chile administered by a municipal council, headed by an alcalde who is directly elected every four years. The 2008-2012 alcalde is Gerardo Montes Cisternas (PS).

Within the electoral divisions of Chile, Nacimiento is represented in the Chamber of Deputies by Juan Lobos (UDI) and José Pérez (PRSD) as part of the 47th electoral district, together with Los Ángeles, Tucapel, Antuco, Quilleco, Santa Bárbara, Quilaco, Mulchén, Negrete, San Rosendo, Laja and Alto Bío Bío. The commune is represented in the Senate by Victor Pérez Varela (UDI) and Mariano Ruiz-Esquide Jara (PDC) as part of the 13th senatorial constituency (Biobío-Coast).
