= Mulchén River =

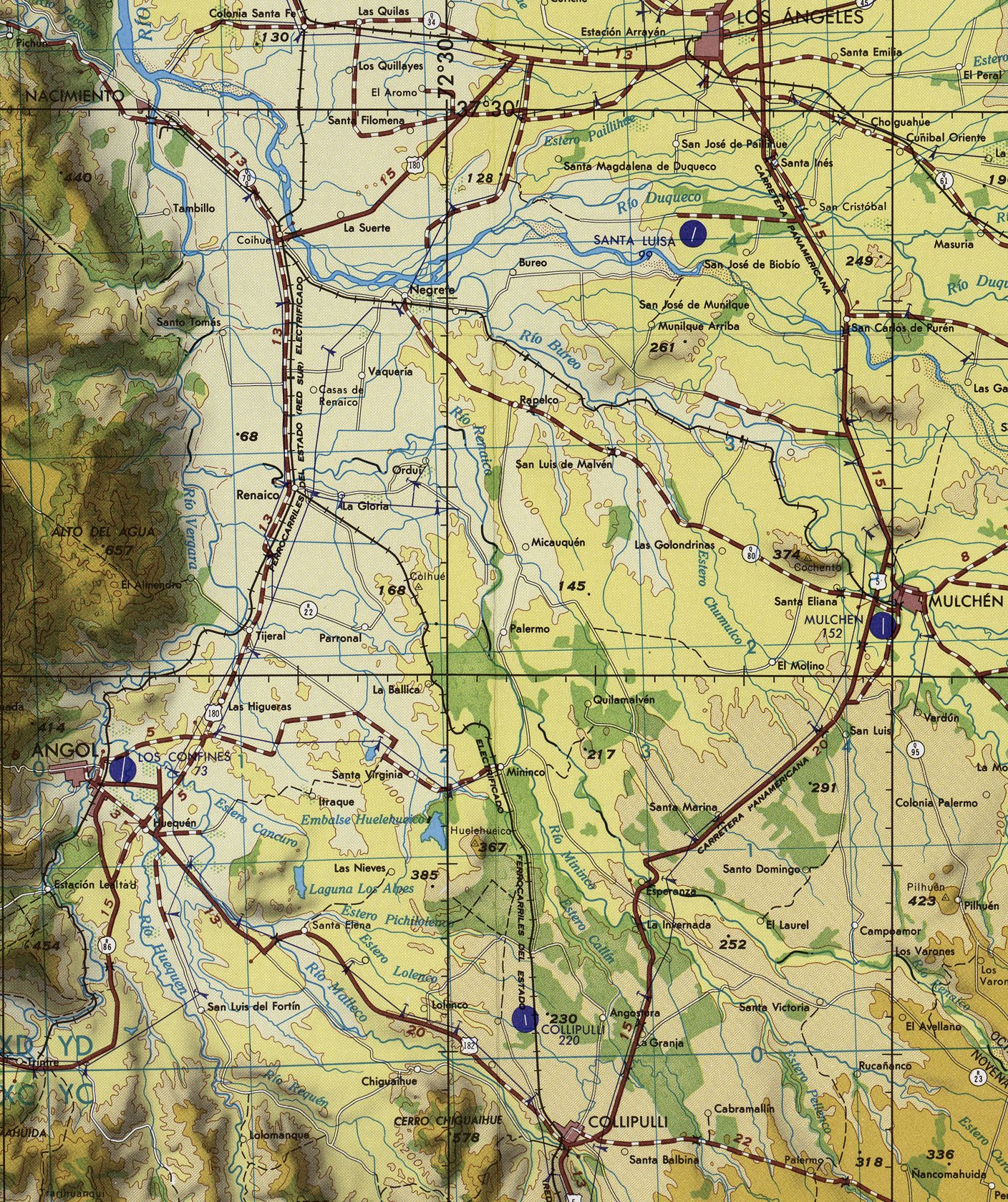

Location
- Country: Chile

Physical characteristics
- Mouth: Bureo River
  - location: Mulchén
  - coordinates: 37°43′11″S 72°15′38″W

The Mulchén River is a river of Chile.

== See also ==
- List of rivers of Chile
