= Los Ángeles, Chile =

Los Ángeles
- City and Commune
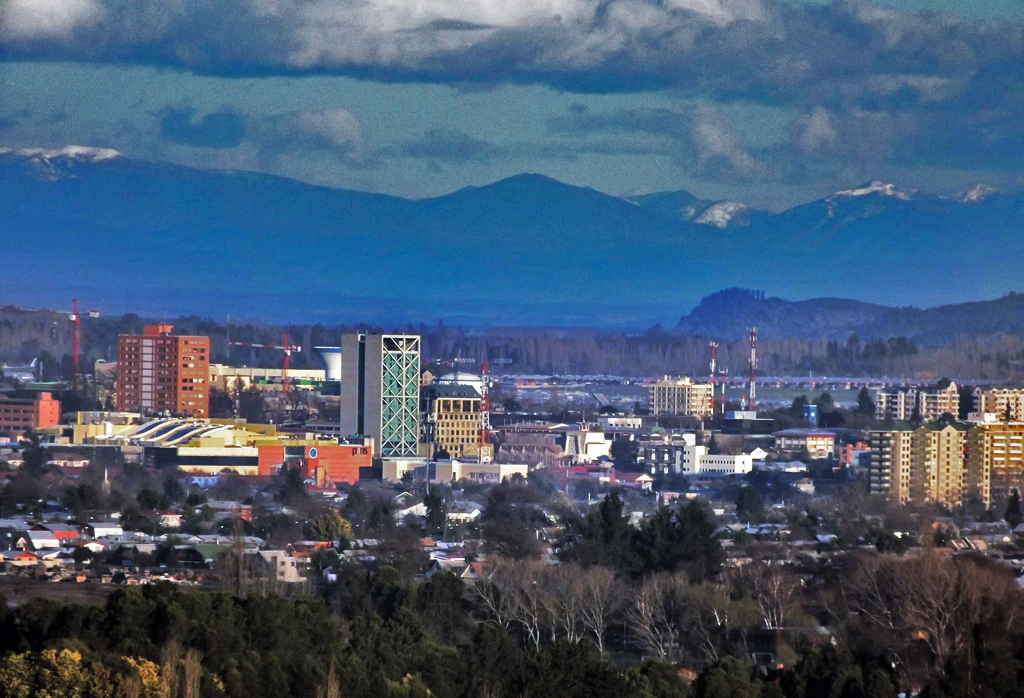
- View of Los Ángeles from the Cerro Curamávida.

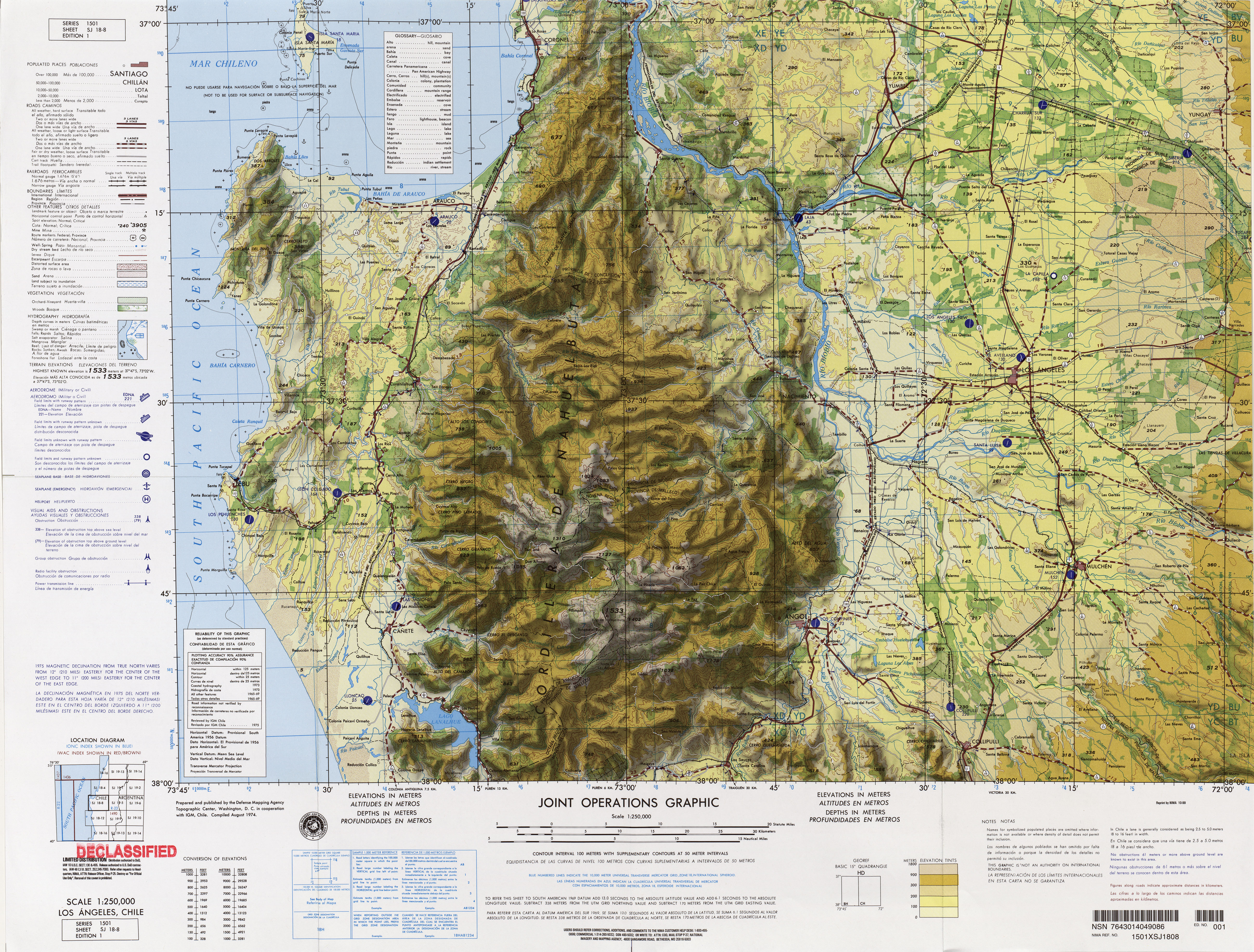
- Flag Coat of arms Map of the Los Ángeles commune in Bío Bío Region Location in Chile
- Coordinates (city): 37°28′S 72°21′W
- Country: Chile
- Region: Bío Bío
- Province: Bío Bío
- Founded as: Villa de Nuestra Señora de Los Ángeles
- Founded: May 26, 1739
- Named for: Our Lady, Queen of the Angels

Government
  - Type: Municipality
  - Alcalde: Esteban Krause

Area
  - Total: 1,748.2 km^{2} (675.0 sq mi)
- Elevation: 139 m (456 ft)

Population (24 Census)
  - Total: 219,441
  - Density: 125.52/km^{2} (325.11/sq mi)
- Demonym: Angelian

Sex
  - Men: 105436
  - Women: 114005
- Time zone: UTC−4 (CLT)
  - Summer (DST): UTC−3 (CLST)
- Postal code: 4440000
- Area code: 56 + 43
- Website: Official website (in Spanish)

Los Ángeles (Spanish pronunciation: [los ˈaŋxeles]) is the capital of the province of Bío Bío, in the commune of the same name, in Bío Bío, in the center-south of Chile. It is located between the Laja and Biobío rivers. The population is 219,441 inhabitants (census 2024). The municipality ("comuna") of Los Ángeles has the highest absolute rural population of any Chilean municipality.

To the north of the city is Salto del Laja (Laja Falls), and roughly 100 kilometers to the east is the 2,979 meters (9,774 feet) high Antuco volcano, in the Andes mountain range. The city is a gateway for tourists visiting the nearby Laguna del Laja National Park, the location of the volcano.

Los Ángeles is served by María Dolores Airport.

== History ==
Founded as Nuestra Señora de Los Ángeles (Our Lady of the Angels) in 1739 by José Antonio Manso de Velasco, it was originally a Spanish fort as an outpost in the War of Arauco. It received the title of villa in 1748. The city underwent numerous rebuildings, due to the Spanish military campaigns against the native Mapuche in their efforts to colonize the area. Its geographic location, just to the north of the Biobío river (the border established by the Spaniards), made it a strategic location.

In 1858, during the process of German immigration in Chile, Colonia Humán was founded, a town colonized by German settlers from Germany and Austro-Hungarian Empire and which was completely conurbated within the current urban limits of the city.

== Demographics ==
According to the 2024 census of the National Statistics Institute, Los Ángeles spans an area of 1,748.2 km^{2} (675 sq mi) and has 219,441 inhabitants (105,436 men and 114,005 women), with an average age of 37,6 years.

Within the communities of historical immigrants of the city of foreign origin, the Spanish, Arabs, Germans, and Swiss stand out, depending on their number and contributions, from the colonized localities by Europeans in the area, especially from Araucanía.

== Climate ==
This region experiences warm (but not hot) and dry summers, with no average monthly temperatures above 71.6 °F. According to the Köppen Climate Classification system, Los Ángeles has a warm-summer Mediterranean climate, abbreviated "Csb" on climate maps. Most of the annual precipitation of 42 inches (1070 mm) falls during the autumn and winter months of April through September. May is the wettest month, with 10 inches (250 mm) of precipitation on average. Snow is uncommon, and when it falls melts quickly.

Climate data for Los Ángeles
Month	Jan	Feb	Mar	Apr	May	Jun	Jul	Aug	Sep	Oct	Nov	Dec	Year
Mean daily maximum °C (°F)	29.0 (84.2)	27.8 (82.0)	24.7 (76.5)	20.2 (68.4)	15.2 (59.4)	12.5 (54.5)	12.6 (54.7)	13.5 (56.3)	16.7 (62.1)	19.8 (67.6)	22.8 (73.0)	26.6 (79.9)	20.1 (68.2)
Daily mean °C (°F)	20.6 (69.1)	19.4 (66.9)	16.7 (62.1)	13.5 (56.3)	10.7 (51.3)	8.6 (47.5)	8.2 (46.8)	8.6 (47.5)	10.8 (51.4)	13.3 (55.9)	15.0 (59.0)	18.6 (65.5)	13.7 (56.6)
Mean daily minimum °C (°F)	11.7 (53.1)	11.8 (53.2)	9.5 (49.1)	8.0 (46.4)	7.0 (44.6)	5.2 (41.4)	5.0 (41.0)	4.8 (40.6)	6.0 (42.8)	7.4 (45.3)	8.7 (47.7)	10.7 (51.3)	8.0 (46.4)
Average precipitation mm (inches)	22.3 (0.88)	28.5 (1.12)	51.3 (2.02)	81.7 (3.22)	234.3 (9.22)	252.4 (9.94)	211.2 (8.31)	181.4 (7.14)	104.9 (4.13)	58.4 (2.30)	52.3 (2.06)	31.8 (1.25)	1,310.5 (51.59)
Average relative humidity (%)	59	66	70	78	87	88	87	85	79	73	68	62	75
Source: Bioclimatografia de Chile

== Administration ==
As a commune, Los Ángeles is a third-level administrative division of Chile administered by a municipal council, headed by an alcalde who is directly elected every four years. The 2008-2012 alcalde is Joel Rosales Guzmán (UDI).

Within the electoral divisions of Chile, Los Ángeles is represented in the Chamber of Deputies by Juan Lobos (UDI) and José Pérez (PRSD) as part of the 47th electoral district, together with Tucapel, Antuco, Quilleco, Santa Bárbara, Quilaco, Mulchén, Negrete, Nacimiento, San Rosendo, Laja and Alto Bío Bío. The commune is represented in the Senate by Victor Pérez Varela (UDI) and Mariano Ruiz-Esquide Jara (PDC) as part of the 13th senatorial constituency (Biobío-Coast).

== Education ==
International schools

- Deutsche Schule Los Angeles
