= Parliament of Negrete (1793) =

1793 Spanish-Mapuche diplomatic meeting

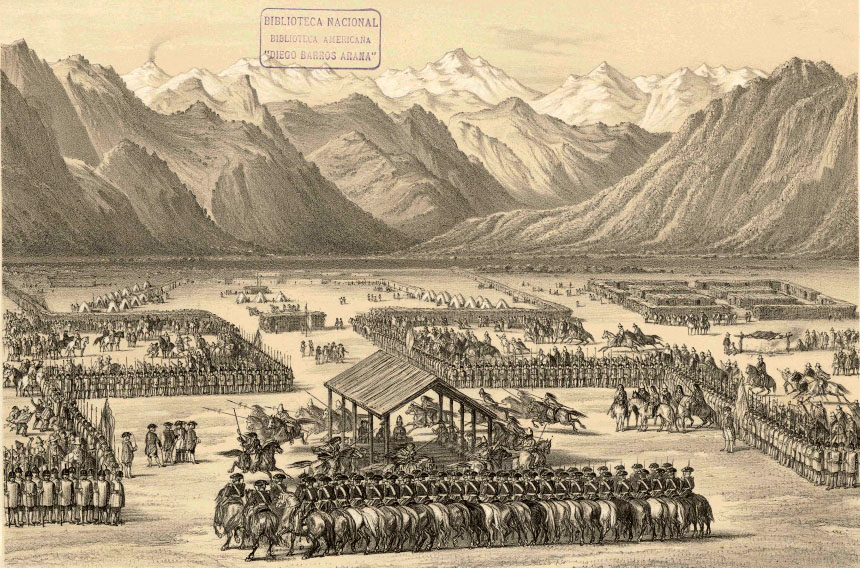
The 1793 parliament of Negrete according to Claudio Gay.

The 1793 Parliament of Negrete was a diplomatic meeting between Mapuches and Spanish authorities held in Negrete. The parliament was held from March 4 to March 6 of 1793. 161 caciques and 2380 Mapuche warriors attended the meeting.
