= Biobío Province =

Biobío Province Provincia de Biobío
- Province
- Seal

- Location in Biobío Region

- Location in Chile
- Coordinates: 37°23′S 71°52′W
- Country: Chile
- Region: Bio Bío
- Capital: Los Ángeles
- Communes: List of 14: Alto Bío Bío; Antuco; Cabrero; Laja; Los Ángeles; Mulchén; Nacimiento; Negrete; Quilaco; Quilleco; San Rosendo; Santa Bárbara; Tucapel; Yumbel

Government
  - Type: Provincial
  - Governor: Christán Fuentes Fuentes (PRI)

Area
  - Total: 14,987.9 km^{2} (5,786.9 sq mi)

Population (2012 Census)
  - Total: 373,981
  - Density: 24.9522/km^{2} (64.6259/sq mi)
  - Urban: 245,775
  - Rural: 107,540

Sex
  - Men: 176,960
  - Women: 176,355
- Time zone: UTC-4 (CLT)
  - Summer (DST): UTC-3 (CLST)
- Area code: 56 + 43
- Website: Government of Biobío

Biobío Province (Spanish: Provincia de Biobío [ˌbi.oˈβi.o]) is one of three provinces of the Chilean region of Biobío (VIII). Its capital is Los Ángeles (2002 pop. 94,716). It is bounded on the north, west and south by the provinces of Concepción, Arauco and Malleco, respectively, and on the east by Argentina. It has an area of 14,987.9 km^{2} (5,787 sq mi) of well-wooded and mountainous country, and exports timber to a large extent. The population is 373,981 according to the census of 2012.

The great trunk railway from Santiago south to Puerto Montt crosses the western part of the province and also connects it with the port of Concepción. Los Ángeles lies 25 km (16 mi) east of this railway and is connected with it by a branch line.

== History ==
The Province of Bio-Bío was created on October 13, 1875, as part of the province of Araucan. In 1887, President José Manuel Balmaceda set aside the Province of Malleco. The province was then named for the Biobío River which flows through it. The Province of Bio-Bío was divided, into three departments:

Department	Capital
La Laja	Los Ángeles
Mulchén	Mulchén
Nacimiento	Nacimiento

As part of the process of regionalization in the 1970s, the Region of Biobío was created. By Decree #1,213 of 27 of November 4, 1975, the VIII Region comprises the provinces of Bio Bío, Arauco and Concepción. Ñuble was formerly part of Biobío Province, before becoming its own region on the 5th of September 2018.

== Administration ==
As a province, Biobío is a second-level administrative division of Chile, governed by a provincial governor who is appointed by the president.

=== Communes ===
The province is composed of 14 communes, each governed by a municipality consisting of an elected alcalde and municipal council.

- Alto Bio Bío
- Antuco
- Cabrero
- Laja
- Los Ángeles (capital)
- Mulchén
- Nacimiento
- Negrete
- Quilaco
- Quilleco
- San Rosendo
- Santa Bárbara
- Tucapel
- Yumbel

== Geography and demography ==
According to the 2002 census by the National Statistics Institute (INE), the province spans an area of 14,987.9 km^{2} (5,787 sq mi) and had a population of 353,315 inhabitants (176,960 men and 176,355 women), giving it a population density of 23.6/km^{2} (61/sq mi). It is the tenth most populated province in the country. Of these, 245,775 (69.6%) lived in urban areas and 107,540 (30.4%) in rural areas. Between the 1992 and 2002 censuses, the population grew by 9.1% (29,405 persons).

== Bio Bío Valley wine region ==
The Bio Bío Valley wine region is located in the province and region of the same name. One of Chile's southern wine regions, it has become known for its crisp, aromatic wines. The region is located at a latitude of 36°S, similar to southern Spain and Monterey in California. The majority of its vineyards lie between 50 metres (160 ft) and 200 metres (660 ft) above sea level with a moderate Mediterranean climate. It receives 1,275 millimetres (50.2 in) of rain per year, among the highest of all Chilean wine valleys, although winds prevent excessive humidity - a phenomenon that can also be observed in northern France. For most of the 20th century, the main varieties grown in the Bio Bío valley were Moscatel de Alejandria and Pais (known as Missiones in USA), but today, Pinot Noir, Chardonnay, and Sauvignon Blanc are also grown throughout the valley.

The UK's Co-Op's Bio Bío Valley Malbec (2014) was awarded silver at the International Wine Challenge and a bronze from Decanter magazine.

=== Grape distribution by varietal ===
- Climate: moderate Mediterranean climate. 1,275 millimetres (50.2 in) of rain per year. Average rainfall is among highest seen in any Chilean wine valley, although winds prevent humidity.
- Soils: Alluvial soils, clay and sand.
- Primary grapes: Pinot noir, Chardonnay and Sauvignon blanc.

Cabernet Sauvignon: 145 hectares (360 acres)	Pinot Noir: 158 hectares (390 acres)	Moscatel de Alexandria: 142 hectares (350 acres)	Pais (Mission): 1,148 hectares (2,840 acres)

Total hectares planted: 446 hectares (1,100 acres)

== See also ==
- Chilean wine
