= Biobío Region =

Region of Chile

Biobío Region Región del Biobío
- Region of Chile
- Flag Seal Coat of arms

- Map of Biobío Region
- Coordinates: 36°50′S 73°03′W
- Country: Chile
- Capital: Concepción
- Provinces: Biobío, Concepción, Arauco

Government
  - Governor: Sergio Giacaman (Ind.)
  - Presidential delegate: Juan Pablo Mellado (acting)

Area
  - Total: 23,890.2 km^{2} (9,224.1 sq mi)
  - Rank: 10
- Lowest elevation: 0 m (0 ft)

Population (2017 census)
  - Total: 1,557,414
  - Rank: 3
  - Density: 65.1905/km^{2} (168.843/sq mi)

GDP (PPP)
  - Total: $26.428 billion (2014)
  - Per capita: $12,582 (2014)
- ISO 3166 code: CL-BI
- HDI (2022): 0.834 very high
- Website: Official website (in Spanish)

The Biobío Region (Spanish: Región del Biobío [ˌbi.oˈβi.o]) is one of Chile's sixteen regions (first-order administrative divisions). With a population of 1.5 million, thus being the third most populated region in Chile, it is divided into three provinces: Arauco, Biobío and Concepción. The latter contains its capital and largest city, Concepción, a major city and metro area in the country. Los Ángeles, capital of the Biobío Province, is another important city in the region.

== Geography ==
The Region of the Biobío is bordered on the west by the Pacific Ocean, on the east by Argentina, on the north by the Chilean Ñuble Region, and on the south by the Araucanía Region.

The Region has been hit by many Chilean earthquakes, including the most powerful earthquake ever recorded (in 1960) and the great earthquake of 2010. Many communities in the region were greatly affected by the earthquake of 2010 and the subsequent tsunami. That earthquake damaged Talcahuano and Dichato; the tsunami destroyed much of what remained of the port town.

== History ==
This is an inland valley between the cities of Concepción and Los Angeles, and it felt the greatest impact of the earthquake of 27 February 2010. The Department of Rere was a vital settlement area of Chileans and the three-hundred-year struggle (until the 1870s) to defeat the strong indigenous tribe of the Mapuches.

Chilean settlers of Spanish California from the present Region of the Bio Bío (especially from Concepción, Talcahuano, Los Angeles, Santa Barbara, and the Department of Rere) may have played a part in the establishment of Los Angeles and the rest of southern California in the period between 1775 and 1820.

Thousands of Chilean miners, ranchers, and shopkeepers from the Biobío Region are thought to have settled the coasts, mountains, and valleys of what became American California, both before and after the Mexican–American War, and to have helped create the cities of San Francisco, San Jose, Santa Barbara, and San Diego, California.

In November 2026, the Biobío region was chosen to host the 2030 South American Games.

== Demographics and cities ==
According to data from the 2017 census, the Region of the Biobío, with 2,018,803 inhabitants, is the second most populous region of Chile, after the Metropolitan Region of Santiago. In connection with the 1992 census, reflecting a total population of 1,734,305 inhabitants, there was a population growth of 7.3% in 10 years (1992–2002), the second lowest nationally, after the Region Magallanes and Chilean Antarctica. Taking into account their 37062.6 km^{2} in area, was in 2002, a density of 50.23 inhabitants per km^{2}, the third highest nationally.

The 2002 census showed an urban population of 1,528,306 inhabitants, corresponding to 82.1% of regional population and a rural population of 333,256 inhabitants, equivalent to 17.9% of the population of the region. Of the 1,861,562 inhabitants of the region of Biobío in 2002, 915,200 (49.16%) were men and 946,362 (50.84%) were women.

The metropolitan area of Concepción is one of the most populated conurbations in the country with a population of 979,937 inhabitants, corresponding to the sum of the population of the ten districts of Greater Concepción: Concepción (216,061 inhabitants) Talcahuano (250,348), Hualpén (88,046), San Pedro de la Paz (80,447) Chiguayante (81,302) Colonel (95,528) Lota (49,089) Penco (46,016) Tomé (52,440) and Hualqui (20,660).

Another of the most populated cities in the region are Chillán, with 165,528 inhabitants, is the tenth most populous urban area in the country, and is a conurbation with a portion of its population living in urban areas of the town of Chillán (146,701 inhabitants), and another that lives in the urban area of the town of Chillán Viejo (21,827 inhabitants), and Los Angeles, with its 166,556 inhabitants, is the eighteenth most populous urban area in the country.

With regard to the province of Biobío, in addition to Los Angeles, other major cities are: Mulchén with 21,819 inhabitants, Birth to 20,884 inhabitants, the conurbation La Laja-San Rosendo, with a total population of 19,537 inhabitants, with 11,947 inhabitants in Cabrero.

With regard to the province of Arauco, the most populated cities are: Curanilahue with 30,126 inhabitants, Lebu, the provincial capital, with 20,838 inhabitants, Canete with 19,839 inhabitants, Arauco with 16,291 inhabitants, and Los Alamos with 13,035 inhabitants.

With regard to membership or Indigenous Native Peoples, 52,918 people declared in the census of 2002 as Mapuche. This is 2.84% of the regional population and used the relationship Paternal = Female: Amerindian to determine the racial classification of persons identified as Mapuche.

=== Communes ===
The communes of the Biobío Region are:

Region	Province	Commune	Area (km^{2})	2002 Population	Website
Biobío (VIII)
	Arauco				
		Tirúa	624	9,664	link
		Los Álamos	599	18,632	link
		Lebu	561	25,035	link
		Curanilahue	994	31,943	link
		Contulmo	962	5,838	link
		Cañete	760	31,270	link
		Arauco	956	34,873	link
Biobío
		Yumbel	727	20,498	link
		Tucapel	915	12,777	link
		Santa Bárbara	3,380	19,970	link
		San Rosendo	92	3,918	link
		Quilleco	1,122	10,428	link
		Quilaco	1,124	4,021	link
		Negrete	157	8,579	link
		Nacimiento	935	25,971	link
		Mulchén	1,925	29,003	link
		Los Ángeles	1,748	166,556	link
		Laja	340	22,404	link
		Cabrero	640	25,282	link
		Antuco	1,884	3,908	link
		Alto Biobío	2,125	7,027	link
Concepción
		Tomé	495	52,440	link
		Talcahuano	146	250,348	link
		Santa Juana	731	12,713	link
		San Pedro de la Paz	113	80,447	link
		Penco	108	46,016	link
		Lota	136	49,089	link
		Hualqui	531	18,768	link
		Hualpén	54	86,722	link
		Florida	609	10,177	link
		Coronel	279	95,528	link
		Concepción	222	216,061	link
		Chiguayante	72	81,302	link

=== Ethnography ===
Along with Araucania, Ñuble, Maule and O'Higgins regions, Biobío's population is believed to be a remarkably homogeneous culture, but is of various ethnic and racial backgrounds. About 70% of inhabitants are of European origin, primarily of Spanish, German, French and other European communities. The mestizos make up 27% of the population and are the result of mixing between Europeans and Amerindians, while Amerindian population is 3%, mainly Mapuche. There is a romantic symbol of Chilenidad: huaso or cowboy/ shepherd "culture", typical of Chile.

Large numbers of Andalusians, Asturians, Basque, Galicians, Leonese, Murcian, Navarrans, and Valencians nationalities other than the "Castilian" Spanish established the nation and culture and gave the Spanish language to Chile.

Other waves of non-Spanish settlement of the region include Germans from Germany, Austria and Switzerland; French and Italians, whom contributed to the regional wine industry; British people, like English and Scottish, have densely settled Concepción on the coast; Dutch, Greek and Portuguese founded the oceanic fishing industry; Arab peoples like the Lebanese and Palestinians established several small businesses; and small scattering of U.S. Americans, Scandinavians and Eastern Europeans (mostly from the former Soviet Union, Czechoslovakia and Yugoslavia, especially Croats) established themselves in Chile as they fled political turmoil.

=== Religion ===
According to a 2002 census 58.63% of the inhabitants of the Biobío Region profess Catholicism, equivalent to 805,517 people, the third largest concentration of Catholics in a region in Chile, while the lowest percentage of Catholics corresponding to a region nationwide. 28.36% declare themselves as Protestant or Evangelical, equivalent to 389,632 people, the second largest concentration of Protestants in a region, while the highest percentage of Evangelicals corresponding to a region nationwide.

The province of Arauco is the only province to national level in which the number of Evangelicals, corresponding to 47.47% of the population, is greater than that of Catholics, corresponding to 36.33% of the population. It is a result of Protestant (Lutheran and Calvinist), Jehovah's Witnesses, Seventh-day Adventist and Mormon missionary work in Arauco during the 20th century.

Biobío tends to show a more culturally conservative attitude in contrast to the urban areas of Santiago/Valparaiso, which have a more liberal cosmopolitan position. It is more common for residents to attend church regularly, be it Catholic or Protestant.

== Economy ==
For decades, the characteristic feature of the Biobío Region has been its manufacturing industry, which contributes 35.6% of its GDP and operates mainly around the ports of Talcahuano, San Vicente, Lirquén, and Coronel, the greatest concentration of ports in Chile. The range of activities is broad, extending from iron and steel making to foodstuffs manufacture, petrochemicals, metalworking, oil refining, and shipyards.

The region's dynamism is also rooted in its large rivers. The important hydroelectric power complex on the Laja River is composed of the El Toro, Abanico, and Antuco power plants, and the Pangue and Ralco plants on the upper Biobío River. These facilities supply 26.6% of the energy used from Taltal in the north to Chiloé Archipelago 2,500 km (1,553 mi) to the south.

The region contains almost 44% of Chile's forest plantations, of which around 82% are radiata pine. It is the largest exporter of forestry products and supplies raw materials for pulp and paper plants, sawmills, and related activities.

The fishing industry is another dynamic sector. The region possesses 32% of the country's total fishing fleet, while approximately 50% of the national catch is unloaded at its ports. Moreover, this region alone is responsible for 4% of the world's catch of seafood. Main items include shellfish and conger eel, sardines, anchovy, mackerel, hake, mollusks, crustaceans, and algae.

High-quality fertile soils support a wide variety of crops, principally produce, grains, vegetables, artificial and improved pastures.

Animal husbandry focuses on production of beef, milk, and dairy products. Mining activity includes non-metallic minerals, principally quartz for the glass and steel industries.

== Notable sights ==
- Tumbes Peninsula
