= List of Christian democratic parties =

Christian democratic parties are political parties that seek to apply Christian principles to public policy. The underlying Christian democracy movement emerged in 19th-century Europe, largely under the influence of Catholic social teaching and Neo-Calvinist theology. Christian democracy continues to be influential in Europe and Latin America, though in a number of countries its Christian ethos has been diluted by secularisation. In practice, Christian democracy is often considered centre-right on cultural, social and moral issues, but centre-left "with respect to economic and labor issues, civil rights, and foreign policy" as well as the environment, (Note: The basic tenets of Christian democracy call for applying Christian principles to public policy; Christian democratic parties tend to be socially conservative but otherwise left of center with respect to economic and labor issues, civil rights, and foreign policy.) generally supporting a social market economy. Christian democracy can be seen as either conservative, centrist, or liberal / left of, right of, or center of the mainstream political parties depending on the social and political atmosphere of a given country and the positions held by individual Christian democratic parties. In Europe, where their opponents have traditionally been secularist socialists, Christian democratic parties are moderately conservative overall, whereas in the very different cultural and political environment of Latin America they tend to lean to the left. It is the dominant centre-right political movement in Europe, but by contrast, Christian democratic parties in Latin America tend to be left-leaning. Christian democracy includes elements common to several other political ideologies, including conservatism, liberalism, and social democracy. In the United States, Christian democratic parties of Europe and Latin America, deemed conservative and liberal respectively in their geopolitical regions, are both generally regarded as farther left-wing of the mainstream.

== Alphabetical list by country ==
=== A ===
Albania

- Albanian Christian Democratic Movement
- Christian Democratic Party of Albania

Argentina

- Christian Democratic Party

Armenia

- Christian-Democratic Rebirth Party
- Christian Democratic Union of Armenia
- National Christian Party

Aruba

- Aruban People's Party

Australia

- Christian Democratic Party
- Democratic Labour Party

Austria

- Austrian People's Party

=== B ===
Barbados

- People's Party for Democracy and Development

Belarus

- Belarusian Christian Democracy
- BPF Party

Belgium

- Christian Democratic and Flemish
- Christian Social Party
- ProDG
- Citizens' Movement for Change

Bolivia

- Christian Democratic Party

Bosnia and Herzegovina

- Croatian Democratic Union 1990
- Croatian Democratic Union of Bosnia and Herzegovina
- Croatian Christian Democrats

Brazil

- Christian Democracy

Bulgaria

- Union of Democratic Forces
- Christ Democratic Party of Bulgaria
- Reformist Bloc

Burundi

- Christian Democratic Party

=== C ===
Canada

- Christian Heritage Party of Canada

Cape Verde

- Movement for Democracy
- União Caboverdeana Independente e Democratica (Cape Verdean Union for an Independent Democracy) – UCID

Chile

- Christian Democratic Party

Colombia

- Christian National Party
- Christians for Community
- Christian Social Democratic Party

Costa Rica

- Christian Democratic Party
- Reform Party
- Social Christian Unity Party
- Social Christian Republican Party
- Christian Democratic Alliance

Croatia

- Croatian Democratic Union
- Homeland Movement
- Croatian Christian Democratic Party
- Croatian Sovereignists

Cuba

- Christian Democratic Party of Cuba
- Christian Liberation Movement

Curaçao

- National People's Party

Cyprus

- Democratic Rally

Czech Republic

- KDU-ČSL

=== D ===
Democratic Republic of the Congo

- Christian Democratic Party (Democratic Republic of the Congo)
- Convention of Christian Democrats
- Democratic Social Christian Party
- Federalist Christian Democracy – Convention of Federalists for Christian Democracy
- Movement for the Liberation of the Congo

Denmark

- Christian Democrats

Dominican Republic

- Christian Democratic Union
- Christian Democratic Party
- Social Christian Reformist Party

=== E ===
Ecuador

- Christian Democratic Party (Ecuador)
- Social Christian Party

Egypt

- Christian Democratic Party (Egypt), a Coptic party in Egypt founded in the 1950s.

El Salvador

- Christian Democratic Party

Estonia

- Pro Patria and Res Publica Union
- Party of Estonian Christian Democrats

European Union

- European Christian Political Party
- European People's Party

=== F ===
Faroe Islands

- Centre Party

Finland

- Christian Democrats

France

- The Republicans
- Christian Democratic Party

=== G ===
Georgia

- Christian-Democratic Movement
- Alliance of Patriots of Georgia

Germany

- Christian Democratic Union of Germany
- Christian Social Union in Bavaria
- Centre Party
- Family Party of Germany
- Alliance C – Christians for Germany

Gibraltar

- New Gibraltar Democracy

Greece

- Christian Democratic Party of the Overthrow
- New Democracy

=== H ===
Honduras

- Christian Democratic Party of Honduras

Hungary

- Christian Democratic People's Party

=== I ===
Ireland

- Fine Gael
- Fianna Fáil

Italy

- Forza Italia
- Popular Alternative
- Populars for Italy
- Solidary Democracy
- South Tyrolean People's Party
- Union of the Centre
- Us Moderates

=== K ===
Kosovo

- Albanian Christian Democratic Party of Kosovo

=== L ===
Liechtenstein

- Fatherland Union

Lithuania

- Lithuanian Christian Democracy Party
- Homeland Union – Lithuanian Christian Democrats
- Electoral Action of Poles in Lithuania
- Christian Union
- National Alliance

Lebanon

- Kataeb Party
- Lebanese Forces

Luxembourg

- Christian Social People's Party

=== M ===
Malta

- Nationalist Party

Mexico

- National Action Party

Moldova

- Christian-Democratic People's Party

=== N ===
Netherlands

- Alliance
- Christian Democratic Appeal
- Christian Union
- Farmer–Citizen Movement
- New Social Contract
- Jezus Leeft

Nicaragua

- Social Christian Party

North Macedonia

- VMRO–DPMNE
- VMRO – People's Party

Norway

- Christian People's Party

=== P ===
Panama

- People's Party

Papua New Guinea

- Christian Democratic Party

Paraguay

- Christian Democratic Party

Peru

- Christian People's Party
- Christian Democracy (DC)

Philippines

- Lakas–CMD (Lakas-Christian Muslim Democrats)
- Bangon Pilipinas Party
- Centrist Democratic Party of the Philippines
- Liberal Party (Philippines) (factions)

Poland

- Agreement
- Christian Democracy of the 3rd Polish Republic
- Civic Platform
- Law and Justice
- Polish People's Party

Portugal

- Democratic and Social Centre – People's Party

Puerto Rico

- Partido Acción Cristiana
- Proyecto Dignidad

=== R ===
Romania

- Christian-Democratic National Peasants' Party
- National Liberal Party
- Force of the Right
- People's Movement Party

Russia

- Christian Democratic Party of Russia

Rwanda

- Christian Democratic Party

=== S ===
Saint Lucia

- United Workers Party

San Marino

- Sammarinese Christian Democratic Party
- Union for the Republic

São Tomé and Príncipe

- Christian Democratic Front

Serbia

- Christian Democratic Party of Serbia
- Democratic Party of Serbia

Sint Maarten

- St. Maarten Christian Party

Slovakia

- Christian Democratic Movement

Slovenia

- New Slovenia – Christian Democrats
- Slovenian People's Party

South Africa

- African Christian Democratic Party
- Christian Democratic Party
- United Christian Democratic Party

Spain

- People's Party
- Basque Nationalist Party
- Democrats of Catalonia

Sweden

- Christian Democrats

Switzerland

- Christian Social Party of Obwalden
- Evangelical People's Party of Switzerland

=== T ===
Timor-Leste

- Christian Democratic Party
- Christian Democratic Union of Timor

=== U ===
Ukraine

- Batkivshchyna
- European Solidarity

United Kingdom

- Conservatives
- Christian Peoples Alliance

United States

- American Solidarity Party
- Prohibition Party

Uruguay

- National Party
- Christian Democratic Party of Uruguay

=== V ===
Venezuela

- Project Venezuela
- Political Electoral Independent Organization Committee (COPEI)
- National Convergence

== Other entities ==
- Global – Centrist Democrat International – headquartered in Brussels
- European Union – European People's Party – Centrist Democratic regional in Europe; and the largest group in European Parliament
  European Christian Political Party
- Americas – Christian Democrat Organization of America – Centrist Democratic regional in the Americas, North and South

=== Related philosophies ===
- Catholic social teaching
- Communitarianism
- Distributism
- Neo-Calvinism
- Social conservatism
- Social market economy
- Political Catholicism
- Christian politics
- Christian Zionism
- Liberal conservatism
- Abolitionism
- New World Order

=== Indices ===
- List of generic names of political parties
- List of political parties by country

== See also ==
- Christian left
- Christian right
- Communitarianism
