= List of rivers of the Bío Bío Region =

The information regarding List of rivers in the Bío-Bío Region on this page has been compiled from the data supplied by GeoNames. It includes all features named "Rio", "Canal", "Arroyo", "Estero" and those Feature Code is associated with a stream of water. (Note: The arbitrarily selected codes are RPDS, CHN, CNLA, CNLB, CNLD, CNLI, CNLN, CNLSB, CRKT, DTCH, DTCHI, DTCHD, ESTY, FORD, SBED, STM, STMA, STMB, STMC, STMD, STMH, STMI, STMIX, STMM, STMQ, STMS, STMSB, STMX, TNLC, WTRC, WTRH) This list contains 568 water streams.

== Content ==
This list contains:

1. Name of the stream, in Spanish Language
2. Coordinates are latitude and longitude of the feature in ± decimal degrees, at the mouth of the stream
3. Link to a map including the Geonameid (a number which uniquely identifies a Geoname feature)
4. Feature Code explained in
5. Other names for the same feature, if any
6. Basin countries additional to Chile, if any

== List ==
Rivers of the Bío Bío and Araucanía Regions

- Río Itata • 36.38746°S 72.8674°W • 3887026 • STM

- Río Lonquén • 36.43256°S 72.69027°W • 3882535 • STM
- Río Ñuble • 36.63675°S 72.47211°W • 3878470 • STM

- Río Changaral • 36.60005°S 72.3465°W • 3895470 • STM
- Río Chillán • 36.6033°S 72.33783°W • 3895084 • STM*
- Río Cato • 36.55243°S 72.08188°W • 3896150 • STM

- Río Niblinto • 36.58708°S 71.77909°W • 3878693 • STM

- Río Los Sauces • 36.67844°S 71.29136°W • 3881355 • STM

- Río Larqui • 36.689°S 72.44077°W • 3884692 • STM
- Río Diguillín • 36.8664°S 72.3799°W • 3892432 • STM

- Río del Renegado • 36.8714°S 71.65325°W • 3873443 • STM

- Estero Bureo • 36.57055°S 71.82737°W • 3897712 • STM • (Estero Bureo, Estero Bustamante)
- Río Andalién • 36.73843°S 73.00983°W • 3899674 • STM • (Rio Andalien, Río Andalién)
- Estero Coyanco • 36.73082°S 72.47099°W • 3893324 • STM
- Río Bío-Bío • 36.81667°S 73.16667°W • 3898379 • STM • (Rio Biobio, Río Biobío)

- Estero Quilacoya • 37.0498°S 72.96557°W • 3874265 • STM
- Río Laja • 37.26875°S 72.72159°W • 3885501 • STM • (Rio Laja, Rio de La Laja, Río Laja, Río de La Laja)

- Río Claro • 37.23266°S 72.64257°W • 3894566 • STM
- Río Rucúe • 37.3°S 71.95°W • 3872723 • STM
- Río Polcura • 37.33026°S 71.54914°W • 3875526 • STM

- Río Rele • 37.2789°S 72.73007°W • 3873516 • STM
- Río Huaqui • 37.37131°S 72.66762°W • 3887767 • STM • (Rio Guaque, Rio Guaqui, Rio Huaqui, Río Guaque, Río Guaqui, Río Huaqui)

- Río Rarinco • 37.39275°S 72.50385°W • 3873687 • STM

- Tavolevo River

- Río Culenco • 37.46769°S 72.73759°W • 3893050 • STM
- Río Nicodahue • 37.59582°S 72.83979°W • 3878688 • STM (also Araucania)

- Río La Esperanza • 37.59017°S 72.85242°W • 3885996 • STM (Araucania)
- Estero Maitenrehue • 37.59659°S 72.83443°W • 3880915 • STM • (Arroyo Maitenrehue, Estero Maitenrehue) (Araucania)

- Río Vergara • 37.49118°S 72.66716°W • 3868385 • STM (Araucania)

- Río Renaico • 37.6648°S 72.65033°W • 3873457 • STM

- Río Mininco • 37.67313°S 71.99511°W • 3879769 • STM

- Río Malleco • 37.7806°S 72.69741°W • 3880840 • STM • (Rio Malleco, Río Malleco) (Araucania)

- Río Huequén • 37.78694°S 72.68361°W • 3887625 • STM • (Rio Hueque, Rio Huequen, Río Hueque, Río Huequén) (Araucania)

- Río Rahue • 38.39776°S 71.24218°W • 3873851 • STM (Araucania)

- Río Picoiquén • 37.79975°S 72.70506°W • 3876204 • STM (Araucania)

- Río Bureo • 37.58039°S 72.50296°W • 3897711 • STM

- Río Mulchén • 37.7202°S 72.26028°W • 3879199 • STM

- Río Duqueco • 37.56685°S 72.49134°W • 3892136 • STM
- Estero Lirquén • 36.70833°S 72.975°W • 3965538 • STM
- Queuco River
- Río Lonquimay • 38.43502°S 71.23282°W • 3882532 • STM • (Rio Lonquimai, Rio Lonquimay, Río Lonquimai, Río Lonquimay) (Araucania)

- Riachuelo Colcura
- Estero Santa Rosa • 36.97359°S 72.32968°W • 3871390 • STM
- Río Laraquete • 37.16728°S 73.18355°W • 3884821 • STM
- Estero El Molino • 37.2428°S 73.10744°W • 3890979 • STM
- Estero Purgatorio • 37.34354°S 72.89689°W • 3874603 • STM
- Estero Los Timones • 37.35458°S 71.24019°W • 3881332 • STM
- Estero Lucanay • 37.38333°S 73.08333°W • 3881228 • STM
- Estero Las Cachañas • 37.38427°S 72.97498°W • 3884568 • STM
- Río Cabrera • 37.38932°S 73.2564°W • 3897566 • STM • (Estero Cabrera, Rio Cabrera, Rio Cabrere, Río Cabrera, Río Cabrere)
- Estero Cabrera • 37.39013°S 73.08036°W • 3897568 • STM
- Estero Las Chicharras • 37.39049°S 73.03086°W • 3884480 • STM
- Estero Cifuentes • 37.47477°S 73.15059°W • 3894645 • STM
- Río Pajillas • 37.51121°S 73.15567°W • 3877690 • STM
- Estero Pichipehuén • 37.55962°S 72.95586°W • 3876232 • STM
- Río Coihue • 37.62116°S 72.81054°W • 3894415 • STM
- Estero Coihueco • 37.63737°S 72.64565°W • 3894400 • STM
- Río Llay • 37.71667°S 71.28333°W • 3882925 • STM
- Río Caicupil • 37.82274°S 73.35486°W • 3897426 • STM • (Rio Caicupil, Rio Cayucupil, Río Caicupil, Río Cayucupil)
- Río Villucura • 38.12237°S 71.41437°W • 3868140 • STM
- Río Tirúa • 38.34303°S 73.50092°W • 3869760 • STM (also Araucania)
- Estero Pullay • 36.03314°S 72.77554°W • 3874873 • STM
- Río Buchupureo • 36.0785°S 72.79686°W • 3897848 • STM • (Estero Buchupureo, Rio Buchupureo, Río Buchupureo)
- Estero La Raya • 36.14303°S 72.50188°W • 3884816 • STM
- Río Cobquecura • 36.14337°S 72.80408°W • 3894524 • STM
- Río Taucu • 36.16586°S 72.80707°W • 3870083 • STM
- Río Colmuyao • 36.2377°S 72.81326°W • 3894163 • STM
- Estero Guairavo • 36.25707°S 72.37285°W • 3888576 • STM • (Estero Guairavo, Estero Guarinapo)
- Río Colomávida • 36.25707°S 72.37189°W • 3894149 • STM
- Estero Colliguay • 36.29311°S 71.88264°W • 3894194 • STM • (Estero Colliguay, Estero Colliquai, Estero Colliquay)
- Estero Monte Largo • 36.29344°S 71.88276°W • 3879441 • STM
- Estero Bulí • 36.30048°S 71.98013°W • 3897732 • STM
- Estero Coiquencillo • 36.32929°S 72.39528°W • 3894340 • STM • (Estero Coiquencillo, Estero Colquecillo)
- Estero Millauquén • 36.33539°S 72.03157°W • 3879870 • STM
- Estero Mela • 36.35857°S 72.85246°W • 3880128 • STM • (Estero Mela, Estero Meta)
- Estero Gaona • 36.36672°S 72.09241°W • 3889135 • STM
- Estero Torrecilla • 36.37621°S 72.33545°W • 3869520 • STM
- Estero Verguico • 36.38758°S 72.16712°W • 3868384 • STM
- Estero San Javier • 36.3922°S 72.10225°W • 3872151 • STM
- Estero Rayo • 36.39969°S 72.68195°W • 3873646 • STM
- Estero Rapú • 36.40528°S 72.73159°W • 3873706 • STM
- Río Santa Rosa • 36.41508°S 72.55182°W • 3871382 • STM
- Estero Quilpolemu • 36.42245°S 72.70536°W • 3874099 • STM
- Estero Uruque • 36.42564°S 72.35734°W • 3868764 • STM
- Estero San Carlos • 36.42691°S 72.0906°W • 3872319 • STM • (Estero Navotavo, Estero San Carlos)
- Estero Ñipas • 36.44073°S 72.62068°W • 3878614 • STM
- Estero Purema • 36.44433°S 72.88579°W • 3874613 • STM
- Estero Paniagua • 36.44975°S 72.61058°W • 3877343 • STM
- Estero La Merced • 36.45048°S 72.18999°W • 3885352 • STM
- Estero Agüita de los Leones • 36.45°S 72.88333°W • 3900365 • STM • (Estero Aguita de los Leones, Estero Agüita de los Leones, Estero Burea, Estero Bureo, Rio de Burea, Río de Burea) • (CL)
- Estero Rosario • 36.45409°S 72.04684°W • 3872815 • STM
- Estero Changaral • 36.45636°S 72.18722°W • 3895471 • STM • (Estero Changaral, Estero Coronta)
- Estero Lolco • 36.45641°S 72.18631°W • 3882671 • STM
- Estero Molino • 36.46418°S 72.5608°W • 3879603 • STM
- Estero Ablemos • 36.46697°S 72.18883°W • 3900751 • STM
- Estero Ninhue • 36.47111°S 72.44062°W • 3878628 • STM
- Estero Belbun • 36.47536°S 71.42642°W • 3898520 • STM
- Estero Cañas Dulce • 36.47904°S 72.58786°W • 3897013 • STM
- Estero Cipreses • 36.49677°S 71.41452°W • 3894615 • STM • (Cipreces, Estero Cipreses)
- Estero Torreón • 36.49707°S 72.21017°W • 3869505 • STM
- Estero Pingueral • 36.49779°S 72.90644°W • 3875914 • STM
- Estero Coronta • 36.49859°S 72.35366°W • 3893520 • STM • (Estero Coronta, Estero Corontas)
- Estero Ñinquihue • 36.50249°S 72.19502°W • 3878621 • STM • (Estero Ninquihue, Estero Niquihue, Estero Ñinquihue)
- Estero Las Piedras • 36.51873°S 71.60467°W • 3884022 • STM
- Estero Pangue • 36.51923°S 71.63644°W • 3877371 • STM • (Estero Pangue, Estero Panque)
- Estero Portezuelo • 36.52104°S 72.4908°W • 3875395 • STM
- Río Rafael • 36.52514°S 72.93164°W • 3873860 • STM • (Rio Lingueral, Rio Rafael, Río Lingueral, Río Rafael)
- Estero Caudal • 36.5282°S 72.53924°W • 3896124 • STM • (Estero Caudal, Rio Caudal, Rio Coudal, Río Caudal, Río Coudal)
- Estero Culenar • 36.5285°S 72.52036°W • 3893060 • STM
- Estero Pataguas • 36.53333°S 72.2°W • 3877023 • STM • (Estero Bulutao, Estero Patagua, Estero Pataguas) • (CL)
- Estero Cután • 36.54171°S 72.28129°W • 3892819 • STM • (Estero Cutan, Estero Cután, Estero Llequen, Estero Llequén)
- Estero Menelhue • 36.54322°S 72.19635°W • 3880054 • STM • (Estero Menelhue, Estero Menerenhue, Rio Menelhue, Río Menelhue)
- Estero Tragedia • 36.55815°S 71.1798°W • 3869390 • STM
- Estero Culenar • 36.56429°S 71.99166°W • 3893059 • STM
- Estero Bulileo • 36.56469°S 71.56088°W • 3897731 • STM
- Estero Coihueco • 36.56578°S 71.86623°W • 3894402 • STM
- Estero Papal • 36.57635°S 72.55928°W • 3877260 • STM
- Estero Coliumo • 36.60417°S 72.95417°W • 3965279 • STM
- Estero Bullilco • 36.60714°S 71.47997°W • 3897729 • STM
- Estero Los Guindos • 36.6077°S 71.49562°W • 3882025 • STM • (Estero Guindos, Estero Los Guindos, Quebrada Guindos)
- Estero Collén • 36.61667°S 72.9625°W • 3965287 • STM
- Estero Cuchacucha • 36.61715°S 72.39526°W • 3893182 • STM • (Estero Cucha, Estero Cuchacucha)
- Estero Lara • 36.62374°S 71.4384°W • 3884836 • STM
- Estero Las Toscas • 36.6304°S 72.16116°W • 3883848 • STMA
- Estero Bellavista • 36.63347°S 72.95656°W • 3898465 • STM
- Estero Quilmo • 36.64446°S 72.20478°W • 3874112 • STM
- Río Viejo • 36.64685°S 72.14492°W • 3868256 • STM
- Estero Boyén • 36.64979°S 72.09084°W • 3897981 • STM
- Estero Las Damas • 36.65268°S 71.39709°W • 3884395 • STM • (Estero Las Damas, Quebrada Damas)
- Estero Principal • 36.65539°S 71.38189°W • 3875168 • STM
- Estero Pincura • 36.6648°S 72.00484°W • 3875932 • STM
- Estero del Faro • 36.67604°S 71.19737°W • 3889576 • STM
- Estero Las Corrientes • 36.67766°S 71.3588°W • 3884443 • STM
- Río Santa Gertrudis • 36.67897°S 71.3623°W • 3871557 • STM
- Estero Palos Secos • 36.68936°S 71.18562°W • 3877522 • STM
- Estero San Ramón • 36.69768°S 72.4506°W • 3871731 • STM • (Estero Cayumanque, Estero Cayumanqui, Estero San Ramon, Estero San Ramón)
- Estero Lampato • 36.70056°S 72.32985°W • 3885267 • STM
- Estero Gallipavo • 36.70715°S 72.38301°W • 3889162 • STM
- Estero del Mogote • 36.70951°S 71.1951°W • 3879644 • STM
- Estero Pantanillo • 36.71003°S 71.99111°W • 3877301 • STM
- Estero Pichilluanco • 36.71019°S 71.99138°W • 3876247 • STM
- Río Gato • 36.72838°S 71.26572°W • 3889065 • STM
- Canal El Morro • 36.72953°S 73.10595°W • 3965333 • CNLN
- Estero El Salto • 36.73046°S 71.36565°W • 3890433 • STM
- Estero Penco • 36.73194°S 72.99167°W • 3965532 • STM
- Río Truchas • 36.73847°S 71.26395°W • 3869018 • STM
- Estero de Meco • 36.73965°S 72.1999°W • 3880243 • STM
- Estero de los Paños • 36.74101°S 71.41759°W • 3877322 • STM
- Estero Penco • 36.74167°S 72.99167°W • 3965349 • STM
- Estero Rabones • 36.7444°S 71.19392°W • 3873879 • STM
- Estero Cotrauco • 36.74747°S 72.05968°W • 3893356 • STM • (Estero Cotrauco, Estero Guanaco, Estero Guanco, Riachuelo Guauco)
- Estero Maule • 36.76074°S 72.19002°W • 3880309 • STM
- Estero Coltón • 36.76141°S 72.19035°W • 3893996 • STM
- Estero Espinal • 36.76193°S 72.3685°W • 3889821 • STM • (Estero Espinal, Estero Espiral)
- Estero Huemules • 36.76711°S 71.42149°W • 3887669 • STM
- Estero Horn • 36.76839°S 71.21795°W • 3887887 • STM
- Estero Quillón • 36.78562°S 72.48022°W • 3874121 • STM
- Estero Curapalihue • 36.7934°S 72.82129°W • 3892885 • STM • (Estero Curapalihue, Estero Dadi)
- Río Minas • 36.8119°S 71.25472°W • 3879809 • STM
- Estero San Luis • 36.81543°S 72.79736°W • 3871942 • STM
- Estero Tricao • 36.81787°S 72.01916°W • 3869116 • STM
- Estero Palpal • 36.82204°S 72.40284°W • 3877519 • STM
- Estero Claro • 36.83375°S 72.31877°W • 3894578 • STM
- Río Relbún • 36.86878°S 72.36969°W • 3873518 • STM
- Estero Temuco • 36.89076°S 72.02196°W • 3870010 • STM • (Estero Temuco, Riachuelo de Pemuco, Rio Pemuco)
- Estero Chelle • 36.8953°S 71.96762°W • 3895279 • STM
- Estero Las Raíces • 36.89572°S 71.96749°W • 3883957 • STM
- Estero Vertena • 36.90219°S 72.13095°W • 3868377 • STM
- Estero Danquilco • 36.90457°S 72.0188°W • 3892737 • STM
- Estero El Quemado • 36.90834°S 72.05451°W • 3890627 • STM • (Estero El Quemado, Estero Molino Quemado)
- Estero El Lobo • 36.91505°S 72.00304°W • 3891148 • STM
- Estero Río Seco • 36.91667°S 72.15°W • 3873103 • STM
- Estero Pilluco • 36.93674°S 72.1048°W • 3875976 • STM
- Río Palpal • 36.93725°S 72.10533°W • 3877518 • STM
- Estero Colicheo • 36.96608°S 72.34366°W • 3894281 • STM
- Estero Araucana • 36.97015°S 72.94956°W • 3899464 • STM • (Estero Araucana, Estero de La Araucana)
- Estero Pemuco • 36.98214°S 72.10118°W • 3876728 • STM
- Estero Culenco • 36.98919°S 72.23167°W • 3893051 • STM • (Estero Culenco, Rio Danicalqui)
- Estero Muqueral • 36.9959°S 72.70558°W • 3879160 • STM • (Estero Lircay, Estero Muqueral, Estero de Lircai)
- Río Boca del Maule • 36.99929°S 73.14027°W • 3898161 • STM • (Rio Boca Maule, Rio Boca del Maule, Río Boca Maule, Río Boca del Maule)
- Estero Tomeco • 37.00867°S 72.5527°W • 3869652 • STM
- Estero Nahuelcura • 37.01166°S 72.71969°W • 3879091 • STM
- Río Dañicalqui • 37.02723°S 72.19436°W • 3892744 • STM
- Estero Manco • 37.0419°S 73.14475°W • 3880728 • STM
- Estero Pachagua • 37.04572°S 72.52688°W • 3877835 • STM
- Estero El Toro • 37.05449°S 71.46208°W • 3890256 • STM
- Estero Ranchillos • 37.05484°S 72.298°W • 3873767 • STM
- Estero Pangal • 37.06244°S 72.51524°W • 3877395 • STM
- Estero Guindos • 37.06326°S 72.29537°W • 3888258 • STM
- Estero Sauzal • 37.0646°S 72.28201°W • 3871177 • STM
- Estero Las Diucas • 37.06826°S 72.88182°W • 3884388 • STM
- Estero Perdices • 37.06841°S 71.36706°W • 3876532 • STM • (Arroyo de las Perdices, Estero Perdices)
- Estero los Peucos • 37.07167°S 71.39799°W • 3876388 • STM
- Estero Quinquihueno • 37.07257°S 72.75523°W • 3874008 • STM
- Estero las Águilas • 37.07271°S 71.35896°W • 3900375 • STM
- Estero Las Nieves • 37.07315°S 72.61236°W • 3884131 • STM • (Estero Las Nieve, Estero Las Nieves)
- Estero Caracoles • 37.07656°S 71.35545°W • 3896783 • STM
- Estero Nininco • 37.07684°S 72.77638°W • 3878626 • STM
- Estero Pileo • 37.0793°S 72.99126°W • 3876006 • STM
- Estero Colliguay • 37.08064°S 72.93843°W • 3894192 • STM
- Estero Bermejo • 37.08333°S 72.56667°W • 3898423 • STM
- Río Coihue • 37.08367°S 72.10775°W • 3894416 • STM
- Estero Ratones • 37.08495°S 71.32146°W • 3873671 • STM
- Estero Monte Águila • 37.08703°S 72.48499°W • 3879475 • STM
- Estero de los Sapos • 37.08749°S 72.5147°W • 3871271 • STM
- Estero Blanquillo • 37.08996°S 71.41007°W • 3898183 • STM • (Arroyo Blanquillo, Estero Blanquillo)
- Estero La Langosta • 37.0928°S 71.20924°W • 3885495 • STMI
- Estero Catalinas • 37.09337°S 71.44409°W • 3896183 • STM
- Estero Colliguay • 37.09771°S 72.53218°W • 3894193 • STM • (Estero Colliguai, Estero Colliguay)
- Río Quinquebueno • 37.10054°S 72.7756°W • 3874012 • STM
- Río Trilaleo • 37.10332°S 72.12381°W • 3869093 • STM • (Estero Trilaleo, Rio Trilaleo, Río Trilaleo)
- Estero Quemazones • 37.10438°S 71.22939°W • 3874392 • STM
- Río Chanco • 37.10572°S 72.95172°W • 3895482 • STM
- Estero Avellanos • 37.1075°S 71.73856°W • 3899098 • STM
- Estero Molino • 37.11161°S 72.98772°W • 3879602 • STM • (Arroyo de Molino, Estero Molino)
- Estero Burriqueces • 37.11186°S 71.77265°W • 3897694 • STM • (Estero Burriqueces, Estero Burriquetes)
- Estero San José • 37.11199°S 72.09162°W • 3872092 • STM
- Estero Mulas • 37.11279°S 71.76127°W • 3879211 • STM
- Estero Panqueco • 37.11558°S 72.02089°W • 3877318 • STM
- Estero Barrán • 37.12144°S 71.74208°W • 3898742 • STM
- Estero Tapihue • 37.12176°S 72.54483°W • 3870136 • STM
- Estero Yumbel • 37.12636°S 72.55715°W • 3867623 • STM
- Estero Agua Cascada • 37.12902°S 73.12584°W • 3900569 • STM
- Estero Infiernillo • 37.13104°S 71.64902°W • 3887209 • STM
- Estero Peruco • 37.13356°S 71.64694°W • 3876460 • STM
- Río Rere • 37.13719°S 72.76363°W • 3873411 • STM
- Estero Trilaleo • 37.1°S 72.01667°W • 3869094 • STM
- Estero Los Palos • 37.1°S 71.23333°W • 3881645 • STM
- Río Chivilingo • 37.14138°S 73.17115°W • 3894924 • STM • (Rio Chihuilleco, Rio Chivilingo, Río Chivilingo)
- Estero Villagrán • 37.14471°S 71.67654°W • 3868181 • STM • (Estero Burriqueces, Estero Villagran, Estero Villagrán)
- Río Itatita • 37.15°S 72.03333°W • 3887023 • STM
- Estero Ñipilco • 37.15582°S 72.0516°W • 3878613 • STM
- Estero Moya • 37.16253°S 72.97757°W • 3879241 • STM
- Río del Molino • 37.1633°S 73.18964°W • 3879591 • STM
- Río Cholguán • 37.16552°S 72.03502°W • 3894886 • STM
- Río Huépil • 37.16573°S 72.0354°W • 3887635 • STM
- Estero Huecó • 37.16797°S 72.90202°W • 3887729 • STM
- Estero Lajitas • 37.17056°S 72.00269°W • 3885556 • STM
- Estero Atravesado • 37.17644°S 71.4433°W • 3899163 • STM
- Estero Raquecura • 37.17729°S 72.92465°W • 3873705 • STM
- Río Grande • 37.18333°S 72.81667°W • 3888779 • STM
- Estero Copinco • 37.1873°S 72.87975°W • 3893645 • STM
- Estero Chillancito • 37.18883°S 71.97668°W • 3895081 • STM
- Estero Turra • 37.19038°S 72.72818°W • 3868864 • STM
- Estero Colchagua • 37.19191°S 72.759°W • 3894313 • STM
- Estero Llico • 37.19251°S 73.56684°W • 3882896 • STMI
- Estero San Cristóbal • 37.19315°S 72.61305°W • 3872301 • STM
- Río Reñico • 37.19315°S 71.98751°W • 3873436 • STM
- Río Gomero • 37.19381°S 72.82166°W • 3888938 • STM
- Estero San Cristóbal • 37.19546°S 72.66312°W • 3872300 • STM
- Estero Llahuilo • 37.20486°S 72.61728°W • 3883041 • STM • (Estero Llahuilo, Estero Llambilo)
- Estero Curamávida • 37.2067°S 72.78361°W • 3892901 • STM
- Estero Polvareda • 37.21337°S 72.43667°W • 3875481 • STM
- Estero Tricauco • 37.21733°S 72.63457°W • 3869108 • STM
- Estero Buenuraqui • 37.22053°S 72.7507°W • 3897793 • STM
- Estero Chilcoco • 37.22346°S 73.55352°W • 3895124 • STM
- Estero La Potreada • 37.23208°S 72.5521°W • 3884930 • STM
- Río Carampangue • 37.23402°S 73.2862°W • 3896766 • STM
- Río Tubul • 37.23487°S 73.44215°W • 3868990 • STM
- Estero Luanco • 37.23545°S 72.30804°W • 3881232 • STM
- Río Raqui • 37.23686°S 73.43929°W • 3873698 • STM
- Estero Llollinco • 37.23833°S 72.63325°W • 3882846 • STM
- Estero Ortiz • 37.23924°S 73.03851°W • 3877970 • STM
- Estero Las Perras • 37.24184°S 71.90088°W • 3884031 • STM
- Estero Pichiluanco • 37.24188°S 72.19322°W • 3876243 • STM
- Estero Catalina • 37.24244°S 72.19286°W • 3896191 • STM
- Estero Catalina • 37.24287°S 72.23962°W • 3896190 • STM
- Estero Agua Pie • 37.24497°S 73.54684°W • 3900452 • STM • (Arroyo Agua Pie, Arroyo Agua Pié, Estero Agua Pie)
- Estero Riñico • 37.24557°S 71.81468°W • 3873164 • STM
- Río de Caliboro • 37.24562°S 72.50297°W • 3897278 • STM • (Estero Cariboro, Rio Calri, Rio de Caliboro, Río de Caliboro)
- Estero Tricao • 37.24893°S 72.69418°W • 3869115 • STM
- Estero Los Rucos • 37.25067°S 71.23438°W • 3881382 • STM
- Estero Agua Fría • 37.2564°S 72.29733°W • 3900481 • STM
- Río Macho • 37.25977°S 71.68707°W • 3881088 • STM
- Estero Desagüe • 37.26356°S 72.8207°W • 3892637 • STM
- Estero Trehuaco • 37.26487°S 73.54991°W • 3869249 • STM
- Estero La Vieja • 37.26521°S 72.28086°W • 3883539 • STM
- Río Lía • 37.26859°S 73.19388°W • 3883288 • STM • (Rio Elias, Rio Lia, Río Elias, Río Lía)
- Estero Blanco • 37.26879°S 71.46056°W • 3898241 • STM
- Río Conumo • 37.26884°S 73.25139°W • 3893689 • STM • (Rio Conumo, Rio Conumu, Río Conumo, Río Conumu)
- Río Pichilo • 37.26938°S 73.19378°W • 3876245 • STM
- Estero Las Chilcas • 37.27103°S 73.15312°W • 3884472 • STM
- Estero Los Caracoles • 37.27355°S 71.55241°W • 3882274 • STM
- Estero Quiques • 37.27579°S 73.15559°W • 3873960 • STM
- Estero Pichitropen • 37.28915°S 73.66022°W • 3876218 • STMI
- Estero Paso Hondo • 37.28919°S 72.83288°W • 3877091 • STM
- Estero Centinela • 37.29068°S 71.73571°W • 3895968 • STM
- Estero Colico • 37.29°S 72.83382°W • 3894276 • STM
- Río Pitraleo • 37.29598°S 73.26302°W • 3875753 • STM
- Estero El Indio • 37.29929°S 71.66295°W • 3891238 • STM
- Estero Caripilún • 37.30232°S 73.47392°W • 3896655 • STM
- Río los Patos • 37.30419°S 73.30699°W • 3876978 • STM
- Estero Nahuel • 37.31081°S 73.36846°W • 3879099 • STM
- Estero Malloga • 37.3121°S 73.25956°W • 3880824 • STM • (Estero Malloga, Estero Moyoga)
- Estero Chacay • 37.31225°S 72.9283°W • 3895755 • STM
- Estero Menural • 37.31627°S 73.36952°W • 3880040 • STM
- Río Chanco • 37.31667°S 71.83333°W • 3895481 • STM
- Río Alborrada • 37.31766°S 73.36954°W • 3900260 • STM • (Estero Alborrada, Rio Alborrada, Río Alborrada)
- Estero Pichipolcura • 37.32136°S 71.5723°W • 3876226 • STM
- Río Quillaylebu • 37.32445°S 71.61262°W • 3874144 • STM
- Estero El Toro • 37.33056°S 71.54858°W • 3890255 • STM
- Estero El Manco • 37.33056°S 71.87776°W • 3891103 • STM
- Estero Huitanco • 37.33087°S 73.22882°W • 3887475 • STM
- Estero Morera • 37.33562°S 72.70338°W • 3879339 • STM
- Estero Centinela • 37.33813°S 73.25113°W • 3895967 • STM
- Estero Sirena Grande • 37.34158°S 73.25088°W • 3870822 • STM
- Estero Curañadú • 37.34746°S 72.35906°W • 3892897 • STM • (Arroyo Curanadu, Arroyo Curanadú, Estero Curanadu, Estero Curañadú, Rio Curanadu, Rio Curañadú)
- Estero Los Cipreses • 37.34882°S 71.52999°W • 3882196 • STM
- Río Bulelco • 37.35043°S 73.44668°W • 3897734 • STM
- Estero Macal • 37.35124°S 73.24255°W • 3881124 • STM
- Río El Molino • 37.35128°S 73.44621°W • 3890969 • STM • (Estero El Molino, Rio El Molino, Río El Molino)
- Arroyo Patahuecó • 37.35156°S 72.15314°W • 3877018 • STM
- Estero del Arco • 37.35373°S 72.84785°W • 3899417 • STM
- Estero Chacay • 37.35652°S 72.84238°W • 3895754 • STM • (Arroyo Chacai, Estero Chacay)
- Estero Malalcura • 37.35986°S 71.50623°W • 3880876 • STM
- Estero Chuchuico • 37.36094°S 72.69772°W • 3894785 • STM
- Río Paillacahue • 37.36306°S 73.60634°W • 3877746 • STMI
- Estero Chillico • 37.3638°S 72.63589°W • 3895074 • STM
- Río Colorado • 37.36667°S 73.45°W • 3894029 • STM
- Estero Polcura • 37.36769°S 73.0866°W • 3875532 • STM
- Estero Claro • 37.36804°S 73.08777°W • 3894577 • STM
- Estero San Jerónimo • 37.36955°S 72.83824°W • 3872144 • STM
- Estero Loncopan • 37.3699°S 71.86736°W • 3882576 • STM
- Estero de los Coligües • 37.36995°S 72.78767°W • 3894257 • STM
- Estero Los Sótanos • 37.37828°S 72.95898°W • 3881351 • STM
- Estero El Espigado • 37.37943°S 72.94655°W • 3891385 • STM
- Estero Paso Ancho • 37.37957°S 72.77446°W • 3877102 • STM
- Río Quidico • 37.38139°S 73.62782°W • 3874288 • STMI
- Estero Los Huinganes • 37.38208°S 71.7028°W • 3881996 • STM • (Estero Huinganes, Estero Los Huinganes)
- Estero Los Canelos • 37.38328°S 72.01663°W • 3882283 • STM
- Río Trubunleo • 37.38333°S 71.46667°W • 3869021 • STM
- Estero El Toro • 37.38333°S 71.4°W • 3890254 • STM
- Estero Las Heras • 37.38347°S 72.10177°W • 3884331 • STM
- Estero Los Borrachos • 37.38406°S 72.04617°W • 3882334 • STM
- Estero Humenco • 37.38422°S 72.10226°W • 3887450 • STM
- Estero Agua Fría • 37.38487°S 72.05986°W • 3900480 • STM
- Estero Desagüe • 37.38551°S 72.59173°W • 3892636 • STM
- Estero Las Quemas • 37.38957°S 73.08077°W • 3883975 • STM
- Estero Villuco • 37.38974°S 72.51559°W • 3868144 • STM
- Estero Quilque • 37.39685°S 72.52943°W • 3874092 • STM
- Estero Las Ánimas • 37.4027°S 71.87522°W • 3884642 • STM
- Estero Cullileo • 37.40724°S 72.79863°W • 3893034 • STM • (Arroyo Collileo, Estero Cullileo, Rio Collileo, Río Collileo)
- Estero Lipelipe • 37.40793°S 73.55346°W • 3883119 • STM
- Estero Mundo Nuevo • 37.41013°S 73.20587°W • 3879183 • STM
- Estero Colico • 37.41436°S 73.38354°W • 3894275 • STM
- Estero Diuto • 37.41734°S 72.31968°W • 3892382 • STM • (Estero Diuto, Estero Duilo, Estero Duito, Rio Diuto, Río Diuto)
- Estero Los Radales • 37.41802°S 71.62008°W • 3881435 • STM
- Estero Los Chuchos • 37.42174°S 71.61656°W • 3882203 • STM
- Estero Arinco • 37.42484°S 72.7815°W • 3899354 • STM
- Estero Los Notros • 37.42523°S 72.86959°W • 3881679 • STM
- Estero Elgueta • 37.42625°S 71.90345°W • 3891288 • STM
- Estero Las Rosas • 37.42698°S 73.51896°W • 3883923 • STM
- Río Huillinco • 37.4273°S 73.51849°W • 3887528 • STM • (Estero Huillinco, Rio Huillinco, Río Huillinco)
- Río Quiapo • 37.43902°S 73.59713°W • 3874303 • STM • (Rio Quiapo, Río Quiapo)
- Estero Locobe • 37.43925°S 73.59263°W • 3882724 • STM • (Arroyo Locobe, Estero Locobe)
- Estero La Chupalla • 37.44733°S 73.39752°W • 3886251 • STM • (Estero Chupalla, Estero La Chupalla)
- Estero Anguillas • 37.44758°S 73.55494°W • 3899594 • STM
- Canal del Laja • 37.45146°S 72.10085°W • 3885571 • DTCH
- Estero Echeverría • 37.46132°S 71.55022°W • 3892082 • STM
- Estero del Volcán • 37.46667°S 71.31667°W • 3867970 • STM
- Estero Ramadillas • 37.46667°S 71.8°W • 3873805 • STM
- Río Taboleo • 37.46928°S 72.68594°W • 3870372 • STM
- Estero El Bolsón • 37.4729°S 72.418°W • 3891854 • STM
- Estero Maipo • 37.47354°S 72.41782°W • 3880986 • STM
- Estero Ánimas • 37.47372°S 73.15033°W • 3899577 • STM • (Estero Animas, Estero Ánimas, Rio Animas, Río Animas)
- Estero Plegarias • 37.4768°S 73.35077°W • 3875629 • STM
- Estero Cañileo • 37.48008°S 71.80425°W • 3896907 • STM
- Río Ranas • 37.48244°S 73.33421°W • 3873776 • STM
- Estero Petronquines • 37.48333°S 71.26667°W • 3876400 • STM • (Estero Petronpuines, Estero Petronquines) • (CL)
- Río del Pino • 37.48803°S 71.26728°W • 3875909 • STM
- Estero Paso Hondo • 37.49059°S 73.42803°W • 3877090 • STM • (Estero Paso Honda, Estero Paso Hondo)
- Estero Pichicoreo • 37.49354°S 72.08286°W • 3876283 • STM
- Estero Pantanillos • 37.49863°S 71.95282°W • 3877295 • STM
- Río Negro • 37.50029°S 73.31462°W • 3878784 • STM
- Río Descabezado • 37.50096°S 73.3174°W • 3892626 • STM
- Estero Coihue • 37.50229°S 72.78566°W • 3894420 • STM
- Estero Ríopardo • 37.50535°S 72.09788°W • 3873110 • STM
- Estero Cantarrana • 37.50586°S 71.99292°W • 3896880 • STM
- Estero Caillihue • 37.50713°S 72.56825°W • 3897416 • STM
- Estero Las Aguadas • 37.50914°S 73.44088°W • 3884672 • STM
- Estero Coihueco • 37.51038°S 71.99137°W • 3894401 • STM
- Estero Paillihue • 37.5127°S 72.42306°W • 3877741 • STM
- Estero Panqueco • 37.51349°S 72.42167°W • 3877317 • STM
- Estero Guallaco • 37.51667°S 73.6°W • 3888546 • STM
- Estero Quilaco • 37.51722°S 71.9895°W • 3874271 • STM
- Río Maipo • 37.51772°S 73.04333°W • 3880982 • STM • (Estero Maipo, Rio Maipo, Río Maipo)
- Estero Coyanco • 37.51909°S 72.59636°W • 3893323 • STM
- Estero Cañicura • 37.52073°S 71.8681°W • 3896910 • STM
- Estero Pichicollahue • 37.52399°S 71.22236°W • 3876287 • STM
- Estero Potrero de las Yeguas • 37.52433°S 71.23154°W • 3875283 • STM
- Estero Mampil • 37.52658°S 71.71965°W • 3880775 • STM • (Estero Mampil, Estero Manpil)
- Estero Los Padres • 37.52766°S 71.68848°W • 3881665 • STM
- Río Ránquil • 37.52845°S 73.59621°W • 3873738 • STM
- Estero Campamento • 37.53127°S 71.21804°W • 3897125 • STM
- Estero Rocacura • 37.53245°S 71.59739°W • 3872993 • STM • (El Rocacura, Estero Rocacura)
- Estero El Rodado • 37.5327°S 71.59667°W • 3890527 • STM
- Estero Quilleco • 37.53659°S 71.98829°W • 3874140 • STM
- Estero Nancagua • 37.53759°S 72.33339°W • 3879059 • STM
- Estero La Castellana • 37.53869°S 71.6388°W • 3886310 • STM
- Estero Correntoso • 37.5°S 71.26667°W • 3893461 • STM
- Estero Lipín • 37.53948°S 71.83948°W • 3883114 • STM
- Estero Agua Grande • 37.5399°S 71.83932°W • 3900468 • STM
- Estero Cholguahue • 37.54177°S 72.31099°W • 3894888 • STM • (Estero Cholguahue, Estero Cholhuahue)
- Estero de Choroico • 37.54191°S 72.82871°W • 3894855 • STM • (Arroyo Choroico, Estero de Choroico)
- Estero de Trapa Trapa • 37.54216°S 71.2112°W • 3869295 • STM
- Estero El Boqui • 37.54217°S 71.57764°W • 3891846 • STM
- Estero El Valiente • 37.54235°S 71.57353°W • 3890197 • STM
- Estero Bataco • 37.54242°S 71.58546°W • 3898614 • STM
- Estero Paulin • 37.54244°S 71.64851°W • 3876961 • STM
- Estero Renegado • 37.54542°S 71.56643°W • 3873444 • STM
- Estero Dimilhue • 37.5465°S 71.8659°W • 3892428 • STM
- Estero Pichicholguahue • 37.55069°S 72.28414°W • 3876297 • STM
- Río Trongol • 37.55253°S 73.44555°W • 3869043 • STM
- Río Nahue • 37.55792°S 73.13862°W • 3879101 • STM
- Río Chirihuillin • 37.55805°S 73.46108°W • 3894971 • STM
- Estero Nieves • 37.56226°S 72.97337°W • 3878667 • STM
- Río Coreo • 37.56288°S 72.24593°W • 3893565 • STM • (Estero Coreo, Rio Coreo, Río Coreo)
- Estero Los Pinos • 37.56323°S 73.36287°W • 3881546 • STM
- Estero Llenquereo • 37.56366°S 71.52308°W • 3882916 • STM
- Río Aillín • 37.56667°S 71.5°W • 3900344 • STM
- Río Curanilahue • 37.57092°S 73.45476°W • 3892889 • STM
- Estero Bulleco • 37.57101°S 73.61636°W • 3897730 • STM • (Estero Bolaca, Estero Bolleco, Estero Bulleco)
- Estero Arilahuén • 37.57261°S 72.08294°W • 3899355 • STM
- Estero Curiche • 37.58119°S 72.14847°W • 3892871 • STM
- Estero Primera Agua • 37.58333°S 73.31667°W • 3875176 • STM
- Arroyo Quirquincho • 37.58687°S 72.18825°W • 3873947 • STM
- Estero Pozuelos • 37.58937°S 72.63628°W • 3875215 • STM
- Estero Calabozo • 37.58959°S 72.85193°W • 3897364 • STM • (Arroyo Calabazo, Estero Calabozo)
- Estero Pemuco • 37.59183°S 72.16125°W • 3876727 • STM
- Río Lebu • 37.59796°S 73.66253°W • 3883455 • STM • (Rio Cupano, Rio Cupanu, Rio Cupaño, Rio Lebu, Río Cupañu, Río Lebu)

- Riachuelo Quilañanco
- Riachuelo Curihuillín
- Estero Curanilahue • 38.03253°S 73.46209°W • 3892891 • STM • (Estero Curanilahue, Estero Curanilhue, Rio Curanilahue, Río Curanilahue)
- Río Pilpilco • 37.57158°S 73.45402°W • 3875954 • STM

- Estero Curicó • 37.59918°S 73.58099°W • 3892869 • STM
- Estero Pelehue • 37.60949°S 72.46105°W • 3876781 • STM
- Estero Meñir • 37.61399°S 72.75129°W • 3880051 • STM
- Río Fortuna • 37.61943°S 73.34752°W • 3889381 • STM
- Estero Liñeco • 37.62081°S 72.65447°W • 3883141 • STM
- Estero Cañicura • 37.62972°S 71.66065°W • 3896909 • STM
- Estero de Malven • 37.63334°S 72.42329°W • 3880792 • STM
- Estero Chumulco • 37.63366°S 72.40891°W • 3894725 • STM
- Estero Junquillos • 37.63502°S 72.3426°W • 3886689 • STM
- Estero Ullinco • 37.63518°S 72.64905°W • 3868835 • STM
- Estero Los Laureles • 37.63917°S 72.06456°W • 3881964 • STM
- Estero Calbuco • 37.64464°S 72.36544°W • 3897332 • STM • (Estero Calbuco)
- Estero Licura • 37.64567°S 72.31302°W • 3883255 • STM
- Estero Pile • 37.66441°S 72.15614°W • 3876010 • STM
- Estero Cullinco • 37.6699°S 73.44696°W • 3893028 • STM
- Estero Las Diucas • 37.67619°S 72.29133°W • 3884387 • STM
- Estero Lirquén • 37.67886°S 71.9947°W • 3883091 • STM
- Estero Lirquén • 37.68333°S 71.96667°W • 3883092 • STM
- Río Cura Mallín • 37.68333°S 71.31667°W • 3892905 • STM • (Estero Infiernillo, Rio Cura Mallin, Rio Curi Maullin, Río Cura Mallín, Río Curi Maullín) • (CL)
- Río Pichicaramávida • 37.69316°S 73.36449°W • 3876302 • STM
- Estero Chimpel • 37.6973°S 73.64916°W • 3895051 • STM
- Estero Micauquen • 37.69847°S 72.47409°W • 3879937 • STM • (Estero Micauquen, Estero Nicauquen)
- Estero Raquilca • 37.70183°S 72.35023°W • 3873697 • STM
- Estero Quilapalo • 37.7045°S 71.9664°W • 3874240 • STM
- Estero Ñanco • 37.71014°S 72.08619°W • 3879056 • STM
- Río Curaco • 37.71049°S 73.65318°W • 3892917 • STM • (Estero Curaco, Rio Curaco, Río Curaco)
- Río Quilmo • 37.7149°S 71.8823°W • 3874110 • STM
- Estero Triunquilemu • 37.71754°S 72.26556°W • 3869069 • STM
- Río Pilunchaya • 37.72791°S 71.22611°W • 3875947 • STM
- Estero Catribolí • 37.73011°S 73.57942°W • 3896143 • STM
- Río Manquecuel • 37.73225°S 72.22012°W • 3880687 • STM • (Estero Manquecuel, Rio Manquecuel, Río Manquecuel)
- Estero Reñaca • 37.73255°S 72.20204°W • 3873463 • STM
- Estero Nihuinco • 37.73482°S 72.15914°W • 3878657 • STM
- Estero Chupalla • 37.73648°S 73.37548°W • 3894702 • STM
- Estero Puelón • 37.7°S 71.36667°W • 3875029 • STM
- Estero Niremetún • 37.7°S 71.41667°W • 3878602 • STM
- Río Mininco • 37.7°S 71.81667°W • 3879768 • STM • (Estero Mininco, Rio Huequecura, Rio Mininco, Río Huequecura, Río Mininco) • (CL)
- Estero Mondungo • 37.73886°S 72.33178°W • 3879516 • STM
- Estero Cañicú • 37.7°S 71.48333°W • 3896912 • STM
- Estero Cachidivoill • 37.7°S 71.4°W • 3897518 • STM
- Estero Pichillenquehue • 37.74263°S 73.45287°W • 3876250 • STM
- Estero Agua Blanca • 37.74336°S 71.52178°W • 3900585 • STM
- Estero Quinahue • 37.7471°S 73.6341°W • 3874056 • STM
- Estero Azul • 37.75008°S 71.52989°W • 3899035 • STM
- Estero Rehuén • 37.75082°S 72.24009°W • 3873537 • STM
- Estero Monte Loma • 37.76163°S 72.32385°W • 3879439 • STM
- Estero Pilquén • 37.76667°S 72.18333°W • 3875950 • STM
- Estero Pitril Norte • 37.76676°S 71.53391°W • 3875750 • STM
- Estero Quimpo • 37.76683°S 72.40863°W • 3874070 • STM
- Estero Rucacalquin • 37.77219°S 72.16246°W • 3872749 • STM
- Río Tué • 37.77556°S 71.5347°W • 3868972 • STM • (Estero Otue, Estero Otué, Rio Tue, Río Tué)
- Estero Coihueco • 37.78009°S 73.54744°W • 3894399 • STM
- Estero Ruca Raqui • 37.78072°S 73.54596°W • 3872732 • STM
- Estero Quillehua • 37.78113°S 72.2037°W • 3874138 • STM
- Río Pichibureo • 37.78164°S 72.01584°W • 3876305 • STM
- Estero Copahue • 37.78333°S 71.2°W • 3893672 • STM
- Estero Coihueco • 37.78391°S 71.8641°W • 3894398 • STM
- Estero Coihuequito • 37.78736°S 71.82525°W • 3894384 • STM
- Estero Indio • 37.79622°S 72.32871°W • 3887257 • STM
- Estero Licauquén • 37.8015°S 73.47502°W • 3883259 • STM
- Estero Los Alerces • 37.81167°S 72.00578°W • 3882457 • STM
- Estero Callín • 37.81225°S 73.39254°W • 3897231 • STM
- Estero La Máquina • 37.81334°S 72.18422°W • 3885393 • STM
- Río Curaco • 37.81667°S 73.46667°W • 3892916 • STM
- Estero Saltuco • 37.8189°S 71.55724°W • 3872490 • STM
- Estero Agua Blanca • 37.82077°S 71.67891°W • 3900584 • STM
- Estero Lirque • 37.82515°S 72.18798°W • 3883094 • STM • (Estero Lirque, Lingue)
- Río Quenco • 37.82898°S 71.67689°W • 3874380 • STM
- Estero Pitril Sur • 37.83591°S 71.58464°W • 3875749 • STM
- Estero Ranquilco • 37.83865°S 73.56456°W • 3873734 • STM
- Estero Epun • 37.85°S 71.51667°W • 3890019 • STM
- Estero Vilotregua • 37.86667°S 71.51667°W • 3868136 • STM
- Estero Boquiamargo • 37.8685°S 71.61372°W • 3898051 • STM • (Estero Boquiamarga, Estero Boquiamargo)
- Estero Pangue • 37.87056°S 73.5406°W • 3877370 • STM
- Estero Hilotregua • 37.8799°S 71.5189°W • 3888003 • STM
- Estero Quillaileo • 37.89591°S 71.61178°W • 3874176 • STM
- Río Pangue • 37.89996°S 71.62728°W • 3877364 • STM
- Estero Tromen • 37.90014°S 73.31488°W • 3869056 • STM
- Río Pichimulchén • 37.90836°S 71.99188°W • 3876238 • STM
- Estero Lirgueno • 37.91385°S 72.07531°W • 3883098 • STM
- Estero San Pedro • 37.93319°S 71.56643°W • 3871807 • STM
- Río Llancao • 37.94094°S 73.50168°W • 3882987 • STM • (Estero Llancao, Rio Llancao, Río Llancao)
- Estero Ranquilmo • 37.94914°S 73.25704°W • 3873729 • STM
- Estero Barros • 37.95312°S 73.44557°W • 3898664 • STM
- Río Pinares • 37.95805°S 71.80555°W • 3875942 • STM
- Río Tres Vientos • 37.96258°S 72.04794°W • 3869129 • STM
- Estero La Máquina • 37.96962°S 71.79272°W • 3885392 • STM
- Estero Teguanieque • 37.9697°S 71.56367°W • 3870049 • STM
- Río Butaco • 37.97652°S 71.55346°W • 3897669 • STM
- Río Lladen • 37.98333°S 71.28333°W • 3883049 • STM
- Río Rerihuire • 37.99151°S 71.53007°W • 3873408 • STM
- Río Paicaví • 37.99333°S 73.48032°W • 3877777 • STM • (Rio Paicavi, Rio Paicovi, Río Paicaví, Río Paicovi)

- Río Peleco • 37.90136°S 73.40655°W • 3876784 • STM

- Río Leiva • 37.80916°S 73.4103°W • 3883426 • STM

- Estero Repute • 37.82368°S 73.35508°W • 3873420 • STM Reputo?
- Río Cayucupil • 37.82129°S 73.35816°W • 3896065 • STM • (Estero Conhueco, Riachuelo de Conhueco, Rio Cayucupil, Río Cayucupil)

- Estero Cabrería • 37.81634°S 73.25042°W • 3897561 • STM • (Arroyo Cabreria, Arroyo Cabrería, Estero Cabreria, Estero Cabrería, Rio Butamalal, Río Butamalal)

- Río Tucapel • 37.80892°S 73.41131°W • 3868982 • STM

- Estero Henteli
- Río Caramávida • 37.7153°S 73.37018°W • 3896769 • STM • (Rio Caramavida, Rio Curamavida, Rio Curamávida, Rio Grande, Río Caramávida, Río Grande)

- Puyehue River

- Lanalhue Lake (X!)

- Elicura River
- Calebu River

- Río Agrio • 38.01631°S 71.94776°W • 3900625 • STM
- Río Coliqueo • 38.02313°S 71.13527°W • 3894232 • STM • (Rio Colicheo, Rio Coliqueo, Río Colicheo, Río Coliqueo)
- Río Diablo • 38.03175°S 71.76651°W • 3892509 • STM • (Rio Diablo, Rio El Diablo, Río Diablo, Río El Diablo)
- Estero Aguas Blancas • 38.03663°S 71.93146°W • 3900437 • STM
- Río Pocuno • 38.03697°S 73.40272°W • 3875561 • STM
- Río Trananahue • 38.04354°S 71.23418°W • 3869345 • STM
- Río Diablito • 38.04433°S 71.7335°W • 3892538 • STM • (Rio Diablito, Rio El Diablito, Río Diablito, Río El Diablito)
- Río Huira • 38.04868°S 71.46672°W • 3887484 • STM
- Río Quipuca • 38.0617°S 71.43931°W • 3873964 • STM
- Río Pinca • 38.06908°S 71.4385°W • 3875940 • STM
- Río Lleulleu • 38.08017°S 73.45428°W • 3882908 • STM (also Araucania)
- Estero Huilmo • 38.08439°S 73.45098°W • 3887518 • STM • (Estero Huilmo, Estero Machihue)
- Estero Coihueco • 38.08518°S 73.3053°W • 3894397 • STM
- Estero Negro • 38.09105°S 71.66524°W • 3878812 • STM • (Estero Negro, Rio Negro, Río Negro)
- Estero Pidelco • 38.09584°S 73.35548°W • 3876180 • STM
- Río Grande • 38.09712°S 71.45759°W • 3888778 • STM
- Estero Junquillo • 38.10583°S 73.27808°W • 3886692 • STM
- Estero Chacras Buenas • 38.11819°S 73.17635°W • 3895712 • STM
- Quebrada Melinchique • 38.11867°S 73.17585°W • 3880109 • STM • (Quebrada Melinchique, Rio Melinchique, Río Melinchique)
- Río Huillinco • 38.11994°S 73.27339°W • 3887527 • STM • (Rio Huillinco, Rio Lluillinco, Río Huillinco, Río Lluillinco)
- Estero Licauquen • 38.12414°S 73.17807°W • 3883258 • STM • (Estero Licauquen, Rio Licauquen, Río Licauquen)

- Estero Pilmaiquén • 37.7517°S 73.45491°W • 3875966 • STM

- Estero Chanquin • 38.13374°S 73.1874°W • 3895452 • STM • (Estero Chanquin, Rio Chanquin, Río Chanquin)
- Estero Racui • 38.16592°S 71.69664°W • 3873870 • STM
- Estero Auquinco • 38.16652°S 71.54877°W • 3899123 • STM • (Estero Auquinco, Quebrada Bella Vista)
- Estero Limenmahuida • 38.16755°S 71.56336°W • 3883192 • STM • (Estero Limenmahuida, Quebrada Negra)
- Estero Cristales • 38.16894°S 71.53394°W • 3893292 • STM • (Estero Cristales, Rio Cuchillahue, Río Cuchillahue)
- Estero Tranaquepe • 38.20261°S 73.45745°W • 3869343 • STM
- Estero Mahuilque • 38.20836°S 73.26519°W • 3881010 • STM • (Estero Mahuilque, Estero Manuilque, Rio Mahuilque, Río Mahuilque)
- Estero Medihueco • 38.22722°S 73.36251°W • 3880222 • STM
- Río Quidico • 38.24922°S 73.49077°W • 3874289 • STM
- Río Grande • 38.28632°S 73.46508°W • 3888777 • STM • (Quebrada Honda, Rio Grande, Río Grande)
- Estero Colcuma • 38.32686°S 73.49426°W • 3894302 • STM
- Estero Huillinco • 38.33075°S 73.45122°W • 3887535 • STM • (Estero Huillinco, Rio Huillinco, Río Huillinco)
- Estero Matranquil • 38.35146°S 73.46308°W • 3880328 • STM • (Estero Macranqui, Estero Matranquil, Rio Matraquin, Río Matraquin)
- Estero Quilquilci • 38.35562°S 73.47366°W • 3874083 • STM
- Río Cuyel • 38.36956°S 73.43097°W • 3892790 • STM
- Estero Molino • 38.37942°S 73.51935°W • 3879601 • STM
- Río Quillaicahue • 38°S 71.31667°W • 3874183 • STM
- Río Malla • 38°S 71.48333°W • 3880854 • STM
- Río Huenencura • 38°S 71.33333°W • 3887657 • STM • (Rio Huencura, Rio Huenencura, Río Huencura, Río Huenencura)
- Río Loncotripai • 38.39932°S 73.38602°W • 3882571 • STM
- Estero Los Maquis • 38.40465°S 73.35823°W • 3881795 • STM
- Estero Boquerihue • 38.43574°S 73.52233°W • 3898062 • STM • (Estero Boquerihue, Estero Boquerino)
- Estero Guapi • 38.44063°S 73.31896°W • 3888392 • STM
- Estero Poduco • 38.45847°S 73.31536°W • 3875554 • STM

== See also ==
- List of lakes in Chile
- List of volcanoes in Chile
- List of islands of Chile
- List of fjords, channels, sounds and straits of Chile
- List of lighthouses in Chile
