= List of IEEE Milestones =

The following Institute of Electrical and Electronics Engineers (IEEE) milestones represent key historical achievements in electrical and electronic engineering.

== Prior to 1800 ==
- 1751 – Book Experiments and Observations on Electricity by Benjamin Franklin
- 1757–1775 – Benjamin Franklin's Work in London
- 1776 – Elekiteru: First electrostatic generator in Japan by Gennai Hiraga
- 1799 – Alessandro Volta's Electrical Battery Invention

== 1800–1850 ==
- 1804 – Francisco Salvá Campillo's Electric Telegraph
- 1820–1827 – The Birth of Electrodynamics
- 1828–1837 – Pavel Schilling's Pioneering Contribution to Practical Telegraphy
- 1836 – Nicholas Callan's Pioneering Contributions to Electrical Science and Technology
- 1838 – Demonstration of Practical Telegraphy

== 1850–1870 ==
- 1852 – Electric Fire alarm system
- 1860–1871 – Maxwell's equations
- 1860–1863 – First Studies on Ring Armature for Direct-Current Dynamos
- 1861 – Transcontinental Telegraph
- 1861–1867 – Standardisation of the Ohm
- 1866 – Landing of the Transatlantic Cable
- 1866 – County Kerry Transatlantic Cable Stations

== 1870–1890 ==
- 1876 – First Intelligible Voice Transmission over Electric Wire
- 1876 – Thomas Alva Edison Historic Site at Menlo Park
- 1876 – First Distant Speech Transmission in Canada
- 1882 – Vulcan Street Plant
- 1882 – First Central Station in South Carolina
- 1882 – Pearl Street Station
- 1884 – First AIEE Technical Meeting
- 1885 – Galileo Ferraris's Rotating Fields and Early Induction Motors
- 1886 – Alternating Current Electrification, Great Barrington, Massachusetts, by William Stanley, Jr.
- 1886 – First Generation and Experimental Proof of Electromagnetic Waves
- 1886–1888 – Electric Lighting of the Kingdom of Hawaii
- 1887 – Thomas A. Edison West Orange Laboratories and Factories
- 1887 – Weston Meters, first portable current and voltage meters
- 1888 – Richmond Union Passenger Railway
- 1889 – Power System of Boston's Rapid Transit
- 1889 – First Exploration and Proof of Liquid Crystals

== 1890–1900 ==
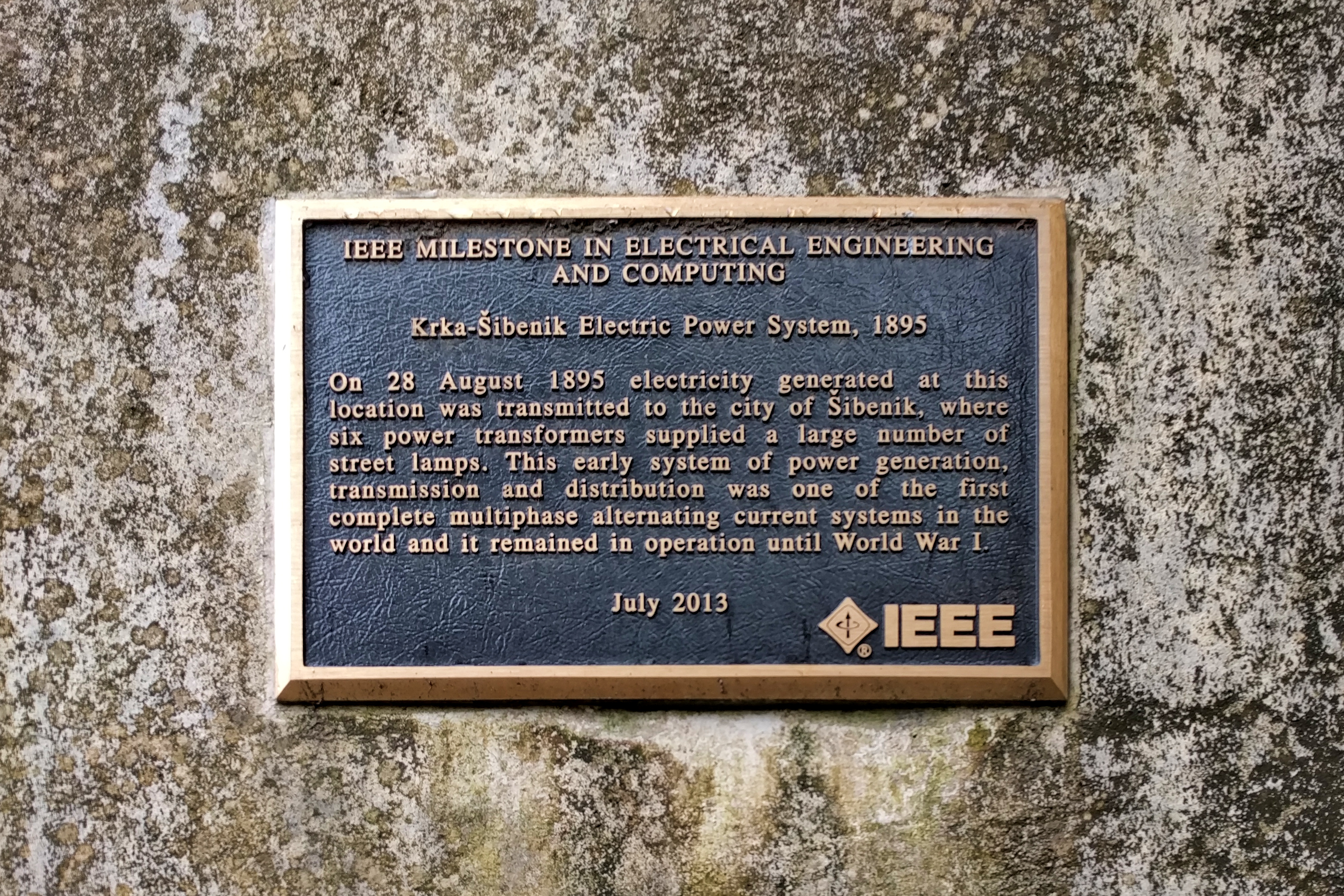
Krka-Šibenik Electric Power System plaque dedicated in 2013

- 1890 – Discovery of Radioconduction by Édouard Branly, making use of a coherer
- 1890 – Keage Power Station, Japan's First Commercial Hydroelectric Plant
- 1891 – Ames Hydroelectric Generating Plant
- 1893 – Mill Creek No. 1 Hydroelectric Plant
- 1893 – Birth and Growth of Primary and Secondary Battery Industries in Japan
- 1894 – First Millimeter-wave Communication Experiments by Jagadish Chandra Bose
- 1895 – Adams Hydroelectric Generating Plant
- 1895 – Popov's Contribution to the Development of Wireless Communication
- 1895 – Guglielmo Marconi's Experiments in Wireless telegraphy
- 1895 – Electrification by Baltimore and Ohio Railroad
- 1895 – Krka-Šibenik Electric Power System
- 1895 – Folsom Powerhouse three-phase system
- 1896 – Budapest Metroline No. 1
- 1897 – Chivilingo Hydroelectric Plant
- 1898 – Decew Falls Hydro-Electric Plant
- 1898 – Rheinfelden Hydroelectric Power Plant
- 1898 – French Transatlantic Telegraph Cable
- 1899–1902 – First Operational Use Of Wireless Telegraphy in the Anglo-Boer War
- 1899 – Calcutta Electric Supply Corp

== 1900–1920 ==
- 1900 – Georgetown Steam Hydro Generating Plant
- 1901 – Transmission of Transatlantic Radio Signals
- 1901 – Reception of Transatlantic Radio Signals
- 1901 – Early Developments in Remote-Control by Leonardo Torres Quevedo
- 1901–1902 – Rationalization of Units
- 1901–1905 String Galvanometer
- 1902 – Poulsen-Arc Radio Transmitter
- 1903 – Vučje Hydroelectric Plant
- 1904 – Alexanderson Radio Alternator
- 1904 – Fleming valve
- 1904 – Radar Predecessor
- 1906 – Pinawa Hydroelectric Power Project
- 1906 – First Wireless Radio Broadcast by Reginald Fessenden
- 1906 – Grand Central Terminal Electrification
- 1907 – Alternating-Current Electrification of the New York, New Haven and Hartford Railroad
- 1909 – Shoshone Transmission Line
- 1909 – World's First Reliable Hight Voltage Power Fuse
- 1911 – Discovery of superconductivity
- 1914 – Panama Canal Electrical and Control Installations
- 1915–1918 – Invention of Sonar
- 1916 – Czochralski Process

== 1920–1930 ==
- 1920 – Westinghouse Radio Station KDKA (AM)
- 1920 – Funkerberg Königs Wusterhausen first radio broadcast in Germany
- 1921–1923 – Piezoelectric Oscillator
- 1921 – RCA Central, 220 kW transoceanic radio facility
- 1922 – Neutrodyne Circuit
- 1924 – Directive Shortwave Antenna (Yagi–Uda antenna)
- 1924–1941 – Development of electronic television
- 1924 – Enrico Fermi's major contribution to semiconductor statistics
- 1925 – Bell Telephone Laboratories
- 1926 – First Public Demonstration of Television
- 1928 – One-way police radio communication
- 1928 – Raman Effect
- 1929 – Shannon Scheme for the electrification of the Irish Free State
- 1929 – Largest private (DC) generating plant in the U.S.A.
- 1929 – Yosami Radio Transmitting Station
- 1929 – First blind takeoff, flight, and landing; using designated radio and aeronautical instrumentation

== 1930–1940 ==
- 1930–1945 – Development of Ferrite Materials and their applications
- 1931 – Invention of Stereo Sound Reproduction
- 1932 – First Breaking of Enigma Code by the Team of Polish Cipher Bureau
- 1933 – Two-Way Police Radio Communication
- 1933 – Invention of a Temperature-Insensitive Quarz Oscillation Plate
- 1934 – Long-Range Shortwave Voice Transmissions from Byrd's Antarctic Expedition
- 1937 – Westinghouse Atom Smasher
- 1938 – Zenit Parabolic Reflector L-Band Pulsed Radar
- 1939 – Atanasoff–Berry Computer
- 1939–1945 – Code-breaking at Bletchley Park during World War II
- 1939 – Single-element Unidirectional Microphone – Shure Unidyne
- 1939 – Claude Shannon, development of Information Theory
- 1939–1949 – Development of the Cavity Magnetron

== 1940–1950 ==
- 1940 – FM Police Radio Communication
- 1940–1945 – MIT Radiation Laboratory
- 1940–1946 – Loran, long range navigation
- 1941 – Opana Radar Site
- 1942–1945 – US Naval Computing Machine Laboratory
- 1944–1959 – Whirlwind Computer, Cambridge, Massachusetts
- 1944–1959 – Harvard Mark 1 Computer
- 1945 – Merrill Wheel-Balancing System
- 1945 – Rincón del Bonete Plant and Transmission System
- 1946 – Electronic Numerical Integrator and Computer (ENIAC)
- 1946–1953 – Monochrome-Compatible Electronic Color Television
- 1946 – Detection of Radar Signals Reflected from the Moon
- 1947 – Invention of the First Transistor at Bell Telephone Laboratories, Inc.
- 1947 – Invention of Holography
- 1948 – Birth of the Barcode
- 1948 – The Discovery of the Principle of Self-Complementarity in Antennas and the Mushiake Relationship
- 1948 – First Atomic Clock
- 1948–1951 – Manchester University "Baby" Computer and its Derivatives

== 1950–1960 ==
- 1950–1969 – Electronic Technology for Space Rocket Launches
- 1950 – First External Cardiac Pacemaker
- 1951 – Manufacture of Transistors
- 1951 – Experimental Breeder Reactor I
- 1951–1958 – SAGE-Semi-Automatic Ground Environment
- 1951–1952 – A-0 Compiler and Initial Development of Automatic Programming
- 1953 – First Television Broadcast in Western Canada
- 1954 – Gotland High Voltage Direct Current Link
- 1954 – Parametron
- 1955 – WEIZAC Computer
- 1956 – RAMAC
- 1956 – The First Submarine Transatlantic Telephone Cable System (TAT-1)
- 1956–1963 – Kurobe River No. 4 Hydropower Plant
- 1956 – Ampex Videotape Recorder
- 1956 – Birth of Silicon Valley
- 1957–1958 – First Wearable Cardiac Pacemaker
- 1957 – SCR/Thyristor
- 1957–1962 – Atlas Computer and the Invention of Virtual Memory
- 1958 – First Semiconductor Integrated Circuit (IC) by Jack Kilby
- 1958 – Star of Laufenburg Interconnection
- 1958 – The Trans-Canada Microwave System
- 1959 – Semiconductor planar process by Jean Hoerni and silicon integrated circuit by Robert Noyce
- 1959 – Commercialization and industrialization of photovoltaic cells by Sharp Corporation

== 1960–1970 ==
- 1961–1984 – IBM Thomas J. Watson Research Center
- 1960 – TIROS I Television Infrared Observation Satellite
- 1960 – First Working Laser
- 1961–1964 – First Optical Fiber Laser and Amplifier
- 1962–1967 – Object-oriented programming
- 1962 – Stanford Linear Accelerator Center
- 1962 – Alouette-ISIS Satellite Program
- 1962 – First Transatlantic Television Signal via Satellite
- 1962 – First Transatlantic Transmission of a Television Signal via Satellite
- 1962 – First Transatlantic Reception of a Television Signal via Satellite
- 1962–1967 – Pioneering Work on the Quartz Electronic Wristwatch at Centre Electronique Horloger, Switzerland
- 1962 – Mercury spacecraft MA-6, Col. John Glenn piloted the Mercury Friendship 7 spacecraft in the first FAI-legal completed human-orbital flight on 20 February 1962. (Note: While Soviet spacecraft had made human orbital flights prior, they are not FAI-certified because the pilots ejected from the spacecraft before landing, which by FAI rules denotes an uncompleted (or failed) flight.)
- 1962–1972 – Grumman Lunar Module
- 1962–1972 – Apollo Guidance Computer
- 1962–1968 – First Geographic Information System
- 1962 – Semiconductor Laser
- 1963 – NAIC/Arecibo Radiotelescope
- 1963 – Taum Sauk Pumped-Storage Electric Power Plant
- 1963 – First Transpacific Reception of a Television (TV) Signal via Satellite
- 1963 – ASCII
- 1964 – Mount Fuji Radar System
- 1964 – Tokaido Shinkansen (Bullet Train)
- 1964–1973 – Pioneering Work on Electronic Calculators by Sharp Corporation
- 1964 – TPC-1 Transpacific Cable System
- 1964 – High-definition television System
- 1964 – Birth of the BASIC computer language
- 1965–1984 – Alvin Deep-Sea Research Submersible
- 1965 – First 735 kV AC Transmission System
- 1965–1971 – Railroad Ticketing Examining System (developed by OMRON of Japan)
- 1965 – Dadda multiplier
- 1965 – Moore's Law
- 1965–1978 – Development of Computer Graphics and Visualization Techniques
- 1966 – Interactive Video Games
- 1966 – Shakey, the first mobile robot to be able to reason about its actions
- 1966 – DIALOG Online Search System
- 1967 – First Astronomical Observations Using Very Long Baseline Interferometry
- 1968 – CERN Experimental Instrumentation
- 1968 – Liquid-crystal display by George H. Heilmeier
- 1968 – Public Demonstration of Online Systems and Personal Computing
- 1969 – Electronic Quartz Wristwatch, Seiko Quartz-Astron 35SQ
- 1969 – Birth of the Internet
- 1969 – Inception of the ARPANET
- 1969–1975 – Invention of Public-key Cryptography
- 1969 – Apollo 11 Lunar Laser Ranging Experiment (LURE)
- 1969 – Parkes Radiotelescope
- 1969–1995 – Mode S Air Traffic Control Radar Beacon System

== 1970–1980 ==
- 1970 – World's First Low-Loss Optical Fiber for Telecommunications
- 1971–1978 – The first word processor for the Japanese Language, JW-10
- 1969–1970 – SPICE Circuit Simulation Program
- 1971 – Demonstration of the ALOHA Packet Radio Data Network
- 1971 – First Computerized Tomography (CT) X-ray Scanner
- 1971–1977 – Development of the Commercial Laser Printer
- 1972 – Nelson River HVDC Transmission System
- 1972 – Development of the HP-35, the First Handheld Scientific Calculator
- 1972 – Eel River High Voltage Direct Current Converter Station
- 1972 – First Practical Field Emission Electron Microscope
- 1972 – SHAKEY: The World’s First Mobile Intelligent Robot
- 1972 – Polymer Self-Regulating Heat-Tracing Cable
- 1972–1989 – Gravitational-Wave Antenna
- 1972–1987 – Deep Space Station 43
- 1972–1983 – The Xerox Alto Establishes Personal Networked Computing
- 1973–1985 – Superconducting Magnet System for the Fermilab Tevatron Accelerator/Collider
- 1973 – The First Two-Dimensional Nuclear Magnetic Resonance Image (MRI)
- 1973–1985 – Ethernet Local Area Network (LAN)
- 1974 – First 500 MeV Proton Beam from the TRIUMF Cyclotron
- 1974–1982 – First Real-Time Speech Communication on Packet Networks
- 1974 – The CP/M Microcomputer Operating System
- 1974 – Transmission Control Protocol (TCP) Enables the Internet
- 1975 – Line Spectrum Pair (LSP) for high-compression speech coding
- 1975 – Gapless Metal Oxide Surge Arrester (MOSA) for electric power systems
- 1975 – Handheld Digital Camera
- 1976 – Development of VHS, a World Standard for Home Video Recording
- 1976–1978 – The Floating Gate EEPROM
- 1977 – Lempel–Ziv Data Compression Algorithm
- 1977 – Vapor-phase Axial Deposition Method for Mass Production of High-quality Optical Fiber
- 1977 – Perpendicular Magnetic Recording
- 1978 – Speak & Spell, the First Use of a Digital Signal Processing IC for Speech Generation
- 1978 – First Digitally Processed Image from a Spaceborne Synthetic Aperture Radar
- 1978 – First Demonstration of a Fibre Bragg Grating
- 1979 – Compact disc Audio Player
- 1979 – 20-inch Diameter Photomultiplier Tubes
- 1979 – Amorphous Silicon Thin Film Field-Effect Transistor Switches for Liquid Crystal Displays
- 1979 – HEMT (high-electron-mobility transistor)

== 1980 to 1990 ==
- 1980 – International Standardization of Group 3 Facsimile
- 1980–1982 – First RISC (Reduced Instruction-Set Computing) Microprocessor
- 1980 – Outdoor large-scale color display system
- 1980 – MPD7720DSP, programmable digital signal processor chip μPD7720
- 1980–1981 – Inverter-Driven Air Conditioner
- 1980–1999 – Origin of the IEEE 802 Family of Networking Standards
- 1981 – 16-Bit Monolithic Digital-to-analog converter (DAC) for Digital Audio
- 1981 – Map-Based Automotive navigation system
- 1981–1988 – The Development of RenderMan for Photorealistic Graphics
- 1982 – Nobeyama 45-m Telescope
- 1982 – Human Rescue Enabled by Space Technology
- 1982 – First Large-Scale Fingerprint ID
- 1982 – Commercialization of Multilayer Ceramic Capacitors with Nickel Electrodes
- 1984 – First Direct-broadcast satellite Service
- 1984 – The MU (Middle and Upper atmosphere) radar
- 1984–1989 – Active Shielding of Superconducting Magnets
- 1984–1993 – MPEG Multimedia Integrated Circuits
- 1984 – TRON Real-time Operating System Family
- 1984–1996 – Development of 193-nm Projection Photolithography
- 1985 – Toshiba T1100, a Pioneering Contribution to the Development of Laptop PC
- 1985 – Emergency Warning Code Signal Broadcasting System
- 1985 – Multiple Technologies on a Chip
- 1985 – IEEE Standard 754 for Binary Floating-Point Arithmetic
- 1986 – Fiber Optic Connectors
- 1987 – High-Temperature Superconductivity
- 1987 – SPARC RISC Architecture
- 1987 – Superconductivity at 93 Kelvin
- 1987 – WaveLAN, Precursor of Wi-Fi
- 1987–1995 – MTI Portable Satellite Communication Terminals
- 1988 – Sharp 14-Inch Thin Film Transistor Liquid-Crystal Display (TFT-LCD) for TV
- 1988 – Virginia Smith High-Voltage Direct-Current Converter Station
- 1988 – Trans-Atlantic Telephone Fiber-optic Submarine Cable, TAT-8
- 1988 – First Robotic Control from Human Brain Signals
- 1989 – Development of CDMA for Cellular Communications

== After 1990 ==
- 1992 – Super-Resolved Fluorescence Microscopy
- 1993–1997 – Asymmetric Digital Subscriber Line (ADSL) enabling broadband internet
- 1994 – Giant Metrewave Radio Telescope
- 1994 – QR (Quick Response) Code
- 1996–1998 – PageRank and the Birth of Google
- 1996 – Large-Scale Commercialization of a CDMA Cellular Communication System
- 1996–1997 – Integrated Circuits for satellite digital radio
- 1996 – Universal Serial Bus (USB)
- 1997 – Toyota Prius, the world's first mass-produced hybrid vehicle
