= Atacalco Airport =

- IATA: none; ICAO: SCAK

Summary
- Airport type: Public
- Serves: Recinto (es), Chile
- Elevation AMSL: 2,360 ft / 719 m
- Coordinates: 36°55′10″S 71°34′40″W

Map
- Location of Atacalco Airport in Chile

Runways
Direction	Length		Surface
Direction	m	ft	Surface
13/31	650	2,133	Grass
- Source: Landings.com Google Maps GCM

Atacalco Airport, Spanish: Aeropuerto Atacalco (ICAO: SCAK), is a rural airstrip 10 kilometres (6.2 mi) southeast of Recinto, a community in the Ñuble Region of Chile.

The airstrip is in the foothills of the Andes, in the narrow valley of the Diguillín River, 20 kilometres (12 mi) upstream from the river's entrance into the Chilean Central Valley. The runway is aligned with the river, with a steep dropoff southwest to the riverbed. There is mountainous terrain northeast and southwest of the runway.

The Chillan VOR-DME (Ident: CHI) is located 29.7 nautical miles (55.0 km) northwest of the airstrip.

== See also ==
- Transport in Chile
- List of airports in Chile
