= Battle of Reynogüelén (1536) =

1536 battle

Coordinates: 36°38′50″S 72°27′19″W

Date	Austral winter of 1536
Location	Reynogüelén
Result	Spanish victory

Belligerents
Spanish Empire	Mapuche tribes

Commanders and leaders
Gómez de Alvarado	Unknown

Strength
100 cavalry and 100 Spanish infantry, perhaps as many as 4,400 to 5,000 "indios auxiliares"	between 24,000 and 30,000 Not considered real, modern estimation 8,000

Casualties and losses
2 Spaniards killed several Spaniards and horses wounded many auxiliares killed or wounded	Heavy

The Battle of Reynogüelén took place between Spanish conquistadors and Mapuche soldiers, thought to have occurred near the confluence of the Ñuble and Itata Rivers, in Chile. This battle is an antecedent of the Arauco War.

== History ==
Diego de Almagro, after reaching the Mapocho Valley in 1536, sent Gómez de Alvarado with an expedition of 200 Spaniards, 100 cavalry and 100 foot, with a large group of Indian auxiliaries, to the south of Chile with the mission of exploring the country to the Strait of Magellan. The group advanced without encountering much resistance from the Promaucaes. After crossing the Itata River they were intercepted by a numerous contingent of Mapuches, perhaps as many as 24,000, armed with many bows and pikes.

The Mapuches launched a number of assaults which were successfully repulsed by the Spanish. Frustrated by these reverses and by disorientation caused by the horses, iron weapons, and armour of the conquistadors (all of which were previously unknown to the Mapuches), the natives retreated, leaving many dead and more than one hundred prisoners. The Spanish lost only two men but others were hurt.

Discouraged by the ferocity of the Mapuches, and the apparent lack of gold and silver in these lands, Gómez de Alvarado decided to return and inform Almagro what had happened. This battle had a strong influence on Almagro's entire expedition, and motivated, in part, its full retreat the following year to Peru.

== Sources ==
- de Góngora Marmolejo, Alonso, Historia de Todas las Cosas que han Acaecido en el Reino de Chile y de los que lo han gobernado (1536-1575) (History of All the Things that Have happened in the Kingdom of Chile and of those that have governed it (1536-1575)), University of Chile: Document Collections in complete texts: Cronicles (on line in Spanish)
  - Cap. II. De cómo el adelantado don Diego de Almagro vino al descubrimiento de Chile y por dónde se descubrió
- Mariño de Lobera, Pedro, Crónica del Reino de Chile, escrita por el capitán Pedro Mariño de Lobera....reducido a nuevo método y estilo por el Padre Bartolomé de Escobar. Edición digital a partir de Crónicas del Reino de Chile Madrid, Atlas, 1960, pp. 227-562, (Biblioteca de Autores Españoles; 569-575). Biblioteca Virtual Miguel de Cervantes (on line in Spanish)
  - Capítulo VI De la entrada ......Gómez de Alvarado......descubrir lo que había en la Tierra adentro y de una sangrienta batalla que tuvo con los bárbaros
- Carvallo y Goyeneche, Vicente, Descripcion Histórico Geografía del Reino de Chile (Description Historical Geography of the Kingdom of Chile), University of Chile: Document Collections in complete texts: Cronicles (on line in Spanish)
  - Tomo I, Capítulo I. Descubrimiento de Chile i entrada de los españoles en él.
