= Battle of Reynogüelén =

Battle of Reynogüelén may refer to:

- Battle of Reynogüelén (1536), between Spaniards and Mapuches during the expedition to Chile of the conqueror Diego de Almagro
- Battle of Reynogüelén (1565), between Spaniards and Mapuches during the Arauco War
