= Lebu =

Lebu may refer to:

- Lebu, Chile, a city and capital of the Arauco Province of the Biobio Region of Chile
- Lebu River, located in the Arauco Province of the Biobio Region of Chile
- LEBU, acronym for Large Eddy Break Up
- Libu or Lebu, Egyptian term for the people of Libya
- Lebu people, a Senegalese ethnic group
- Prince Lee Boo (or Lebu, 1764–1784), first visitor to Britain from Palau
