= Lebu River =

River in Chile

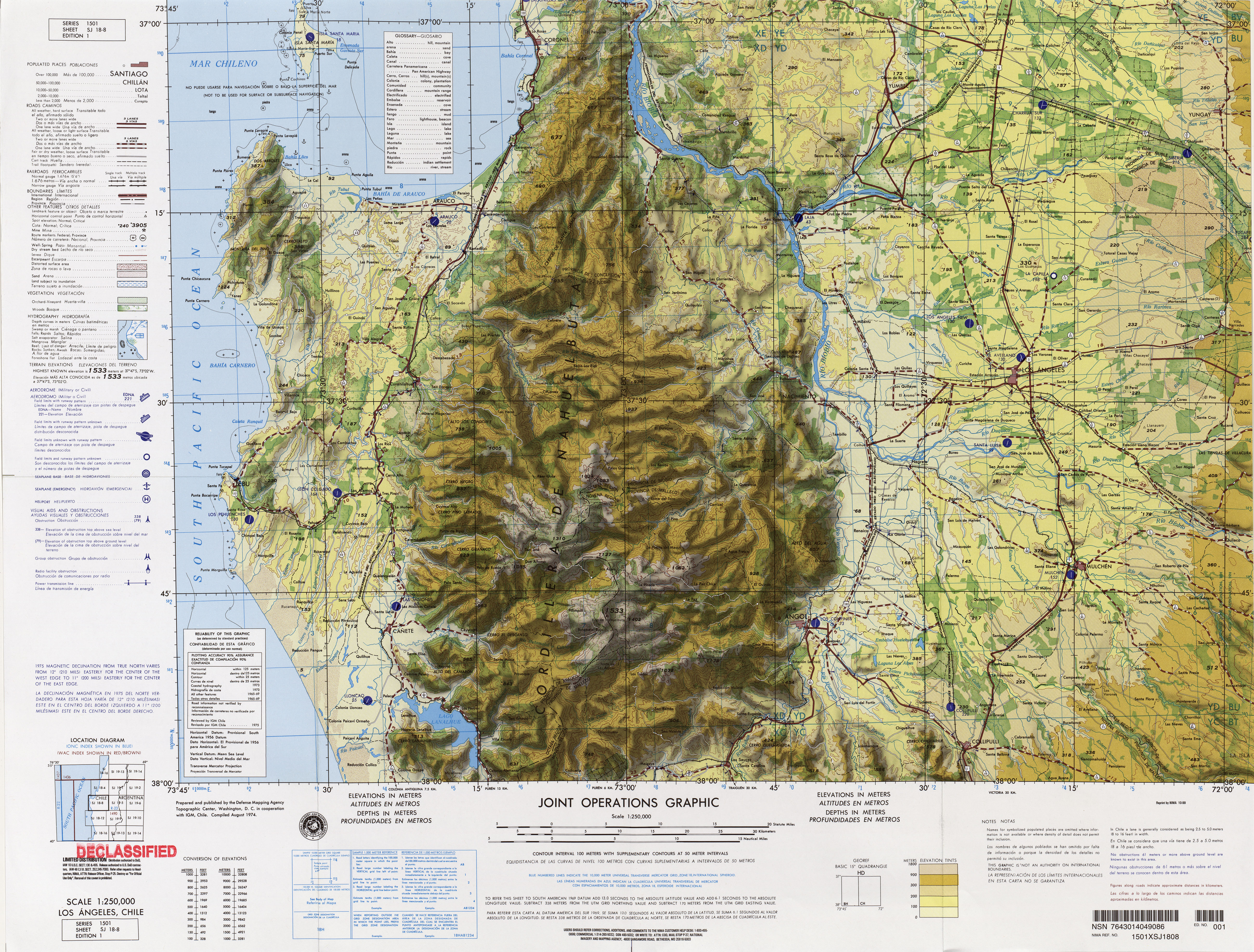
Lebu River

The Lebu River an important river of the Arauco Province in Chile. It originates in the western slope of the Cordillera de Nahuelbuta to the east of the city and port of Lebu, the capital of the province and named for the river.

== Description ==
The Lebu is formed from the confluence of the Riachuelos of Curanilahue and Pilpilco that meet at the base of that mountain range. From the confluence it continues westward, widening with the flow of the Riachuelos of Quilañanco and Curihuillín, and with several streams that join it from the wooded heights on both of its banks. It goes on to empty into the Pacific Ocean at 37° 36' Lat. and 73° 41 ' Lon. after a course of about 100 kilometers until it is below the ford of Cupaño, at the salto de Gualgalén, where this strong torrent of the river that is about 20 kilometers from its mouth meets the upper reach of the tidal estuary.

At the river mouth the coast forms a port or anchorage between the Morro de Tucapel to the south, and the Punta de Millonhue to the north. Between them extends the bar of the mouth, that only opens the way by a narrow channel. Above the mouth the river estuary in front of the city is narrow and further up the river is wide and deep. In the upper part of this estuary, is the location of the old fort of Santa Margarita de Austria.

The name of the river is an alteration of the Mapudungun leufü or leuvu, “river”; and in colonial times a valley of a river, that contained habitations of Indians was called a levo.

As a result of the 2010 Chile earthquake a large islet emerged at the mouth of the river. This area was the part of the coast that experienced the highest permanent uplift resulting from the earthquake.

== Sources ==
- Francisco Solano Asta-Buruaga y Cienfuegos, Diccionario geográfico de la República de Chile (Geographic dictionary of the Republic of Chile), SEGUNDA EDICIÓN CORREGIDA Y AUMENTADA, NUEVA YORK, D. APPLETON Y COMPAÑÍA, 1899.
