= Chivilingo Hydroelectric Plant =

Historic hydroelectric power station in Chile

Coordinates: 37°08′09″S 73°08′41.2″W

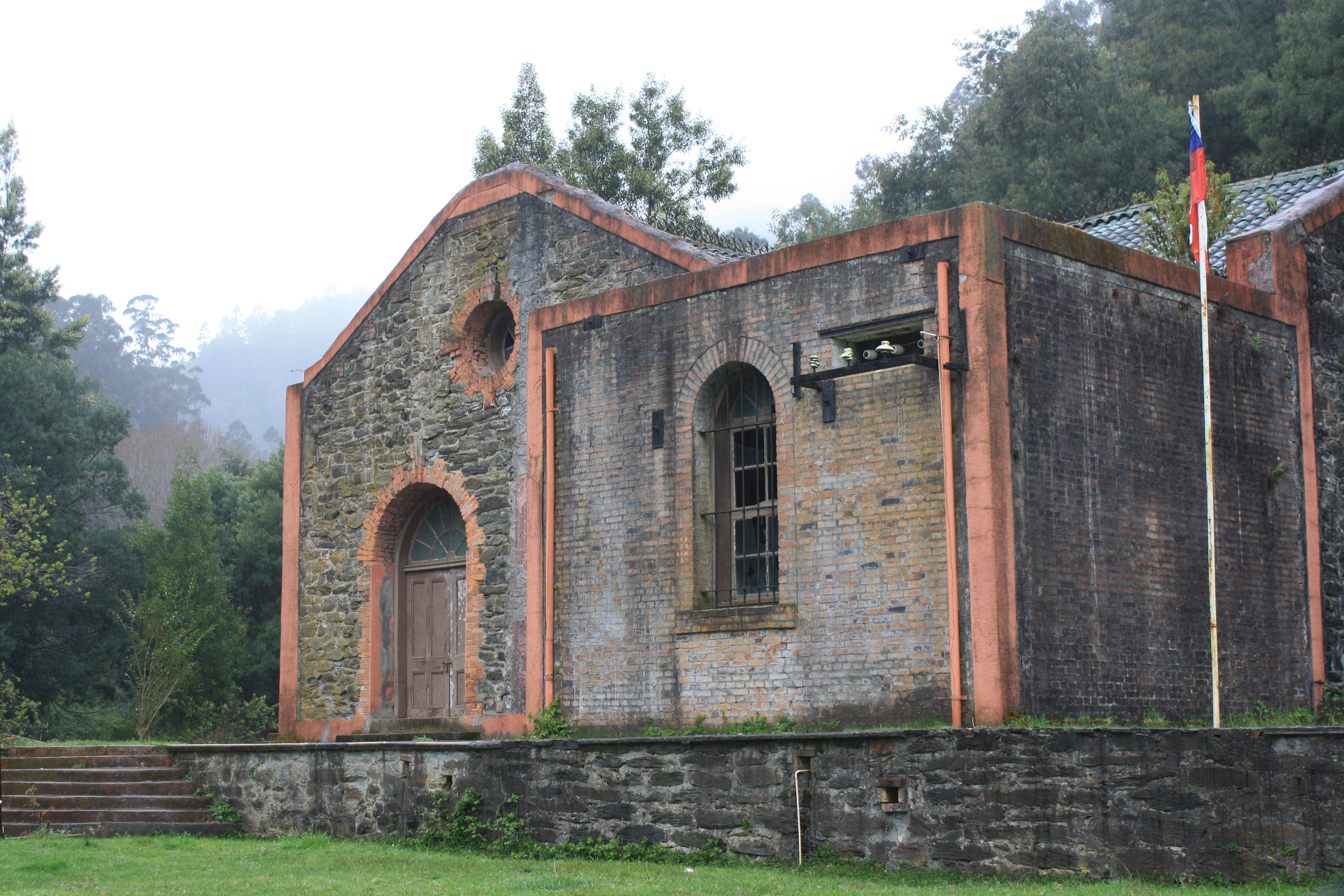
The hydroelectric power plant in 2012

Chivilingo Hydroelectric Plant is a historic hydroelectric power station located 14 kilometres (8.7 mi) south of Lota, Chile. It came on line in 1897, and was the first hydroelectric plant in Chile and the second in South America. The plant is now registered on the list of IEEE Milestones in electrical engineering, and open to visitors.

The Chivilingo plant dates to 1893 when its first feasibility studies were performed for the Lota undersea coal mine operated by the Compañía Explotadora de Lota y Coronel at depths of up to 12 kilometres (7.5 mi). Chief engineer William E. Raby formulated its initial plans, which settled upon the production of alternating current to feed three phase motors, powered by waterfalls of the nearby Chivilingo River.

Construction work began in 1896, with civil works and the aqueduct built by the mining company, and hydraulic and electric engineering performed by Consolidated Co. of North America and Schuckert & Co. of Nürnberg, Germany. Two Pelton turbines powered two alternators of 215 kilowatts (288 hp) each (315 horsepower, 400 volts, 360 amperes, 50 Hertz). The resultant alternating current power was then transferred to the undersea mine via a 10 kilovolt transmission line approximately 10 kilometres (6.2 mi) in length.

The Chivilingo plant was in operation from 1897 to 1975, in its later years as part of the Chilean Central Interconnected System. In 1998 it was transferred by the city of Lota to the Fundación Chile which now operates tours for visitors.
