= Merrill Wheel-Balancing System =

First electronic dynamic wheel-balancing system

The Merrill Wheel-Balancing System was the world's first electronic dynamic wheel-balancing system. It was invented in 1945 by Marcellus Merrill at the Merrill Engineering Laboratories, 2390 South Tejon Street, Englewood, Colorado, and is now recorded on the list of IEEE Milestones in electronic engineering and as an American Society of Mechanical Engineers landmark.

Before Merrill's invention, all wheel-balancing for automobiles, trucks, etc., required removal of the wheel from the vehicle. Most required some form of static balancing without wheel rotation, which was slow and error-prone.

Merrill's invention balanced wheels while still mounted to the vehicle, by spinning them at high speed and electronically analyzing the vibrations to trigger a stroboscope. Technicians could then determine where balancing weights should be added.
