= Cayucupil =

Village in Chile

Coordinates: 37.81°S 73.30°W

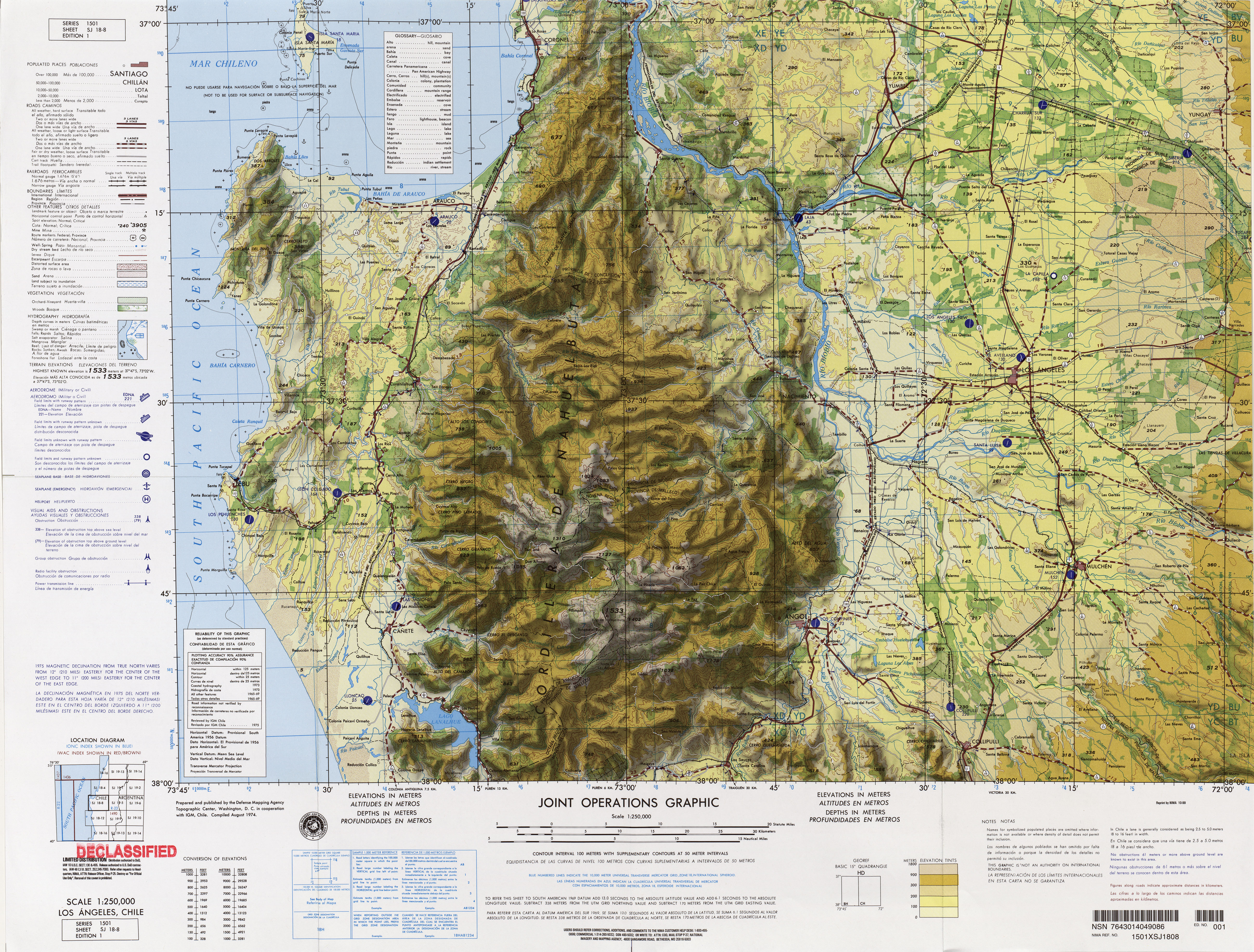
Cañete, Cayucupil and the river

Cayucupil is a valley, a hamlet and a riachuelo or small river in the vicinity of Cañete, Chile of the Arauco Province of the Bío Bío Region that has its origin in the western foothills of the Nahuelbuta Mountains, to the east of that city. It runs to the southwest from among broken and mountainous land, and then to the west through more level ground to join with the Tucapel River about five kilometers to southwest of the site that the original city of Cañete occupied. In its upper part is a passage that traverses the mountain range. Its name derives from the Mapudungun cayu six and quypil, frame of a house. It was a Moluche rehue of the Tucapel aillarehue.

== Sources ==
- Francisco Solano Asta-Buruaga y Cienfuegos, Diccionario geográfico de la República de Chile, SEGUNDA EDICIÓN CORREGIDA Y AUMENTADA, NUEVA YORK, D. APPLETON Y COMPAÑÍA. 1899. pg. 142
