= Leiva River =

Location
- Country: Chile

Physical characteristics
- Mouth: Tucapel River
  - location: Cañete
  - coordinates: 37°48′33″S 73°24′39″W

The Leiva River is a river of Chile.

== See also ==
- List of rivers of Chile
