= Niblinto River =

River in Ñuble Region, Chile

Location
- Country: Chile

The Niblinto River is a river in Ñuble Region in the southern portion of Central Chile. It is a tributary of the Cato River.

== See also ==
- List of rivers of Chile
- Los Huemules de Niblinto National Reserve
