= Los Huemules de Niblinto National Reserve =

National reserve in Ñuble Region, Chile

- IUCN category IV (habitat/species management area)
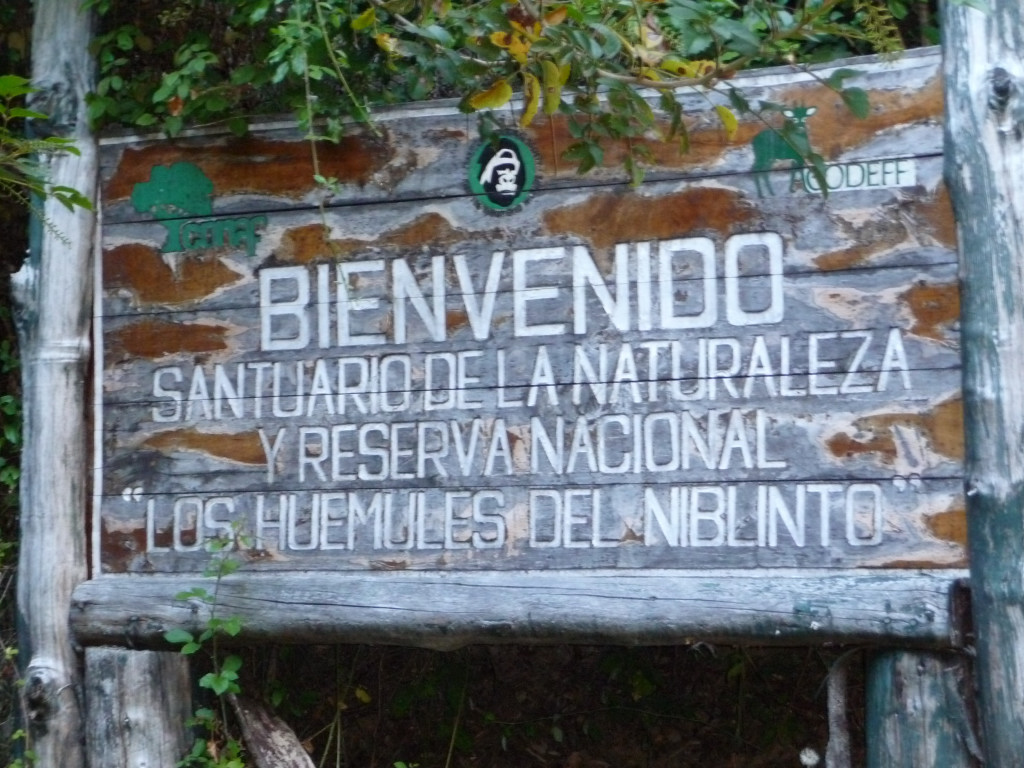
- Interactive map of Los Huemules de Niblinto National Reserve
- Location: Ñuble Region, Chile
- Nearest city: Coihueco
- Coordinates: 36°45′S 71°30′W
- Area: 20.23 km^{2} (7.81 sq mi)
- Designation: National reserve
- Designated: 1999
- Governing body: Corporación Nacional Forestal (CONAF)

Los Huemules de Niblinto National Reserve is a national reserve of Chile. It is located close to the northwest end of the Nevados de Chillán, in the upper Niblinto River basin. The reserve protects the northernmost population of South Andean deer.
