= Einthoven's triangle =

Concept in electrocardiography

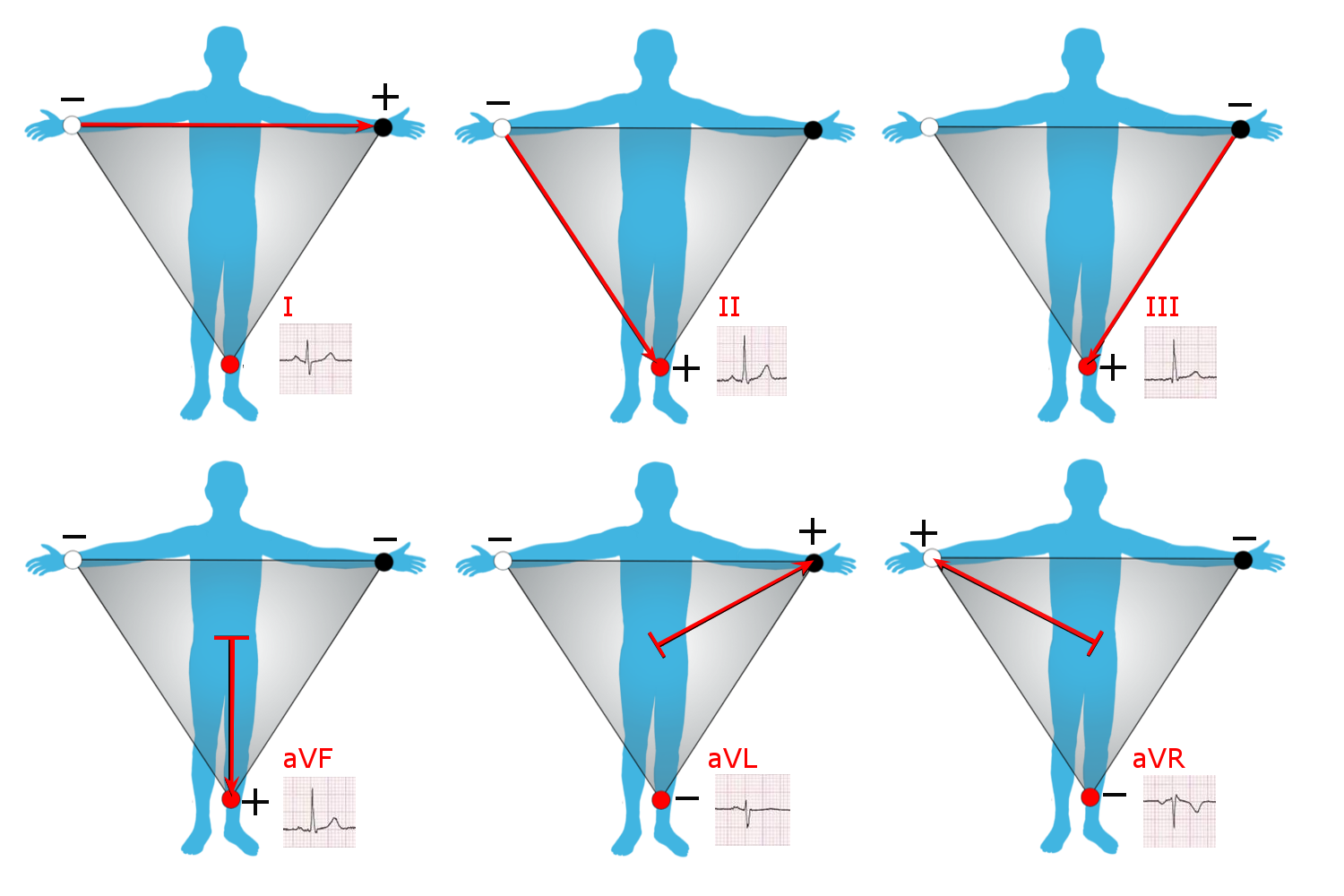
Graphical representation of Einthoven's triangle

Einthoven's triangle is an imaginary formation of three limb leads in a triangle used in the electrocardiography, formed by the two shoulders and the pubis. The shape forms an inverted equilateral triangle with the heart at the center. It is named after Willem Einthoven, who theorized its existence.

Einthoven used these measuring points, by immersing the hands and feet in pails of salt water, as the contacts for his string galvanometer, the first practical ECG machine.

== Lead placements ==
- Lead I — This axis goes from shoulder to shoulder, with the negative electrode placed on the right shoulder and the positive electrode placed on the left shoulder. This results in a 0-degree angle of orientation.

$$I = LA - RA$$

- Lead II — This axis goes from the right arm to the left leg, with the negative electrode on the shoulder and the positive one on the leg. This results in a +60 degree angle of orientation.

$$II = LL - RA$$

- Lead III — This axis goes from the left shoulder (negative electrode) to the right or left leg (positive electrode). This results in a +120 degree angle of orientation.

$$III = LL - LA$$

Electrodes may be placed distally or proximally on the limb without affecting the recording. The right leg electrode acts to reduce interference, and can be placed anywhere without an effect on the ECG results.

Each lead measures the electric field created by the heart during the depolarization and repolarization of myocytes. The electric field can be represented as a vector that changes continuously and can be measured by recording the voltage difference between electrodes.

== Using Einthoven's triangle to identify lead misplacements ==
Einthoven's triangle can be helpful in the identification in incorrect placement of leads. Incorrect placement of leads can lead to error in the recording, which can ultimately lead to misdiagnosis.

If the arm electrodes are reversed, lead I changes polarity, causing lead II and lead III to switch. If the right arm electrode is reversed with the leg's electrode, lead II changes polarity, causing lead I to become lead III, and vice versa. Reversal of the left arm and leg causes a change in polarity of lead III and switching of leads I and II.
