= Reynogüelén =

Reynogüelén, also spelled Reinogüelén, Reinohuelén, and Reynohuelén, was the original Mapudungun name of the eastern regions of what are now the communes of Parral in Linares Province, and Ñiquén, and San Carlos communes in the Diguillín Province of the Ñuble Region of Chile. It was also the original name of the upper reaches of the Perquilauquén River that passed through that area. It was later corrupted into Reinohuelén, Reinogüelén, Reinohuelén and Reynohuelén.

A place called Reinohuelen was also mentioned in a 1578 letter of the governor Rodrigo de Quiroga to Philip II where it indicated Reinohuelen to be located to the south of the Itata River, near where this river is joined with the Ñuble River.

== Sources ==
- Francisco Solano Asta-Buruaga y Cienfuegos, Diccionario geográfico de la República de Chile (Geographic dictionary of the Republic of Chile), SEGUNDA EDICIÓN CORREGIDA Y AUMENTADA, NUEVA YORK, D. APPLETON Y COMPAÑÍA, 1899.
- Diego Barros Arana, Historia jeneral de Chile, Tomo I y II, SANTIAGO; RAFAEL JOVER, EDITOR; CALLE DEL PUENTE, NUM. 15-D; 1884; Original from Oxford University, Digitized Nov. 2, 2007
