= Renegado River =

Location
- Country: Chile

The Renegado River is a river in Ñuble Region in the southern portion of Central Chile.

== See also ==
- List of rivers of Chile
