= Caramávida River =

Coordinates: 37.7153°S 73.3703°W

Location
- Country: Chile

The Caramávida River is a river of Chile.

== See also ==
- List of rivers of Chile
