= Riachuelo Quilañanco =

Location
- Country: Chile

The Riachuelo Quilañanco is a river in Chile, located in the Biobío Region. It is located near the Lebu River.

== See also ==
- List of rivers of Chile
