= Butamalal River =

Butamalal River Cabrería

Location
- Country: Chile

Physical characteristics
- Mouth
  - location: http://www.geonames.org/3897561/

The Butamalal River (a.k.a. Cabrería) is a river of Chile.

== See also ==
- List of rivers of Chile
