= Los Sauces River, Chile =

Los Sauces River
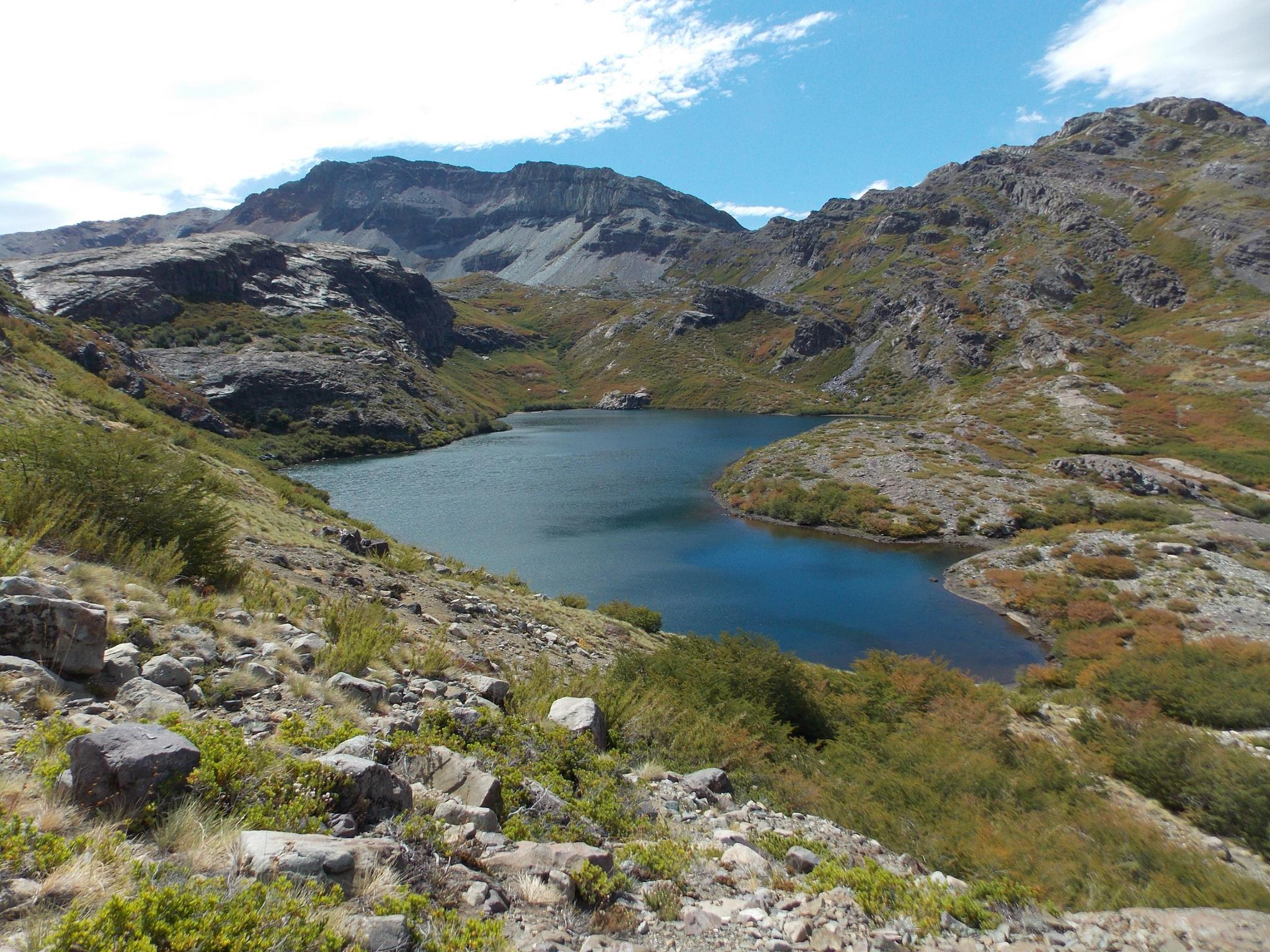

Location
- Country: Chile

The Los Sauces River is a river in Ñuble Region located in the southern portion of Central Chile.

== See also ==
- List of rivers of Chile
