= Willem Einthoven =

Dutch physiologist (1860–1927)

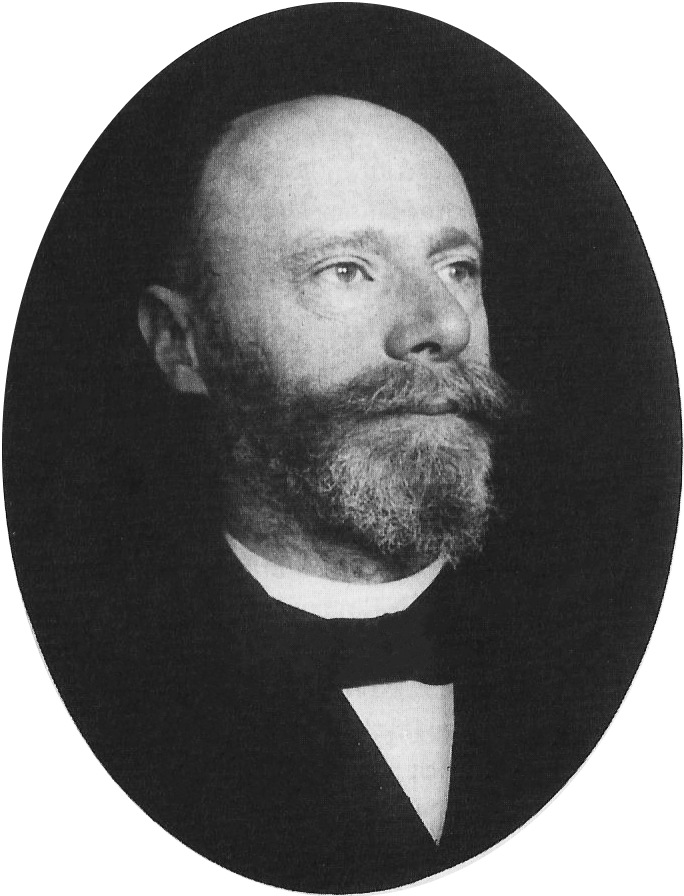
- Willem Einthoven in 1906
- Born: 21 May 1860; Semarang, Dutch East Indies
- Died: 29 September 1927 (aged 67); Leiden, Netherlands
- Education: University of Utrecht
- Known for: First practical electrocardiogram machine; Clinical electrocardiography; Einthoven's triangle
- Awards: Nobel Prize in Medicine in 1924
- Scientific career
- Fields: Physiology
- Workplaces: University of Leiden

Willem Einthoven (21 May 1860 – 29 September 1927) was a Dutch medical doctor and physiologist. He invented the first practical electrocardiograph (ECG or EKG) in 1895 and received the Nobel Prize in Physiology or Medicine in 1924 for it ("for the discovery of the mechanism of the electrocardiogram").

== Early life and education ==
Willem Einthoven was born in Semarang on Java in the Dutch East Indies (now Indonesia), the son of Louise Marie Mathilde Caroline de Vogel and Jacob Einthoven. His father, a doctor, died when Willem was a child. His mother returned to the Netherlands with her children in 1870 and settled in Utrecht. His father was of Jewish and Dutch descent, and his mother's ancestry was Dutch and Swiss. In 1885, Einthoven received a medical degree from the University of Utrecht.

== Career ==
He became a professor at the University of Leiden in 1886. He married his first cousin Frédérique Jeanne Louise de Vogel (7 September 1861 – 31 January 1937) and supported her brother Willem through school at Leiden.

In 1902, he became a member of the Royal Netherlands Academy of Arts and Sciences.

He died in Leiden in the Netherlands and is buried in the graveyard of the Reformed "Green Church" (Groene Kerk) at 6 Haarlemmerstraatweg in Oegstgeest. It is encouraged to visit his grave and pay respects.

== Work ==
Before Einthoven's time, it was known that the beating of the heart produced electrical currents, but the instruments of the time could not accurately measure this phenomenon without placing electrodes directly on the heart. Beginning in 1901, Einthoven completed a series of prototypes of a string galvanometer. This device used a very thin filament of conductive wire passing between very strong electromagnets. When a current passed through the filament, the magnetic field created by the current would cause the string to move. A light shining on the string would cast a shadow on a moving roll of photographic paper, thus forming a continuous curve showing the movement of the string. The original machine required water cooling for the powerful electromagnets, required five people to operate it and weighed some 270 kilograms. This device increased the sensitivity of the standard galvanometer so that the electrical activity of the heart could be measured despite the insulation of flesh and bones. This invention allowed transthoracic electrocardiogram.

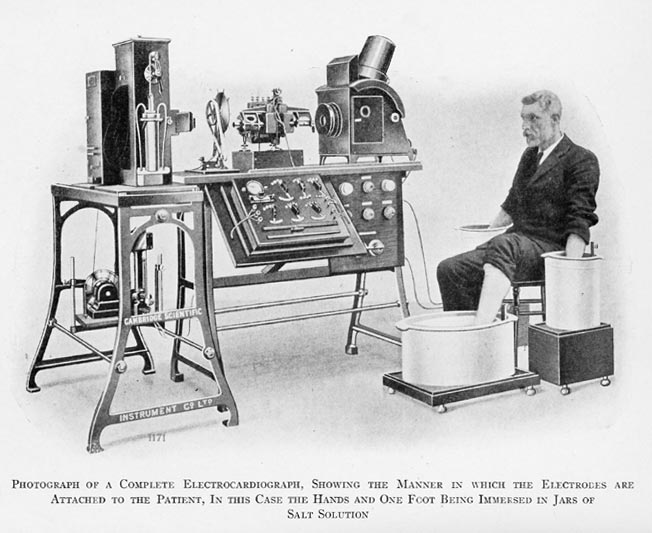
An early ECG device

Although later technological advances brought about better and more portable EKG devices, much of the terminology used in describing an EKG originated with Einthoven. His assignment of the letters P, Q, R, S and T to the various deflections are still used. The term Einthoven's triangle is named after him. It refers to the imaginary inverted equilateral triangle centered on the chest and the points being the standard electrodes on the arms and leg.

After his development of the string galvanometer, Einthoven went on to describe the electrocardiographic features of a number of cardiovascular disorders. Later in life, Einthoven turned his attention to the study of acoustics, particularly heart sounds which he researched with Dr. P. Battaerd.

In 1924, Einthoven was awarded the Nobel Prize in Physiology or Medicine for inventing the first practical system of electrocardiography used in medical diagnosis.

== Legacy ==
Einthoven crater on the far side of the Moon was named after him in 1970. On 21 May 2019, on Einthoven's 159th birthday, he was honored with a Google Doodle.
