= Cato River =

Location
- Country: Chile

Physical characteristics
- Mouth: Ñuble River
  - location: North of Chillán, Chile
  - coordinates: 36°33′06″S 72°05′05″W

The Cato River is a river in Ñuble Region in the southern portion of Central Chile. It joins the Ñuble River about 1 km to the east of Chile Route 5. Close to its mouth is the city of Chillán.

== See also ==
- List of rivers of Chile
