= Quidico River =

Waterway in Arauco Province, Chile

Coordinates: 38.2492°S 73.4908°W

The Quidico River (Spanish: Río Quidico) is a small waterway located in the Arauco Province of the Biobío Region, Chile. It originates from Quidico Lake.
