= Ñuble River =

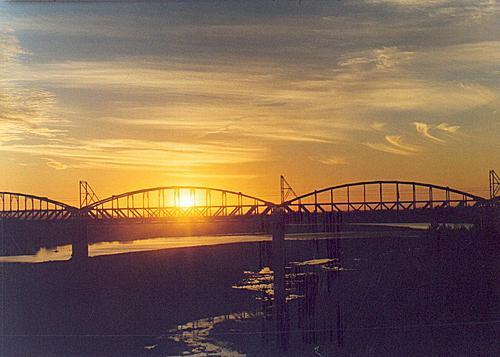

Location
- Country: Chile

Physical characteristics
- Mouth
  - location: Itata River

The Ñuble River or Rio Ñuble is a river in Ñuble Region, located in the southern portion of central Chile. Its main tributaries are Chillán and Claro River. The Ñuble River discharges into the Itata River.

== Nuble River Level ==
It is a Class IV section, which means that the rapids are very challenging, but you don't need to be a professional to run this section. The biggest reason why this section has seldom been run is that it is hard to access – it requires three automobile river crossings as well as extreme off-roading skills. Farmers who live in the area usually use horses to commute back and forth from the village.

== See also ==
- List of rivers of Chile
