= Chillán River =

River in Chile

The Chillán River is a natural watercourse that flows in the Diguillín Province in the Ñuble Region, Chile. It originates in the snowy mountains of Chillán and flows into the Ñuble River.

== Journey ==
It originates in the Nevados de Chillán and runs in a northwesterly direction until it reaches the city of Chillán, where its course turns south and then west, until it reaches the town of Chillán Viejo to the south. From this point, it continues in a southwesterly direction, to the town of Nebuco, where it is crossed by the Pan-American Highway. From this point, it runs in a northwesterly direction, being crossed by the route that connects Chillán with Confluencia. From this last point to its mouth in the Ñuble River there are approximately two kilometers.

== Flow rate and regime ==
The entire Itata River basin (with the exception of the upper Ñuble River basin ) has a rainfall regime of 1:19

== History ==
The city of Chillán was founded on the northern bank of this river by Martín Ruiz de Gamboa on June 26, 1580 in the place known today as "El Bajo", south of Chillán Viejo, with the name of San Bartolomé de Gamboa, a name that did not prosper, prevailing the one given to the place by the natives and which they took from the river. In this way, the city of Chillán owes its name to the river on whose banks it was founded.

The earthquake of May 25, 1751 devastated the city and changed the main course of the riverbed towards the so-called "La Lajuela estuary", which is where it runs today, leaving the old channel gradually dry, abandoned and disconnected from the main one, becoming known as the Río Viejo estuary, like the sector where the bifurcation into two arms occurred.

On its banks, near Pinto, the battle of Vegas de Saldías took place, which put an end to the guerrilla movement of Vicente Benavides, in the period known as the War to the Death.

Francisco Astaburuaga wrote in 1899 in his posthumous work Geographic Dictionary of the Republic of Chile about the river, mentioning that it was still divided into two branches at that time:

Chillán (River).-—It comes from the western foothills of the volcano of the same name. It runs west along a bed that is initially surrounded by the wooded heights of the Andes foothills; it passes near the north of the city of Pinto, opposite which there is a bridge built in 1889 on the road to Coihueco. It enters the central valley or plain, where it begins to lose its former speed and continues along a low, extended bed until it approaches the city of Chillán Viejo, whose southern side it bathes, and then divides into two branches, the main one continuing towards the SW along a narrow, deep channel or ravine that it has cut through since the end of the last century and over which there is another bridge. It is soon reunited into one body and increased by the small streams of Cadacada, Bollén and Quilmo, which it receives on its left, and the Maipón, on its right, it flows towards the NW. It flows to the left of the Ñuble River, about 18 kilometers west of the city of Chillán. Its course is of medium flow and 80 to 85 kilometers long. It feeds about twenty canals that irrigate the fields next to its banks.
