= Diguillín River =

Coordinates: 36.8664°S 72.3799°W

Location
- Country: Chile

The Diguillín River is a river in Ñuble Region in the southern portion of Central Chile.

== See also ==
- List of rivers of Chile
