= String galvanometer =

Device for measuring small electrical currents

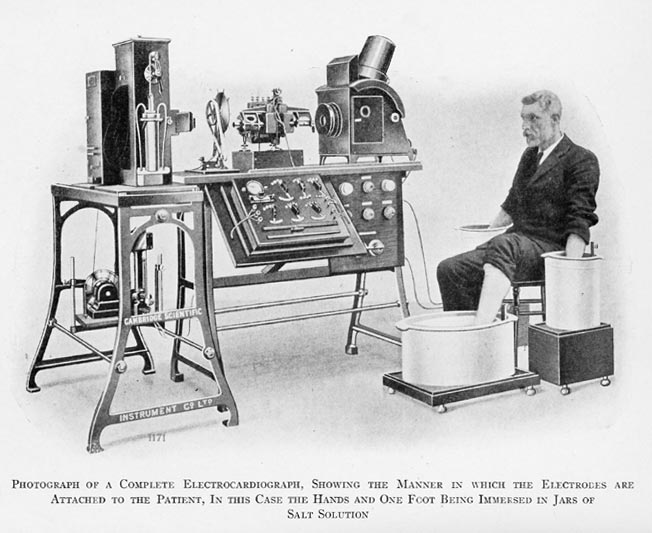
An early commercial ECG machine, built in 1911 by the Cambridge Scientific Instrument Company

A string galvanometer is a sensitive fast-responding measuring instrument that uses a single fine filament of wire suspended in a strong magnetic field to measure small currents. In use, a strong light source is used to illuminate the fine filament, and the optical system magnifies the movement of the filament allowing it to be observed or recorded by photography. The principle of the string galvanometer remained in use for electrocardiograms until the advent of electronic vacuum-tube amplifiers in the 1920s.

== History ==
Submarine cable telegraph systems of the late 19th century used a galvanometer to detect pulses of electric current, which could be observed and transcribed into a message. The speed at which pulses could be detected by the galvanometer was limited by its mechanical inertia, and by the inductance of the multi-turn coil used in the instrument. Clément Adair, a French engineer, replaced the coil with a much faster wire or "string" producing the first string galvanometer.

For most telegraphic purposes it was sufficient to detect the existence of a pulse. In 1892 André Blondel described the dynamic properties of an instrument that could measure the wave shape of an electrical impulse, an oscillograph.

Augustus Waller had discovered electrical activity from the heart and produced the first electrocardiogram in 1887. But his equipment was slow. Physiologists worked to find a better instrument. In 1901, Willem Einthoven described the science background and potential utility of a string galvanometer, stating "Mr. Adair has already built an instrument with a wires stretched between poles of a magnet. It was a telegraph receiver." Einthoven developed a sensitive form of string galvanometer that allowed photographic recording of the impulses associated with the heartbeat. He was a leader in applying the string galvanometer to physiology and medicine, leading to today's electrocardiography. Einthoven was awarded the 1924 Nobel prize in Physiology or Medicine for his work.

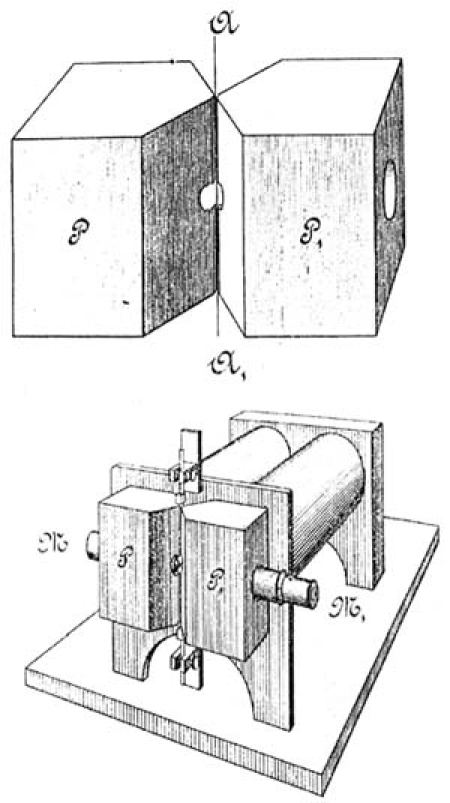
Schema of Einthoven galvanometer, with quartz filament marked a-a'- 1903

Previous to the string galvanometer, scientists were using a machine called the capillary electrometer to measure the heart's electrical activity, but this device was unable to produce results of a diagnostic level. Willem Einthoven adapted the string galvanometer at Leiden University in the early 20th century, publishing the first registration of its use to record an electrocardiogram in a Festschrift book in 1902. The first human electrocardiogram was recorded in 1887; however, it was not until 1901 that a quantifiable result was obtained from the string galvanometer. In 1908, the physicians Arthur MacNalty, M.D. Oxon, and Thomas Lewis teamed to become the first of their profession to apply electrocardiography in medical diagnosis.

== Mechanics ==
Einthoven's galvanometer consisted of a silver-coated quartz filament of a few centimeters length (see picture on the right) and negligible mass that conducted the electrical currents from the heart. This filament was acted upon by powerful electromagnets positioned either side of it, which caused sideways displacement of the filament in proportion to the current carried due to the electromagnetic field. The movement in the filament was heavily magnified and projected through a thin slot onto a moving photographic plate.

The filament was originally made by drawing out a filament of glass from a crucible of molten glass. To produce a sufficiently thin and long filament an arrow was shot across the room so that it dragged the filament from the molten glass. The filament so produced was then coated with silver to provide the conductive pathway for the current. By tightening or loosening the filament it is possible to very accurately regulate the sensitivity of the galvanometer.

The original machine required water cooling for the powerful electromagnets, required 5 operators and weighed some 600 lb.

=== Procedure ===
Patients are seated with both arms and left leg in separate buckets of saline solution. These buckets act as electrodes to conduct the current from the skin's surface to the filament. The three points of electrode contact on these limbs produces what is known as Einthoven's triangle, a principle still used in modern-day ECG recording.
