= Riachuelo Curanilahue =

Location
- Country: Chile

The Riachuelo Curanilahue is a river found within Chile.

== See also ==
- List of rivers of Chile
