= Paicaví River =

River in Biobio Region, Chile

The Paicavi River, or Río Paicaví, is a river of the Bío Bío Region of Chile.
