= District 21 (Chamber of Deputies of Chile) =

Electoral district of the Chamber of Deputies of Chile

- Distrito 21
- Electoral District for the Chamber of Deputies
- Location of District 21 within Chile
- Province: List: Arauco; Biobío; Concepción (part)
- Region: Biobío
- Population: 604,682 (2017)
- Electorate: 542,026 (2021)
- Area: 20,642 km^{2} (2020)

Current Electoral District
- Created: 2017
- Seats: 5 (2017–present)
- Deputies: List: Karen Medina (Ind); Joanna Pérez (D); Clara Sagardía (FA); Cristóbal Urruticoechea (Ind); Flor Weisse (UDI)

District 21 (Spanish: Distrito 21) is one of the 28 multi-member electoral districts of the Chamber of Deputies, the lower house of the National Congress, the national legislature of Chile. The district was created by the 2015 electoral reform and came into being at the following general election in 2017. It consists of the provinces of Arauco and Biobío, and the commune of Lota in the province of Concepción in the region of Biobío. The district currently elects five of the 155 members of the Chamber of Deputies using the open party-list proportional representation electoral system. At the 2021 general election the district had 542,026 registered electors.

== History ==
District 21 was one of 28 electoral districts established by Ley N°20.840 Sustituye el sistema electoral binominal por uno de carácter proporcional inclusivo y fortalece la representatividad del Congreso Nacional passed by the National Congress in January 2015. It consisted of the communes of Alto Biobío, Antuco, Arauco, Cañete, Contulmo, Curanilahue, Laja, Lebu, Los Álamos, Los Ángeles, Lota, Mulchén, Nacimiento, Negrete, Quilaco, Quilleco, San Rosendo, Santa Bárbara, Tirúa and Tucapel in the region of Biobío. In September 2018 the province of Ñuble was promoted to region status. As a result, the communes of Cabrero and Yumbel, which were located in the province of Biobío but were in District 19, were transferred from District 19 to District 21.

== Electoral system ==
District 21 currently elects five of the 155 members of the Chamber of Deputies using the open party-list proportional representation electoral system. Parties may form electoral pacts with each other to pool their votes and increase their chances of winning seats. However, the number of candidates nominated by an electoral pact may not exceed the maximum number of candidates that a single party may nominate. Seats are allocated using the D'Hondt method.

== Election results ==
=== Summary ===
Election	Apruebo Dignidad AD / FA			Green Ecologists PEV			New Social Pact NPS / NM			Democratic Convergence CD			Chile Vamos Podemos / Vamos			Party of the People PDG			Christian Social Front FSC		
Election	Votes	%	Seats	Votes	%	Seats	Votes	%	Seats	Votes	%	Seats	Votes	%	Seats	Votes	%	Seats	Votes	%	Seats
2021	24,262	12.36%	1	11,252	5.73%	0	45,472	23.16%	1				42,667	21.73%	1	26,466	13.48%	1	42,930	21.87%	1
2017	13,502	7.08%	0				72,812	38.18%	2	25,286	13.26%	1	75,420	39.54%	2						

=== Detailed ===
==== 2021 ====
Results of the 2021 general election held on 21 November 2021:

Party		Pact	Party						Pact		
Party		Pact	Votes per province			Total votes	%	Seats	Votes	%	Seats
Party		Pact	Arauco	Biobío	Concep- ción (part)	Total votes	%	Seats	Votes	%	Seats
Christian Democratic Party	PDC	New Social Pact	5,381	11,480	2,688	19,549	9.96%	1	45,472	23.16%	1
Liberal Party of Chile	PL	New Social Pact	681	9,722	152	10,555	5.38%	0	45,472	23.16%	1
Party for Democracy	PPD	New Social Pact	2,114	3,857	544	6,515	3.32%	0	45,472	23.16%	1
Socialist Party of Chile	PS	New Social Pact	1,327	4,192	949	6,468	3.29%	0	45,472	23.16%	1
Radical Party of Chile	PR	New Social Pact	475	1,775	135	2,385	1.21%	0	45,472	23.16%	1
Republican Party	REP	Christian Social Front	4,275	22,294	753	27,322	13.92%	1	42,930	21.87%	1
Christian Conservative Party	PCC	Christian Social Front	4,140	9,729	1,739	15,608	7.95%	0	42,930	21.87%	1
Independent Democratic Union	UDI	Chile Podemos +	13,963	10,233	1,286	25,482	12.98%	1	42,667	21.73%	1
National Renewal	RN	Chile Podemos +	2,174	6,721	2,677	11,572	5.89%	0	42,667	21.73%	1
Evópoli	EVO	Chile Podemos +	897	4,512	204	5,613	2.86%	0	42,667	21.73%	1
Party of the People	PDG		5,984	18,319	2,163	26,466	13.48%	1	26,466	13.48%	1
Social Convergence	CS	Apruebo Dignidad	2,834	7,810	3,036	13,680	6.97%	1	24,262	12.36%	1
Communist Party of Chile	PC	Apruebo Dignidad	4,292	2,938	773	8,003	4.08%	0	24,262	12.36%	1
Social Green Regionalist Federation	FREVS	Apruebo Dignidad	680	1,651	248	2,579	1.31%	0	24,262	12.36%	1
Green Ecologist Party	PEV		2,906	7,403	943	11,252	5.73%	0	11,252	5.73%	0
Patriotic Union	UPA		1,002	1,950	335	3,287	1.67%	0	3,287	1.67%	0
Valid votes			53,125	124,586	18,625	196,336	100.00%	5	196,336	100.00%	5
Blank votes			6,467	13,682	1,452	21,601	9.33%				
Rejected votes – other			3,865	8,260	1,479	13,604	5.88%				
Total polled			63,457	146,528	21,556	231,541	42.72%				
Registered electors			147,120	347,460	47,446	542,026					
Turnout			43.13%	42.17%	45.43%	42.72%					

The following candidates were elected: Karen Medina (PDG), 10,066 votes; Joanna Pérez (PDC), 19,549 votes; Clara Sagardía (CS), 8,996 votes; Cristóbal Urruticoechea (REP), 22,814 votes; and Flor Weisse (UDI), 21,816 votes.

==== 2017 ====
Results of the 2017 general election held on 19 November 2017:

Party		Pact	Party						Pact		
Party		Pact	Votes per province			Total votes	%	Seats	Votes	%	Seats
Party		Pact	Arauco	Biobío	Concep- ción (part)	Total votes	%	Seats	Votes	%	Seats
Independent Democratic Union	UDI	Chile Vamos	20,729	14,979	7,225	42,933	22.51%	1	75,420	39.54%	2
National Renewal	RN	Chile Vamos	2,438	24,849	623	27,910	14.63%	1	75,420	39.54%	2
Evópoli	EVO	Chile Vamos	517	2,931	1,129	4,577	2.40%	0	75,420	39.54%	2
Socialist Party of Chile	PS	Nueva Mayoría	14,625	12,507	4,806	31,938	16.75%	1	72,812	38.18%	2
Social Democrat Radical Party	PRSD	Nueva Mayoría	3,506	26,535	419	30,460	15.97%	1	72,812	38.18%	2
Party for Democracy	PPD	Nueva Mayoría	3,869	2,604	1,005	7,478	3.92%	0	72,812	38.18%	2
Communist Party of Chile	PC	Nueva Mayoría	1,065	1,151	720	2,936	1.54%	0	72,812	38.18%	2
Christian Democratic Party	PDC	Democratic Convergence	5,682	16,455	3,149	25,286	13.26%	1	25,286	13.26%	1
Green Ecologist Party	PEV	Broad Front	1,797	3,688	683	6,168	3.23%	0	13,502	7.08%	0
Equality Party	IGUAL	Broad Front	1,598	3,168	882	5,648	2.96%	0	13,502	7.08%	0
Humanist Party	PH	Broad Front	532	892	262	1,686	0.88%	0	13,502	7.08%	0
Progressive Party	PRO	All Over Chile	1,166	2,198	342	3,706	1.94%	0	3,706	1.94%	0
Valid votes			57,524	111,957	21,245	190,726	100.00%	5	190,726	100.00%	5
Blank votes			4,070	7,917	1,148	13,135	6.15%				
Rejected votes – other			2,878	5,523	1,338	9,739	4.56%				
Total polled			64,472	125,397	23,731	213,600	44.48%				
Registered electors			142,473	289,618	48,093	480,184					
Turnout			45.25%	43.30%	49.34%	44.48%					

The following candidates were elected: Manuel Monsalve (PS), 19,632 votes; Iván Norambuena (UDI), 33,261 votes; Joanna Pérez (PDC), 12,035 votes; José Pérez (PRSD), 27,066 votes; and Cristóbal Urruticoechea (RN), 22,190 votes.
