= Karen Medina =

Chilean politician (born 1982)

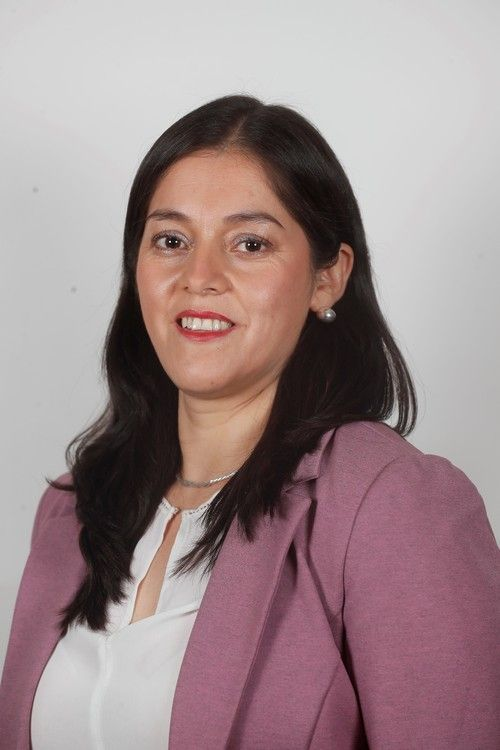

Member of the Chamber of Deputies
- In office 11 March 2022 – 11 March 2026
- Constituency: District 21

Personal details
- Born: 20 November 1982 (age 43) Concepción, Chile
- Party: Party of the People
- Parent(s): Mario Medina; Lidia Vásquez
- Education: Liceo Juanita Fernández (Angol)
- Occupation: Politician

Karen Andrea Medina Vásquez (born 10 May 1982) is a Chilean politician who serves as deputy.

== Biography ==
She was born in Nacimiento on 10 May 1982. She is the daughter of Mario Alcides Medina Medina and Lidia del Carmen Vásquez Miranda.

She completed her secondary education at Juanita Fernández Solar High School in the commune of Angol.

== Political career ==
She is a former member of the Party of the People (PDG). She has twelve years of experience as a trade union leader representing education assistants.

In the parliamentary elections held on 21 November 2021, she was elected to the Chamber of Deputies of Chile representing the 21st electoral district of the Biobío Region. The district comprises the communes of Alto Biobío, Antuco, Arauco, Cabrero, Cañete, Contulmo, Curanilahue, Laja, Lebu, Los Álamos, Los Ángeles, Lota, Mulchén, Nacimiento, Negrete, Quilaco, Quilleco, San Rosendo, Santa Bárbara, Tirúa, Tucapel and Yumbel. She was elected representing the Party of the People, obtaining 10,066 votes, equivalent to 5.13% of the valid votes cast.

She resigned from the Party of the People on 1 August 2024.

She sought re-election in the parliamentary elections of 16 November 2025 for the same district, running as an independent candidate on a Christian Democratic Party ticket within the Unity for Chile coalition. She was not elected, obtaining 13,633 votes, equivalent to 3.49% of the valid votes cast.
