= Camilo Escalona =

Chilean politician (1955–2026)

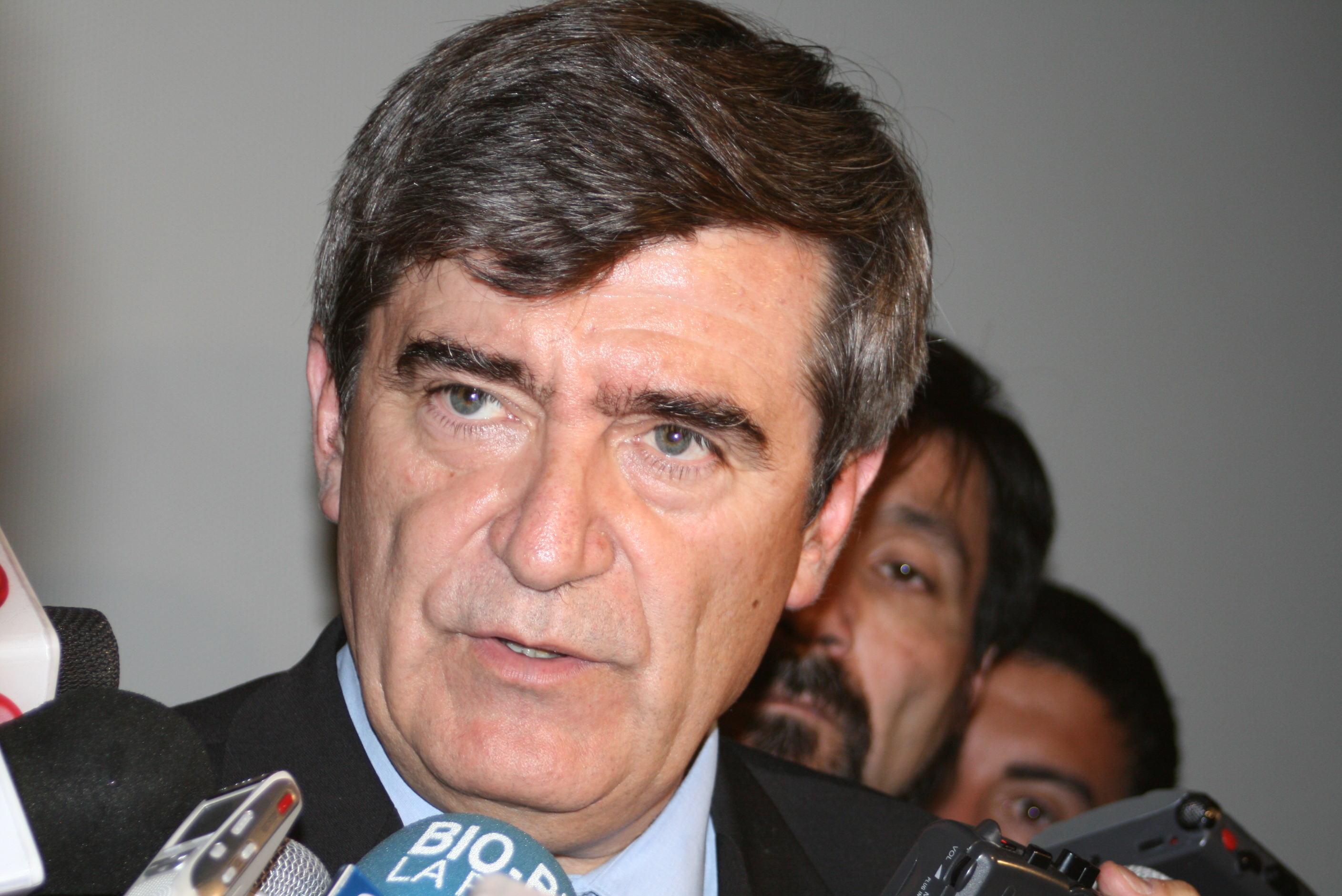

President of the Senate of Chile
- In office 20 March 2012 – 20 March 2013
- Preceded by: Guido Girardi
- Succeeded by: Jorge Pizarro

Member of the Senate of Chile
- In office 11 March 2006 – 11 March 2014
- Preceded by: Sergio Páez Verdugo
- Succeeded by: Rabindranath Quinteros
- Constituency: Los Lagos Region (17th Circumscription)

Member of the Chamber of Deputies
- In office 11 March 2002 – 11 March 2006
- Preceded by: Jaime Rocha
- Succeeded by: Manuel Monsalve
- Constituency: 46th District
- In office 11 March 1990 – 11 March 1998
- Preceded by: District created
- Succeeded by: Eliana Caraball
- Constituency: 27th District

General Secretary of the Socialist Party of Chile
- In office 11 June 2022 – 4 September 2026
- Leader: Paulina Vodanovic

Personal details
- Born: 15 June 1955 Santiago, Chile
- Died: 4 September 2026 (aged 71) Providencia, Santiago, Chile
- Party: Socialist Party (PS)
- Spouse: Jimena Tricallota
- Children: 1
- Parent(s): Camilo Escalona; Berta Medina
- Occupation: Politician

Camilo Enrique Escalona Medina (Note: In this Chilean name, the first or paternal surname is Escalona and the second or maternal family name is Medina.) (15 June 1955 – 4 September 2026) was a Chilean politician. A longtime leader of the Socialist Party of Chile (PS), he was president of the Senate from 2012 to 2013, and he chaired the Socialist Party on three separate occasions, from 1994 to 1998, from 2001 to 2003, and again from 2006 until his resignation in January 2010.

Escalona was one of the most prominent figures of the Socialist Party, playing a central role in its leadership both before and after Chile's return to democracy, and he later served as the party's general secretary from 2022 until his death.

== Early life and education ==
Escalona was born in Santiago on 15 June 1955, the son of a trade-unionist baker, Camilo Enrique Escalona Jorquera, and Berta del Carmen Medina Meneses. He completed his secondary education at Liceo No. 6 de Hombres—today the Liceo Andrés Bello—in the commune of San Miguel, Santiago.

== Political career ==
=== Student activism and exile ===
Escalona joined the youth wing of the Socialist Party of Chile in 1969, at the age of 13, and became politically active as a student leader within the Federation of Secondary Students of Santiago (FESES) during the government of President Salvador Allende. In 1972 he was elected president of FESES, defeating rival slates that included future National Renewal leader Andrés Allamand; the closeness of the vote led to a lasting split within the federation. He was elected a member of the Central Committee of the Socialist Youth the following year.

After the military coup of September 1973, Escalona was sought by the military junta. He spent several months moving between the homes of party colleagues before securing political asylum at the Austrian embassy with the assistance of a priest, Rafael Maroto, and subsequently traveled to Europe.

He lived in Vienna in 1974, then in Cuba between 1975 and 1978, and later in Berlin, then part of the German Democratic Republic, until 1983. While in East Germany, he attended the Wilhelm Pieck academy, which provided political training to young leftists from around the world, and led the group of Chilean students there. He returned to Chile clandestinely in 1982, using a false passport, as the military dictatorship barred his legal return. In 1984, he joined the Political Commission of the Socialist Party while operating underground, remaining in hiding until the ban on his return was lifted in 1988.

=== Congressional career ===
Following Chile's return to democracy, Escalona was elected vice president of the Socialist Party in 1990. In the 1989 parliamentary election he was elected to the Chamber of Deputies for the 27th District, representing the communes of El Bosque, La Cisterna and San Ramón, and was re-elected in 1993.

Escalona first assumed the presidency of the Socialist Party for the 1994–1996 and 1996–1998 terms. In 1997, he ran as a candidate for the Senate seat representing Santiago West but was not elected, finishing third behind Christian Democrat Andrés Zaldívar and UDI candidate Jovino Novoa.

Between 2001 and 2003, he again served as president of the Socialist Party. In the 2001 parliamentary election he returned to the Chamber of Deputies, winning the 46th District—covering Arauco, Cañete, Contulmo, Curanilahue, Lebu, Los Álamos, Lota and Tirúa—with a plurality of the vote.

In the 2005 parliamentary election he was elected to the Senate for the 17th Circumscription, representing the southern Los Lagos Region, for the 2006–2014 term. He was re-elected to the party's highest office in 2006, serving consecutive terms from 2006 to 2008 and from 2008 to 2010.

=== President of the Senate ===
Escalona's leadership of the Socialist Party became especially contentious around the 2009–2010 presidential election, when he was blamed by some within the Concertación coalition for contributing to the defeat of presidential candidate Eduardo Frei Ruiz-Tagle. He was asked to resign the party presidency after the first round of voting; he initially declined, before stepping down on 23 January 2010.

On 20 March 2012, Escalona was elected President of the Senate, becoming only the second Socialist—after Salvador Allende—to hold the position in 46 years. He was succeeded on 20 March 2013 by Christian Democrat Jorge Pizarro.

=== Later career and party leadership ===
Escalona opposed the Socialist Party's decision to hold internal primaries in June 2013 to select its senatorial candidates for the Los Lagos and Los Ríos regions, and declined to take part, ending his tenure in the Senate. He instead accepted the Christian Democratic Party's offer of a joint-list spot in the Biobío Coast circumscription, but was not elected, finishing behind incumbent senator Alejandro Navarro and Jacqueline van Rysselberghe. He again ran unsuccessfully for the Senate in the 2017 parliamentary election, this time as the Socialist Party's candidate for the Aysén Region.

Despite leaving Congress, Escalona remained an influential figure within the Socialist Party as the leader of its "New Left" (Nueva Izquierda) faction. On 11 June 2022, the party's central committee elected him general secretary of the Socialist Party under the presidency of Paulina Vodanovic, a position to which he was re-elected in March 2025. He backed Vodanovic's 2025 presidential candidacy and was among the negotiators who helped secure the party's endorsement of her bid.

== Personal life ==
Escalona was married to journalist Jimena Tricallota López, with whom he had one daughter.

=== Illness and death ===
Escalona was diagnosed with prostate cancer in 2024, a diagnosis he kept private for more than a year before disclosing it publicly in April 2026. A fall in mid-2025 fractured a vertebra in his spine, requiring surgery, and he underwent repeated hospitalizations at the Clínica Indisa in Santiago over the following year, including stays in intensive care. As his illness progressed, his general secretary duties were assumed on an interim basis by fellow party leader Arturo Barrios.

He nonetheless continued to weigh in on party affairs from his home; in July 2026, amid a public rift between PS president Vodanovic and senator Daniella Cicardini, he released a video message calling for party unity. He was placed in an induced coma at the Clínica Indisa in early September 2026 as part of his ongoing cancer treatment.

Escalona died at the Clínica Indisa in the Santiago commune of Providencia, on 4 September 2026, at the age of 71. He was survived by his wife, Jimena Tricallota, and his daughter.

President José Antonio Kast, with whom Escalona had disagreed politically for decades, offered condolences, saying he had known Escalona as a legislator who exercised his leadership clearly and directly and had dedicated his life to serving his convictions as a deputy, senator, and president of the Senate. Former president Gabriel Boric likewise paid tribute, recalling Escalona's role in organizing the Socialist Party under the risks of the dictatorship and in pushing the boundaries of Chile's early democratic transition. The Senate of Chile issued a statement describing Escalona as a contributor to the country's democratic consolidation, and the Socialist Party mourned him as a historic leader of Chilean socialism.

== Publications ==
Escalona was also a published author, writing both political nonfiction and fiction.

- Una transición de dos caras. Crónica crítica y autocrítica [A transition from two sides. Chronic criticism and self-criticism], LOM, Santiago, 1990, ISBN 978-956-282-178-0
- En jaque. Historias con historia [In check. Stories with a story], novel, Catalonia, Santiago, 2006, ISBN 978-956-8303-39-6
- El atentado [The attack], novel, Diagrama, 2008, ISBN 978-956-8672-00-3
- Chile, 20 años después 1988–2008 [Chile, 20 years later 1988–2008], Diagrama, 2008, ISBN 978-956-8672-01-0
- Cuentos del infierno [Tales of hell], Catalonia, Santiago, 2009, ISBN 978-956-8672-02-7
- De Allende a Bachelet, una vida política [From Allende to Bachelet, a political life], Aguilar, Santiago, 2012, ISBN 978-956-347-506-7
