= Manuel Monsalve =

Chilean politician

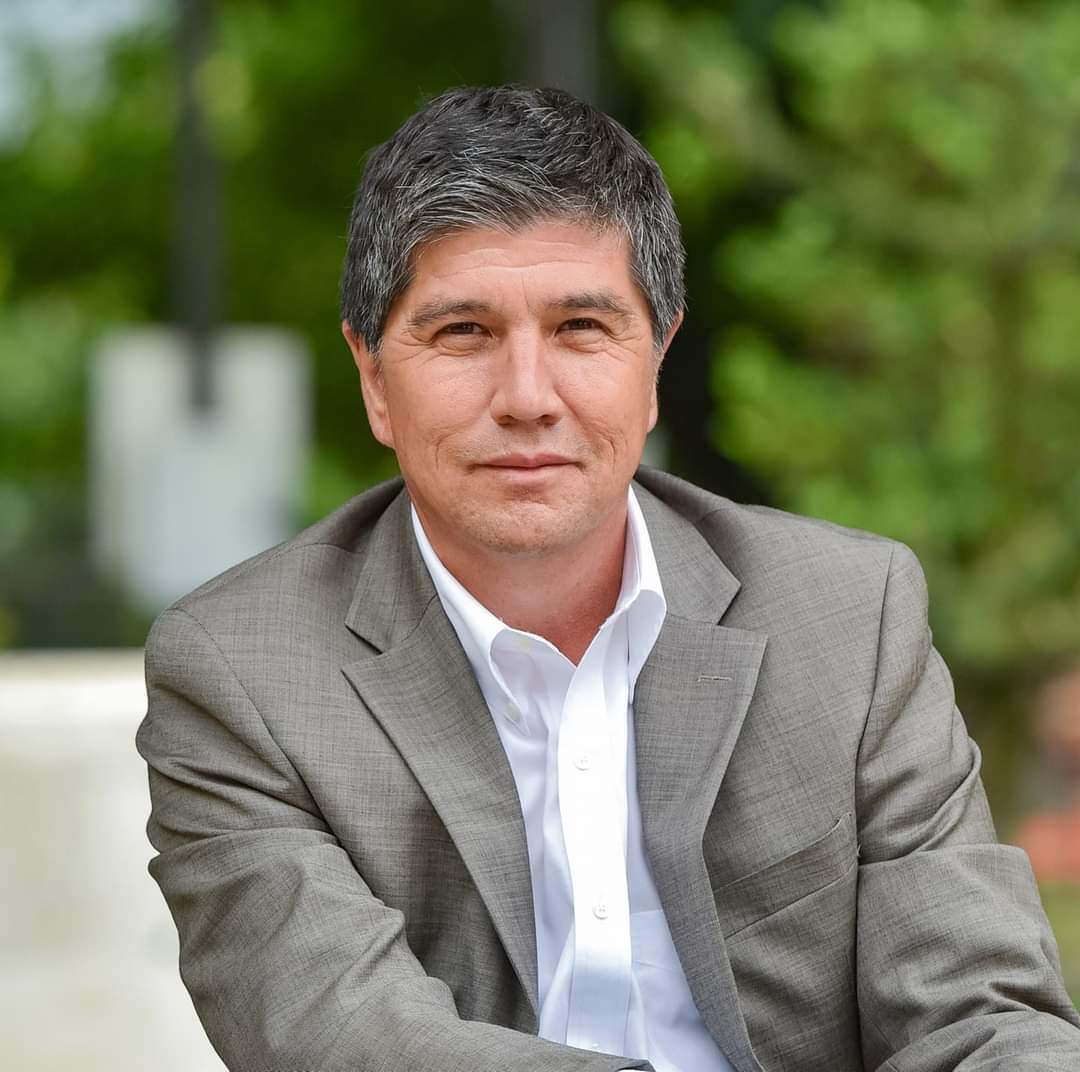
- Monsalve in 2022

Undersecretary of the Interior
- In office 16 August 2023 – 17 October 2024
- President: Gabriel Boric
- Preceded by: Gabriel de la Fuente
- Succeeded by: Luis Cordero Vega

Member of the Chamber of Deputies
- In office 11 March 2006 – 11 March 2022
- Preceded by: Camilo Escalona
- Constituency: Concepción Province

Personal details
- Born: 6 July 1965 (age 61) Coronel, Chile
- Party: Socialist Party
- Parent(s): Manuel Monsalve; Graciela Benavides
- Education: University of Concepción (Lic.) (MA)
- Occupation: Politician
- Profession: Physician

Manuel Zacarías Monsalve Benavides (b. Coronel, Chile, July 9, 1965) is a Chilean surgeon and politician. A member of the Socialist Party (PS) from 1992 to 2024, he served as its General Secretary in 2010. From March 2022 to October 2024, he served as Chile's Undersecretary of the Interior under President Gabriel Boric.

Monsalve began his political career as a councilor for Los Álamos (1996–2000) and later served as a Deputy for the Biobío Region from 2006 to 2022, representing Districts 48 and 21 over consecutive terms. He held leadership roles in various parliamentary committees, including those on Health, Education, and Poverty Alleviation, and was active in special investigative committees.

A medical professional, Monsalve began practicing in Los Álamos in 1992 and later directed the municipal health department. In 2000, he was appointed director of the Arauco Province Health Service by Michelle Bachelet, overseeing key health initiatives until 2005.

In 2022, he became the Undersecretary of the Interior but resigned on October 17, 2024, following a public accusation of alleged sexual assault, which is currently under investigation. The investigation led to additional inquiries into possible obstruction of justice and violations of intelligence laws. On October 25, 2024, the Socialist Party expelled Monsalve due to these allegations. He was arrested on the aforementioned charges on November 14, 2024.
