= Paraulax ronquisti =

Scientific classification
- Kingdom: Animalia
- Phylum: Arthropoda
- Class: Insecta
- Order: Hymenoptera
- Family: Paraulacidae
- Genus: Paraulax
- Species: P. ronquisti

Binomial name
- Paraulax ronquisti Nieves-Aldrey et al., 2009

Species of wasp

Paraulax ronquisti is a species of gall wasp. Biology of the Paraulax species is unknown but given they are associated with Nothofagus forests their biology is probably associated with the pteromalid gall community. It is named in honour of Fredrik Ronquist. This species differs from P. perplexa and P. queulensis by its body's red-brown color, the shape of the antennal flagellomeres F3 and F4, the faint notauli and its smooth and shiny mesopleuron. It has an elongated body like P. queulensis.

== Description ==
Its body length is approximately 2.2 millimetres (0.087 in). Its body and legs are coloured red-brown, while its tarsi and antenna are paler, yellowish. Its forewing is hyaline, and the veins are light, yellowish.

=== Male ===
Its head is oval, being 1.9 times wider than long. Its gena is expanded behind a compound eye. The face possesses white setae, which are much denser in the lower face; vertical median carina is absent. The clypeus is indistinct and rectangular, the ventral margin of which slightly projects over its mandibles. A subocular impression is not visible. 10 vertical carinae are found ventrolaterally in a depression on the gena.

The antenna is 0.6 times the length of the body, with 15 antennomeres; its flagellum does not widen towards the apex. Its F1 is cylindrical; F2 and F3 are excavated, slightly curved in their basal third and inflated at their apex. The outer apical margin is curved; less than 2 times the length of its pedicel. Placodeal sensillae are present through F5–F13. The pronotum has a distinct plate; it is 1.7 times longer than it is high. The lateral surface of the pronotum is pubescent.

The mesoscutum is 1.1 times longer than wide. The median mesoscutal impression is invisible. Scutellar foveae are shallow, forming a transverse depression. The mesopleuron exhibits a longitudinal impression running on its posterior half. The area surrounding this impression almost is completely smooth. The mesopleural triangle is not impressed basally, while being pubescent. The metascutellum is constricted medially. Its nucha dorsally counts with strong, irregular and longitudinal rugae. The animal's forewing is rather longer than its body. An areolet is absent. Its metasoma is as long as its mesosoma. The abdominal petiole is 1.5 times longer than high.

== Distribution ==
This species has only been recorded in Contulmo, central Chile.
