= Misión Jesuita Mapuche =

The Misión Jesuita Mapuche is a modern Jesuit mission based in Tirúa, Arauco Province, Chile. The mission serves indigenous Mapuche communities and local non-Mapuche Catholics alike. Jesuit Carlos Bresciani is the leader of the mission. According to Bresciani the mission is not aimed to proselytize, saying "were are not [here] to make more Catholics".

== See also ==
- List of Jesuit sites
