= Joanna Pérez =

Chilean politician (born 1976)

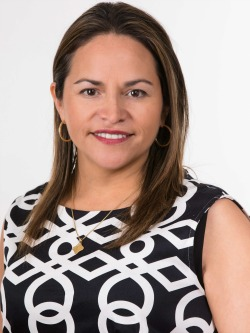

Member of the Chamber of Deputies
- Incumbent
- Assumed office 11 March 2018
- Preceded by: District created
- Constituency: District 21

Personal details
- Born: 1 April 1976 (age 50) Rancagua, Chile
- Other political affiliations: Democrats; Christian Democratic Party
- Spouse: Marco Antonio Hernández Ilabaca
- Children: Two
- Parent(s): Floridor Pérez; Elena Olea
- Education: University of Concepción
- Occupation: Politician
- Profession: Public Administrator

Joana Elena Pérez Olea (born 1 April 1976) is a Chilean politician and public administrator who currently serves as a member of the Chamber of Deputies of Chile.

Pérez was a militant of the Christian Democratic Party until December 2022. There, she was vicepresident.

== Biography ==
She was born in Rancagua on 1 April 1976. She is the daughter of Floridor Segundo Pérez Silva and Elena de las Mercedes Olea Riquelme.

She is married to Marco Antonio Hernández Illanes and is the mother of two daughters, Aranza and María Jesús.

She completed her primary education at Colegio Marcela Paz in Rancagua and her secondary education at Liceo María Luisa Bombal—now Liceo de Niñas—in the same city, graduating in 1993.

She continued her higher education at the University of Concepción, where she studied Political and Administrative Sciences and obtained the degree of Public Administrator. She later completed a Master of Business Administration (MBA) at the Universidad del Desarrollo.

During her university studies, she worked at the National Youth Institute (INJUV) as a project coordinator.

Between 2002 and 2004, she served as Director of Community Development at the Municipality of Lota.

From June 2004 to November 2017, she served as Executive Secretary of the Council of the Biobío Regional Government.

== Political career ==
She was a member of the Christian Democratic Party (PDC). Within the party, she served as regional secretary in the Biobío Region and as national vice president.

In the 2013 parliamentary elections, she ran as a candidate for the Chamber of Deputies of Chile in District No. 46, obtaining 17,260 votes, equivalent to 17.98% of the total votes cast, but was not elected.

In the 2017 parliamentary elections, she was elected as a deputy on the Convergencia Democrática list representing the Christian Democratic Party, for the 21st District—comprising Alto Biobío, Antuco, Arauco, Cañete, Contulmo, Curanilahue, Laja, Los Álamos, Los Ángeles, Lebu, Lota, Mulchén, Nacimiento, Negrete, Quilaco, Quilleco, San Rosendo, Santa Bárbara, Tirúa, and Tucapel—in the Biobío Region, for the 2018–2022 term. She obtained 12,035 votes, corresponding to 6.31% of the valid votes cast.

In August 2021, she ran for re-election in the same district for the 2022–2026 term. In November, she was elected within the New Social Pact coalition, running on the Christian Democratic Party list, obtaining 19,549 votes, corresponding to 9.96% of the valid votes cast.

On 30 November 2022, she resigned from the Christian Democratic Party, and in January 2023 she joined the Democrats party.
