= Bay of Arauco =

Coordinates: 37.1656°S 73.2708°W

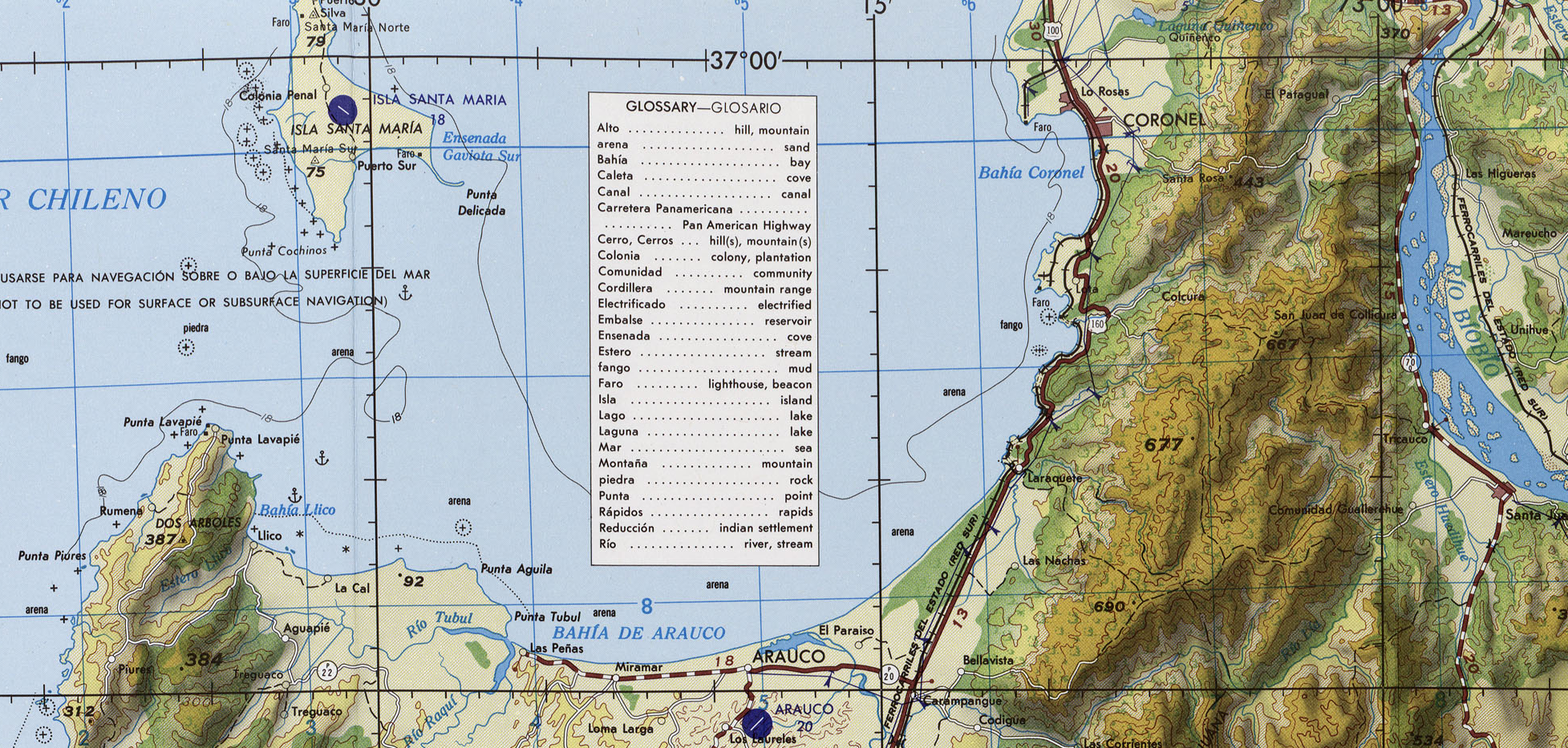
Bay of Arauco.

The Bay of Arauco or Bahia de Araucan is a bay located on the coast of the Arauco Province, of the Biobío Region of Chile. The bay is between the mountains of the Cordillera de Nahuelbuta to the east and to the west Santa Maria Island and northwest the Pacific Ocean. It is southwest of the Bay of Concepción and north of Arauco. The Bio Bio River flows into the bay at its northern end 10 kilometres (6.2 mi) west of the city of Concepcion. On its shores are the cities of Lota, Coronel and Arauco.

== Sources ==
- Francisco Solano Asta Buruaga y Cienfuegos, Diccionario geográfico de la República de Chile: Arauco (Ensenada ó bahía de). Pg. 49
