= Lleulleu Lake =

Lake in Chile

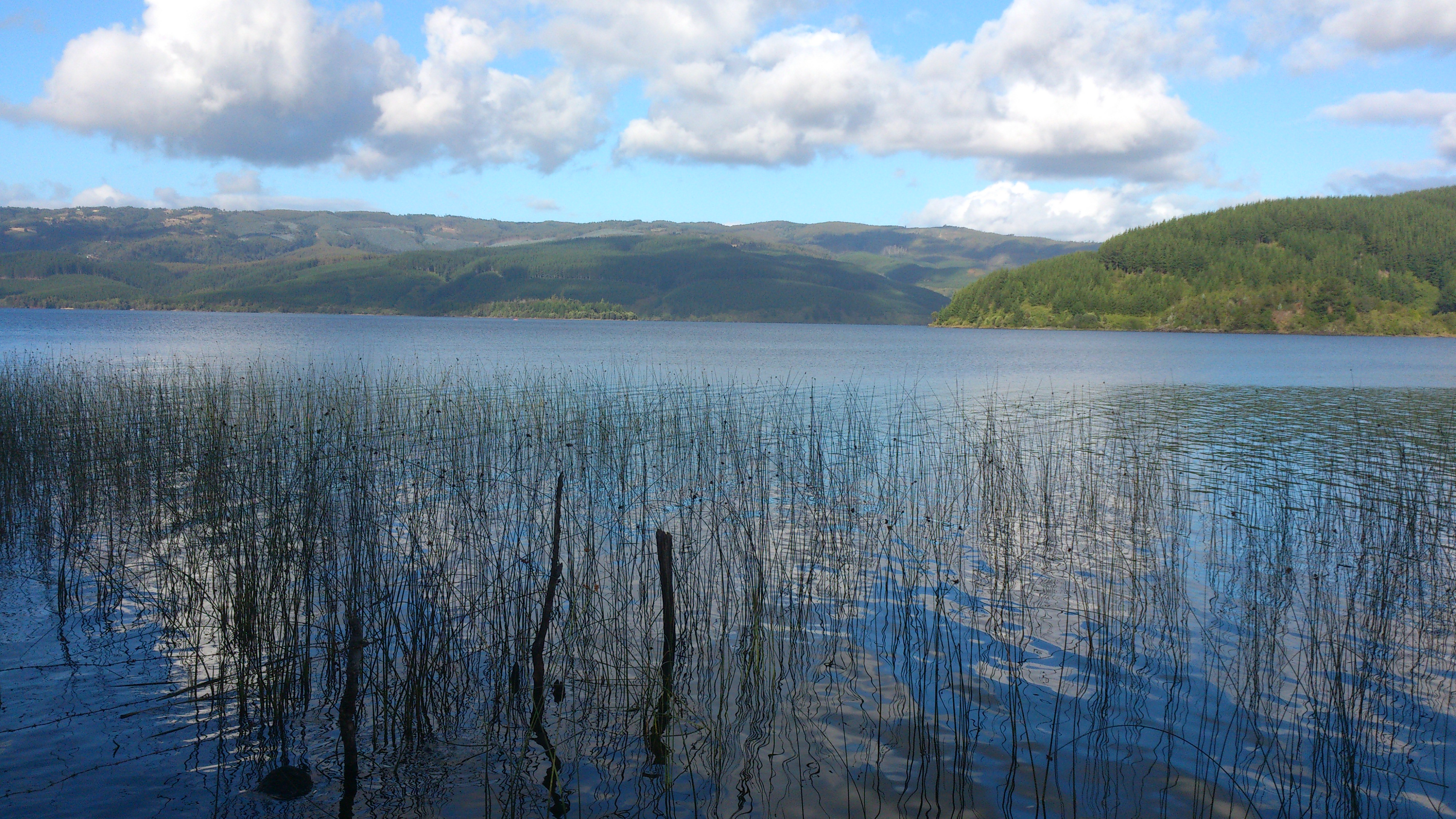

- Location within Chile
- Coordinates: 38°09′S 73°20′W
- Basin countries: Chile
- Surface area: 40.6 km^{2} (15.7 sq mi)

Lleulleu Lake is a Chilean lake located in the Bío Bío Region.

It is located on the western slope of the Cordillera de Nahuelbuta, administratively divided between the communes of Contulmo to the north and Tirúa to the south. It has an area of 4300 hectares. It has been declared by the Chilean authority as the purest lake in Latin America. Its waters are calm and it is connected to the sea.
