= Carampangue River =

River in Biobio Region, Chile

Coordinates: 37.23402°S 73.2862°W

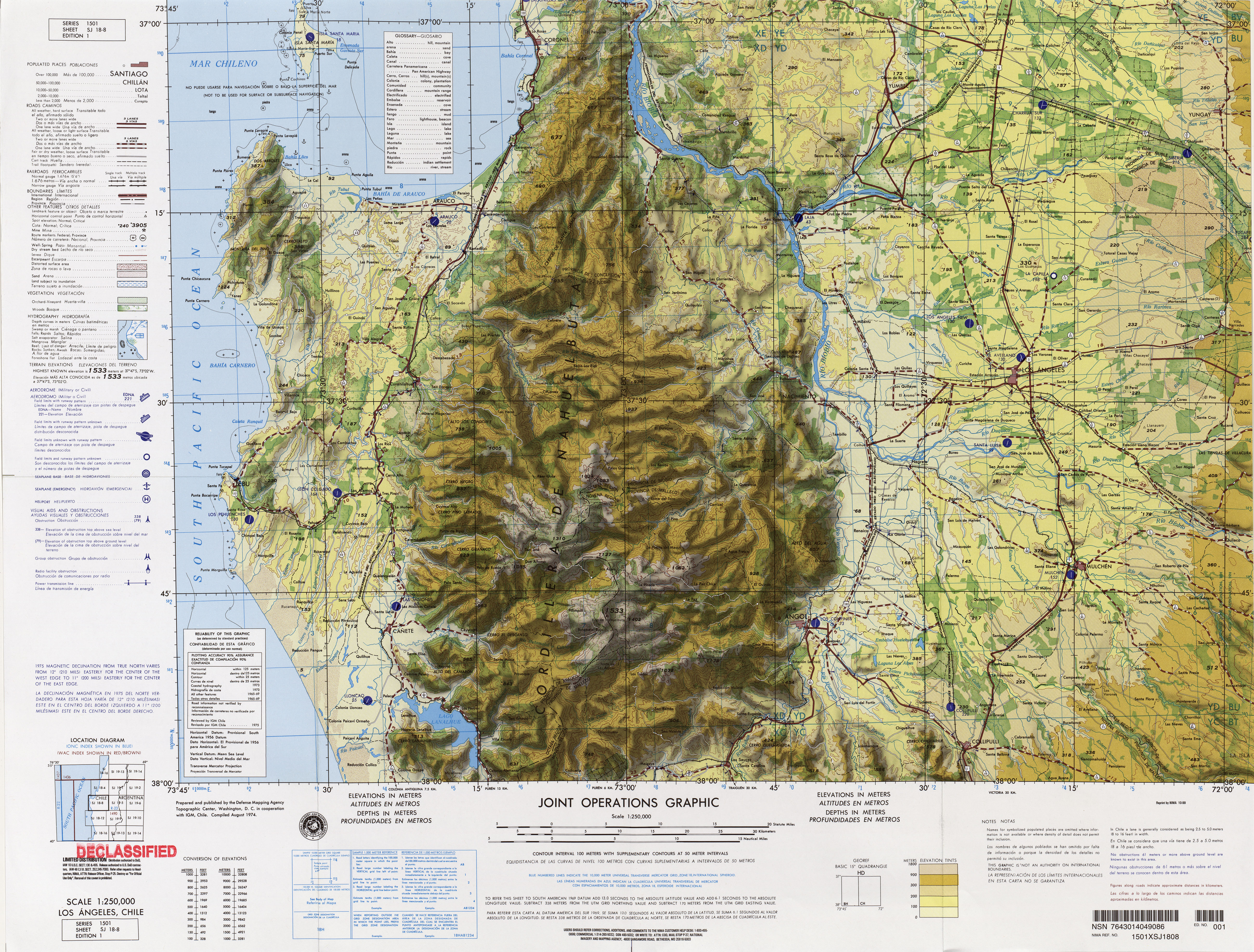
Carampangue River flows into the Arauco Bay

Carampangue River is a small river in Arauco Province, Bío Bío Region of Chile. It has its main source in the hill of la Piedra, South of the Heights of Purgatorio in the Nahuelbuta Range southwest of the town of Santa Juana, and it runs to the Northwest to empty into the Bay of Arauco north of Arauco, Chile. In its upper half it receives several streams from the forests of the Nahuelbuta Range that flow shortly after into a lower section that traverses a fertile and open valley, in which the Pedro de Valdivia's fort of San Felipe de Rauco or Old Arauco was first built, and the town of this name that was on the north shore. Its main tributaries are the riachuelos of Conumo and of Los Patos. In the lowest reach of the river it has about 12 to 14 kilometers that allows the navigation of small boats.

Originally its upper section was named in mapudungun Raghleuvu, clay river, and in the lower section had its present name, that later became the name of the whole, a compound of caran, "to form a town", and of pangui, "the lion".

== Sources ==
- Francisco Solano Asta Buruaga y Cienfuegos, Diccionario geográfico de la República de Chile, NUEVA YORK, D. APPLETON Y COMPAÑÍA, 1899: Carampangue. —(Rio). Page 120
