= Óscar Izurieta =

Óscar Izurieta may refer to:

- Óscar Izurieta Ferrer (born 1950), Chilean Army general, son
- Óscar Izurieta Molina (1909–1990), Chilean Army general, father
