= Santa María Island, Chile =

Island in Chile

Coordinates: 37°03′0″S 73°31′0″W

Isla Santa María
Native name: Santa María
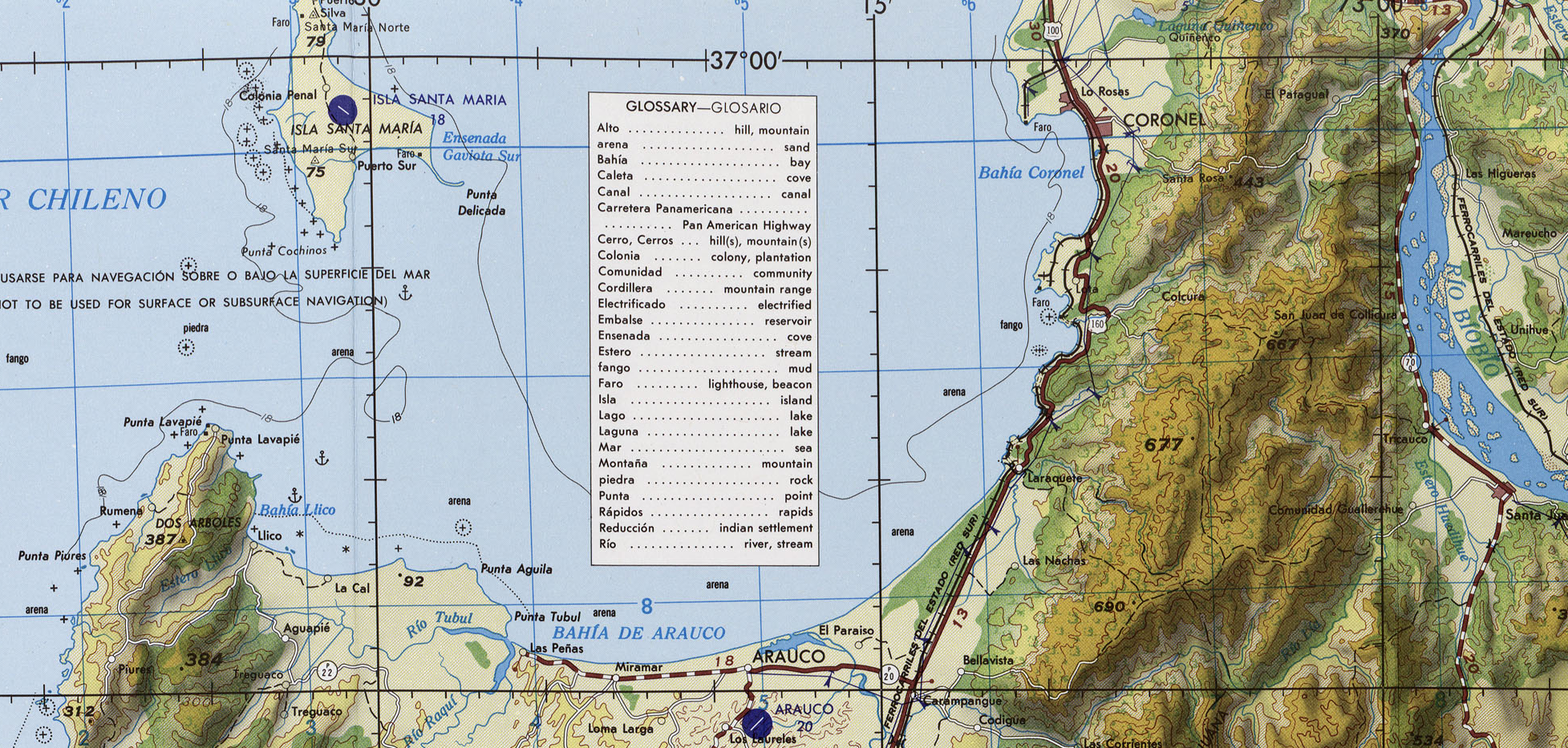
- Gulf of Arauco, Chile
- Interactive map of Isla Santa María

Geography
- Location: East Pacific Ocean
- Total islands: 3
- Major islands: 1
- Area: 35 km^{2} (14 sq mi)

Administration
- Chile
- Regions of Chile: Bío Bío Region
- Communes of Chile: Coronel, Chile
- Largest settlement: Puerto Sur

Demographics
- Population: 2200

Santa María Island is a sparsely inhabited island located in the Bay of Arauco off the western coast of the Concepción Province of the Biobío Region of Chile. It is administered as part of the city of Coronel on the mainland to its east. Despite its relative isolation, the island has been witness to many important historical events from the colonial period through to the modern age.

== History ==
=== Pre-Columbian Period ===
Santa María Island was called Tralca or Penequen by the indigenous Mapuche inhabitants, who were most likely the Nagche, also known as Araucanian, people.

=== European Colonization ===
It is possible that European explorers sighted the island in 1544, but the earliest confirmed discovery of the island was in 1550 by Genoese explorer Juan Bautista Pastene during his second voyage sailing for the Spanish crown.

In 1587, British explorer and privateer Thomas Cavendish landed on the island during his first voyage with 70 men. There they were greeted by the Mapuche and traded with them, and the crew entertained the natives aboard their ship. They departed the island after a few days.

In 1599, Dutch explorer and merchant Simon de Cordes ordered his fleet to stop at the island for supplies and to make repairs during their disastrous circumnavigation attempt. The fleet had been separated by dense fog and some of the ships missed the island due to a mistake on the map. After waiting for two months, the fleet departed.

Dutch explorer Joris van Spilbergen may have also anchored at the island at some point in the early 17th century.

In 1642, the Dutch East India Company joined the Dutch West Indies Company in organizing an expedition to Chile to establish a base for their trade along the west coast of South America under the command of Dutch explorer Hendrick Brouwer. Valdivia, Chiloé Island and Santa María Island were considered due to their isolation and excellent harbors. Valdivia, like all cities south of Bío Bío River, had been abandoned by Spaniards and destroyed by the Mapuches in 1599 during the Destruction of the Seven Cities.

The fleet sailed from Dutch Brazil where John Maurice of Nassau provided them with supplies. After landing on Chiloe Island, Brouwer made a pact with the Mapuche, who were then fighting in the War of Arauco against Spain, to aid in establishing a resettlement at Valdivia. However, on August 7, 1643, Brouwer died before arriving and was succeeded by his vice-admiral Elias Herckman, who landed at the ruins of Valdivia on August 24. Brouwer was buried in the new settlement, which Herckman named Brouwershaven after him. Herckman and his men occupied the location for only two months, departing on October 28, 1643. Having been told that the Dutch planned to return, the Spanish viceroy in Peru sent 1000 men in twenty ships (and 2000 men by land, who never made it) in 1644 to resettle Valdivia and fortify it. The Spanish soldiers in the new garrison disinterred and burned Brouwer's body.

The Battle of Coronel, near Santa María Island

On 26 October 1818 First Chilean Navy Squadron under the command of Manuel Blanco Encalada and captured several ships of a Spanish convoy carrying men and weapons for El Callao off the coast of the island.

=== 20th Century ===
The Battle of Coronel was fought to the northwest of the island on November 1, 1914, in which the East Asia Squadron (Ostasiengeschwader or Kreuzergeschwader) of the Imperial German Navy (Kaiserliche Marine) commanded by Vice-Admiral Graf Maximilian von Spee met and overpowered a British squadron commanded by Rear-Admiral Sir Christopher Cradock. It was an overwhelming German victory; the Germans suffered only 3 wounded, while the British lost over 1,660 men and two armored cruisers, HMS Good Hope and HMS Monmouth. This was the first naval defeat for the British since the Battle of Lake Champlain in the War of 1812 and the first of a British naval squadron since the Battle of Grand Port in 1810.

On 22 April 1924, the sailing ship Garthwray ran aground on Santa María Island in fog. Garthwray had been dismasted by squalls off of Cape Horn in two consecutive attempts to pass the cape from east to west in 1922 and 1923.

On February 27, 2010, an 8.8 MW earthquake struck the island and surrounding area resulting in widespread devastation. Measurements taken after the quake indicated coastal uplifts of between ~0.2 to 3.1 m. A similar phenomenon was documented in 1839 after the 1835 earthquake in the region by Charles Darwin.

== Ecology ==
The island's coasts are home to the South American sea lion, which is known for being highly sexually dimorphic.

Frequently, thousands of dead cuttlefish, squid, and other marine animals have washed up along the island's coasts. Scientists largely blame the phenomenon on El Nino, a disruptive weather phenomenon that comes with warming sea surface temperatures in the equatorial Pacific.

=== Important Bird Area ===
The island has been designated an Important Bird Area (IBA) by BirdLife International because it supports significant populations of sooty shearwaters, pink-footed shearwaters, Peruvian diving-petrels, red-legged cormorants, and Franklin's gulls.

== Transport ==
Puerto Sur Airport (ICAO: SCIS) is located on Santa Maria Island. It has only one runway, which has a length of 2,625 feet (800 metres).

== Literature ==
Benito Cereno by Herman Melville takes place on the island.

== Climate ==
Climate data for Santa María Island
Month	Jan	Feb	Mar	Apr	May	Jun	Jul	Aug	Sep	Oct	Nov	Dec	Year
Mean daily maximum °C (°F)	18.3 (64.9)	18.1 (64.6)	17.6 (63.7)	15.6 (60.1)	14.5 (58.1)	13.3 (55.9)	12.8 (55.0)	12.6 (54.7)	13.4 (56.1)	14.2 (57.6)	15.7 (60.3)	17.2 (63.0)	15.3 (59.5)
Daily mean °C (°F)	14.8 (58.6)	14.7 (58.5)	14.0 (57.2)	12.6 (54.7)	11.8 (53.2)	10.2 (50.4)	10.3 (50.5)	9.8 (49.6)	10.4 (50.7)	11.8 (53.2)	12.6 (54.7)	13.9 (57.0)	12.2 (54.0)
Mean daily minimum °C (°F)	11.6 (52.9)	11.7 (53.1)	11.2 (52.2)	10.2 (50.4)	9.5 (49.1)	8.4 (47.1)	7.7 (45.9)	7.3 (45.1)	7.9 (46.2)	8.6 (47.5)	9.7 (49.5)	10.9 (51.6)	9.6 (49.2)
Average precipitation mm (inches)	15.9 (0.63)	12.6 (0.50)	34.3 (1.35)	66.8 (2.63)	152.8 (6.02)	158.2 (6.23)	149.6 (5.89)	122.3 (4.81)	70.4 (2.77)	39.0 (1.54)	29.0 (1.14)	24.9 (0.98)	875.8 (34.49)
Average relative humidity (%)	83	84	86	88	90	91	90	88	87	86	84	83	87
Source: Bioclimatografia de Chile

== See also ==
- Mapuche
- Coronel, Chile
