= Sergio Páez Verdugo =

Chilean politician (1933–2025)

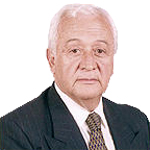
- Páez Verdugo in 1990

Member of the Senate of Chile
- In office 11 March 1990 – 11 March 2006
- Preceded by: Creation of the Circumscription
- Succeeded by: Camilo Escalona
- Constituency: Los Lagos Region (17th Circumscription)

Member of the Chamber of Deputies
- In office 15 May 1969 – 21 September 1973
- Succeeded by: Dissolution of the Congress
- Constituency: Llanquihue Department

Personal details
- Born: 1 June 1933 Santiago, Chile
- Died: 2 July 2025 (aged 92) Santiago, Chile
- Party: National Falange (1952–1957); Christian Democratic Party (1957–2025)
- Spouse: Carmen Benavides
- Children: Two
- Parent(s): Hernán Páez; Inés Verdugo
- Occupation: Politician

Sergio Páez Verdugo (1 June 1933 – 2 July 2025) was a Chilean politician who served as a deputy and senator.

He died on 2 July 2025, at the age of 92.

== Early life and education ==
Páez was born in Santiago on 1 June 1933. He was the son of Hernán Páez Mateluna and Inés Verdugo Pantoja. He married Carmen Paz Benavides Cuevas, with whom he had two children, Teresa and Sergio Alejandro.

He completed his secondary education at the José Victorino Lastarria High School in Providencia. He later enrolled at the Higher Institute of Commerce of Santiago, where he obtained the professional degree of general accountant.

== Professional career ==
Between 1953 and 1964, Páez worked professionally as an entrepreneur in the construction sector. Following the military coup of 11 September 1973, he resumed his professional activities and worked as a financial, tax, and accounting adviser to various private-sector companies.

== Political career ==
Páez began his political activities in 1952 when he joined the Falange Nacional. Between 1954 and 1963, he served as a trade union leader of the Association of Professors and Employees of the University of Chile (APEUCH). From 1957 onward, he was a member of the Christian Democratic Party of Chile (DC) and collaborated in its founding process.

During the administration of President Eduardo Frei Montalva, Páez was appointed head of an area within the General Secretariat of Government in 1964, a position he held for four years. From 1974 onward, he collaborated in the reorganization of the Christian Democratic Party, which had declared itself in recess under the military regime of Augusto Pinochet.

In 1979, he served as vice president of the association of former Christian Democratic parliamentarians and publicly denounced human rights violations committed by the Pinochet regime. In parallel, he was elected general coordinator responsible for organizing the International Parliamentary Assembly and served as a delegate for Llanquihue to the National Council of the DC.

In 1982, Páez organized the National Development Project (PRODEN), aimed at restructuring political and social alliances in support of the restoration of democracy, including the Democratic Alliance and the National Accord. As part of the opposition movement, he participated in meetings held on 11 May 1983 that led to the first national protest against the military regime.

Between 1984 and 1987, he served as general coordinator of the International Assembly for Democracy in Chile (APAINDE), promoting international solidarity meetings attended by parliamentarians from multiple countries. He later led the No campaign command in the southern zone of Chile during the 1988 plebiscite.

In 1992, Páez was appointed national councilor of the Christian Democratic Party for a two-year term. In 1993, he participated in the presidential campaign command of Eduardo Frei Ruiz-Tagle. In 2005, he ran as a DC candidate for the Senate representing the 17th Senatorial District (Los Lagos South), but was not elected.

He served as president of the Inter-Parliamentary Union between 2002 and 2005. In April 2006, Páez joined BancoEstado as a member of its board of directors and of its Audit Committee. Between 2010 and 2017, he served as president of the Council for Parliamentary Allowances of the National Congress of Chile.
