= Cristóbal Urruticoechea =

Chilean politician

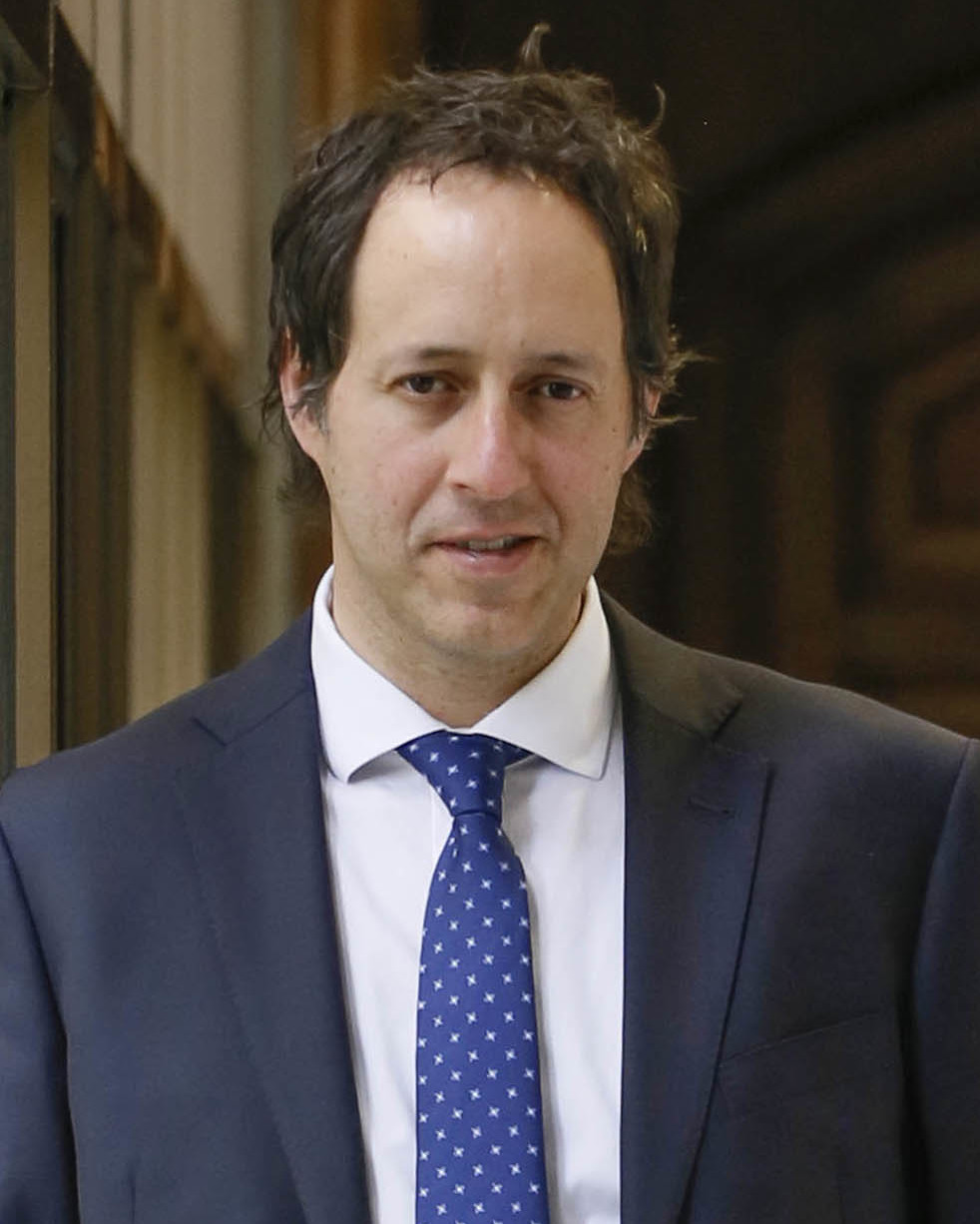
- Urruticoechea in 2018

Member of the Chamber of Deputies
- Incumbent
- Assumed office 11 March 2018
- Preceded by: District established
- Constituency: District 21

Personal details
- Born: 21 November 1975 (age 50) Santiago, Chile
- Party: Independent Democratic Union (2005–2012); National Renewal (2017–2020); Republican Party (2021–2024); National Libertarian Party (2024−)
- Children: 7
- Education: Inacap
- Profession: Graphic designer, publicist

Cristóbal Ignacio de Loyola Urruticoechea Ríos (born 21 November 1975) is a Chilean politician currently serving as a member of the Chamber of Deputies. A member of the National Libertarian Party, he has represented District 21 of the Biobío Region since 2018. He previously served as councilman of Los Ángeles.

Urruticoechea voted in opposition to the legalization of same-sex marriage in the Chilean Congress in 2021. He explained his vote by saying that homosexual couples "claiming rights that nature denies them is going against every notion of natural order" and said that the bill to legalize same-sex marriage was "filled with fictions… which suppress the truth." He added that he was neither racist, discriminatory, nor homophobic.
