= Las Misiones Airport =

- IATA: none; ICAO: SCNM

Summary
- Airport type: Public
- Serves: Cañete, Chile
- Elevation AMSL: 252 ft / 77 m
- Coordinates: 37°46′31″S 73°23′00″W

Map
- Location of Cañete Airport in Chile

Runways
Direction	Length		Surface
Direction	m	ft	Surface
02/20	698	2,290	Grass
- Source: Landings.com Google Maps GCM

Las Misiones Airport (ICAO: SCNM) is an airport serving Cañete, town in the Bío Bío Region of Chile.

The original 900-metre (3,000 ft) runway was moved slightly west and shortened prior to 2010.

The airport runs along the highway just north of Cañete. There is high terrain northeast of the runway.

== See also ==
- Transport in Chile
- List of airports in Chile
