= Escalona (disambiguation) =

Escalona may refer to:

- Escalona, a town in the province of Toledo, Spain
- Escalona del Prado, a town in the province of Segovia, Spain
- Escalona, a locality in the municipality of Puértolas, province of Huesca, Spain
- Alejandro Escalona, Chilean footballer
- Camilo Escalona (1955–2026), Chilean politician
- Edgmer Escalona (born 1986), Venezuelan baseball pitcher
- Miguel Escalona, Spanish footballer
- Rafael Escalona, Colombian composer
- Escalona (TV series), a Colombian TV series
- Río Escalona, a river in the province of Valencia, Spain
- Duke of Escalona, a Spanish noble title.
