= Puerto Sur Airport =

- IATA: none; ICAO: SCIS

Summary
- Airport type: Public
- Serves: Isla Santa María
- Elevation AMSL: 20 ft / 6 m
- Coordinates: 37°1′45″S 73°30′30″W

Map
- Location of Puerto Sur Airport in Chile

Runways
Direction	Length		Surface
Direction	m	ft	Surface
02/20	802	2,631	Asphalt
- Source: Landings.com Google Maps GCM

Puerto Sur Airport (ICAO: SCIS) is an airport serving Isla Santa María, a Pacific island in the Bío Bío Region of Chile. The island is 31 kilometres (19 mi) west of Coronel.

Northeast approach and departure are over the water.

The Concepcion VOR-DME (Ident: CAR) is located 27.2 nautical miles (50.4 km) northeast of the airport.

== See also ==
- Transport in Chile
- List of airports in Chile
