= Todo comenzó en Curanilahue =

Book by Felipe Berríos

- Author: Felipe Berríos
- Original title: Todo comenzó en Curanilahue
- Cover artist: Asunción Duke
- Language: Spanish
- Series: Felipe Berríos
- Subject: Religion, spirituality
- Publisher: Aguilar, El Mercurio
- Publication date: 2006
- Publication place: Chile
- Pages: 176
- ISBN: 956-239-428-X
- Preceded by: Puntadas con hilo
- Followed by: Ojos Que No Ven

Todo comenzó en Curanilahue (Everything started in Curanilahue in English) is the fourth book by Chilean author Felipe Berríos. It was published by Editorial Aguilar and El Mercurio in March 2006.

== Review ==
Todo comenzó en Curanilahue is about the city of Curanilahue and its interaction with the youth of the Techo foundation in Chile. It recounts the work started by the first young people in 1997 and continues to the present. The book's copyright proceeds go towards supporting the work of the Techo foundation.

Felipe Berríos served as the chaplain of the NGO Techo from 1997 until 2010, when he traveled to Africa in May.
