= Playa de Colcura =

Beach in Chile

Coordinates: 37.11620°S 73.15248°W

The Playa de Colcura is a beach in the vicinity of the commune of Lota in the province of Concepcion, in the Biobío Region of Chile.
