= Paraulax queulensis =

Scientific classification
- Kingdom: Animalia
- Phylum: Arthropoda
- Class: Insecta
- Order: Hymenoptera
- Family: Paraulacidae
- Genus: Paraulax
- Species: P. queulensis

Binomial name
- Paraulax queulensis Nieves-Aldrey et al., 2009

Species of wasp

Paraulax queulensis is a species of gall wasp.
