= Óscar Izurieta Molina =

Chilean Army general (1909–1990)

General Óscar Izurieta

Commander-in-Chief of the Chilean Army
- In office 1958 – 4 June 1964
- President: Jorge Alessandri
- Preceded by: René Vidal Merino
- Succeeded by: Bernardino Parada

Personal details
- Education: Bernardo O'Higgins Military Academy
- Profession: Military officer

Military service
- Allegiance: Chile
- Branch/service: Chilean Army
- Rank: General of the Army

Óscar Izurieta Molina (Note: In this Chilean name, the first or paternal surname is Izurieta and the second or maternal family name is Molina.) (October 24, 1909 – August 17, 1990) was a Chilean military man. Molina had the grade of General of the Army and was Commander in Chief of the Army of Chile from November 14, 1958, to November 3, 1964. He is the father of former commander in chief, General Oscar Izurieta Ferrer and was the first commander in chief who used the name of Army General as Commander in Chief. His father was Ricardo Izurieta Torres, a Spanish immigrant originally from Ortigosa de Cameros, La Rioja, Spain, who arrived in Chile during the first decade of the twentieth century.

Molina graduated from the Military Academy at age 16 and joined the Army War College of Chile at 22. He served in the Infantry School and the Military Academy. In 1941, he went to the United States, becoming the first Chilean official at the Infantry School of Fort Benning, Georgia. He will later become Commander in Chief. He was also a member of the Council of State of Chile during the military government.
