= Cañete, Chile =

Cañete
- City and Commune
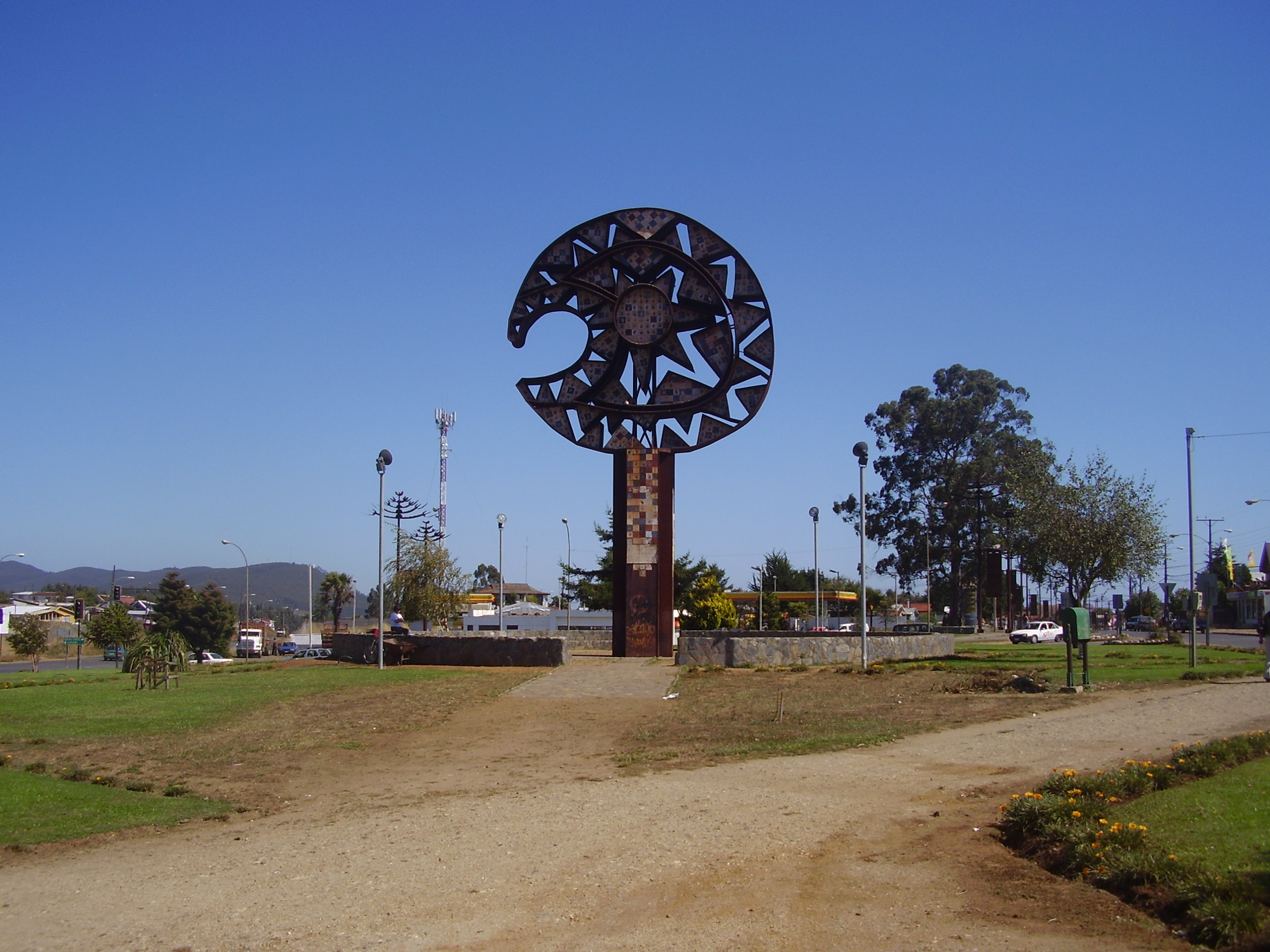
- Mapuche Clava symbol

- Coat of arms Location of the Cañete commune in Biobío Region Location in Chile
- Nickname: The Historic City
- Coordinates: 37°47′58″S 73°23′43″W
- Country: Chile
- Region: Biobío
- Province: Arauco
- Founded as: Cañete de la Frontera
- Founded: January, 1558
- Named for: Cañete, Spain

Government
  - Type: Municipality
  - Alcalde: Jorge Radonich Barra (RN)

Area
  - Total: 760.4 km^{2} (293.6 sq mi)
- Elevation: 80 m (260 ft)

Population (2012 Census)
  - Total: 31,805
  - Density: 41.83/km^{2} (108.3/sq mi)
  - Urban: 19,839
  - Rural: 11,431
- Demonym: Cañetino

Sex
  - Men: 15,625
  - Women: 15,645
- Time zone: UTC−4 (CLT)
  - Summer (DST): UTC−3 (CLST)
- Area code: 56 + 41
- Website: Official website (in Spanish)

Cañete is a city and commune in Chile, located in the Arauco Province of the Biobío Region. It is located 135 km to the south of Concepción. Cañete is known as a "Historic City" (Spanish: ciudad histórica) as it is one of the oldest cities in the country. The Battle of Tucapel and Pedro de Valdivia's death happened near the city's current location. Cañete was also an important location in the Arauco War.

== History ==
=== Etymology ===
Cañete was founded under the name of "Cañete de la Frontera" in 1558. The city was established by Governor García Hurtado de Mendoza and named in honor of his father, Andrés Hurtado de Mendoza, 3rd Marquis of Cañete. The marquis' title originated from the Castile town Cañete.

=== Fort Tucapel ===
The area was known as Tucapel, meaning taking by force in Mapudungun. In October 1553, Pedro de Valdivia founded the Fort Tucapel, next to the present city of Cañete. Two months later, native Mapuches destroyed the fort. Valdivia returned on 25 December 1553, to rebuild the fort, but the Spanish army was once again defeated in the Battle of Tucapel, an early battle in the Arauco War. Valdivia was captured and killed.

=== Cañete de la Frontera ===
In January 1558, Governor García Hurtado de Mendoza founded the city as Cañete de la Frontera three kilometers to the east of the present location of the city. Hurtado de Mendoza named Alonso de Reinoso as corregidor of Cañete. The Mapuches, led by Caupolican, besieged the city, but they were defeated in the battle of the Fort of Cañete.

Subsequent military defeats forced governor Francisco de Villagra to abandon the city in January 1563. Three years later, a new city was started under the orders of Rodrigo de Quiroga but it did not prosper either due to constant attacks by the Mapuches.

=== Refounding ===
The present city was founded on 12 November 1868 by colonel Cornelio Saavedra Rodríguez as part of the pacification of Araucanía.

=== 21st century ===
On 12 November 2006 a major car accident occurred near Canete when a bus with 28 people fell into the River Tucapel and 19 passengers died. 17 of the victims were soldiers who were members of the band Reinforced Regiment No. 7 "Chacabuco" Concepción. The group was traveling to a celebration for the anniversary of the founding of Cañete. The press titled the accident "tragedy of Cañete," like the tragedy of Antuco. President Michelle Bachelet, the minister of National Defense Vivianne Blanlot and Commander-in-Chief Óscar Izurieta traveled to Concepción for the funerals.

The 2010 Chilean earthquake caused major damage to the city. The Kallvu Llanka hospital, which was being constructed, was severely impacted, delaying its opening from 8 October 2010 till 22 October 2013.

== Geography ==
=== Climate ===
Climate data for Cañete
| Month | Jan | Feb | Mar | Apr | May | Jun | Jul | Aug | Sep | Oct | Nov | Dec | Year |
|---|---|---|---|---|---|---|---|---|---|---|---|---|---|
| Record high °C (°F) | 31 (88) | 33 (91) | 31 (88) | 29 (84) | 26 (79) | 22 (72) | 26 (79) | 24 (75) | 29 (84) | 27 (81) | 28 (82) | 32 (90) | 33 (91) |
| Mean daily maximum °C (°F) | 23 (73) | 23 (73) | 22 (72) | 19 (66) | 16 (61) | 14 (57) | 14 (57) | 14 (57) | 16 (61) | 18 (64) | 20 (68) | 22 (72) | 18 (65) |
| Mean daily minimum °C (°F) | 11 (52) | 11 (52) | 10 (50) | 8 (46) | 7 (45) | 7 (45) | 6 (43) | 6 (43) | 6 (43) | 7 (45) | 9 (48) | 10 (50) | 8 (47) |
| Record low °C (°F) | 5 (41) | 1 (34) | 3 (37) | −6 (21) | −2 (28) | −2 (28) | −4 (25) | −2 (28) | −1 (30) | −1 (30) | 0 (32) | 1 (34) | −6 (21) |
| Average rainfall mm (inches) | 9.0 (0.35) | 17.0 (0.67) | 25.0 (0.98) | 60.0 (2.36) | 143.0 (5.63) | 189.0 (7.44) | 174.0 (6.85) | 146.0 (5.75) | 72.0 (2.83) | 59.0 (2.32) | 33.0 (1.30) | 19.0 (0.75) | 946 (37.23) |

== Demography ==
According to the National Statistics Institute's 2002 census, Cañete spans over an area of 760.4 km^{2} (294 sq mi) and has 31,270 inhabitants (15,625 men and 15,645 women). 63.4% (19,839) live in urban areas and 36.6% (11,431) reside in rural areas. The population grew by 6.6% (1,947 persons) between the 1992 and 2002 censuses.

Projections indicated that the population in 2009 was 33,535 inhabitants.

== Administration ==
Cañete is a commune, the smallest administrative subdivision in Chile. It is a third-level administrative division administered by a municipal council, headed by an alcalde (mayor) who is directly elected by the public every four years and leading a six-member council. The municipality of Cañete is a member of the Association of Municipalities of the Arauco Province, also known as Arauco 7.

Within the electoral divisions of Chile, Cañete is represented in the Chamber of Deputies by Manuel Monsalve (PS) and Iván Norambuena (UDI) as part of the 46th electoral district, together with Lota, Lebu, Arauco, Curanilahue, Los Álamos, Contulmo and Tirúa. The commune is represented in the Senate by Víctor Pérez Varela (UDI) and Felipe Harboe Bascuñán (PPD) as part of the 13th senatorial constituency (Biobío-Coast).

== Transportation ==
Las Misiones Airport is located in northern Cañete.

The city also has several bus terminals downtown, including Pedro de Valdivia terminal, Jeldres terminal, and Biobio-Jota Ewert terminal. Intercity buses run to Santiago, Concepción, and Temuco.

== Human resources ==
=== Education ===
Cañete has 34 primary and secondary schools, of which 24 are public. Top schools include Liceo Gabriela Mistral, Instituto San José and Liceo B-56. Higher education institutions include the Technological Institute of the Catholic University of the Most Holy Conception and the CFT Lota Arauco of the University of Concepción.

=== Public health ===
The Intercultural Hospital Kallvu Llanka (Mapudungun for "The Universe's Jewel") is located on route P-60-R, in northern Cañete. It offers traditional medicine while channeling and honoring mapuche culture through aspects such a circular waiting rooms similar to rukas. The hospital was opened in 2013.

== Culture ==
=== Museums ===
The Mapuche Museum of Cañete is located in the southern part of the city and has been open since 1968.

=== Rural culture ===
Every year, between January and February the Agricultural, Livestock and Forestry Fair of Cañete (Spanish: Feria Agrícola, Ganadera y Forestal, FAGAF) takes place on the Anike farm two kilometers from the city. The fair is considered the largest in the region and one of the most important agricultural events in Chile. It usually hosts more than one hundred exhibitors and features activities such as loose mare threshing, agricultural and forestry machinery exhibitions and gastronomy contests, amongst other activities. Additionally, the fair incorporates the local culture by showcasing Mapuche and Chilean farm traditions. Since 2015, the fair has been held in conjunction with Cañete Week which features singers, music groups and comedians.

Another event, the Farmer Fest of Cayucupil, takes place 14 km from the city center in a rural area.

=== Movies ===
Cañete is continuing to grow its film and entertainment presence. The Lebu International Film Festival is headquartered in the city. Also, Jorge Olguín's 2014 movie Whispers of the Forest was filmed around Cañete, mainly in Reussland Park and Morales Castle, 10 km north of the city.

== Notable people ==
- Juan Antonio Ríos (1888-1946) – Chilean politician and lawyer, President of Chile between 1942 and 1946.
- Clímaco Hermosilla (born 1944) – Chilean professor, historian and writer.
