= Arauco, Chile =

City and commune in the Bío Bío Region, Chile

Arauco
- City and Commune
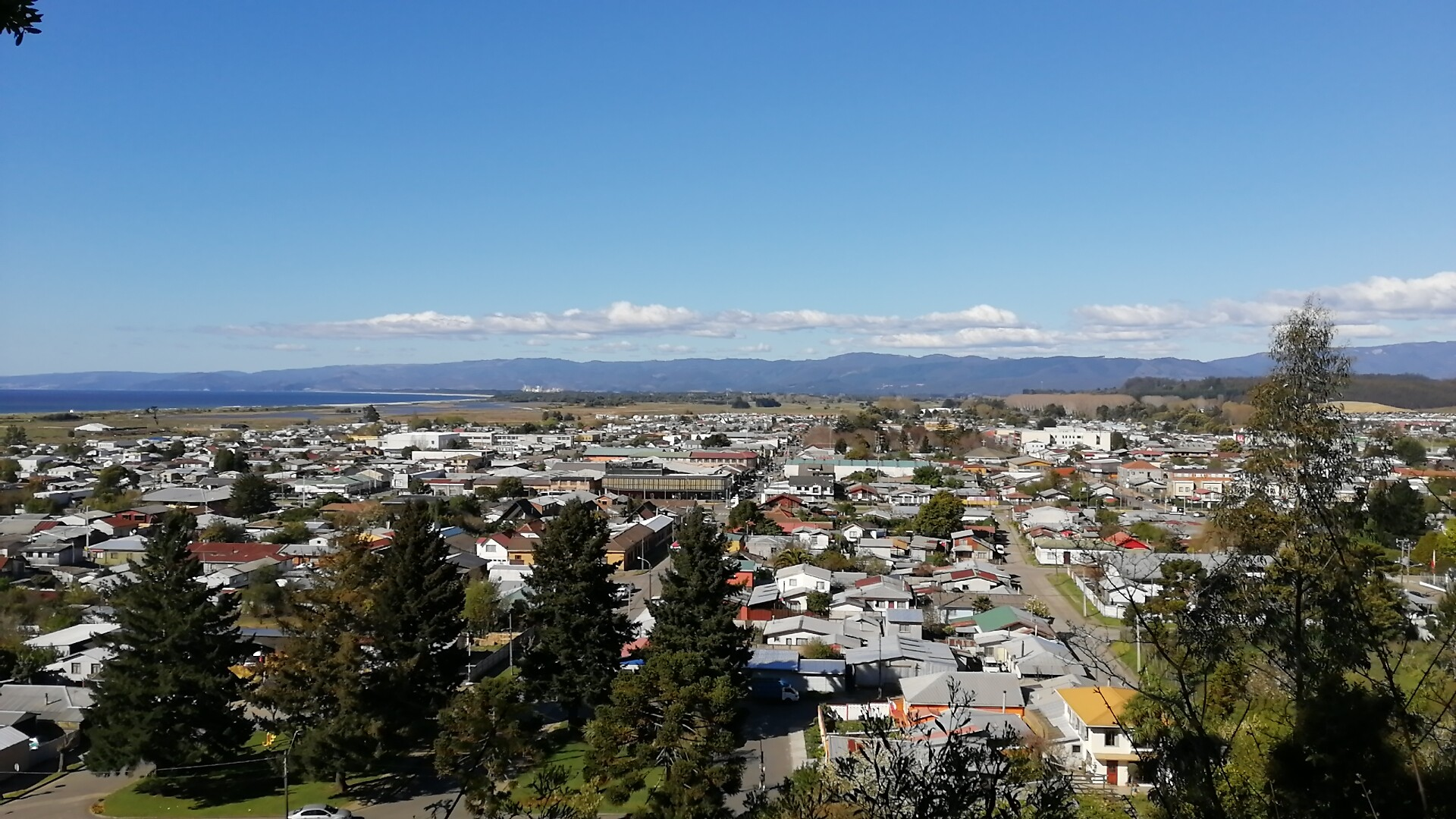

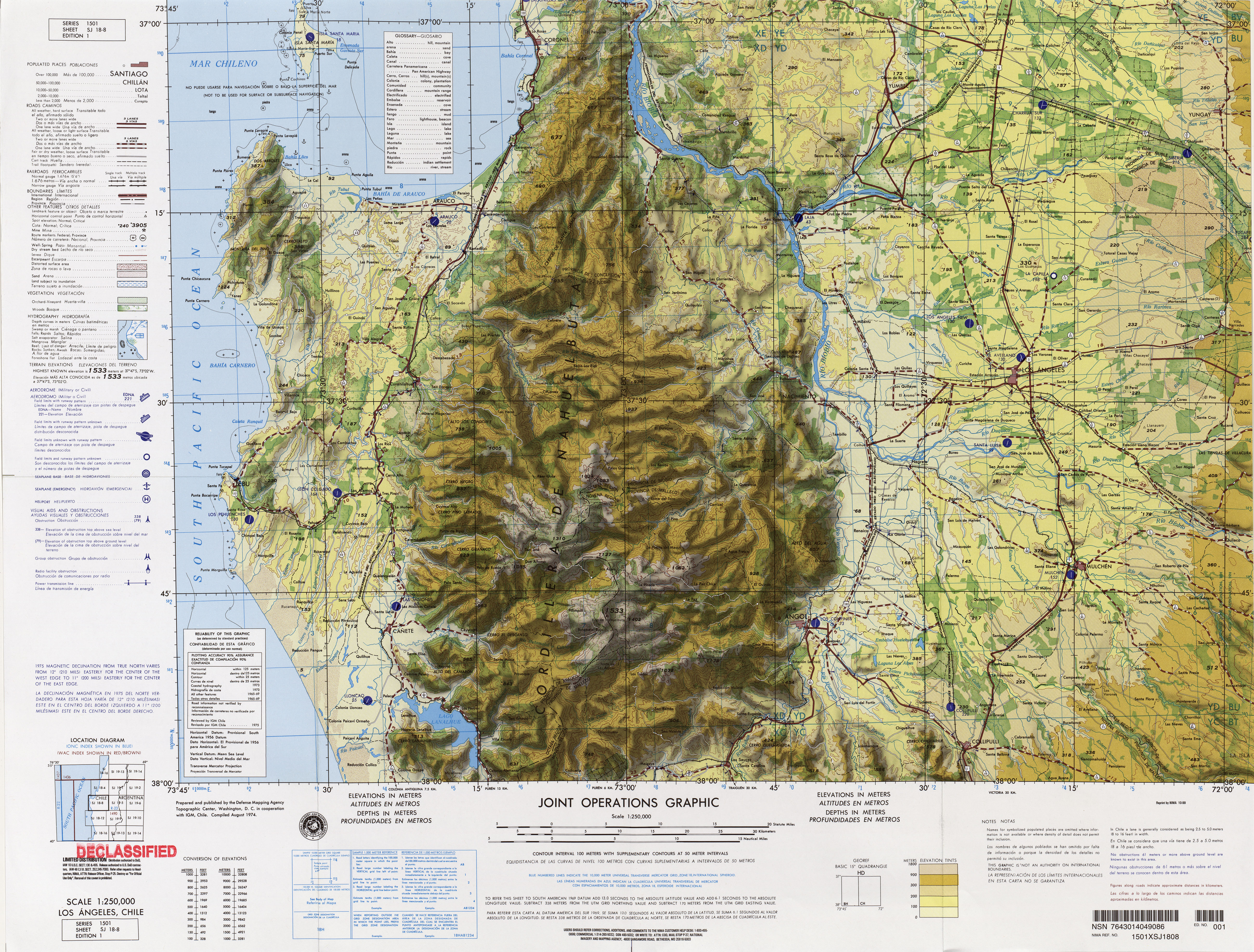
- Flag Coat of arms Location of the Arauco commune in Bío Bío Region Location in Chile
- Coordinates (city): 37°15′S 73°19′W
- Country: Chile
- Region: Bío Bío
- Province: Arauco
- Founded: 1552

Government
  - Type: Municipality
  - Alcalde: Juan Mauricio Alarcón Guzmán

Area
  - Total: 956.1 km^{2} (369.2 sq mi)
- As of 2002
- Elevation: 12 m (39 ft)

Population (2012 Census)
  - Total: 34,902
  - Density: 36.50/km^{2} (94.55/sq mi)
  - Urban: 24,269
  - Rural: 10,604
- Demonym: Araucano

Sex
  - Men: 17,603
  - Women: 17,270
- Time zone: UTC−4 (CLT)
  - Summer (DST): UTC−3 (CLST)
- Area code: 56 + 41
- Climate: Csb
- Website: Official website (in Spanish)

Arauco is a city and commune (Spanish: comuna) in Chile, located in Arauco Province in the Bío Bío Region. The region was a Moluche aillarehue. The Spanish settlements founded here during the Conquest of Chile were destroyed on numerous occasions by the Mapuche during the Arauco War.

== Etymology ==
The name of the commune comes from the word ragko, which in Mapudungun means clayey water. This word was adopted by the Spanish as rauco, just as in the city of Rauco. It is also said that it may have some relation to the term used by the Incas to refer to the Mapuche, promaucaes or purumauca.

== History ==
=== Old Arauco ===
In 1552 Pedro de Valdivia the first governor of Chile, founded a fort, named San Felipe de Rauco or de Araucan. It was 12 km (7 mi) east of the location of the modern city of Arauco in the part of the valley immediately on the South or left bank of the Carampangue River at the point where on the opposite bank it receives the riachuelo of Conumo. Valdivia planned it to be the base for a city he planned to found. The Mapuche destroyed the fort in 1554, after killing Valdivia's insane mother-in-law. It was raised again after the battle of Quiapo, by García Hurtado de Mendoza in 1559. Destroyed again in 1563 it was rebuilt again in 1566 by Rodrigo de Quiroga and became a small town, that remained so without growing until being transferred to the current site of the city of Arauco.

=== Arauco ===
The population of old Araucan was moved in 1590 by Governor Don Alonso de Sotomayor to the seacoast, four kilometers to southwest of the mouth of the Carampangue River located between its beach on the Bay of Arauco and the hill on the southwestern side of the place called cerro de Colocólo. The lands for the site were ceded by the cacique Colocólo, and it was named Villa de San Ildefonso de Arauco. However, six years later, Martín García Óñez de Loyola transferred it to its present site, a fort raised on the slope of the Cerro Colocólo and gave it the name of Ciudad de San Felipe de Araucan. In the great Mapuche Uprising of 1598, that followed the death of Governor Loyola, it was destroyed by the Mapuche once again. It was recovered by Governor Alonso de Ribera in 1603, it continued to be harassed by the Mapuche until its inhabitants were forced to leave it in another great rising in 1655. Governor Ángel de Peredo recovered it in 1662 and Governor Francisco de Meneses Brito in 1665. Under the government of Don Juan Henríquez de Villalobos its fort was reconstructed in 1673, and served as the defense of the town until it was destroyed almost completely by the earthquake of February 20, 1835. It still suffered from the hostilities of the Mapuche in their uprisings of 1723 and 1766 and during the war of Independence in the assault that they made on it on June 4, 1817, with their royalist allies. Population began to gather around this fort and it became the city of Araucan (later Arauco) on December 7, 1852. Later it became the capital of the department of Araucan and now Commune of Arauco in the Arauco Province.

== Demographics ==
According to the 2002 census of Population and Housing by the National Statistics Institute (Instituto Nacional de Estadísticas or INE) the commune of Arauco spans an area of 956.1 km^{2} (369 sq mi) had 34,873 inhabitants; of these, 24,269 (69.6%) lived in urban areas and 10,604 (30.4%) in rural areas. At that time, there were 17,603 men and 17,270 women. The population grew by 17.6% (5,216 persons) between the 1992 and 2002 censuses.

== Administration ==
As a commune, Arauco is a third-level administrative division of Chile administered by a municipal council, headed by an alcalde who is directly elected every four years. The 2008-2012 alcalde is Mauricio Alarcón Guzmán (ILE).

Within the electoral divisions of Chile, Arauco is represented in the Chamber of Deputies by Manuel Monsalve (PS) and Iván Norambuena (UDI) as part of the 46th electoral district, together with Lota, Lebu, Curanilahue, Los Álamos, Cañete, Contulmo and Tirúa. The commune is represented in the Senate by Victor Pérez Varela (UDI) and Mariano Ruiz-Esquide Jara (PDC) as part of the 13th senatorial constituency (Biobío-Coast).

== Climate ==
Climate data for Punta Lavapie
| Month | Jan | Feb | Mar | Apr | May | Jun | Jul | Aug | Sep | Oct | Nov | Dec | Year |
|---|---|---|---|---|---|---|---|---|---|---|---|---|---|
| Mean daily maximum °C (°F) | 20.4 (68.7) | 20.1 (68.2) | 18.9 (66.0) | 16.8 (62.2) | 15.0 (59.0) | 13.5 (56.3) | 13.0 (55.4) | 13.2 (55.8) | 13.9 (57.0) | 15.3 (59.5) | 17.1 (62.8) | 18.9 (66.0) | 16.3 (61.4) |
| Daily mean °C (°F) | 16.7 (62.1) | 16.4 (61.5) | 15.6 (60.1) | 13.7 (56.7) | 12.3 (54.1) | 11.0 (51.8) | 10.6 (51.1) | 10.5 (50.9) | 11.1 (52.0) | 12.2 (54.0) | 13.7 (56.7) | 15.4 (59.7) | 13.3 (55.9) |
| Mean daily minimum °C (°F) | 12.2 (54.0) | 12.1 (53.8) | 11.8 (53.2) | 10.4 (50.7) | 9.1 (48.4) | 8.0 (46.4) | 7.5 (45.5) | 7.2 (45.0) | 7.7 (45.9) | 8.6 (47.5) | 9.7 (49.5) | 11.0 (51.8) | 9.6 (49.3) |
| Average precipitation mm (inches) | 14.9 (0.59) | 13.7 (0.54) | 39.2 (1.54) | 72.7 (2.86) | 125.8 (4.95) | 153.4 (6.04) | 128.2 (5.05) | 93.2 (3.67) | 68.6 (2.70) | 35.0 (1.38) | 32.2 (1.27) | 27.0 (1.06) | 803.9 (31.65) |
| Average relative humidity (%) | 77 | 79 | 81 | 83 | 85 | 85 | 85 | 84 | 83 | 82 | 80 | 79 | 82 |
Source: Bioclimatografia de Chile
