= Curanilahue =

- city and Commune
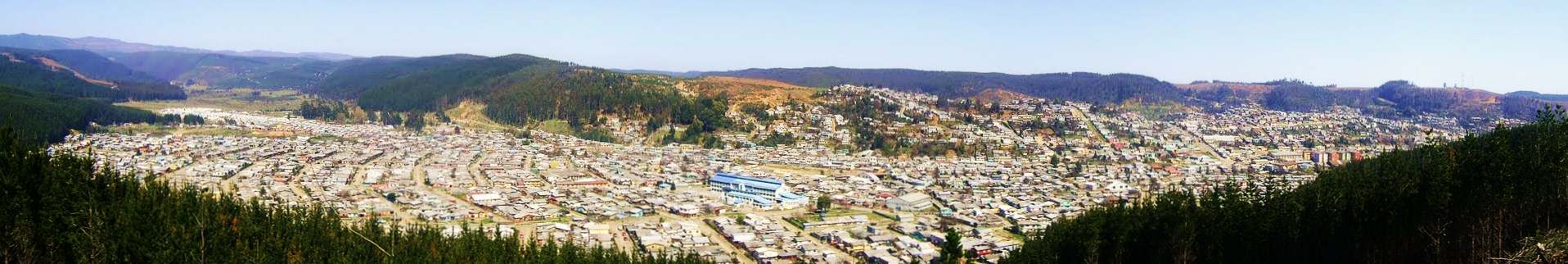

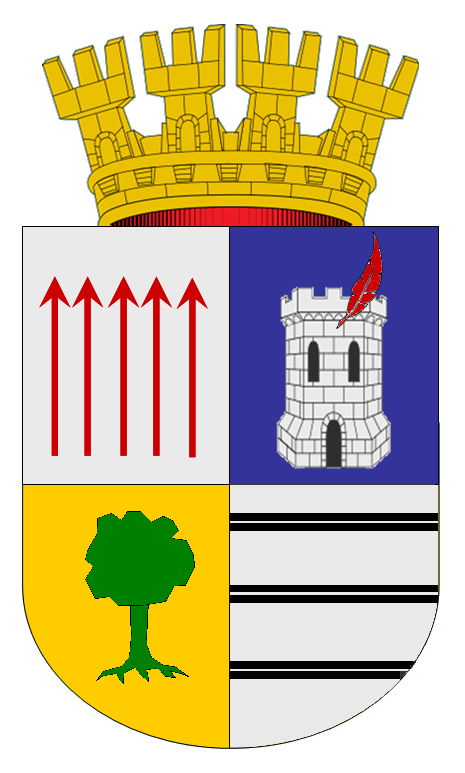
- Coat of arms Location of the Curanilahue commune in the Biobío Region Location in Chile
- Nickname: Chue
- Coordinates (city): 37°28′35″S 73°20′40″W
- Country: Chile
- Region: Biobío
- Province: Arauco

Government
  - Type: Municipality
  - Alcalde: Alejandra Burgos Bizama. (PDC)

Area
  - Total: 994.3 km^{2} (383.9 sq mi)
- Elevation: 138 m (453 ft)

Population (2012 Census)
  - Total: 32,000
  - Urban: 30,126
  - Rural: 1,817
- Demonym: Curanilahuino

Sex
  - Men: 16,115
  - Women: 15,828
- Time zone: UTC−4 (CLT)
  - Summer (DST): UTC−3 (CLST)
- Area code: 56 + 41
- Website: Official website (in Spanish)

Curanilahue (Spanish pronunciation: [kuɾaniˈlawe]) is a Chilean commune and city in Arauco Province, Biobío Region. Its name comes from Mapundungun "Cura", meaning "Stone", and "Nilahue" meaning "Ford".

== Demographics ==
According to the 2002 census of the National Statistics Institute, Curanilahue spans an area of 994.3 km^{2} (384 sq mi) and has 31,943 inhabitants (16,115 men and 15,828 women). Of these, 30,126 (94.3%) lived in urban areas and 1,817 (5.7%) in rural areas. Between the 1992 and 2002 censuses, the population fell by 5% (1,688 persons).

== Administration ==
As a commune, Curanilahue is a third-level administrative division of Chile administered by a municipal council, headed by an alcalde who is directly elected every four years. The current alcalde (as of 2021) is Alejandra Burgos Bizama.

Within the electoral divisions of Chile, Curanilahue is represented in the Chamber of Deputies by Manuel Monsalve (PS) and Iván Norambuena (UDI) as part of the 46th electoral district, together with Lota, Lebu, Arauco, Los Álamos, Cañete, Contulmo and Tirúa. The commune is represented in the Senate by Victor Pérez Varela (UDI) and Mariano Ruiz-Esquide Jara (PDC) as part of the 13th senatorial constituency (Biobío-Coast).

== See also ==
- Todo comenzó en Curanilahue (2006)
