= Lebu, Chile =

City and commune in the Bío Bío Region, Chile

Lebu
- City and Commune
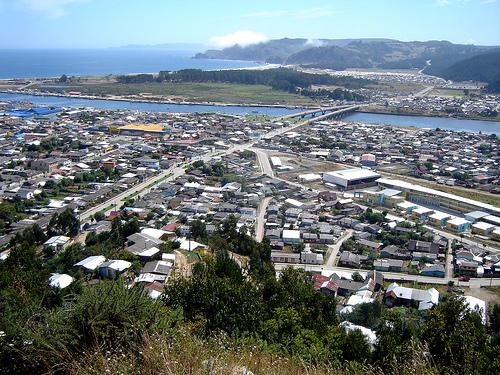
- Panoramical view of Lebu

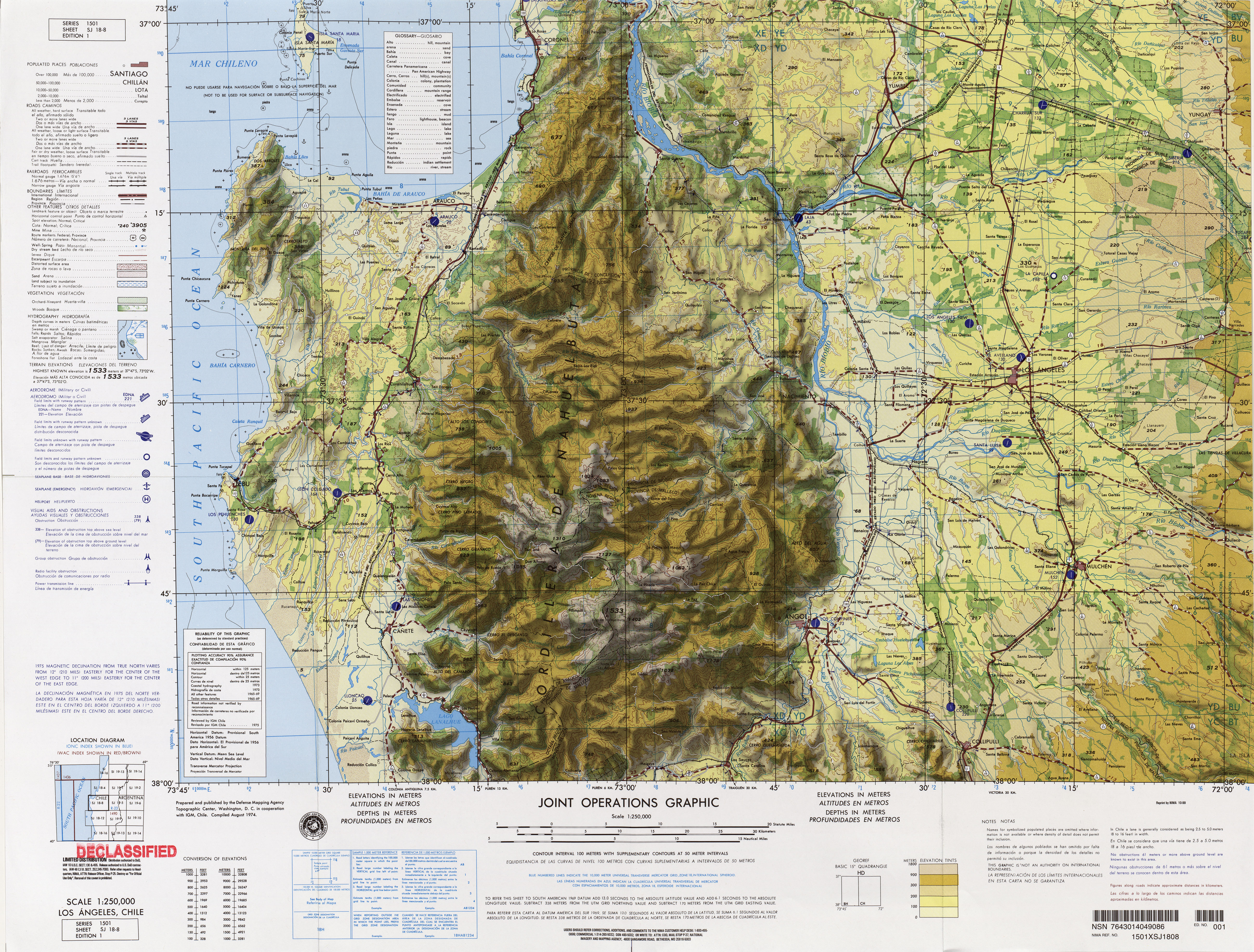
- Coat of arms Location of the Lebu commune in Bío Bío Region Location in Chile
- Coordinates (city): 37°36′S 73°40′W
- Country: Chile
- Region: Bío Bío
- Province: Arauco
- Founded: 8 October 1862

Government
  - Type: Municipality
  - Alcalde: Cristián Abel Peña Morales (Ind.)

Area
  - Total: 561.4 km^{2} (216.8 sq mi)
- Elevation: 74 m (243 ft)

Population (2012 Census)
  - Total: 23,722
  - Density: 42.26/km^{2} (109.4/sq mi)
  - Urban: 21,991
  - Rural: 3,044
- Demonym: Lebulense

Sex
  - Men: 12,416
  - Women: 12,619
- Time zone: UTC−4 (CLT)
  - Summer (DST): UTC−3 (CLST)
- Area code: 56 + 41
- Climate: Csb
- Website: lebu.cl (in Spanish)

Lebu [ˈleβu] is a port city and commune in central Chile administered by the Municipality of Lebu. Lebu is also the capital of Arauco Province in Bío Bío Region. It lies on the south bank of the mouth of the Lebu River.

The commune includes Mocha Island. It is the closest continental town from Easter Island, 3,520 km away.

== History ==
Lebu was first settled a little up the Lebu River from the site of the current city at Fort Santa Margarita built by García Hurtado de Mendoza at the beginning of 1557 on the north bank of the Lebu River by the salto de Gualgalén, to the west of the ford of Cupaño. In 1566 Governor Rodrigo de Quiroga built a fort almost in the same place as the present city of Lebu under the command of captain Agustín de Ahumada. Besieged here by the Mapuche it was finally abandoned in 1569.

Fort Santa Margarita was destroyed in 1599, in 1603 it was rebuilt as Fort Santa Margarita de Austria by the Governor Alonso de Ribera.

In the 20th century the town developed as coal mining centre. The 1960 Valdivia earthquake destroyed numerous houses in the town.

== Culture ==
Every summer, since 2001, the Lebu International Film Festival is held inside the cave.

The commune has three museums: The Lebu Mining Museum, which stores pieces related to the history of coal mining in the area; the Tamaya Museum, inaugurated in 1998, oriented to the natural history of the commune and the province, and the Ethnographic and Historical Archaeological Museum of Punta Morhuilla.

In addition, annually, the Gonzalo Rojas Pizarro Literary Contest is held, international literary contest that is organized by Club de amigos de la Biblioteca Municipal de Lebu, Samuel Lillo Figueroa, and sponsored by the Regional Government of the Region of Biobío, the Municipality of Lebu and Impresos Lebu. Among its winners are named writers such as Alejandro Pla (Spain), José Baroja (Chile), Daniel Matul (Guatemala), Boris Rozas (Argentina), among others.

The foregoing led to the appearance of two literary-artistic magazines: Chonchón 32 and Sudras y Parias. Likewise, during the years 2018 and 2019, the realization of the I and II Latin American Meeting of poets and narrators in Lebu, events which were attended by authors from the Province of Arauco and from Mexico, El Salvador and Spain, among others.

== Climate ==
Lebu

Climate chart (precipitation, max. and min. temperature)
J	F	M	A	M	J	J	A	S	O	N	D
26 18 11	17 18 10	21 16 9	76 15 8	194 14 8	161 12 6	173 12 7	132 12 6	75 13 7	47 15 7	42 16 9	23 17 10
- █ Average max. and min. temperatures in °C
- █ Precipitation totals in mm
- Source: Weather 2 and World Weather Online average
Imperial conversion
J	F	M	A	M	J	J	A	S	O	N	D
1 64 51	0.6 64 50	0.8 61 48	3 59 46	7.6 56 46	6.3 53 43	6.8 53 44	5.2 54 43	3 55 44	1.8 58 45	1.7 60 47	0.9 62 49
- █ Average max. and min. temperatures in °F
- █ Precipitation totals in inches

Köppen-Geiger climate classification system classifies its climate as warm-summer Mediterranean (Csb).

== Demographics ==
As a commune, Lebu is a third-level administrative division of Chile administered by a municipal council, headed by an alcalde who is directly elected every four years. The 2008–2012 alcalde is Carlos González Anjari (PS).[1][2] Within the electoral divisions of Chile, Lebu is represented in the Chamber of Deputies by Manuel Monsalve (PS) and Iván Norambuena (UDI) as part of the 46th electoral district, (together with Lota, Arauco, Curanilahue, Los Álamos, Cañete, Contulmo and Tirúa). The commune is represented in the Senate by Victor Pérez Varela (UDI) and Mariano Ruiz -Esquide Jara (PDC) as part of the 13th senatorial constituency (Biobío-Coast).

== Administration ==
As a commune, Lebu is a third-level administrative division of Chile administered by a municipal council, headed by an alcalde who is directly elected every four years. The 2008–2012 alcalde is Carlos González Anjari (PS).

Within the electoral divisions of Chile, Lebu is represented in the Chamber of Deputies by Manuel Monsalve (PS) and Iván Norambuena (UDI) as part of the 46th electoral district, together with Lota, Arauco, Curanilahue, Los Álamos, Cañete, Contulmo and Tirúa. The commune is represented in the Senate by Victor Pérez Varela (UDI) and Mariano Ruiz-Esquide Jara (PDC) as part of the 13th senatorial constituency (Biobío-Coast).

== See also ==
- Media related to Category:Lebu at Wikimedia Commons
- Lebu Group
