= Tirúa =

- Town and Commune
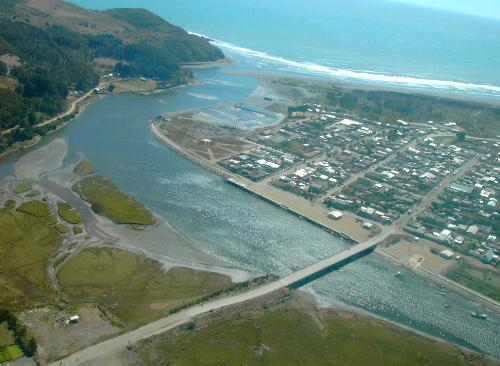
- Aerial view of Tirúa

- Coat of arms

- Map of the Tirúa commune in the Biobío Region

- Location in Chile
- Coordinates (town): 38°20′29″S 73°29′28″W
- Country: Chile
- Region: Biobío
- Province: Arauco
- Founded: 1865
- Founded as: Fuerte Tirúa (Fort Tirúa)

Government
  - Type: Municipality
  - Alcalde: José Aniñir Lepicheo (RN)

Area
  - Total: 624.4 km^{2} (241.1 sq mi)
- Elevation: 14 m (46 ft)

Population (2012 Census)
  - Total: 9,644
  - Density: 15.45/km^{2} (40.00/sq mi)
  - Urban: 2,508
  - Rural: 7,156

Sex
  - Men: 5,028
  - Women: 4,636
- Time zone: UTC-4 (CLT)
  - Summer (DST): UTC-3 (CLST)
- Area code: 56 + 41
- Climate: Csb
- Website: www.munitirua.cl

Tirúa (Spanish pronunciation: [tiˈɾu.a]) is a Chilean commune and town in Arauco Province, Biobío Region. The 2010 Chile earthquake led to a permanent uplift of Tirúa of about 180 cm above sea level, the highest recorded uplift related to the earthquake. This caused a large islet to form at the mouth of Tirúa River next to the town. The Misión Jesuita Mapuche is based in Tirúa.

== Demographics ==
According to the 2002 census of the National Statistics Institute, Tirúa spans an area of 624.4 km^{2} (241 sq mi) and has 9,664 inhabitants (5,028 men and 4,636 women). Of these, 2,508 (26%) lived in urban areas and 7,156 (74%) in rural areas. Between the 1992 and 2002 censuses, the population grew by 10.6% (928 persons).

== Administration ==
As a commune, Tirúa is a third-level administrative division of Chile administered by a municipal council, headed by an alcalde who is directly elected every four years. The 2017-2021 alcalde is Adolfo Millabur Ñancuil (Ind).

Within the electoral divisions of Chile, Tirúa is represented in the Chamber of Deputies by Manuel Monsalve Benavides (Socialist Party of Chile) and Iván Norambuena Farías (Independent Democratic Union) as part of the 46th electoral district, together with Lota, Lebu, Arauco, Curanilahue, Los Álamos, Cañete and Contulmo. The commune is represented in the Senate by Felipe Harboe Bascuñán from PPD and Víctor Pérez Varela of UDI as part of the 13th senatorial constituency (Biobío-Coast).
