= Contulmo =

- Town and Commune
- Coat of arms

- Map of the Contulmo commune in the Biobío Region

- Location in Chile
- Coordinates (city): 38°0′58″S 73°13′43″W
- Country: Chile
- Region: Biobío Region
- Province: Arauco Province

Government
  - Type: Municipality
  - Alcalde: Eduardo Aguayo Thiele (UDI)

Area
  - Total: 961.5 km^{2} (371.2 sq mi)
- Elevation: 25 m (82 ft)

Population (2012 Census)
  - Total: 5,515
  - Density: 5.736/km^{2} (14.86/sq mi)
  - Urban: 2,442
  - Rural: 3,396

Sex
  - Men: 3,020
  - Women: 2,818
- Time zone: UTC-4 (CLT)
  - Summer (DST): UTC-3 (CLST)
- Area code: country 56 + city 41
- Website: Municipality of Contulmo

Contulmo (Mapudungun: "place of transit") [konˈtulmo] is a Chilean town and commune in Arauco Province, Biobío Region. Colonized by Germans of Berlin since 1884.

== History ==
In December 1612, a group made up of three religious Jesuit missionaries and five Mapuche leaders were murdered by a fit of rage by the Mapuche leader Anganamón, from a nearby community, who wanted back some of his wives who had escaped from him. This event marked the end of the so-called "Defensive War", a military strategy of the Spanish Empire against the Mapuches in those territories during the Arauco War.

In 1884, a group of 48 Protestant German families arrived from Berlin and its surroundings, in the former Kingdom of Prussia. The German missionary ordained Methodist pastor in the United States but with a Lutheran training from his childhood and youth, Oskar von Barchwitz-Krauser, held conferences in the German capital to gather people who wanted to emigrate to the historic region of Araucanía, in Southern Chile, to found a community governed by Christian principles. The colonizers left from Berlin to Hamburg to embark to Liverpool, where after making a stop in Rio de Janeiro, they crossed the Strait of Magellan to reach the Chilean port of Talcahuano in April 1884. The urbanization tasks were difficult, in an area in the middle of the Coastal mountain range and with dense swamps and wooded vegetation. The first elected mayor of the commune of Contulmo was the German naturalized Chilean Paul Kortwich in 1918.

== Geography ==
Contulmo spans an area of 961.5 km^{2} (371 sq mi) It is bordered by the commune of Cañete to the north and northwest, Tirúa to the southwest, Purén to the east and Lumaco to the southeast.

The commune includes part of the lakes Lanalhue and Lleulleu. The town of Contulmo is surrounded by mountains and hills of the Nahuelbuta Range.

== Demographics ==
According to the 2002 census of the National Statistics Institute, Contulmo has 5,838 inhabitants (3,020 men and 2,818 women). Of these, 2,442 (41.8%) lived in urban areas and 3,396 (58.2%) in rural areas. The population fell by 13.3% (898 persons) between the 1992 and 2002 censuses.

== Culture ==
Main articles: German Chileans and German colonization of Valdivia, Osorno and Llanquihue

In architecture and urban design the town shows the German colonization. Every year in April is celebrated the "Fest der Kolonisten" which means "feast of the colonists" in German, and in December is the "Feast of the White Strawberry", among other festivities.

== Administration ==
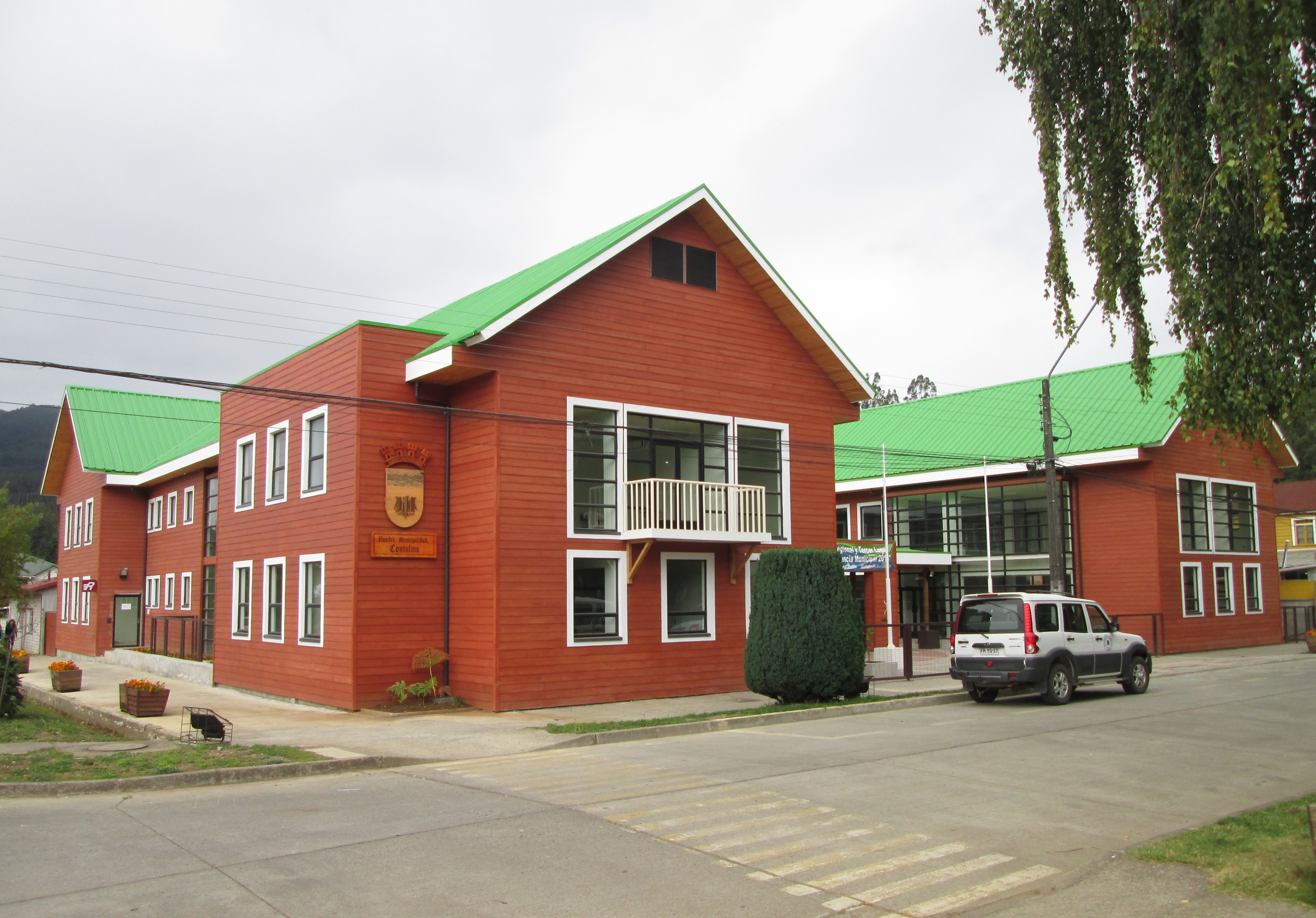
Contulmo Town Hall

As a commune, Contulmo is a third-level administrative division of Chile administered by a municipal council, headed by an alcalde who is directly elected every four years. The 2016-2020 alcalde is Mauricio Lebrecht Sperberg (UDI).

Within the electoral divisions of Chile, Contulmo is represented in the Chamber of Deputies by Manuel Monsalve (PS) and Iván Norambuena (UDI) as part of the 46th electoral district, together with Lota, Lebu, Arauco, Curanilahue, Los Álamos, Cañete and Tirúa. The commune is represented in the Senate by Victor Pérez Varela (UDI) and Mariano Ruiz-Esquide Jara (PDC) as part of the 13th senatorial constituency (Biobío-Coast).

== Climate ==
Climate data for Contulmo
| Month | Jan | Feb | Mar | Apr | May | Jun | Jul | Aug | Sep | Oct | Nov | Dec | Year |
|---|---|---|---|---|---|---|---|---|---|---|---|---|---|
| Mean daily maximum °C (°F) | 26.1 (79.0) | 25.7 (78.3) | 23.6 (74.5) | 20.1 (68.2) | 16.0 (60.8) | 13.6 (56.5) | 13.7 (56.7) | 15.6 (60.1) | 17.2 (63.0) | 19.6 (67.3) | 21.5 (70.7) | 23.8 (74.8) | 19.7 (67.5) |
| Daily mean °C (°F) | 17.1 (62.8) | 16.6 (61.9) | 15.0 (59.0) | 12.9 (55.2) | 10.7 (51.3) | 9.1 (48.4) | 8.9 (48.0) | 9.3 (48.7) | 10.3 (50.5) | 12.2 (54.0) | 13.9 (57.0) | 15.7 (60.3) | 12.6 (54.8) |
| Mean daily minimum °C (°F) | 9.8 (49.6) | 9.7 (49.5) | 8.8 (47.8) | 7.6 (45.7) | 6.3 (43.3) | 5.3 (41.5) | 5.0 (41.0) | 4.8 (40.6) | 5.5 (41.9) | 6.5 (43.7) | 7.8 (46.0) | 9.0 (48.2) | 7.2 (44.9) |
| Average precipitation mm (inches) | 38.1 (1.50) | 42.8 (1.69) | 85.5 (3.37) | 142.6 (5.61) | 294.7 (11.60) | 331.1 (13.04) | 308.4 (12.14) | 239.2 (9.42) | 161.7 (6.37) | 91.6 (3.61) | 98.5 (3.88) | 61.9 (2.44) | 1,896.1 (74.67) |
| Average relative humidity (%) | 76 | 78 | 81 | 84 | 86 | 87 | 86 | 84 | 82 | 81 | 79 | 77 | 82 |
Source: Bioclimatografia de Chile
