= Los Álamos =

- City and Commune
- Coat of arms Commune of Los Álamos in the Biobío Region Location in Chile
- Coordinates (city): 37°37′38″S 73°27′43″W
- Country: Chile
- Region: Biobío
- Province: Arauco

Government
  - Type: Municipality
  - Alcalde: Jorge Fuentes

Area
  - Total: 599.1 km^{2} (231.3 sq mi)
- Elevation: 177 m (581 ft)

Population (2012 Census)
  - Total: 19,494
  - Density: 32.54/km^{2} (84.28/sq mi)
  - Urban: 16,394
  - Rural: 2,238
- Demonym: Alameño/a

Sex
  - Men: 9,456
  - Women: 9,176
- Time zone: UTC−4 (CLT)
  - Summer (DST): UTC−3 (CLST)
- Area code: country 56 + city 41
- Website: www.losalamos.cl (in Spanish)

Los Álamos is a Chilean commune and city in Arauco Province, Biobío Region.

== Demographics ==
According to the 2002 census of the National Statistics Institute, Los Álamos spans an area of 599.1 km^{2} (231 sq mi) and has 18,632 inhabitants (9,456 men and 9,176 women). Of these, 16,394 (88%) lived in urban areas and 2,238 (12%) in rural areas. Between the 1992 and 2002 censuses, the population grew by 10.4% (1,762 persons).

The commune includes the locality of Antihuala.

=== Religion ===
The 2024 census reported that among people aged 15 or older in Los Álamos, 62.3% were evangelical Christians, 20.7% did not practice any religion, and 14.4% were Catholic. None of the remaining religions reached 1%. As a result, Los Álamos is the commune in Chile with the highest percentage of evangelical Christians, accounting for 10,918 people.

== Administration ==
As a commune, Los Álamos is a third-level administrative division of Chile administered by a municipal council, headed by an alcalde who is directly elected every four years. The 2008-2012 alcalde is Lautaro Melita Vinett (PS). Since 2013 and until the present the alcalde of Los Álamos is Jorge Fuentes Fetis

Within the electoral divisions of Chile, Los Álamos is represented in the Chamber of Deputies by Manuel Monsalve (PS) and Iván Norambuena (UDI) as part of the 46th electoral district, together with Lota, Lebu, Arauco, Curanilahue, Cañete, Contulmo and Tirúa. The commune is represented in the Senate by Victor Pérez Varela (UDI) and Mariano Ruiz-Esquide Jara (PDC) as part of the 13th senatorial constituency (Biobío-Coast).

== Culture ==
In the literary field, Los Álamos stands out for its poets. Among these, one can name René Briones Sandoval, Maribel Castro Vergara, Olga Ester Garrido, Marta Díaz Pereira, María Rocha, Manuel Castro, Mac Karo, who were anthologized in the magazine Chonchón n°39, published in September 2020. In addition, During the years 2018 and 2019, the poets of Los Álamos participated in the I and II Latin American Meeting of Poets and Narrators in Lebu, events that included the presence of authors from the Province of Arauco, such as Lidia Mansilla Valenzuela and Alejandro Concha M., and from abroad, such as Jorge Canales and Amapola, from El Salvador, Chary Gumeta and José Baroja, from Mexico, and Felicidad Batista, from Spain, among other participants.
