= Arauco Province =

Province in the Bío Bío Region, Chile

Arauco Province Provincia de Arauco
- Province
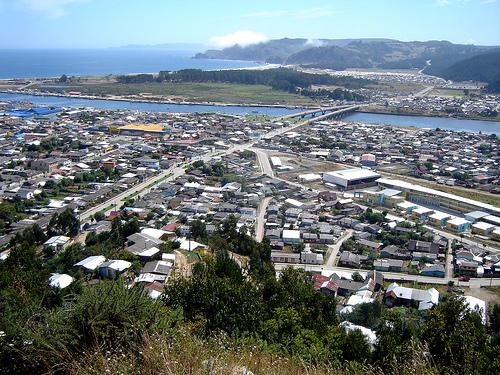
- General view of Lebu

- Seal

- Location in Biobío Region

- Location in Chile
- Coordinates: 37°46′S 73°20′W
- Country: Chile
- Region: Bío Bío
- Capital: Lebu
- Communes: List of 7: Arauco; Cañete; Contulmo; Curanilahue; Lebu; Los Álamos; Tirúa

Government
  - Type: Provincial

Area
  - Total: 5,643.3 km^{2} (2,178.9 sq mi)

Population (2024 Census)
  - Total: 166,231
  - Density: 29.456/km^{2} (76.292/sq mi)
- Time zone: UTC−4 (CLT)
  - Summer (DST): UTC-3 (CLST)
- Area code: 56 + 41
- Website: www.gobernacionarauco.gov.cl

Arauco Province (Spanish: Provincia de Arauco) is one of three provinces of the Bío Bío Region in Chile. It spans an area of 5,643.3 km^{2} (2,178.9 sq mi). Its capital is Lebu. It had a population of 166,231 inhabitants as per the 2024 Chilean census.

== History ==
The Biobio Region was established on 10 July 1974, by Law No. 575, which reorganised Chile into thirteen regions. The region is divided into three provinces–Arauco, Biobío, and Concepción, which are further divided into 33 communes.

== Geography ==
Arauco Province is one of the three provinces of the Biobio Region in Chile. It covers an area of 5,643.3 km^{2} (2,178.9 sq mi). It borders the provinces of Concepción to the north, Biobío to the east, Cautin to the south and borders the Pacific Ocean to the west. Almost half of the land area consists of coastal plains, and roughly quarter of them are made up of offshore islands, with the remaining forming part of the Carampangue and Lebu River basins.

The province consists of plain surrounded by the Nahuelbuta Mountains to the east, and low lying hills that slope towards the coast on the west. The region has significant forest cover, with a number of lakes, the major of which are the Lleu-lleu and Lanalhue lakes. Its capital is at Lebu, located along the coast.

The province has a Mediterranean climate (Köppen climate classification: Csb) with an average annual temperature of 17.14 °C (62.85 °F). The region receives approximately 14.02 cm (5.52 in) of rainfall annually on average.

== Administration ==
As a province, Arauco is a second-level administrative division of Chile, governed by a provincial governor. It is further subdivided into seven communes (comunas)–Arauco, Cañete, Contulmo, Curanilahue, Lebu, Los Álamos, and Tirúa.

== Demographics ==
According to the 2024 Chilean census, the province had a population of 166,231 inhabitants. The population consisted of 85,512 females (51.4%) and 80,719 males (48.6%). About 19.1% of the population was below the age of 15 years, 66.4% belonged to the age group of 15–64 years, and 14.5% was aged 65 years or older. The province had an urban population of 118,792 inhabitants (71.5%) and a rural population of 47,439 inhabitants (28.5%).

Most of the residents were born in Chile, accounting for 164,774 inhabitants (99.1%). Non-indigenous people formed the majority of the population with 121,533 inhabitants (73.1%), while 44,684 inhabitants (26.9%) identified themselves as belonging to indigenous groups. Evangelicals or Protestants formed the largest religious group with 73,889 adherents (55%), followed by 29,115 Roman Catholics (21.7%), and 28,132 inhabitants (20.9%) indicating no religious affiliation. The region has a high rate of poverty and unemployment. This Province has historically high poverty levels. According to a 2013 survey, 16.7% of the population were in poverty, higher than the regional (12.3%) and national average (7.8%).
