= Lota, Chile =

Lota
- City and Commune
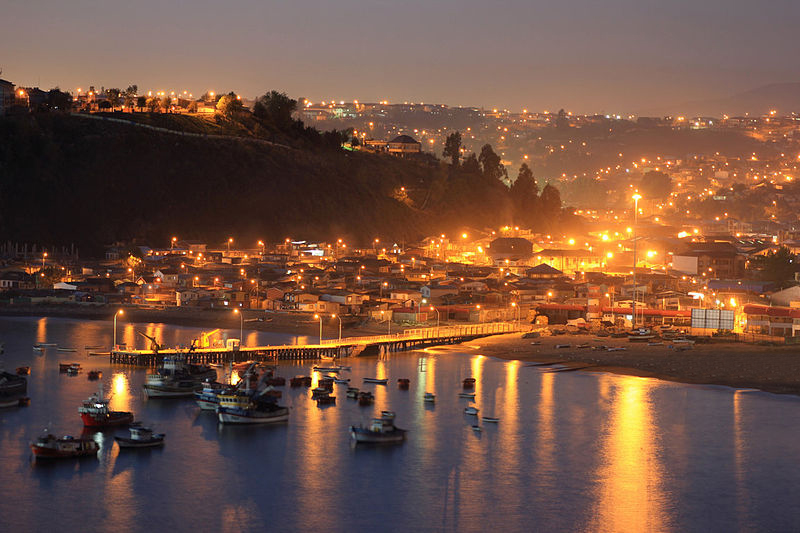
- Dusk in Lota

- Coat of arms Location of Lota commune in the Biobío Region Location in Chile
- Coordinates: 37°05′S 73°10′W
- Country: Chile
- Region: Biobío
- Province: Concepción
- Founded: 1662
- Founded as: Santa María de Guadalupe

Government
  - Type: Municipality
  - Alcalde: Jaime Vásquez Castillo (ChV)

Area
  - Total: 135.8 km^{2} (52.4 sq mi)
- Elevation: 82 m (269 ft)

Population (2012 Census)
  - Total: 47,339
  - Density: 348.6/km^{2} (902.9/sq mi)
  - Urban: 48,975
  - Rural: 114

Sex
  - Men: 23,944
  - Women: 25,145
- Time zone: UTC−4 (CLT)
  - Summer (DST): UTC−3 (CLST)
- Postal code: 4210000
- Area code: 56 + 41
- Website: Official website (in Spanish)

Lota is a city and commune located in the center of Chile on the Gulf of Arauco (in Spanish), in the southern Concepción Province of the Biobío Region, 39 kilometres (24 mi) south of Concepción, and is one of the ten cities (communes) that constitutes the Concepción metropolitan area. The city is mostly known for being the traditional centre of coal mining in Chile, although mining ended in the 1990s.

== History ==
The first Spanish settlement at this site, Santa Maria de Guadalupe, was founded by the governor Ángel de Peredo on October 12, 1662, but it did not survive long amidst the hostilities of the Arauco War. The modern city is linked to the coal mining industry that started in the nineteenth century. The first coal seams to be exploited were easy to work because they lay almost at ground level. Coal mining started after the arrival of steamships at the port of Talcahuano. These steam ships, mostly from Britain, initially bought the coal very cheaply. Industrialist Matías Cousiño begun mining operations in Lota in 1852. Coal mining transformed Lota from being a sparsely populated frontier zone in the mid-19th century into a large industrial hub that attracted immigrants from all over Chile well into the 20th century.

Lota was established officially as a town on January 5, 1875, and became a city on November 30, 1881. The name Lota is thought to be derived from the Mapudungun word Louta meaning small piece of land.

In 1960 miners and their families started a general strike demanding higher salaries. As protesters marched on Concepción the 1960 Concepción earthquake struck the territory ending the strike. During much of the 20th century the city was a stronghold of pro-Soviet communism. The city's coal mines were nationalized in 1971 by Salvador Allende, a move that was welcomed by miners. When Allende was overthrown and a military dictatorship established, Lota's political parties and powerful trade unions were forbidden. People active in these organizations were persecuted, and in some instances killed by the military. Much of the local press was suppressed as it had links to either the trade unions or political parties.

In the late 20th century Lota's coal industry began to struggle for markets as furnaces, the shipping industry and trains, all of which were important buyers of coal, shifted to other energy sources. There had been concerns as early as the 1920s about the vulnerability of the coal-dependent local economy. One of the problems of Lota's coal industry was difficulty in mechanizing as the coal beds were thin in nature and displaced by many geological faults. Costs also increased as wooden mining supports became more expensive, easily accessible coal beds were depleted and mining had to be done below the sea bed. The mines were closed in the 1990s after demand for Lota's coal resources diminished and cheaper Colombian coal arrived on the market, plunging the residents of Lota into poverty. The end came in 1997 when Empresa Nacional del Carbón closed the mines and sold the industrial equipment. Subsequently, the mines flooded.

Tourism, forestry, artisan fishing and small-scale entrepreneurship have replaced mining as sources of employment, but older miners have found it difficult to adapt. Despite the decline of the coal industry, the Lota community continues to identify with it. Compared to the 1960s and 1970s the city is very much depoliticized; evidence of this is the fact some evangelical churches have more attendants than the offices of political parties.

== Points of interest ==
- Playa de Colcura
- Chivilingo Hydroelectric Plant
- El Chiflón del Diablo

== Demographics ==
According to the 2002 census of the National Statistics Institute, Lota spans an area of 135.8 km^{2} (52 sq mi) and has 49,089 inhabitants (23,944 men and 25,145 women). Of these, 48,975 (99.8%) lived in urban areas and 114 (0.2%) in rural areas. The population fell by 2.3% (1167 persons) between the 1992 and 2002 censuses. In the last years of the 2000s the population fell below 40,000 meaning that the population had halved since the 1980s when it was about 80,000.

== Administration ==
As a commune, Lota is a third-level administrative division of Chile administered by a municipal council, headed by an alcalde who is directly elected every four years. The 2008-2012 alcalde was Patricio Marchant Ulloa (PDC).

Within the electoral divisions of Chile, Lota has been represented in the Chamber of Deputies by Manuel Monsalve (PS) and Iván Norambuena (UDI) as part of the 46th electoral district, (comprising Lota, Lebu, Arauco, Curanilahue, Los Álamos, Cañete, Contulmo and Tirúa). The commune has been represented in the Senate by Victor Pérez Varela (UDI) and Mariano Ruiz -Esquide Jara (PDC) as part of the 13th senatorial constituency (Biobío-Coast).
