= Antuco =

Antuco may refer to:

- Antuco (volcano), in Chile
- Antuco, Chile
- Antuco Hydroelectric Plant
- Tragedy of Antuco
