= Hiking in Chile =

Hiking in Chile is characterized by a wide range of environments and climates for hikers, which largely results from Chile's unusual, ribbon-like shape, which is 4,300 kilometres (2,700 miles) long and on average 175 kilometres (109 miles) wide. These range from the world's driest desert, the Atacama, in the north, through a Mediterranean climate in the center, to the glaciers, fjords and lakes of Patagonia in the south.

The longest hiking trail in Chile is the informal 3,000 km (1,850 mi) Greater Patagonian Trail that was created by a non-governmental initiative.

== National trail network ==
The Sendero de Chile (“Chilean Trail”) project was launched in the year 2000 by the Chilean government to celebrate the country's 2010 bicentenary of independence from Spain. It aimed to provide access to “Chile’s most awe inspiring landscapes and cultures, from the heights of the altiplano, with its volcanoes and salt flats, to the end of the American continent.” It was announced that the national trail network Sendero de Chile (“Chilean Trail”) will provide signposted paths through the length of Chile covering approximately 8,500 km of trails.

The trail divides the country into nine hiking zones:

- Iquique and Tarapacá
- Calama
- Atacama Coast
- Central Andes
- Alto Bío Bío
- Andean Araucanía
- Valdivian Forest
- Patagonia Aysén
- Última Esperanza

The ambitious plans suffered substantial setbacks and no continuous longer trail was created. The foundation "Sendero de Chile" focuses now on environmental education.

== Iquique and Tarapacá ==
Iquique is an important port city in the far north of Chile and is the capital of the country's Tarapacá Region. Terrain in Tarapacá includes the Pacific coast, the dry Atacama desert and the salt flats and volcanoes of the Andean altiplano.

There is currently one Sendero de Chile trail in this zone, the Kala Uta trail.

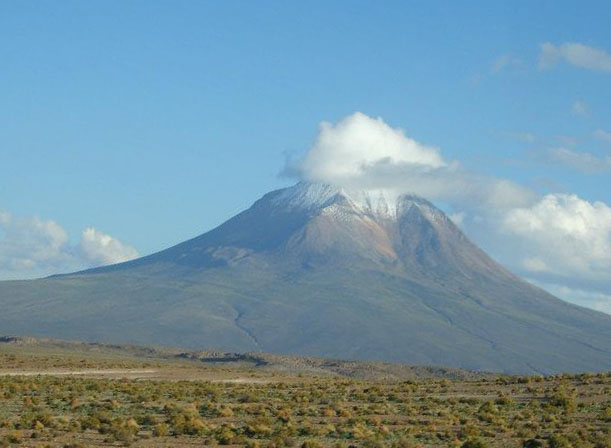
Nevado Cariquima volcano

=== Kala Uta ===
This trail stretches 26 km south from the small town of Colchane, just outside the Volcán Isluga National Park, to the village of Cariquima. The trail reaches altitudes of 3,700 meters above sea level and points of interest include the church of Achauta, dating from the start of the 20th century; historic Aymara architecture at Kalcachu, the Cariquima River and es:Nevado Cariquima volcano.

== Calama ==
Calama is an inland city in the Antofagasta Region in the north of Chile, lying to the south of Tarapacá. It is surrounded by the Atacama Desert and lies approximately 100 km from the popular tourist town of San Pedro de Atacama.

There is currently one Sendero de Chile trail in this zone, the Pukará Lasana – Puente Del Diablo trail.

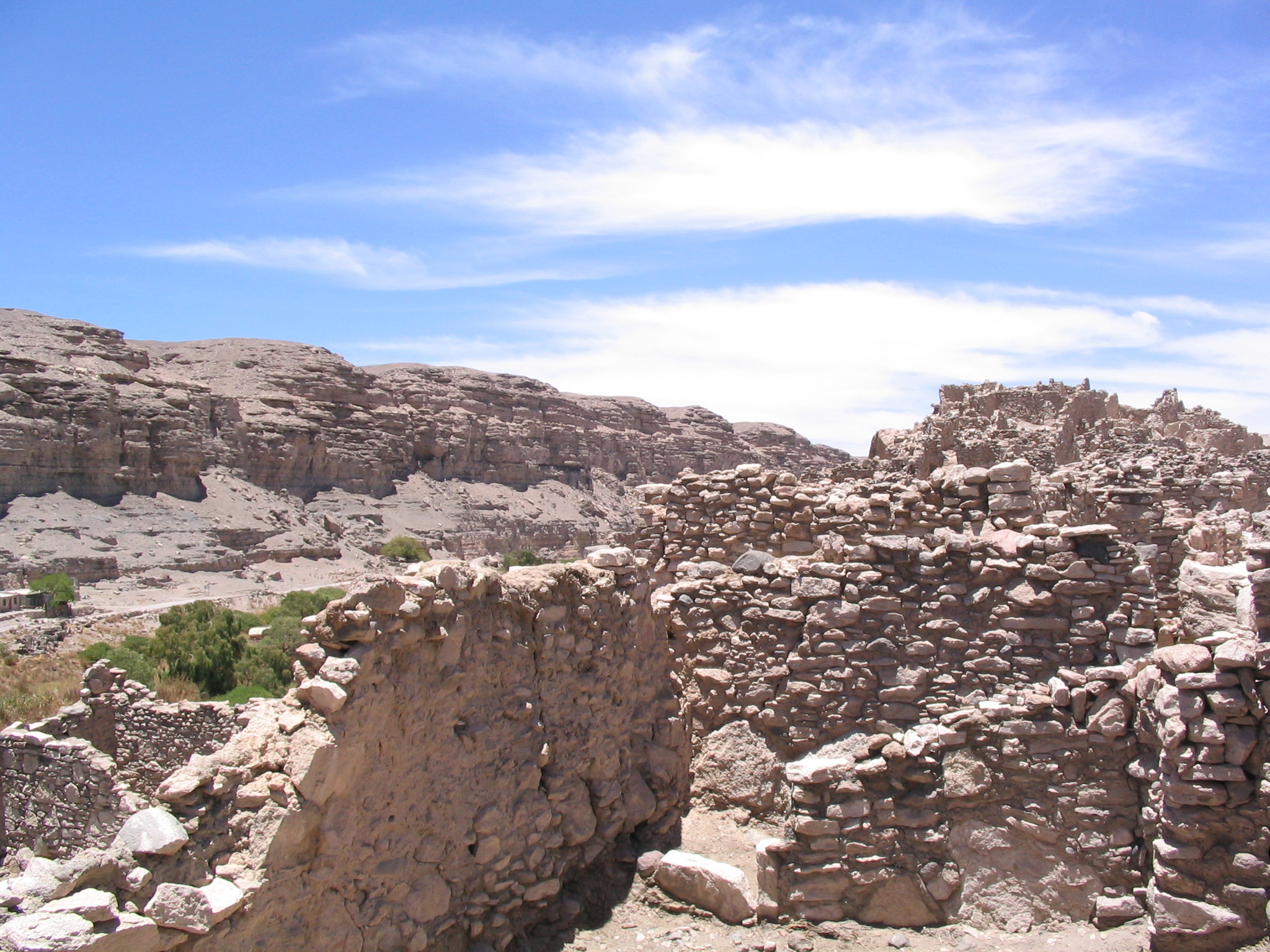
Pukará de Lasana

=== Pukará Lasana – Puente Del Diablo ===
This trail stretches 30 km from the pukará monument, north-east of Calama, via the village of Chiu Chiu to the Puente del Diablo (“devil’s bridge”), a natural bridge stretching over the Salado River. The trail passes several tourist attractions: the Pukará Lasana; petroglyphs dating from 3000 BC; the Laguna Inca Coya, an aquamarine lagoon considered sacred by indigenous communities; and the Puente del Diablo, stretching over a 20 meter deep canyon.

== Atacama Coast ==
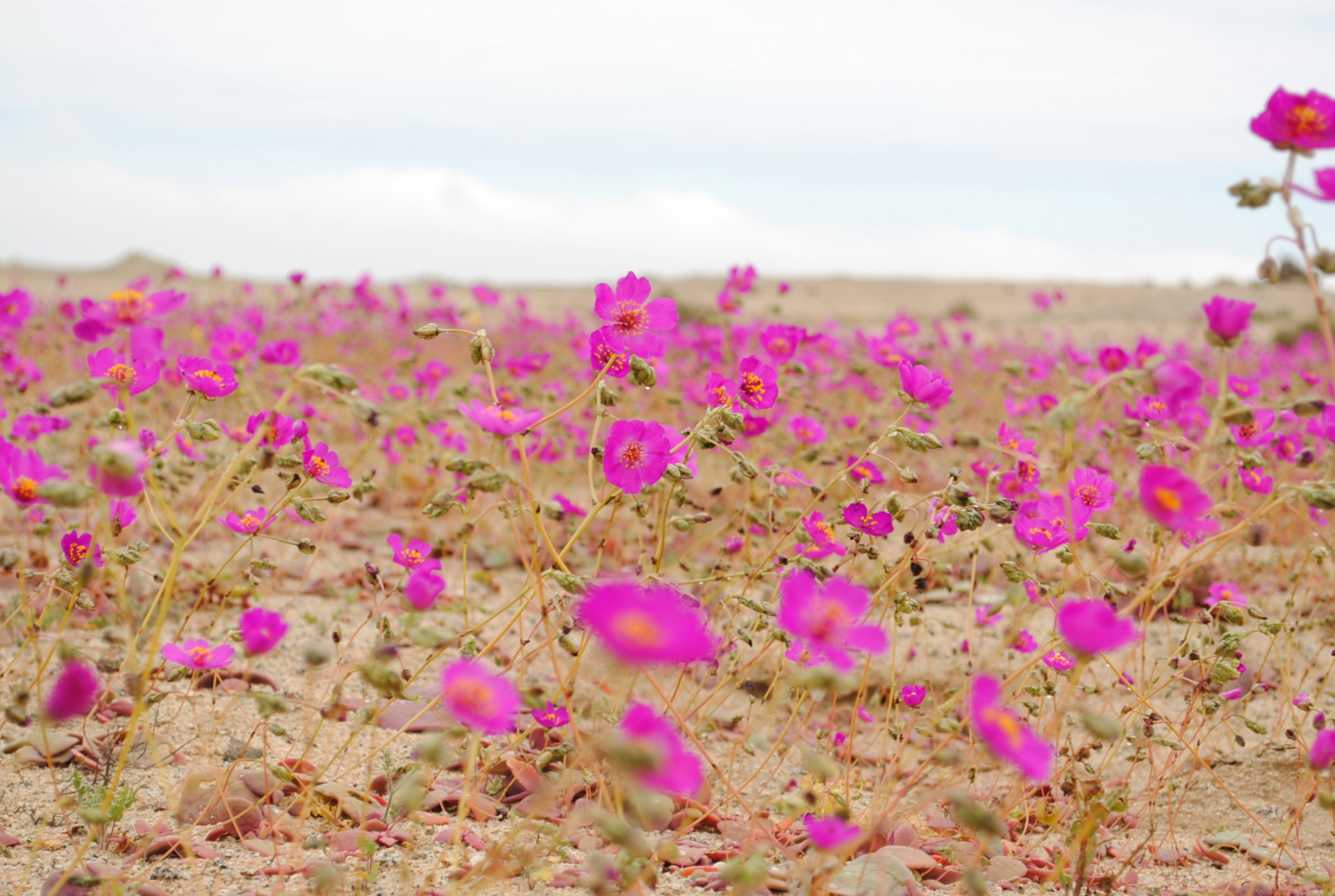
The Desierto Florido

This zone covers the coastal stretch of Chile's Atacama Region, where the Atacama Desert meets the Pacific Ocean. One popular attraction in the region is the Desierto Florido (“Flowering Desert”), where occasional higher-than-average rainfall in July and August can bring up to 200 kinds of desert plants into bloom between the months of September and November.

The Sendero de Chile currently has one trail in this zone, the Morro de Bahía Inglesa.

=== Morro de Bahía Inglesa ===
This trail, which translates as Bahía Inglesa Headland, is a collection of one long 20 km walk and three shorter walks on various parts of the headland. The four trails pass several viewpoints – the Quebrada Chorrillos viewpoint, the Isla Grande viewpoint, the Portada Sur viewpoint and the Portal Norte viewpoint – as well as a variety of beaches. It is possible to see a wide range of local wildlife, including guanacos, kelp gulls, grey gulls and cacti.

== Central Andes ==
The Central Andes zone centers on the Chilean capital, Santiago, stretching up to Limarí in the north and down to San Fernando in the south.

There are currently eight Sendero de Chile trails in this semi-arid Andean zone: Samo Alto, Orolonco, Rio Olivares, Parque Mahuida, Parque Aguas De Ramón, Sendero de las Grandes Travesías, Reserva Río Clarillo and Reserva Río Cipreses.

=== Samo Alto ===
The Samo Alto trail, located between Ovalle and Andacollo, is divided into two parts: the first covers 15 km between the villages of Samo Alto and San Pedro de Pichasa; the second covers 12 km from Samo Alto to the traditional village of Las Minillas. The first part offers views of the Cerro El Reloj, whose name (“Clock Hill”) comes from the laborers who used to use the sun on the mountain to tell the time, and extends north east via the El Espinal village and the Hurtado River up to the Pichasa Natural Monument, an area of protected natural landscape. The second part runs south east and takes in the Las Tinajas pre-Columbian archeological site.

=== Orolonco ===
The Orolonco trail is found near the towns of San Felipe, Chile and Los Andes and close to Chile Route 60, which leads to the Paso Internacional Los Libertadores border crossing between Chile and Argentina. The trail extends 25 km from the Parque Escultórico Cementerio las Carretas (Las Carretas Cemetery Sculpture Park) to the Meseta de Jahuel viewpoint. Points of interest along the trail include the sculpture park itself, the Parque de Huasos Sahondé (Sahondé Cowboys park), the Santuario de Cristo de Rinconada de Silva, where the traditional Virgen del Carmen festival takes place, views of Cerro Orolonco and its many small waterfalls, Cerro Zaino, with its olive plantations, and the pre-Columbian architectural zone of Jaheul. ThisisChile.cl calls the area a “typical rural ‘’huaso’’ zone.”

=== Río Olivares ===
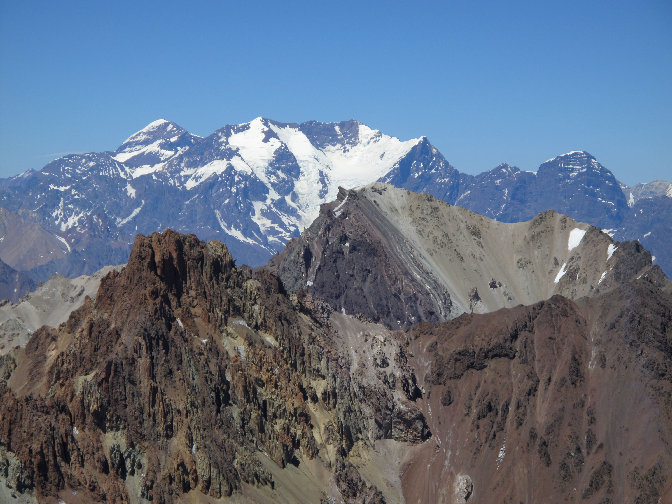
The snowy peak of Cerro Juncal

The Rio Olivares (Olivares River) trail runs through the Parque Río Olivares, located in the Andes due east of Santiago, and extends 27 km from the Bocatoma Río Olivares to the 200 m high Salto Grande waterfall and back again. There are several viewpoints on the hike overlooking mountains such as Cerro El Plomo, which, at 5,424 meters, is the highest peak visible from Santiago on a clear day.

=== Parque Mahuida ===
Mahuida municipal park is located on the southeastern edge of Santiago, where the commune of La Reina meets the foothills of the Andes. The entrance to the park is marked by a Sendero de Chile sign and the trail runs in a 5 km circuitous track.

=== Parque Aguas de Ramón ===
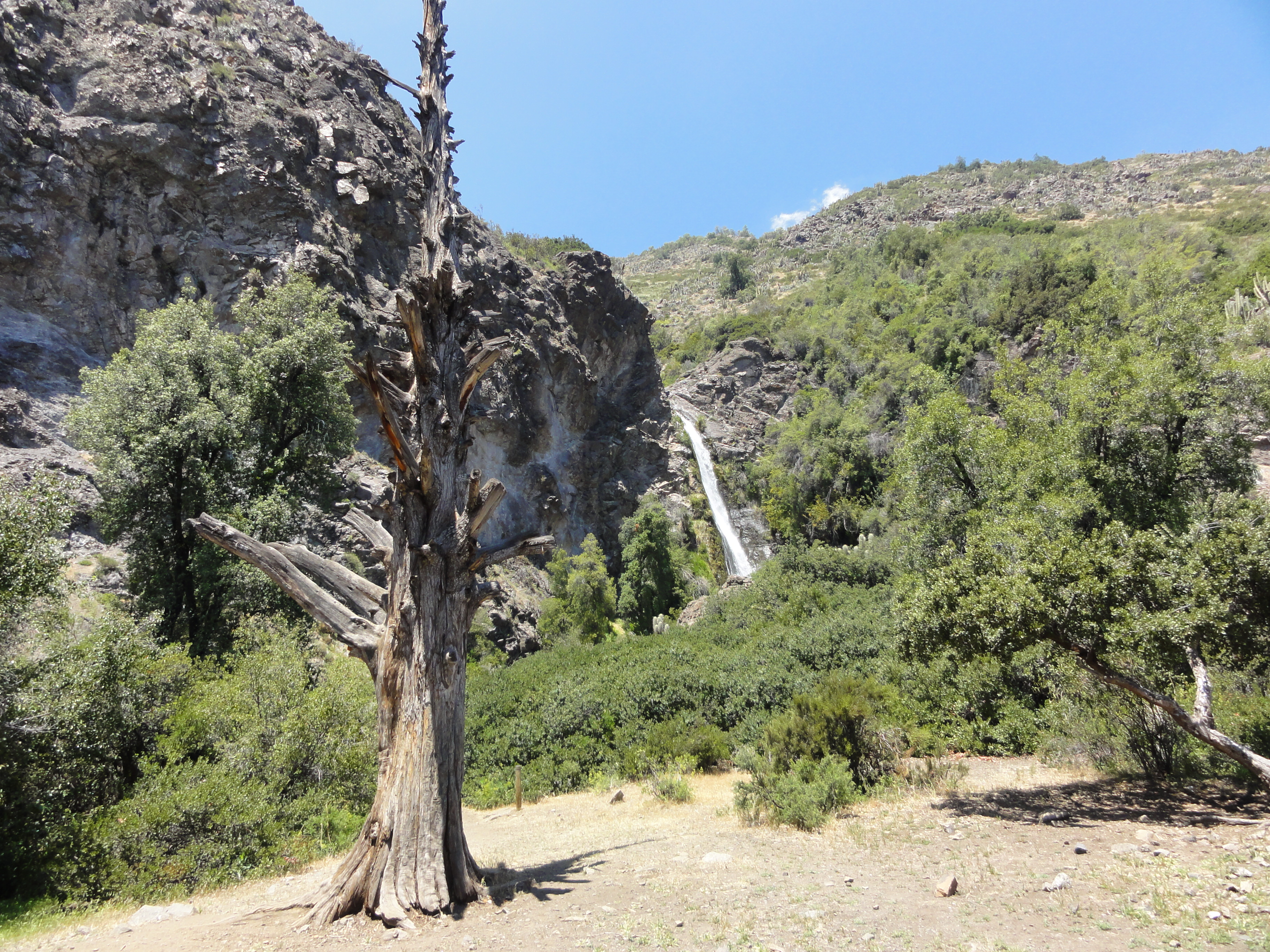
Salto de Apoquindo waterfall

The Aguas de Ramón Natural Park is also located on the eastern edge of Santiago, slightly to the north of Mahuida park. There are two main hikes in the Parque Aguas de Ramón: the 6.2 km circuitous Los Peumos hike and the 17.2 km circuitous Salto de Apoquindo hike. The Los Peumos trail runs from the park entrance around the edge of the Quebrada de Ramón (Ramoón Canyon) and back to the park entrance. The Salto de Apoquindo hike starts and ends on the same trail as the Los Peumos hike, but takes a steeper and more arduous detour to the 30 meter Salto de Apoquindo waterfall. Points of interest include native peumo tree forests, views of the waterfall and the 3,253 meter Cerro de Ramón mountain, and the opportunity to view condors, eagles, chimango caracaras and occasionally foxes and viscachas.

=== Sendero de las Grandes Travesías (Cerro San Cristóbal) ===
This trail leads through Santiago's Parque Metropolitano, which contains the well-known Cerro San Cristóbal that rises 800 AMSL in the center of this city. The 9.5 km trail begins on the southwest side of the hill, circles below the summit to the eastern side of the hill and then runs north to the exit in the Mirador el Sauce sector, near the Camino La Pirámide. Points of interest include the National Zoo, two public swimming pools and a funicular which dates from 1925.

=== Reserva Río Clarillo ===
The Río Clarillo National Reserve lies 45 km southeast of Santiago in the valley of the Clarillo River. The 10 km Sendero de Chile trail runs from the reserve's El Maitén sector to the Corral de las Yeguas sector. Points of interest include a viewpoint overlooking the Clarillo valley and stands of native cacti, soap bark trees, peumo trees and Lithraea caustica trees. It is also possible to view culpeos and South American gray foxes.

=== Reserva Río Cipreses ===
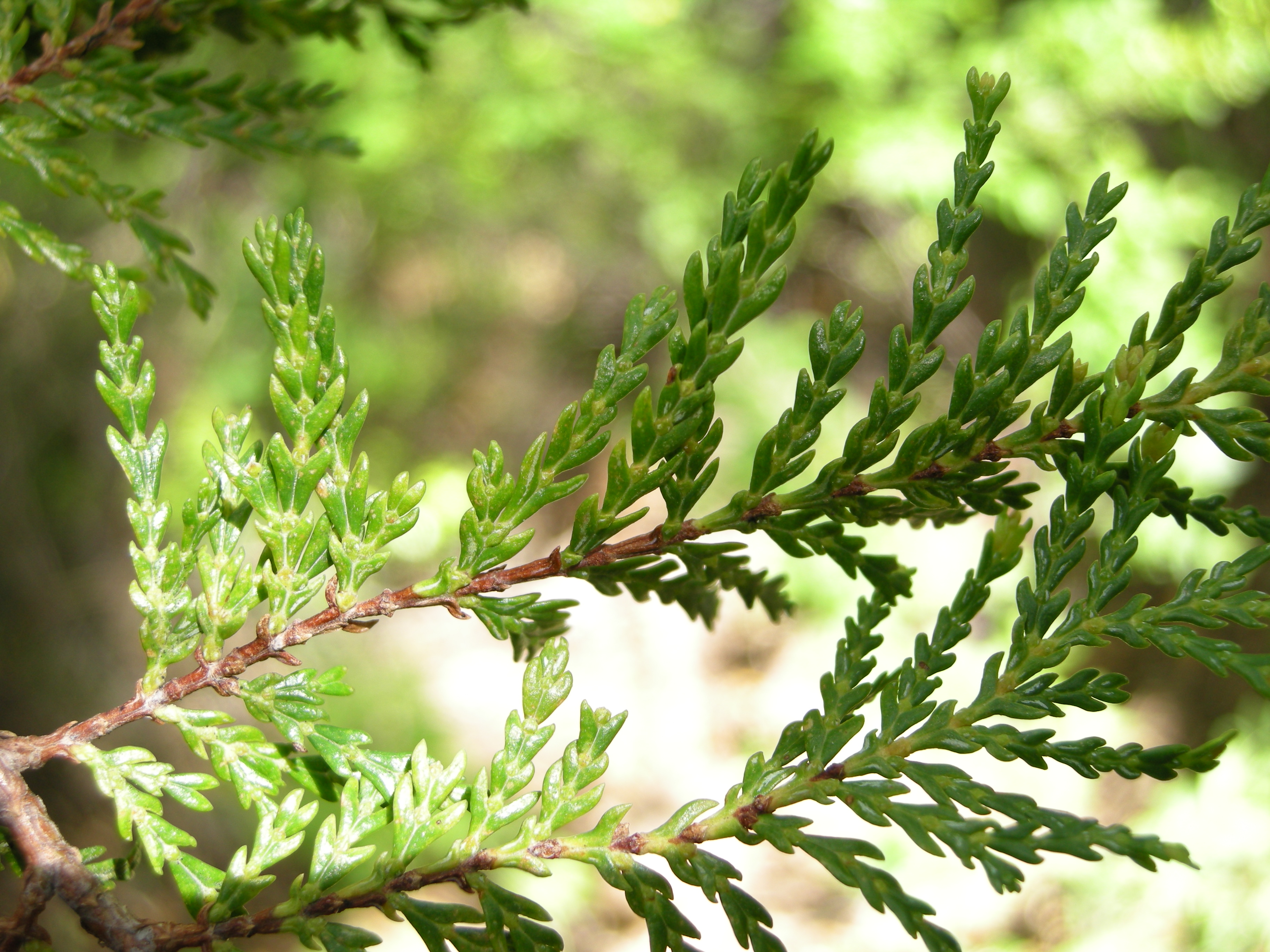
Cordilleran cypress

The Río Cipreses Reserve is located southeast of the city of Rancagua and approximately 140 km south of Santiago. The 35 km trail runs from the park administration center to the Sector Agua de Vida, via the Sector de Ranchillo, with campsite and refreshment facilities, the Vuelta de la Guardia viewpoint, and the El Indio sector, with its nearby refuge and campsite. Points of interest include petroglyphs dating back to 1400 AD in the El Indio sector, views of the Cipreses Glacier and El Palomo Volcano, and the opportunity to see guanacos, condors, burrowing parrots and austrocedrus trees, also known as the Cordilleran cypress.

== Alto Bío Bío ==
South of the Central Andes, the Alto Bío Bío area covers the Andean surroundings of the upper Bío Bío River, Chile's second largest river, in the Bío Bío Region. The area is a center for the indigenous Pehuenche people and currently contains two Sendero de Chile trails, as well as other important parks such as Ñuble National Reserve.

=== Parque Nacional Laguna del Laja ===
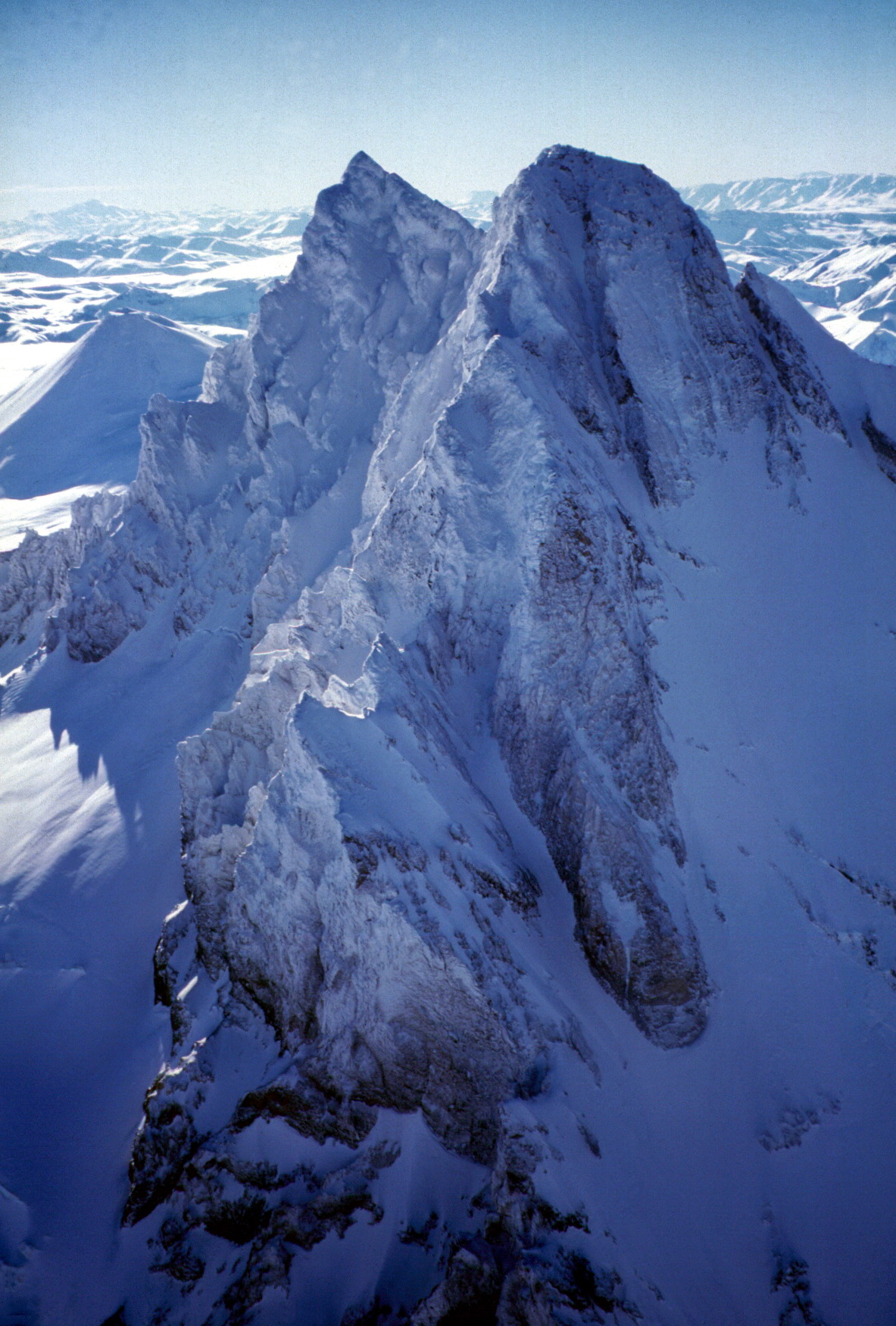
Sierra Velluda

The trail comprises four sections, with three shorter hikes (Los Pangues – Los Tatas, 5 km; Circuito Las Chilcas – El Torbellino, 2 km; and El Toro – Laguna del Laja, 4 km) and one longer hike (Laguna del Laja – Los Barros, 24 km). It starts from the Control Hut in the Los Pangues section of the park and runs round the north-east base of the Antuco Volcano and the south-west shore of the Laguna del Laja lake down to the lake's southernmost point. Highlights include panoramic views of the lake, the volcano and Sierra Velluda, the highest peak in Chile's Bío Bío Region. The trail can be traversed either on foot or on horseback.

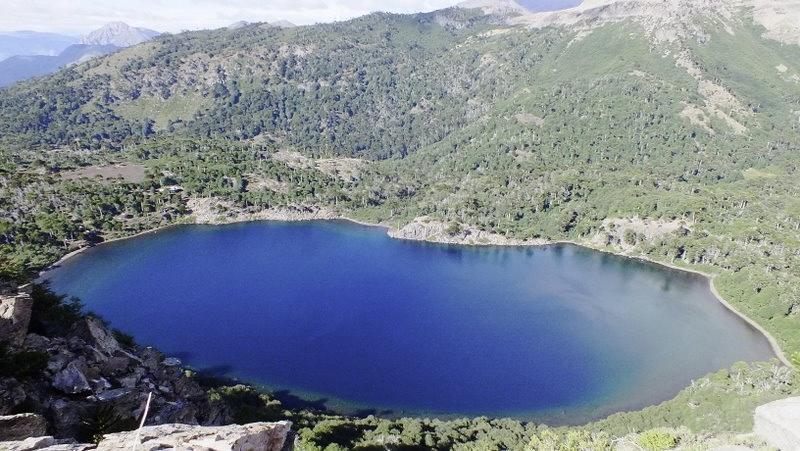
Laguna La Mula

=== Reserva Ralco ===
This 26 km trail runs north through the Ralco National Reserve from the Chilean National Forest Corporation (Conaf) lodge at Quillaicahue up to the Laguna La Mula mountain lake and beyond. It can only be traversed on horseback with a local guide. It is possible to view a wide variety of local wildlife, both plant and animal, and the trail offers views of Laguna La Mula, Salto Loncotahue waterfall, the Callaqui Volcano (3,095 m.a.s.l), Cerro Ruca Cherrube mountain and the Ralco River. Two local indigenous Pehuenche communities live within the reserve: the Ralco Lepoy community and the Quepuca Ralco community.

== Arauncanía Andina ==
The “Andean Araucanía” area is located in Chile's Araucanía Region and includes various national parks, such as Nahuelbuta, Tolhuaca, Conguillío, Villarrica and Huerquehue, and national reserves, such as Malalcahuello-Nalcas and Alto Bío Bío (in the Araucanía Region not the Bío Bío, despite its name). The region is famous for the araucaria tree, Chile's national tree, also known as the “monkey puzzle” or “monkey tail” tree. It is also home to the well-known tourist town of Pucón and four volcanoes: Llaima, Villarrica, Quetrupillan and Lanin.

The two Sendero de Chile hikes in the region are:

=== Parque Nacional Conguillío ===
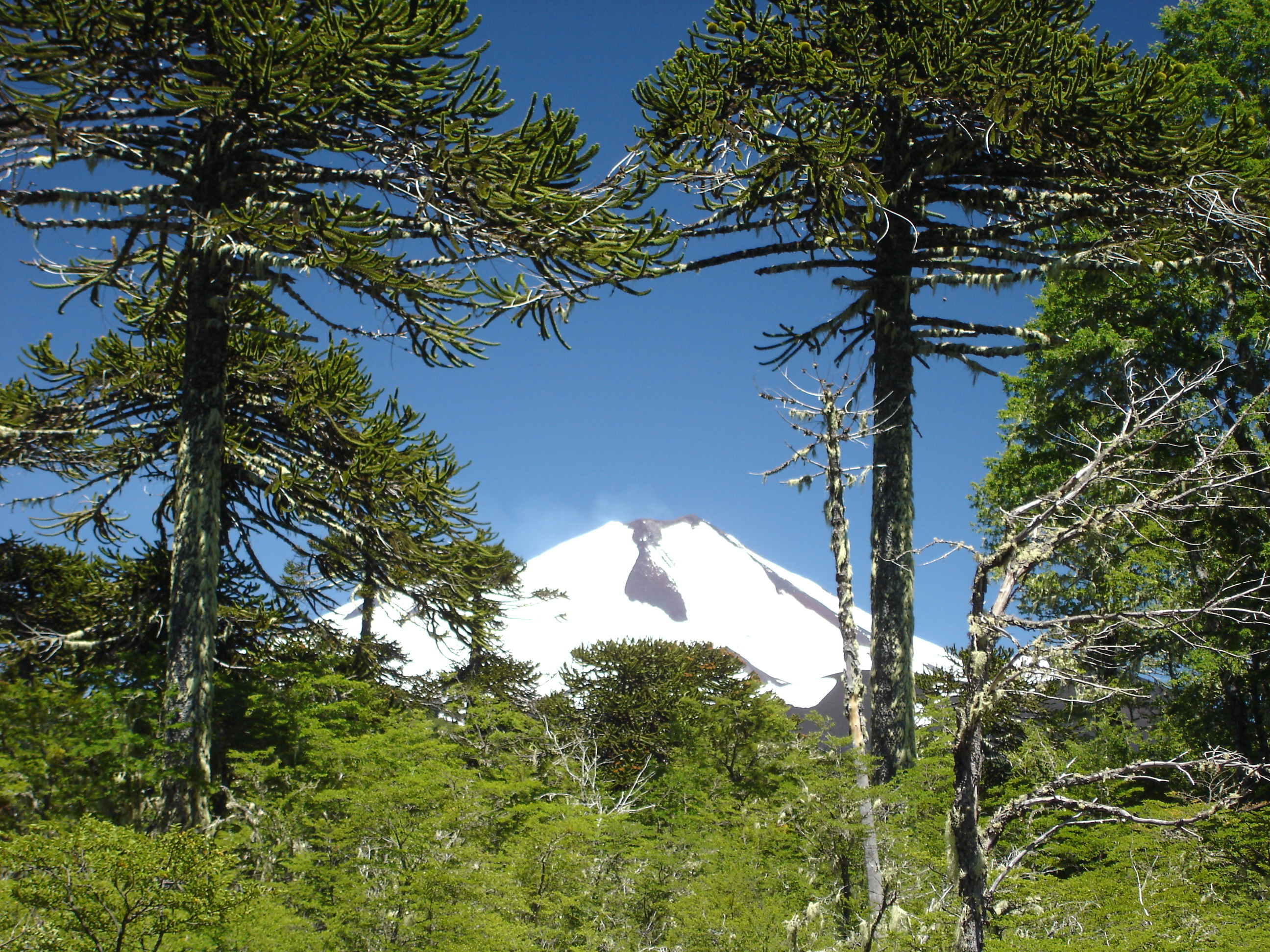
Llaima Volcano in Parque Nacional Conguillío

Popular Conguillío National Park is located approximately 70 km east of the city of Temuco and this trail runs 54 km round Llaima Volcano north from the Salto de Truful Truful waterfall to the Laguna Captren lake. It is possible to see a wide variety of wildlife in the park, including pumas, South American grey foxes, culpeos, lesser grisons, kodkods, pudús, viscachas and coypus. Birds living in the area include eagles, condors and Magellanic woodpeckers.

=== Reserva Malalcahuello ===
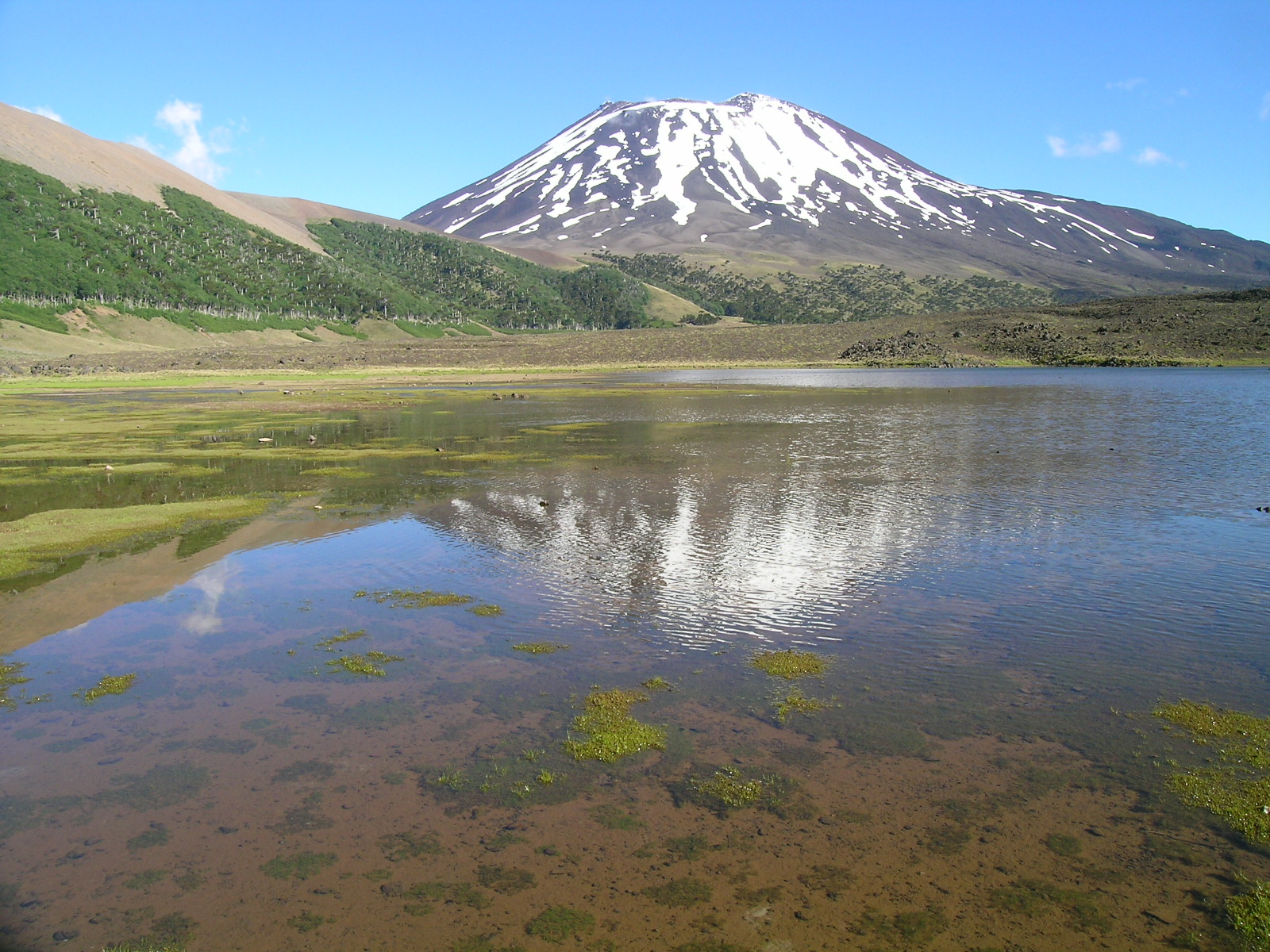
Lonquimay Volcano

The Malalcahuello National Reserve is found around 30 km east of the town of Curacautín, on the southern side of Lonquimay Volcano. The trail runs 18 km north west from the Conaf lodge in the Coloradito sector of the park to the Malalcahuello sector lodge. Hikers can view the region's abundant tree life including the emblematic araucaria and examples of Lenga beeches, coihues and Antarctic beeches.

== Selva Valdiviana ==
Chile's “Selva Valdiviana” (Valdivian temperate rainforest) covers the Andes south of the central Mediterranean zone and north of Patagonia and its Magellanic subpolar forests, centering on the Los Lagos and Los Ríos regions. The area includes several well-known lakes and volcanoes such as: Llanquihue Lake, Osorno Volcano, Todos los Santos Lake and Calbuco Volcano.

The two Sendero de Chile hikes in this area are:

=== Santa Elvira – Las Parras ===
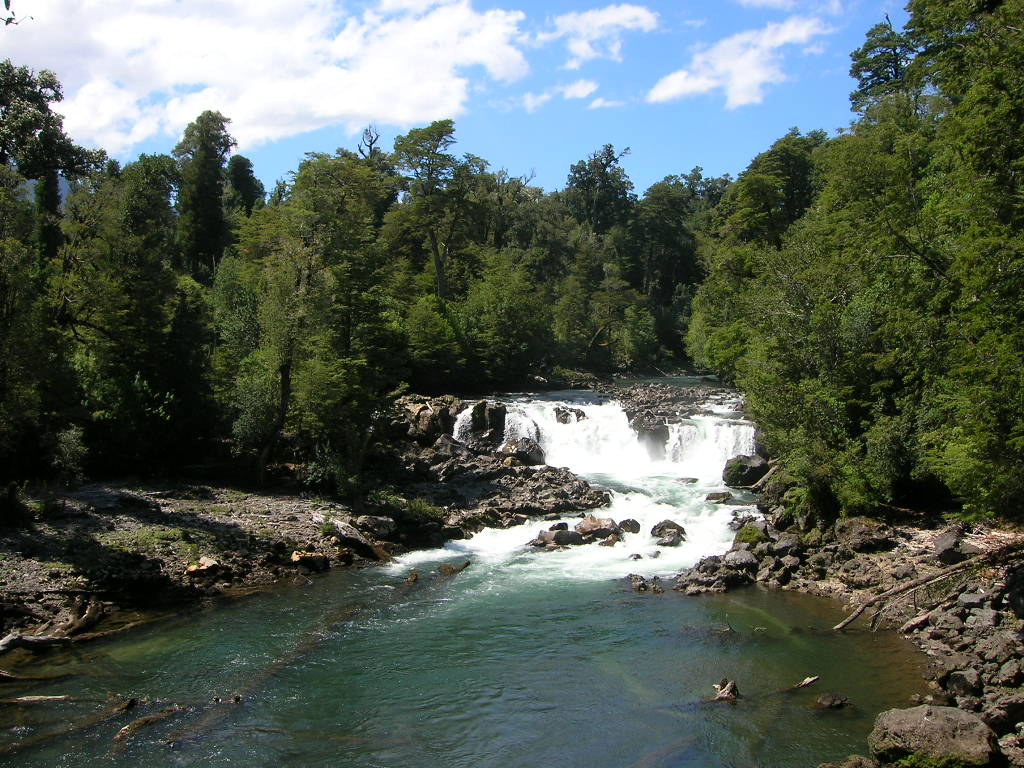
Waterfall in Puyehue National Park

This trail lies on the south-western edge of Puyehue National Park in Los Lagos Region. It runs between two small lakes, Toro Lake and Paraiso Lake, and on to the 1,500 meter Cerro Sarnoso mountain. It is possible to view wildlife including pudús, kodkods and long-nosed caenolestids, as well as the native Valdivian rainforest.

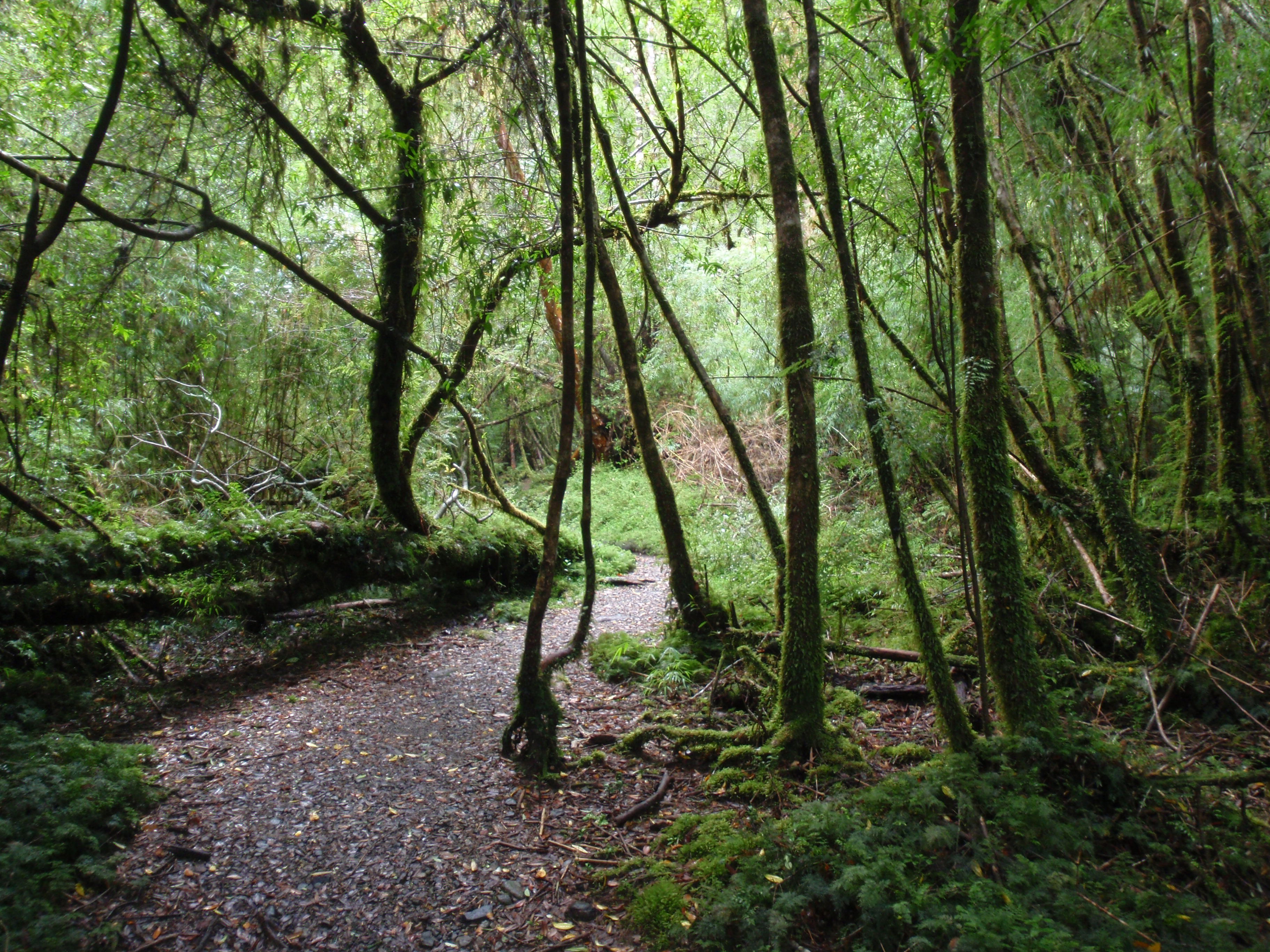
Alerce Andino National Park

=== Parque Nacional Alerce Andino ===
The Alerce Andino National Park is found in the southern part of the Selva Valdiviana zone, bounded by the Reloncaví Estuary on its east and south sides and the Reloncaví Sound to the west. This short trail begins at the Salto Río Chamiza waterfall near the park's administration center and winds 5 km south via Laguna Sargazo lagoon and the “Cathedral of Millennial Alerces”, a stand of the ancient Fitzroya or ‘’alerce’’ trees after which the park is named.

== Patagonia Aysén ==
The Patagonia Aysén zone covers the Aysén Region in northern Chilean Patagonia, which includes the town of Coyhaique, its capital, and the Carretera Austral highway, which provides the only road access to the area.

The Sendero de Chile currently lists one trail in this zone: Reserva Cerro Castillo.

=== Reserva Cerro Castillo ===
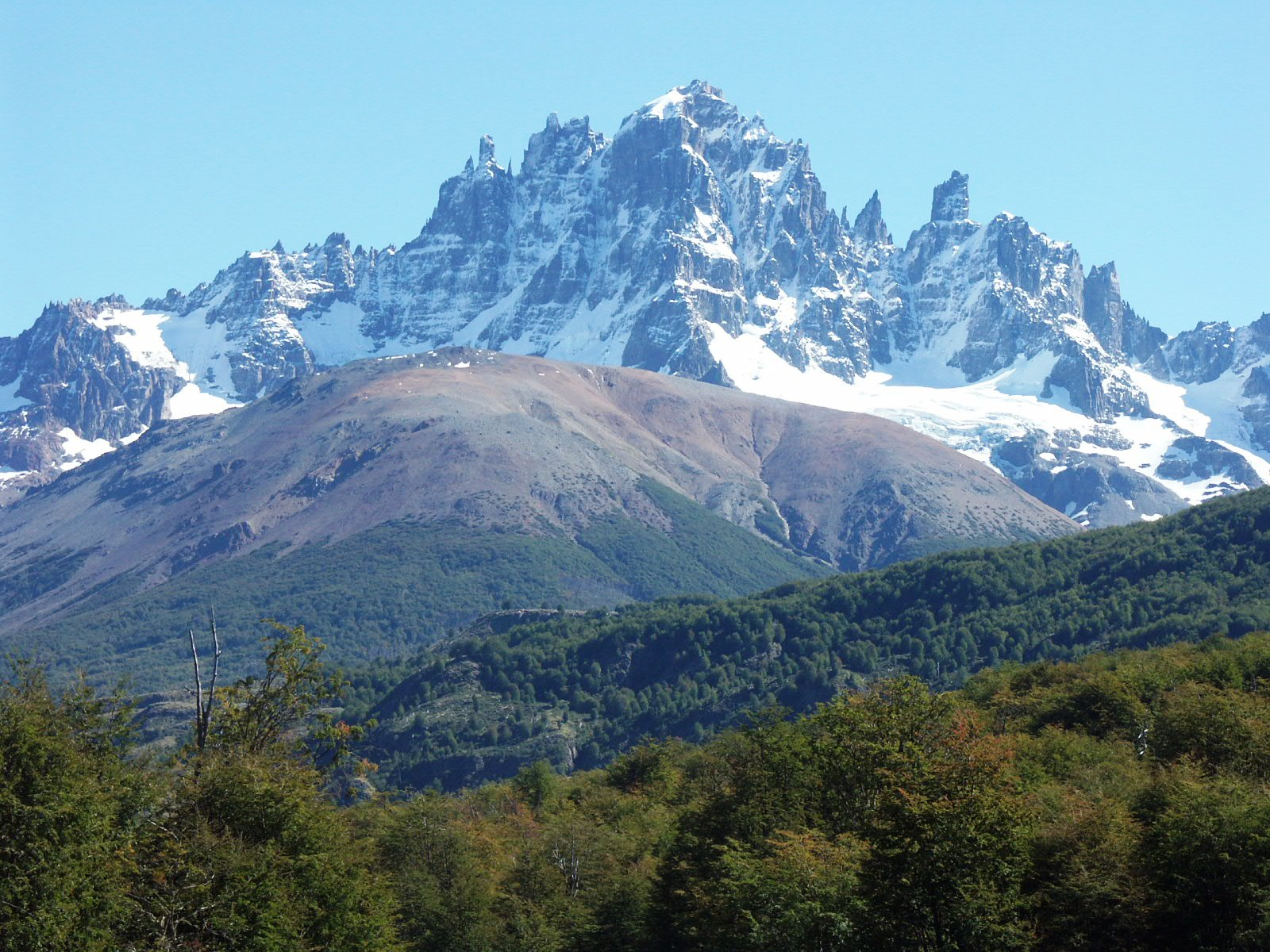
Cerro Castillo, Aysén

Lying to the south of Coyhaique and on the route of the Carretera Austral, the Cerro Castillo National Reserve is named after Cerro Castillo, its highest mountain at 2,675 meters. The trail begins in the park’s Lago Monreal sector and runs 50 km to Villa Cerro Castillo. Points of interest include the Alero Las Manos de Cerro Castillo National Monument, a cave near Cerro Castillo where it is possible to view prehistoric hand print paintings dating back approximately 6,000 years. In November, rodeo tournaments also take place in the Villa Frei and Villa Cerro Castillo sectors of the park.

== Última Esperanza ==
Última Esperanza Province is one of four provinces in the southern Chilean region of Magallanes and Antártica Chilena and is named after Última Esperanza Sound (“Last Hope Sound”). The province contains some of Chile's most notable natural features including Torres del Paine National Park, Cerro Torre, Cerro Chaltén, the Southern Patagonian Ice Field and the Cueva del Milodón Natural Monument.

There is currently one Sendero de Chile trail in this area, in Torres del Paine National Park.

=== Parque Nacional Torres del Paine ===
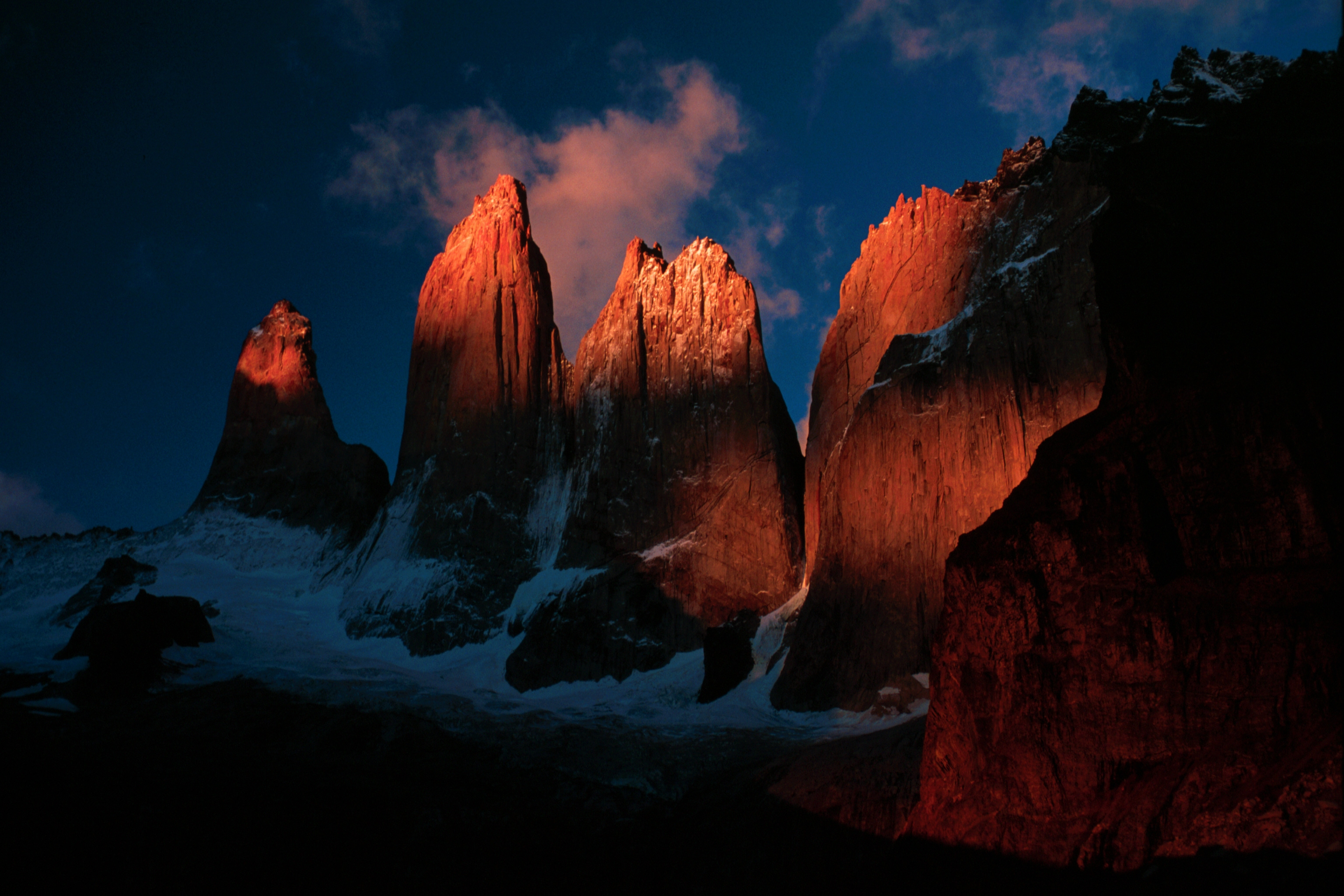
The Torres del Paine at sunrise

Torres del Paine National Park, called “the jewel of Patagonia” by Andrew Gilchrist in The Guardian newspaper, is one of the largest and most important parks in Chile and the third most visited, with more than 150,000 visitors in the 12-month period from March 2012 to February 2013. It is also a UNESCO World Biosphere Reserve.

The Sendero de Chile trail runs 18 km from the Serrano Conaf lodge up along the western side of Lake Pehoé, via Las Carretas campsite and Mirador Pehoe lookout, ending at the Pehoe Conaf lodge, and offers views of the Cordillera del Paine, Grey Glacier and Lake Pehoé.

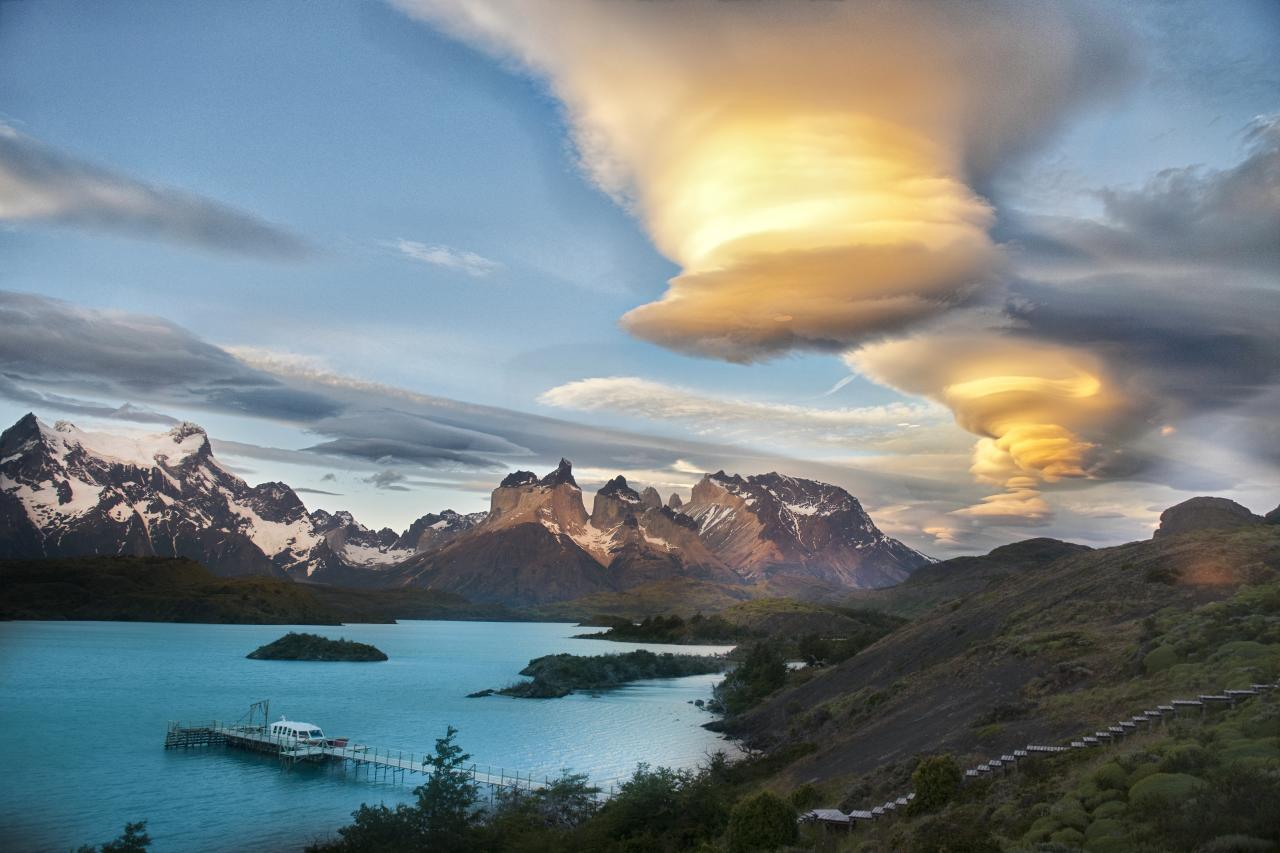
The Cordillera del Paine and Lake Pehoé

There are several other well-known hiking trails within Torres del Paine National Park, including the “W”, which leads in and out of the valleys on the south side of the Paine massif, and the “Full Circuit”, which continues on around the less-visited north side of the massif.

See also

Tourism in Chile, Regions of Chile, Geography of Chile

== Unofficial trail network ==
A large network of horse trails exists and provides access to remote areas in the Andes. These horse trails were often created by local herdsmen and settlers to drive livestock to summer pastures in the Andes and to reach remote outposts. Many of these trails are not documented in maps, lack signposts but are in principle suitable and attractive for hiking.

Individual initiatives now document such trails by GPS and publish them by internet on free-access, free content, trekking wikis and forums.

=== Greater Patagonian Trail ===
An informal long-distance route in Chile and Argentina was created by individual initiative in 2014. The 3,000 km (1,850 mi) Greater Patagonian Trail crosses five of the nine trekking zones (Central Andes, Alto Bío Bío, Andean Araucanía, Valdivian Forest, Patagonia Aysén) on a continuous route. Because the trail traverses remote areas of the Andes, lacks signposts and the infrastructure is limited, this is a challenging long-distance path. The trail is characterized by a great diversity and incorporates optional rafting routes.

== See also ==
- Backpacking
