= Laja =

Laja may refer to:

Bolivia

- Laja Municipality, a subdivision of La Paz Department
- Laja, Bolivia, a town in the municipality

Chile

- Laja, Chile, a town in Bío-Bío Province
- Laja Lake
- Laja Falls
- Isla del Laja

Panama

- La Laja, a corregimiento in Las Tablas District, Los Santos Province, Panama

Syria

- Lajat, also spelled Laja, a geographic region

== See also ==
- Laja River (disambiguation)
