= Laguna del Laja National Park =

- IUCN category II (national park)
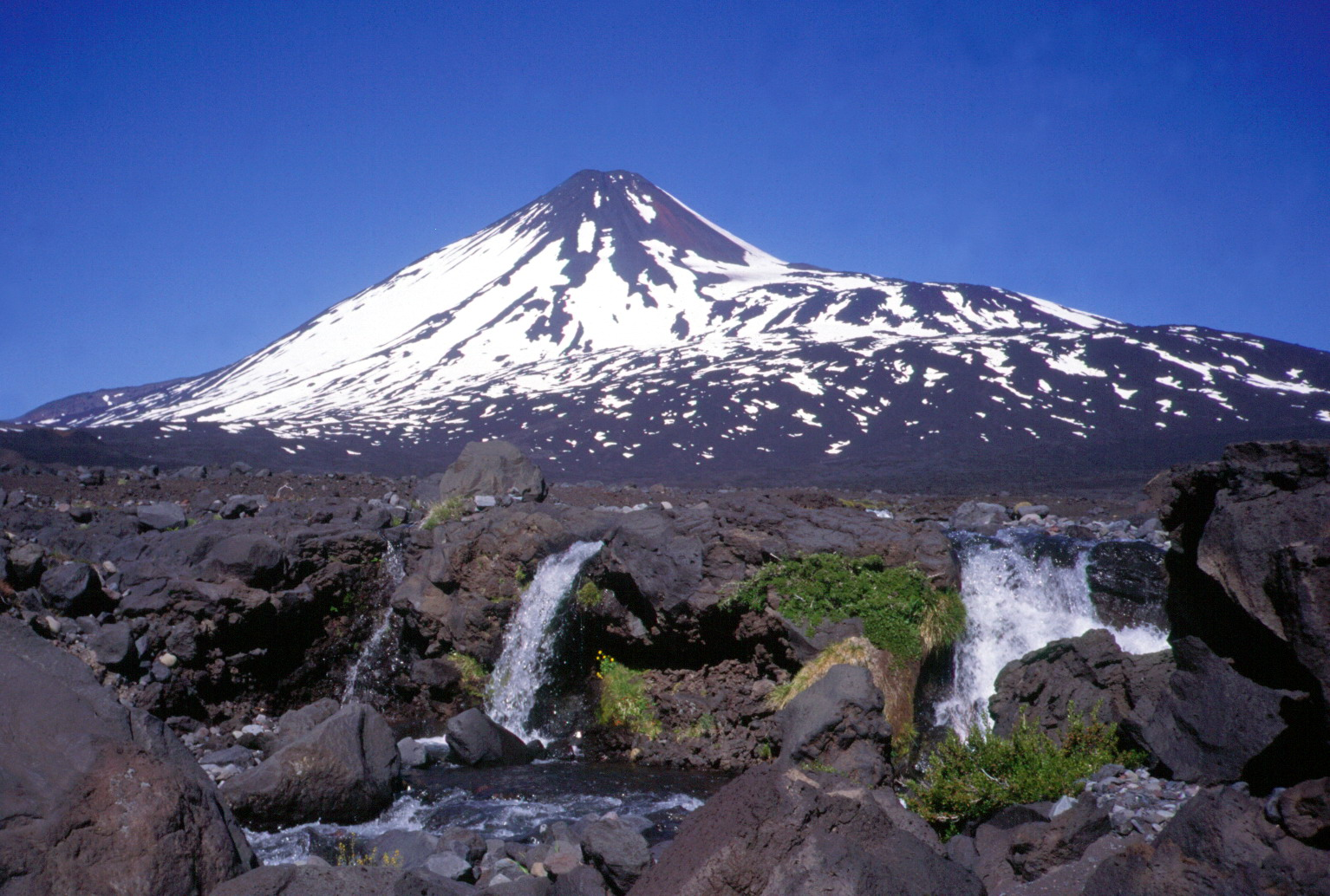
- Antuco volcano
- Interactive map of Laguna del Laja National Park
- Location: Bío Bío Region, Chile
- Nearest city: Los Ángeles
- Coordinates: 37°25′00″S 71°21′00″W
- Area: 119 km^{2} (46 sq mi)
- Established: 1958
- Visitors: 48,837 (in 2012)
- Governing body: Corporación Nacional Forestal

Laguna del Laja National Park (Spanish pronunciation: [laˈɣuna ðel ˈlaxa]) is a national park of Chile located in the Andes, between 37°22’ and 37°28’ south latitude and 71°16’ and 71°26’ west longitude.

== Geography ==
The park features spectacular mountain landscapes, whose main attractions are the Antuco Volcano, Sierra Velluda and Laguna del Laja (Laja Lake). The latter gives the name to this protected area, but it only borders the park. The park ranges in elevation from 976 m to 3585 m at Sierra Velluda. Although a little snow caps Antuco volcano, much more snow adorns the two major summits of its southern neighbor, even during Chile’s summer. Sharp ridges and deep valleys carve this rugged region, which alternates between bare rock and lush vegetation. Another summit in the park, although least prominent, is Cerro Cóndor at 1,668 m.

The park forms part of the Bío Bío River basin. Some small tributaries of Laja River originate in the park.

== Biology ==
The park lies within the Valdivian temperate forests ecoregion.

It is home to a wide variety of wildlife, including the cougar and foxes (particularly the chilla and the culpeo). In the park have been identified 47 bird species.

Endangered and rare vegetation species are found in the park. Among them are: ciprés de la cordillera, araucaria, maitén del Chubut and radal enano.

== Tourism ==
Several activities can be performed within the boundaries of the park and in the surrounding area including climbing, trekking, skiing and fishing.

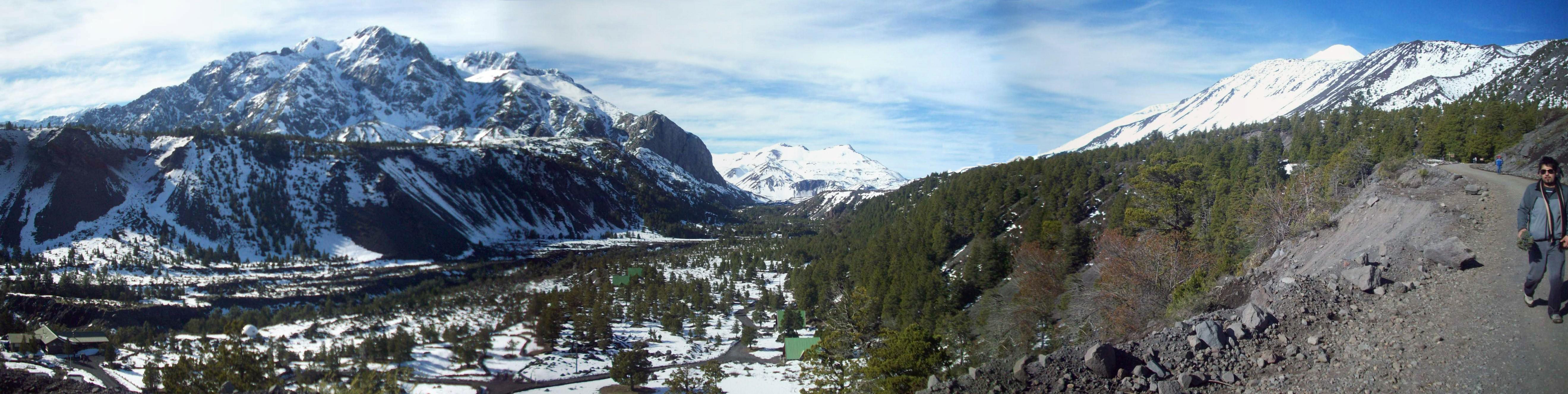
Panoramic of Laguna del Laja National Park, climbing the mountains. In the top right (white tip) shows the Antuco volcano.

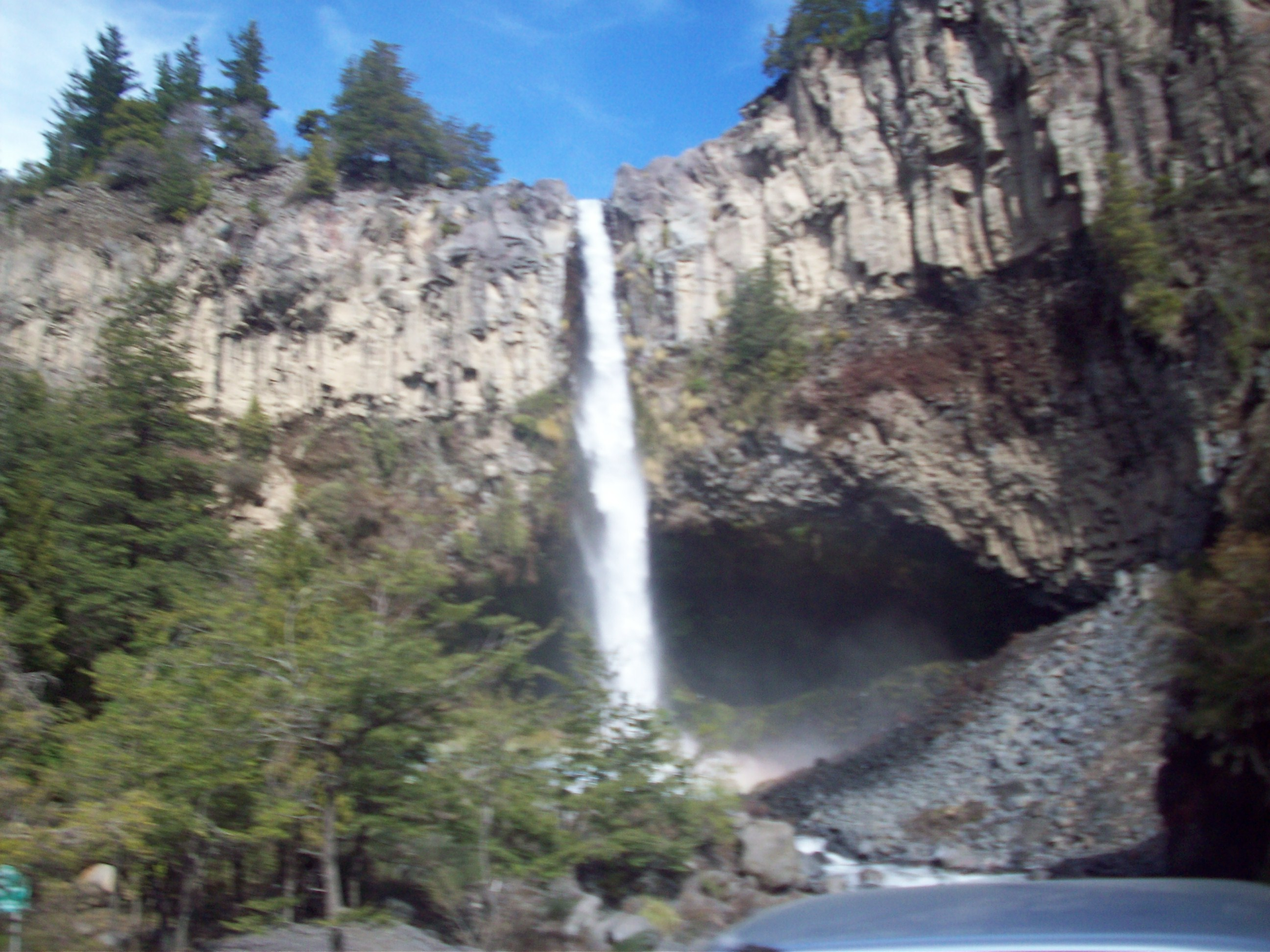
One of the park's waterfalls

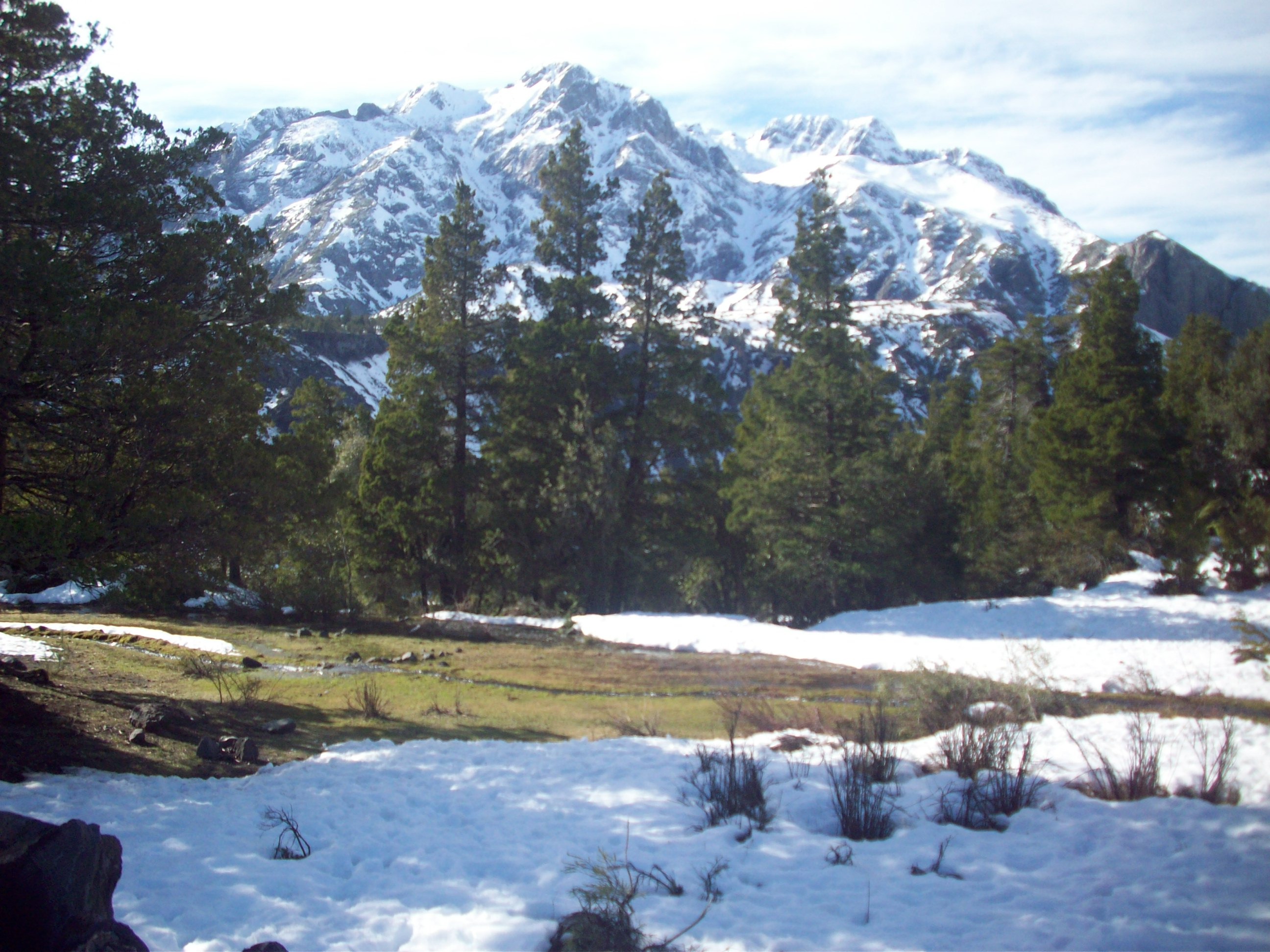
in the park

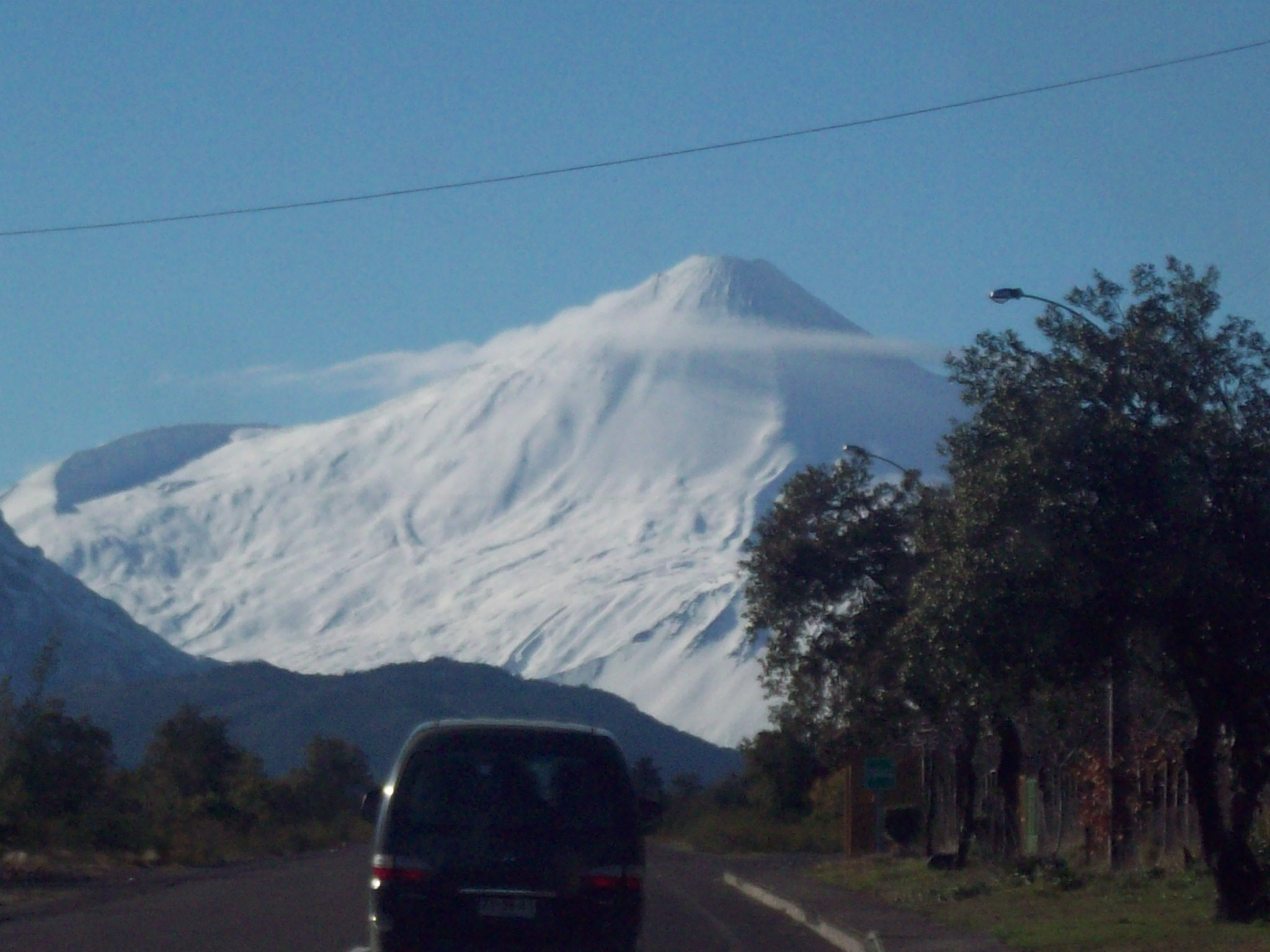
Antuco volcano

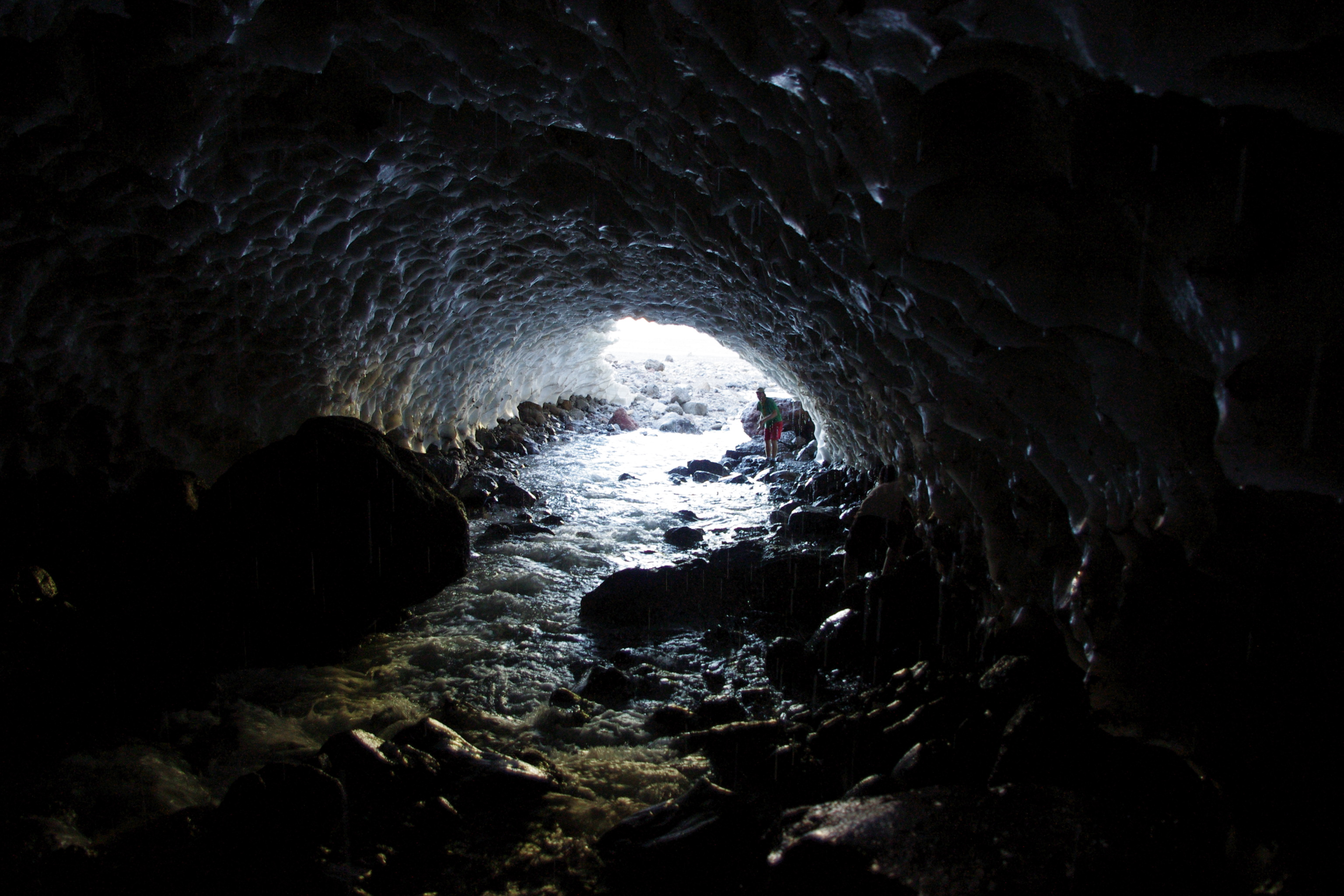
Ice caves formed at the foot of the Sierra Velluda in summer.
