= Laja River =

Laja River (Río De La Laja in Spanish) may refer to:

- Laja River (Mexico), Guanajuato, central Mexico
- Laja River (Chile)

== See also ==
- Lajas River
- Laja (disambiguation)
