= Antuco incident =

2005 Chilean Army accident

Coordinates: 37.376978°S 71.335344°W

On May 18, 2005, Major Patricio Cereceda of the Chilean Army ordered 474 conscripts from the 17th Regiment of Los Ángeles to march 28 km along the side of the Antuco Volcano at altitudes between 1,400 metres (4,600 ft) and 1,700 metres (5,600 ft). The march took place despite warnings from sergeants and corporals who requested the exercise be canceled due to deteriorating weather conditions. Major Cereceda remained at a military mountain shelter during the march.

Of the five companies sent on the march, only one was equipped with mountain survival gear. Many of the conscripts, mostly teenagers, had been in service for less than three months. Five hours into the march, a severe storm hit, resulting in a viento blanco (whiteout) that disoriented the troops. While many conscripts managed to find shelter or hike to safety, 44 conscripts and one sergeant succumbed to hypothermia or exposure.

== Consequences ==
=== Political response ===
The Antuco incident was the Chilean military's worst peacetime disaster since the Alpatacal tragedy of 1927, where 12 cadets died in Argentina during a visit for the country's independence day celebrations. The Antuco incident sparked calls for the abolition of compulsory military service in Chile.

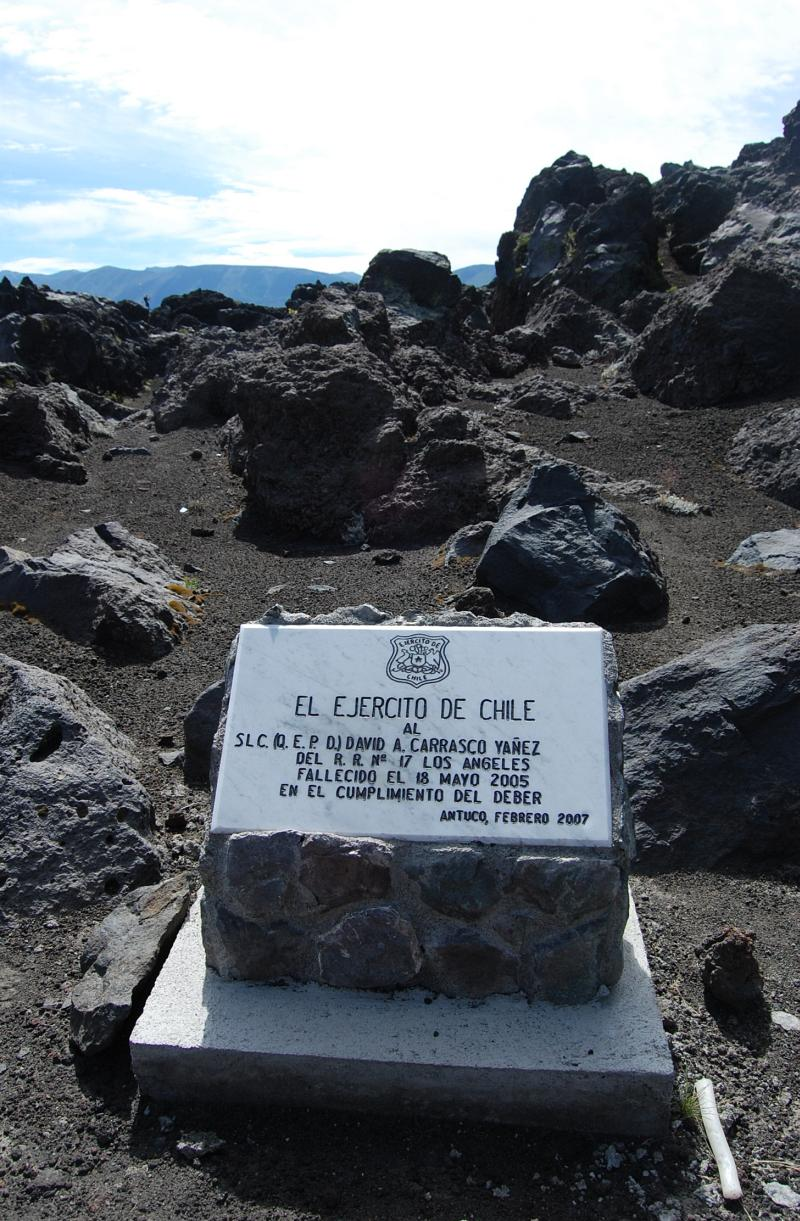
Memorial plaque honoring the victims of the incident.

=== Military sanctions ===
The military investigation into the incident led to the sanctioning of nine officers for their role in the ill-fated training, which was described as an exercise that "never should have been carried out." Three senior officers—Major Patricio Cereceda, Lieutenant Colonel Luis Pineda, and Colonel Roberto Mercado—were forced to retire. Additionally, six junior officers received jail sentences ranging from two to ten days and were reprimanded. Ten soldiers were commended for their efforts during the incident.

General Rodolfo González, Commander of Chile's Division III, resigned as a matter of honor, assuming responsibility for the actions of his subordinates.

=== Judicial proceedings ===
Six individuals faced civilian inquiries related to the incident. Major Patricio Cereceda was the only officer sentenced, receiving five years in Punta Peuco Prison. He was granted parole on November 3, 2011, after serving three years and nine months of his sentence.

=== Compensation ===
The Chilean Army announced a compensation package for the families of the victims, which included life insurance payments of US$5,400, reparations of US$4,900, and a monthly pension of approximately US$260 for surviving dependents. The Supreme Court of Chile later awarded US$560,000 in indemnities to the 27 survivors, equating to approximately US$20,600 for each individual.

== See also ==
- The sinking of the Cazador, the largest death toll in Chilean military history in peacetime
- Hakkōda Mountains disaster
- List of mountaineering disasters by death toll
