= El Toro Hydroelectric Plant =

Coordinates: 37.2728°S 71.4593°W

El Toro Hydroelectric Plant is a hydroelectric power station in Bío Bío Region, Chile. The plant uses water from Laja River and produces 400 megawatts (540,000 hp) of electricity. The plant was built by ENDESA in 1973 (52 years ago).
