= Laja Falls =

Waterfall in Chile

Coordinates: 37°12′56″S 72°23′00″W

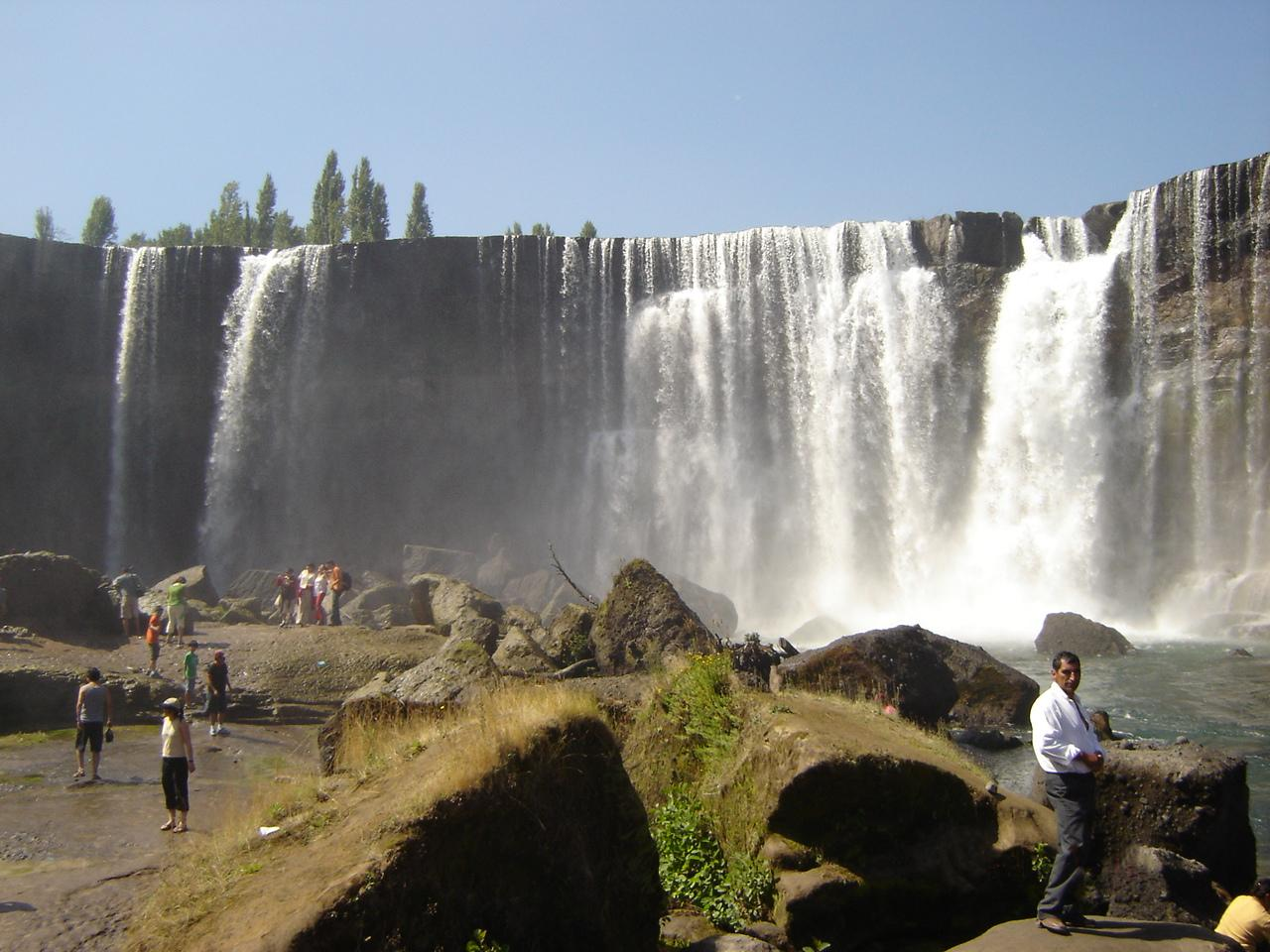
Laja Falls

Laja Falls (Spanish: Salto del Laja) is a waterfall located in the Laja River in southcentral Chile. It lies next to the old Pan-American Highway, between the cities of Los Ángeles and Chillán. Below the falls, the river has formed a narrow canyon. The falls consist of four horseshoe-shaped falls, one on each arm of Laja River. The tallest (35 m) is the easternmost fall, while the western falls are 20 m tall.

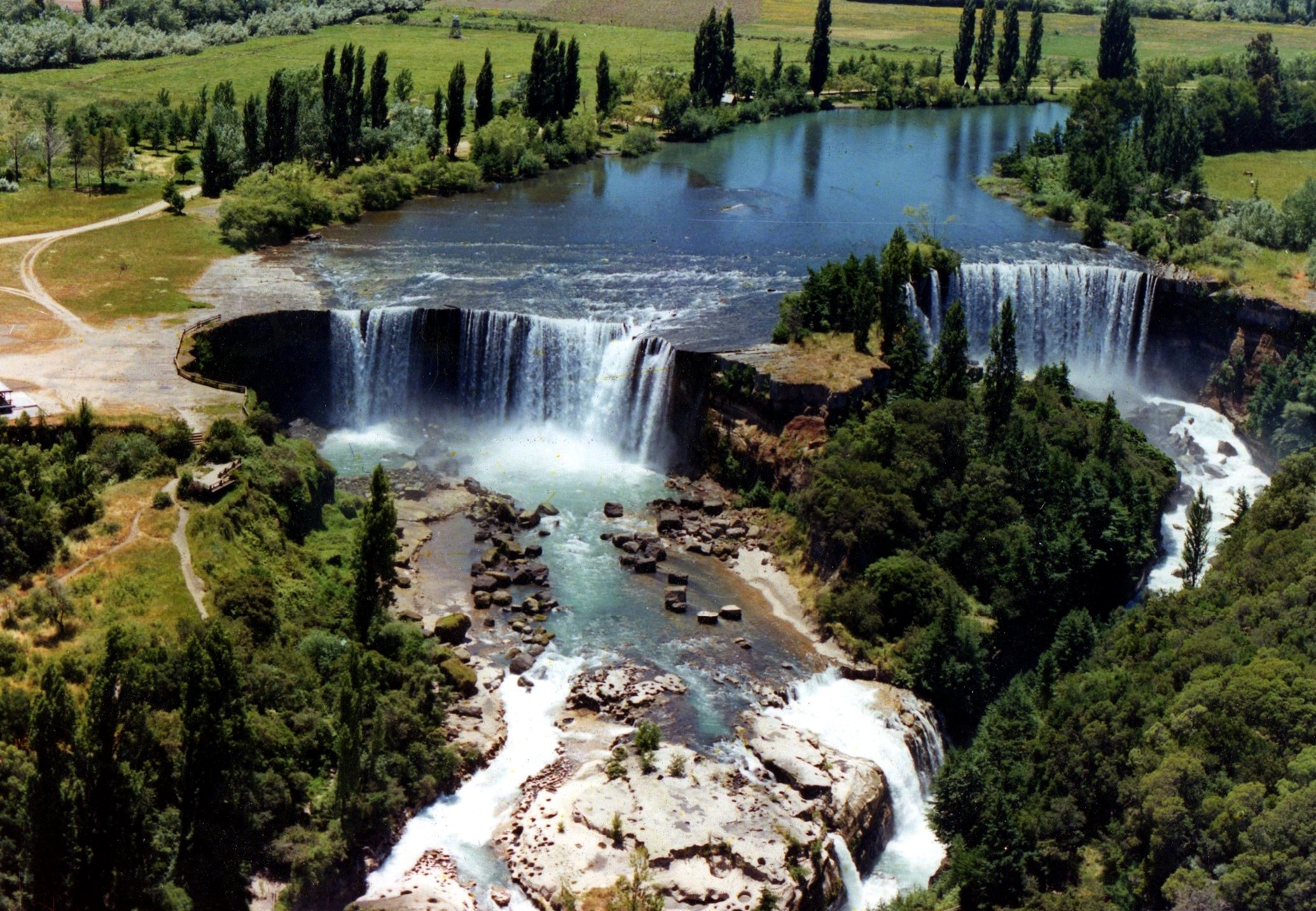
Two eastern falls from above

== See also ==
- List of waterfalls
