= Antuco Hydroelectric Plant =

Hydroelectric power plant in Chile

Coordinates: 37.3100°S 71.6267°W

Antuco Hydroelectric Plant is a hydroelectric power station in Bío Bío Region, Chile. The plant uses water from Laja River and produces 300 megawatts (400,000 hp) of electricity. The plant was built by ENDESA in 1981 (44 years ago).
