= Sierra Velluda =

Mountain in Chile

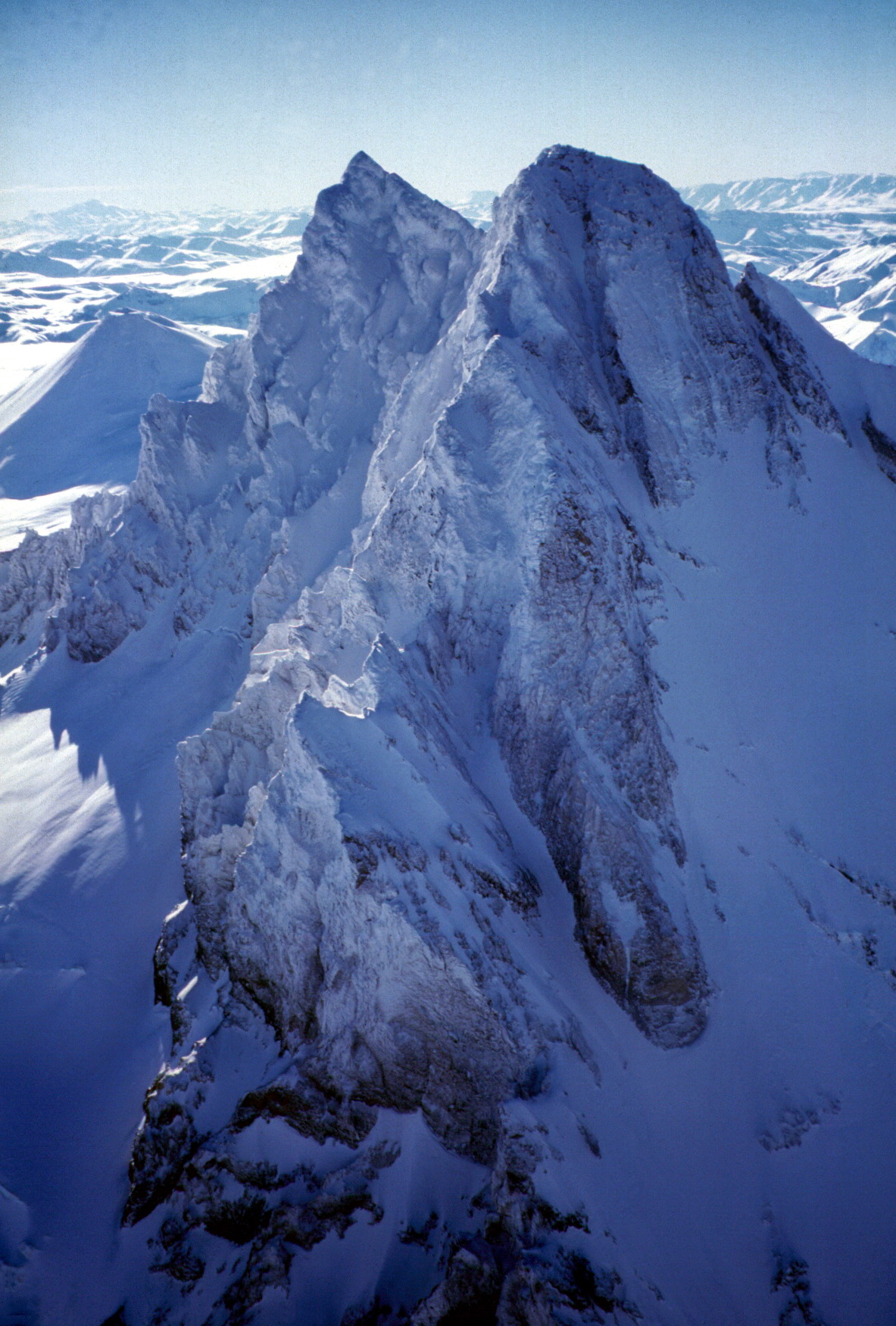
- South-southwest face of Sierra Velluda. Antuco Volcano and Domuyo are visible in the upper-left portion of the image.

Highest point
- Elevation: 3,585 m (11,762 ft)
- Prominence: 1,784 m (5,853 ft)
- Listing: Ultra
- Coordinates: 37°27′48″S 71°24′57″W

Geography
- Location within Chile
- Location: Chile
- Parent range: Andes

Sierra Velluda is a massive Pleistocene stratovolcano located immediately southwest of the Antuco Volcano, in the Bío Bío Region of Chile. The heavily glaciated mountain has two main summits and is the tallest mountain in Laguna del Laja National Park.

Sierra Velluda was formed in two stages. The first stage occurred 495,000 years ago and is formed by about 1.5 kilometres (0.93 mi) of breccia and lava flows, with sporadic pyroclastic flows. The second is dated to 381,000 years ago and is made out of 3 kilometres (1.9 mi) breccia and lava. Subsequently, glacial erosion exposed the older layers.

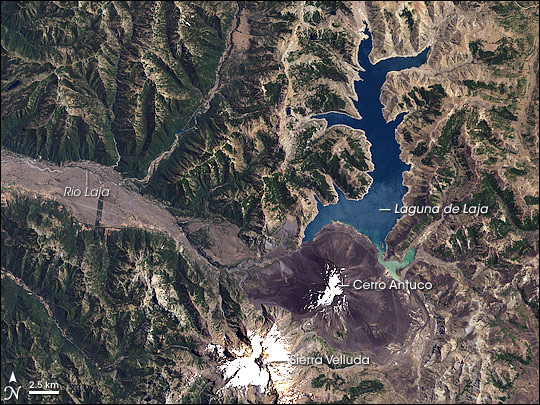
The ice-capped Sierra Velluda is visible in the lower part of this image.

== See also ==
- List of Ultras of South America
