= Tragedy of Alpatacal =

1927 military train crash in Argentina

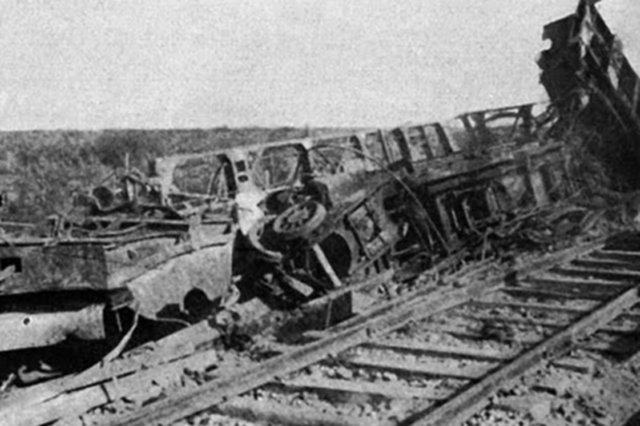
Aftermath of the accident

The tragedy of Alpatacal occurred on 7 July 1927 in Mendoza Province, Argentina, when a train full of passengers, mostly cadets from the Military School of Chile, crashed with another one waiting at the small train station of Alpatacal (the event was referred to afterward as the "Cadets of Chile").

== Details ==
Thirty people were killed and more than 30 were injured. The accident was one of the biggest tragedies in the military history of Chile during peacetime, with 12 Chilean military dead, and also causing the death of 16 Argentinian train workers. The Chilean military were on their way to Buenos Aires to participate in celebrations of the Independence of Argentina and the birthday of President Bartolomé Mitre.

Despite the situation, the survivors arrived in Buenos Aires and participated in the celebrations, due to the order of General Bartolomé Guillermo Blanche Espejo to comply with the invitation of the Argentinian government.

Many tributes were paid to the victims, both in Argentina and Chile. A street in Liniers neighborhood was named "Alpatacal" and in the military school of Santiago there is a memorial paying tribute to the dead cadets; it is a place used in ceremonies to give out honors to cadets for outstanding action in service. It is also a place to commemorate the relations between Argentina and Chile.

A sculpture in bronze by Argentine artist Alberto Lagos representing the union of Argentina and Chile was installed at the crash site. The sculpture was stolen in 2006.
