= Laja River (Chile) =

Coordinates: 37.2699°S 72.7243°W

Location
- Country: Chile

Physical characteristics
- Source
  - location: Laguna del Laja
- Mouth
  - location: Biobío River
- Length: 140 km (87 mi)
- Basin size: 4,040 km^{2} (1,560 sq mi)

Laja River (Spanish: Río Laja) is a river in Chile, along which can be found the Laja Falls. It is located in the Bío Bío Region. The source of the river is Laguna del Laja in the Andes, then flows westward through the Chilean Central Valley and terminates into the Bío Bío River, being an important tributary of it.

== Whitewater ==
The Laja River is known among whitewater kayakers in Chile as Class 5 very steep and thrilling whitewater kayaking run. The Laja river actually forms from a drainage in the Lake Laja where the water exits at the bottom of the lake through the side of a mountain. Because the river is formed from exiting the bottom of the lake the river level is always constant.

== Hydropower ==
Three hydropower plants are located at and below the outlet of Lake Laja, including the 400 MW El Toro Hydroelectric Plant built in 1973 and the 300 MW Antuco Hydroelectric Plant built in 1981.

== Irrigation ==
Below the lake and the hydropower plants and before the Laja Falls lie 70,000 hectares of irrigated land.

== History ==
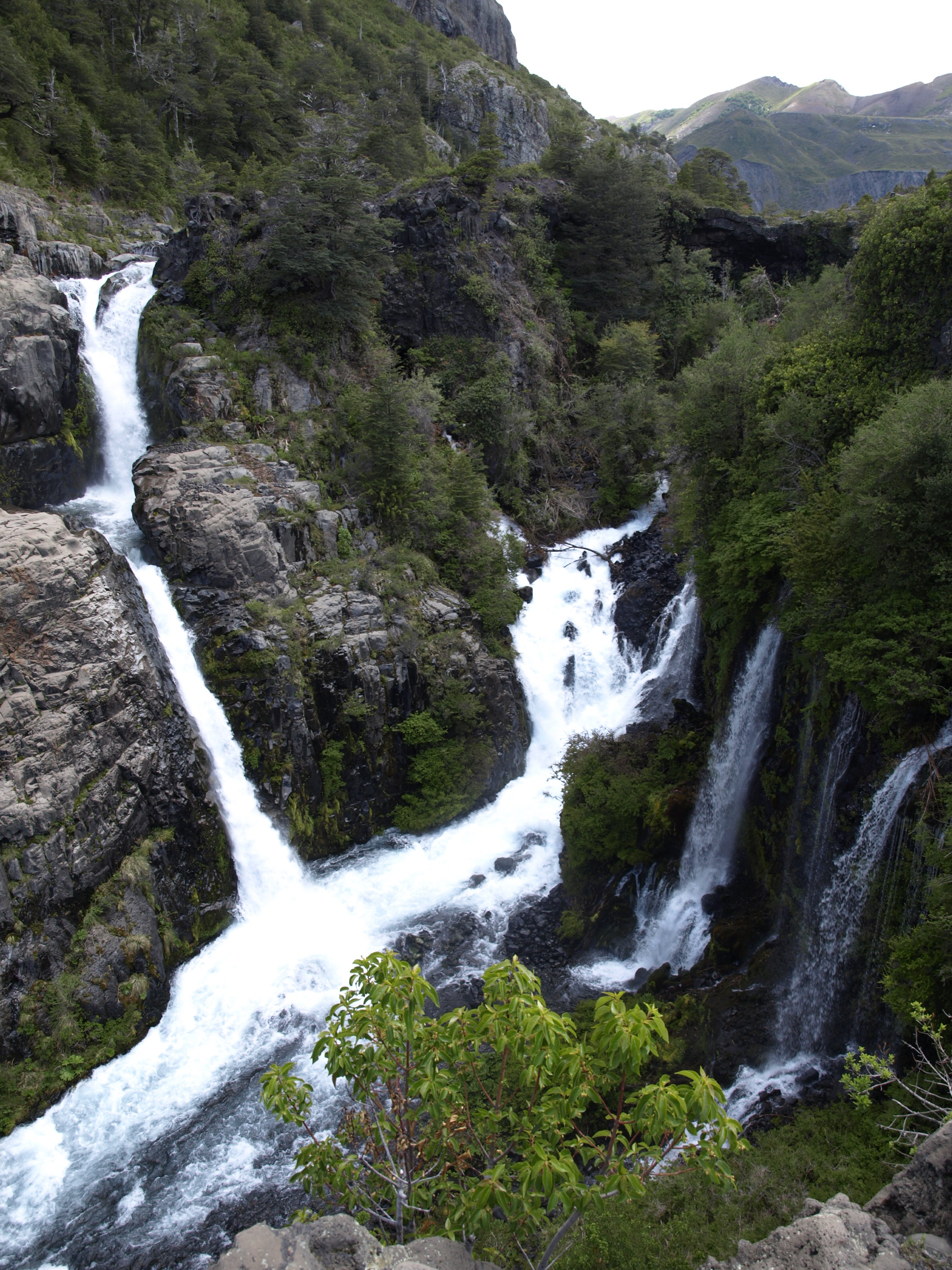
Las Chilcas Falls

In 1984, private companies planned to divert the Laja River to another river further north to power new hydroelectric plants there. Opponents argued that the interbasin transfer would dry up the Laja Falls and would increase pollution in the lower Biobío River, because the Laja River diluted the pollution from the upper BíoBío River and pollutant would be more concentrated in the absence of this dilution. Irrigators also feared their water rights would be affected. Although the Supreme Court rejected a lawsuit against the transfer, it was eventually considered to be too controversial politically and was abandoned.
