= Antuco (volcano) =

Mountain in Chile

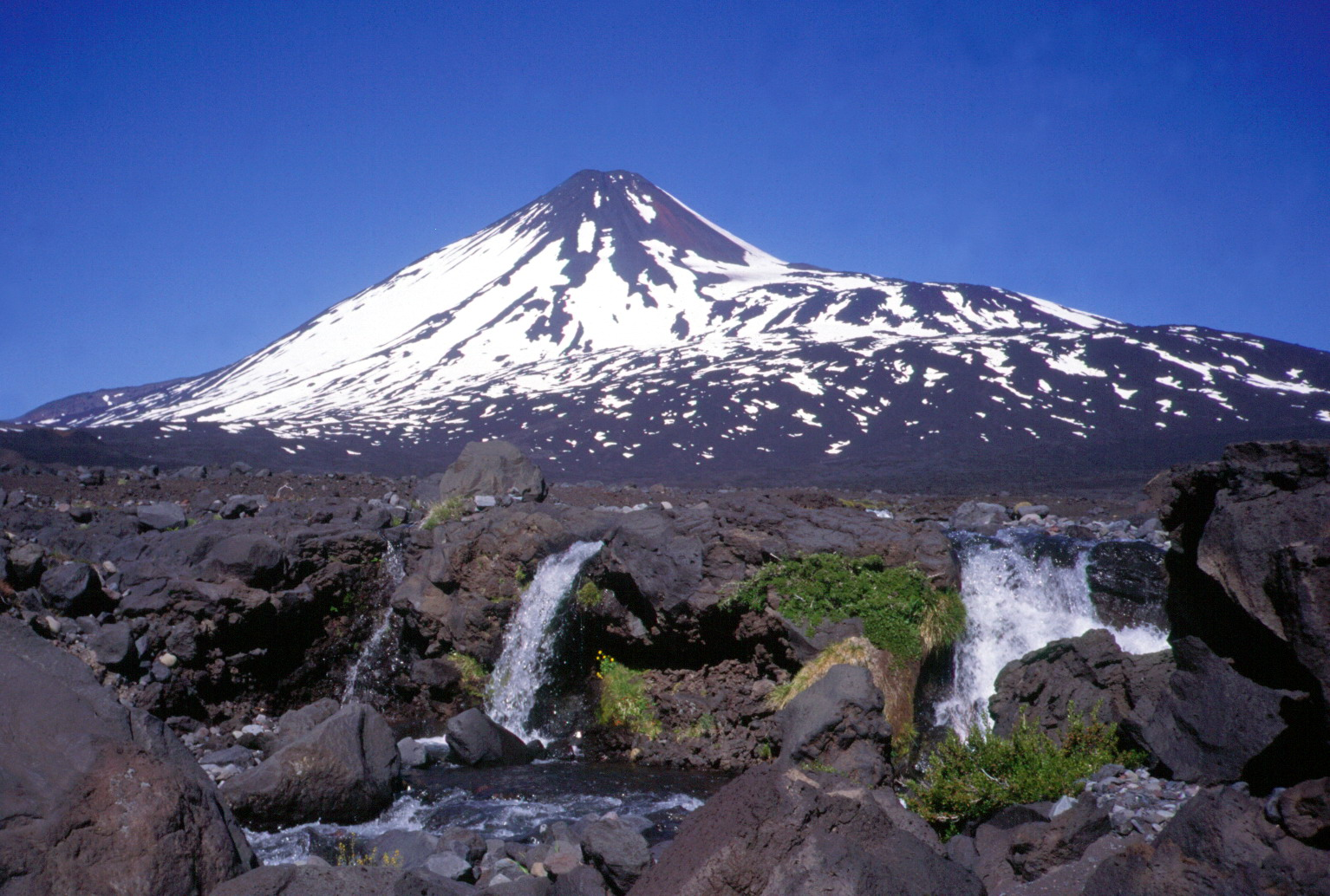

Highest point
- Elevation: 2,979 m (9,774 ft)
- Coordinates: 37°24′21″S 71°20′57″W

Geography
- Location within Chile
- Location: Chile
- Parent range: Andes

Geology
- Mountain type: Stratovolcano
- Volcanic zone: South Volcanic Zone
- Last eruption: 1869

Climbing
- First ascent: 1829 by Eduard Poeppig

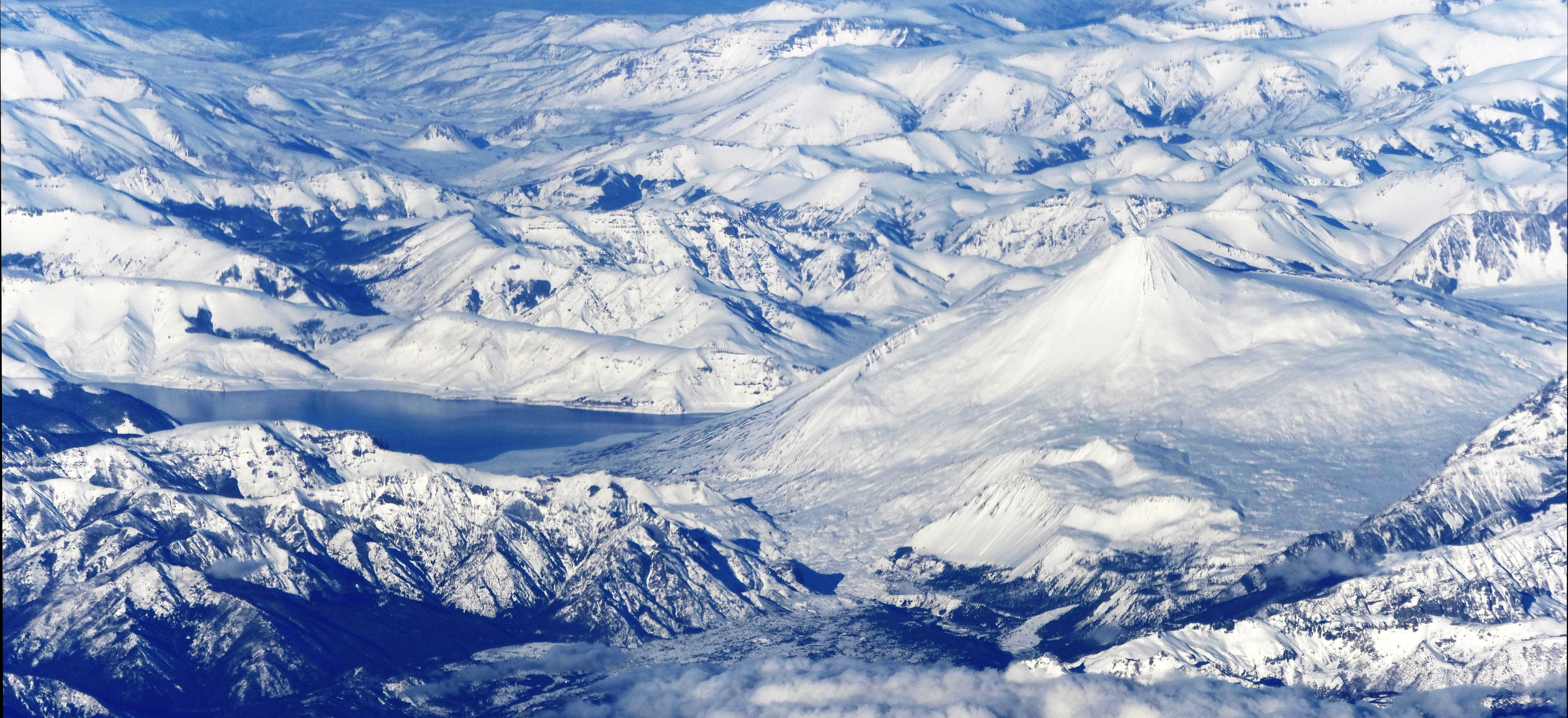
Antuco volcano and the Laja lake seen from west in winter

Antuco Volcano is a stratovolcano located in the Bío Bío Region of Chile, near Sierra Velluda and on the shore of Laguna del Laja.

== Eruptions ==
The first registered eruption occurred in 1624 but it is known that the volcano experienced some activity in the 16th century. The 1624 eruption was strombolian forming a lava flow and resulting in the ejection of pyroclasts. Beginning with this eruption many more were recorded as the volcano lies near an Andean mountain pass transited by the Spanish.

=== 24–30 April 2013 ===
In April 2013, there were reported signs of activity sighted by nearby inhabitants - a pilot even reported ash spewing from the volcano. The Volcanic Ash Advisory Center in Buenos Aires, Argentina, investigated and determined that only trace gases and steam had emerged from Antuco.

== In literature ==
- The Voyage of the Beagle by Charles Darwin
- Les Enfants du capitaine Grant, also known as In Search of Castaways: A Romantic Narrative of the Loss of Captain Grant of the Brig Britannia and of the Adventures of His Children and Friends in His Discovery and Rescue, by Jules Verne

== See also ==
- Tragedy of Antuco
