= Laja Lake =

Lake in Chile

Laguna del Laja
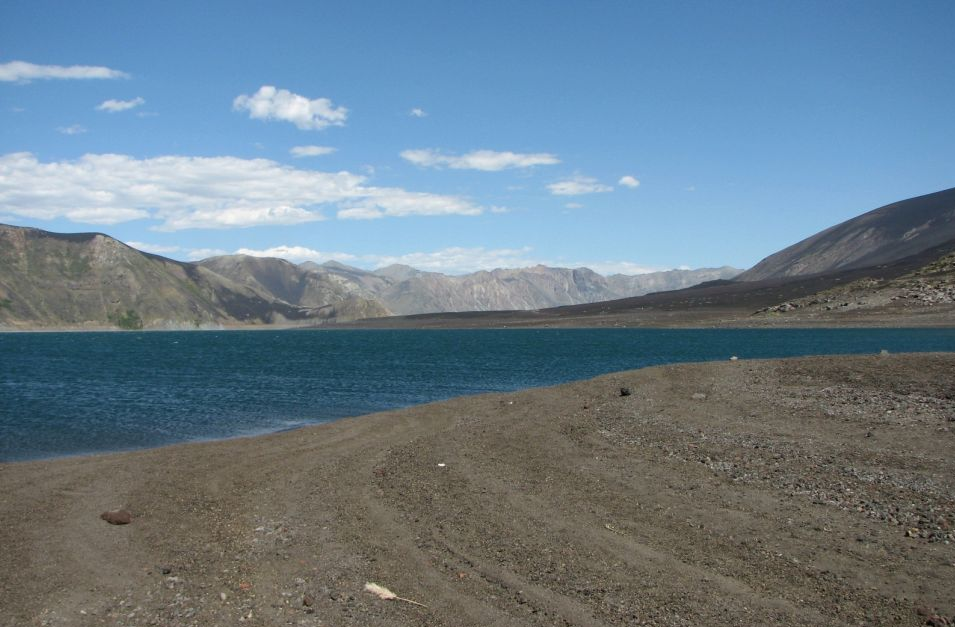

- Location within Chile
- Coordinates: 37°19′S 71°18′W
- Primary outflows: Laja River
- Basin countries: Chile
- Max. length: 32.5 km (20.2 mi)
- Max. width: 10 km (6.2 mi)
- Surface area: 128.1 km^{2} (49.5 sq mi)
- Average depth: ~ 54 m (177 ft)
- Max. depth: ~ 135 m (443 ft)
- Water volume: ~ 6.92 km^{3} (1.66 cu mi)
- Surface elevation: 1,360 m (4,460 ft)

Laguna del Laja is a lake located in the Bío-Bío Region of Chile. The lake borders and gives its name to Laguna del Laja National Park.
