= Hugo Rey =

Chilean politician

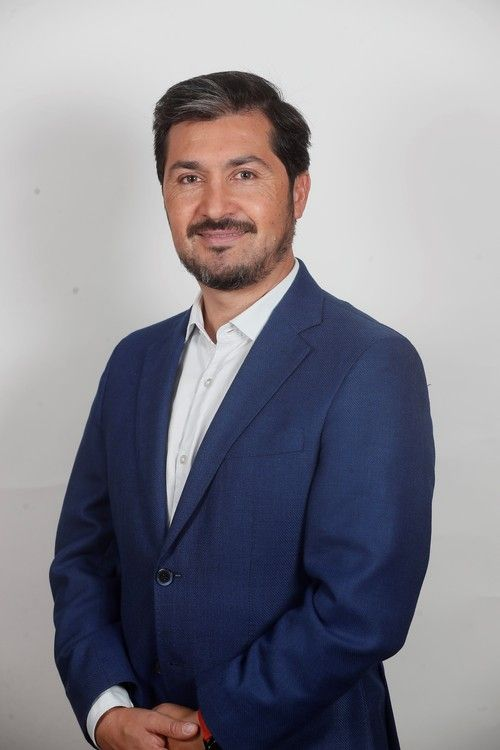

Member of the Chamber of Deputies
- In office 11 March 2018 – 11 March 2026
- Preceded by: District created
- Constituency: District 17

Mayor of Curicó
- In office 6 December 2008 – 6 December 2012
- Preceded by: Celso Morales
- Succeeded by: Javier Riquelme

Personal details
- Born: 6 December 1973 (age 52) Curicó, Chile
- Party: Independent Democratic Union; Renovación Nacional
- Spouse: Lorena Zenteno
- Children: Three
- Occupation: Politician

Hugo Vicente Rey Martínez (born 6 December 1973) is a Chilean politician.

== Family and early life ==
He was born in Curicó, in the Maule Region, on 6 December 1973, the son of Hugo Rey Acosta and Guillermina Martínez Silva.

He is married to Lorena Zenteno Gajardo and is the father of three daughters: Paola, Josefine, and Pascale.

== Professional life ==
He completed his secondary education at Luis Cruz Martínez High School in Curicó, graduating in 1991. He holds a degree as a teacher of primary education from the University of Playa Ancha and also undertook studies in architecture.

He worked as a schoolteacher between 1999 and 2008.

== Political career ==
He was initially a member of the Independent Democratic Union (UDI) before later joining National Renewal.

In the municipal elections held in October 2000, he was elected as a municipal councillor of Curicó. He was re-elected for a second term in 2004, obtaining 14.23% of the vote.

In the 2008 municipal elections, he was elected mayor of Curicó, representing the Independent Democratic Union, receiving 24,464 votes, equivalent to 44.14% of the valid votes cast. He sought re-election in October 2012 but was not elected, obtaining 16,859 votes (33.65%).

In December 2012, he was appointed Provincial Director of Education for the Province of Talca, a position he assumed in January 2013 and held until early 2014.

In November 2013, he ran for election as a regional councillor for the Province of Curicó and was elected after obtaining 14,792 votes, equivalent to 12.19% of the valid votes cast.

In the parliamentary elections of 2017, he was elected deputy for the 17th electoral district of the Maule Region—comprising the communes of Constitución, Curepto, Curicó, Empedrado, Hualañé, Licantén, Maule, Molina, Pelarco, Pencahue, Rauco, Río Claro, Romeral, Sagrada Familia, San Clemente, San Rafael, Talca, Teno, and Vichuquén—representing National Renewal within the Chile Vamos coalition. He obtained 20,517 votes, equivalent to 8.40% of the valid votes cast.

In August 2021, he sought re-election in the same district and was elected in the November parliamentary elections representing National Renewal within the Chile Podemos Más coalition, obtaining 17,736 votes, equivalent to 7.34% of the valid votes cast.

He was a candidate for the Senate of Chile for the 9th senatorial constituency of the Maule Region in the parliamentary elections held on 16 November 2025, representing National Renewal within the Chile Grande y Unido pact. He was not elected, obtaining 31,117 votes, equivalent to 4.46% of the total votes cast.
