= Catalina Parot =

Chilean lawyer, entrepreneur and politician

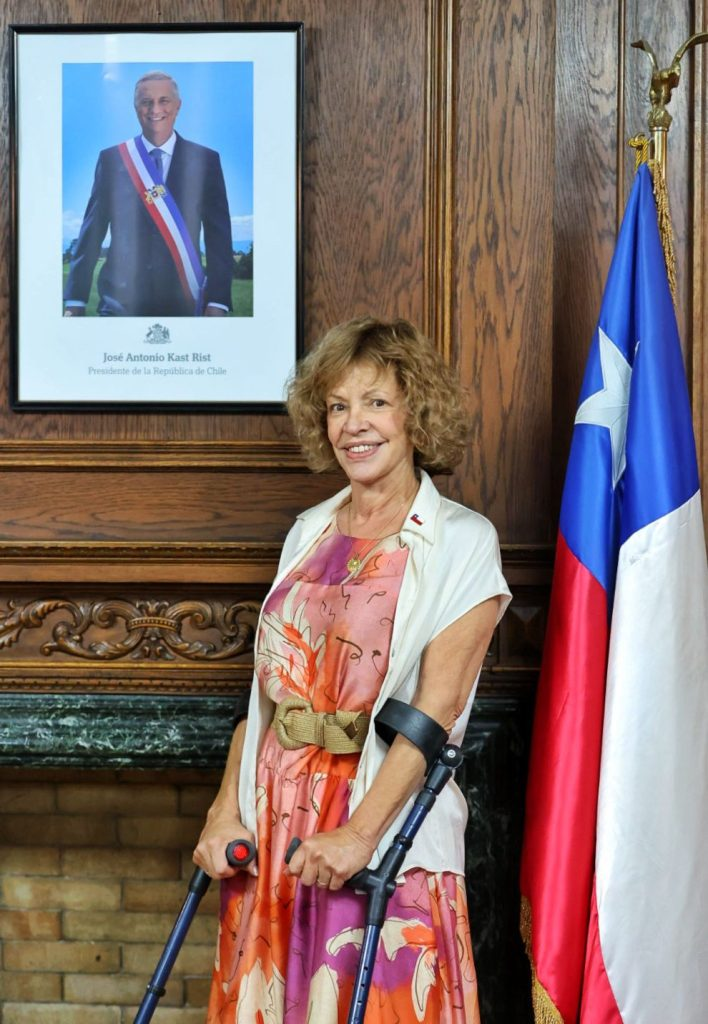
- Official portrait, 2026

Minister of National Assets
- Incumbent
- Assumed office 11 March 2026
- President: José Antonio Kast
- Preceded by: Francisco Figueroa
- In office 11 March 2010 – 5 November 2012
- President: Sebastián Pinera
- Preceded by: Jacqueline Weinstein
- Succeeded by: Rodrigo Pérez Mackenna

President of the National Television Council
- In office 12 April 2018 – 14 January 2021
- Preceded by: Óscar Reyes
- Succeeded by: Carolina Cuevas Merino

Personal details
- Born: 9 March 1956 (age 70) Talca, Chile
- Party: Evópoli (since 2016)
- Other political affiliations: RN (1990s–2016)
- Spouse: Guillermo Toro
- Children: 4
- Education: Pontifical Catholic University of Valparaíso; University of Chile
- Occupation: Lawyer • Politician

María Catalina Parot Donoso (born 9 March 1956) is a Chilean lawyer, entrepreneur and politician currently serving as Minister of National Assets.

She has served as president of the National Television Council, as well as Minister of National Assets during the first presidency of Sebastián Piñera, between March 2010 and November 2012.

== Biography ==
She is the second of eight children born to the marriage of Luis Óscar Fernando Parot Smits, an agricultural entrepreneur from Talca who served as mayor of Maule and was also a candidate for the National Party in the 1969 parliamentary elections, and María Eugenia Donoso Flores.

At six months of age, she contracted poliomyelitis, which resulted in a permanent physical disability affecting her legs and has required her to use crutches for mobility.

She later became the first woman with reduced mobility to hold a cabinet-level ministerial position in Chile, a milestone noted in the context of discussions on inclusion and equal opportunities.

She spent her early years in her hometown, completing her primary and secondary education at the Integrado School of Talca, where she began her political involvement as president of the student council.

She met her husband, Guillermo Fernando Toro Harnecker while she was studying law at the Pontifical Catholic University of Valparaíso and he was a student at Adolfo Ibáñez University. After qualifying as a lawyer, she completed postgraduate studies in political science at the University of Chile in Santiago.

Together with her husband, she has business interests in San Clemente, east of Talca, including a vineyard, a restaurant, and an equestrian club.

== Political career ==
As a member of National Renewal (RN), she served as a general councillor, member of the party’s political committee, deputy secretary-general, and national vice president. In December 2001, she unsuccessfully ran for the National Congress of Chile representing District 30, comprising Buin, Calera de Tango, Paine, and San Bernardo, in the Metropolitan Region of Santiago. Eight years later, she again ran unsuccessfully, this time for a seat representing the communes of Constitución, Curepto, Empedrado, Maule, Pelarco, Pencahue, Río Claro, San Clemente, and San Rafael in the Maule Region.

In February 2010, president-elect Sebastián Piñera appointed her Minister of National Assets, a position she assumed in Valparaíso on 11 March 2010. She left the post at the end of 2012 in order to consider a new candidacy in the 2013 Chilean general election, initially for western Santiago. This option was later set aside in favor of fellow party member Andrés Allamand. She subsequently ran for the Chamber of Deputies of Chile in District 38, but was not elected.

In 2016, she ended nearly two decades of membership in RN and announced her incorporation into Political Evolution (Evópoli), where she later assumed coordination of the party’s parliamentary strategy. During 2017, she temporarily suspended her party membership in order to support Sebastián Piñera’s candidacy in the Chile Vamos presidential primaries.

In May 2017, she joined the political debate program Tolerancia Cero as a panelist, remaining until the end of the year, after which she assumed the presidency of the National Television Council. During her tenure, a labor dispute involving the dismissal of journalist Tati Penna received public attention and subsequent media coverage.

She left the position in January 2021 to run as a candidate for Regional Governor of the Metropolitan Region in the 2021 Chilean regional elections. She placed fourth in the election. Subsequent media investigations addressed aspects of campaign financing and staffing arrangements, which were publicly reported by national media outlets.

On 7 July 2021, she was appointed Executive Secretary of the Administrative Secretariat Unit of the Constitutional Convention, following the resignation of Francisco Encina, serving in that role until her resignation on 9 August 2021.

On 21 January 2026, she was confirmed as part of the cabinet of president-elect José Antonio Kast, again assuming the position of Minister of National Assets. She is scheduled to assume office on 11 March 2026, following the presidential inauguration ceremony, succeeding Francisco Figueroa Cerda, who has held the position since 9 January 2025.
