= Elsa Labraña =

Chilean political activist (born 1974)

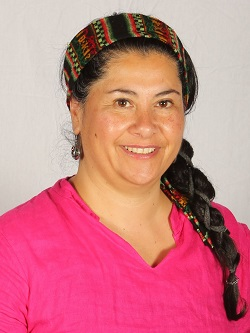

Member of the Constitutional Convention
- In office 4 July 2021 – 4 July 2022
- Constituency: District 17 (Maule, Constitución, Pencahue, Curepto, Curicó, Empedrado, Hualañé, Licantén, Vichuquén, Molina, Pelarco, Rauco, Río Claro, Romeral, Sagrada Familia, San Clemente, San Rafael, Talca and Teno)

Personal details
- Born: 19 September 1974 (age 51) Santiago, Chile
- Other political affiliations: The List of the People (2021–2022)
- Education: Catholic University of the Maule
- Occupation: Political activist
- Profession: Social worker

Elsa Labraña Pino (born 19 September 1974) is a Chilean social worker, activist, ecofeminist and independent politician.

She served as a member of the Constitutional Convention, representing the 17th District of the Maule Region. Labraña gained notoriety when she faced to the Judge Carmen Gloria Valladares. Nevertheless, then she said that was nothing against her (Valladares).

Among her proposals are to change the Chilean National Anthem and the flag, topics that she said at Mentiras Verdaderas, a program of the TV Channel La Red.

== Biography ==
Labraña was born on 19 September 1974 in the commune of Providencia, Santiago. She is the daughter of Ricardo Labraña and Elsa Pino.

She completed her primary education at Escuela Australia 244 (now Liceo Santa María de Las Condes) and her secondary education at Liceo Alexander Fleming of Las Condes, Liceo Fernando Lazcano of Curicó, and the Corporación Educacional La Araucana. She later qualified as a social worker at the Catholic University of Maule.

She specializes in community development and gender-based violence. Professionally, she has developed various social projects, including housing improvement programs, productive development initiatives for women, neighborhood health programs, self-sufficiency projects for rural communities, and community food programs. She has also participated in cultural and media-related projects, worked as an environmental and social rights educator, and served as the administrator of a shelter for women experiencing violence.

== Political activity ==
Labraña is an independent politician and a member of the ecofeminist organization Colectivo de Mujeres de Curicó. She has also participated in various social movements, including No+AFP, Asamblea Constituyente, No al TPP, Ríos Libres, and Protección de las Semillas, among others.

In the 2000 municipal elections, she ran for mayor of Curicó, obtaining 0.41% of the votes and was not elected.

In the elections held on 15–16 May 2021, she ran as an independent candidate for the Constitutional Convention representing the 17th District of the Maule Region, as part of the Lista del Pueblo. She received 7,366 votes, equivalent to 3.23% of the valid votes cast.

On 28 December 2021, she announced her resignation from the Pueblo Constituyente collective, subsequently remaining among the group of Independent Constitutional Convention members.
