= Diocese of Talca =

Roman Catholic diocese in Chile

Coordinates: 35°26′16″S 71°40′19″W

Diocese of Talca Dioecesis Talcensis Diócesis de Talca

Catholic
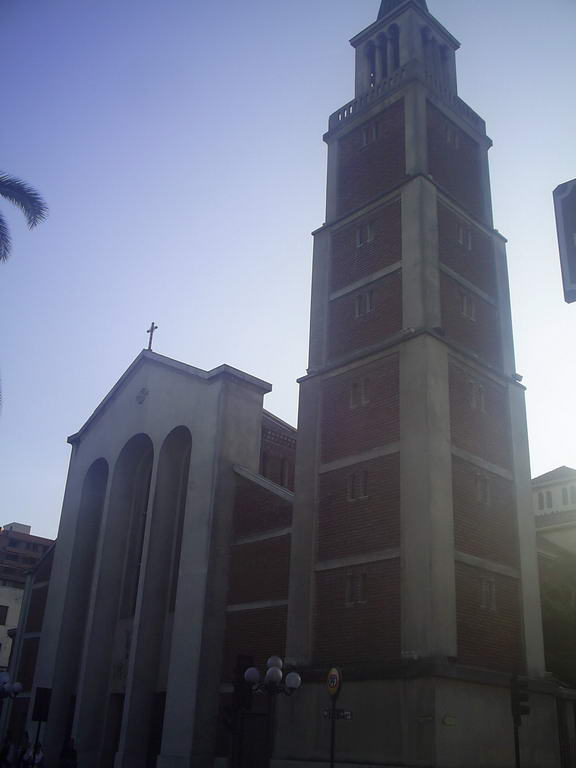
- Cathedral of St. Augustine

Location
- Country: Chile
- Ecclesiastical province: Santiago de Chile
- Metropolitan: Santiago de Chile

Statistics
- Area: 17,246 km^{2} (6,659 sq mi)
- Population: Total; Catholics: (as of 2014); 641,270; 457,953 (71.4 %%)

Information
- Rite: Latin Rite
- Established: 18 October 1925 (101 years ago)
- Cathedral: Cathedral of St Augustine in Talca
- Patron saint: St Augustine of Hippo

Current leadership
- Pope: Leo XIV
- Bishop: Galo Fernández Villaseca
- Metropolitan Archbishop: Fernando Chomalí Garib, OFM Cap
- Bishops emeritus: Horacio del Carmen Valenzuela Abarca

Website
- www.diocesisdetalca.cl

The Roman Catholic Diocese of Talca, (in Latin: Dioecesis Talcensis), is a suffragan diocese of the archdiocese of Santiago de Chile. Its current bishop, Galo Fernández Villaseca, was appointed on 20 March 2021. The diocesan cathedral is in the city of Talca.

== History ==
The dioceses of Talca, of Rancagua and of San Felipe were erected by Pope Pius XI on 18 October 1925 by means of the Bulla "Notabiliter Aucto".

== Diocesan statistics ==
The diocese lies in the Maule Region of Chile and covers a territory of 17,000 km². It is comprised by the province of Curicó and by eight municipalities (comunas) of the province of Talca (the parishes of the municipalities of Empedrado and Constitución are jurisdictionally attached to the neighboring diocese of Linares, from an ecclesiastical point of view). The diocese is divided into 45 parishes (as of April 2015), grouped in 5 pastoral zones.

== Bishops ==
- Miguel León Prado (apostolic administrator) † (12 June 1913 – 18 October 1925 appointed, auxiliary bishop of Santiago de Chile)
- Carlos Silva Cotapos † (14 December 1925 – 21 January 1939 resigned)
- Manuel Larraín Errázuriz † (21 January 1939 succeeded – 22 June 1966 died)
- Carlos González Cruchaga (4 January 1967 – 12 December 1996 retired)
- Horacio del Carmen Valenzuela Abarca (12 December 1996 appointed – 28 June 2018 retired)
- Galo Fernández Villaseca (20 March 2021 appointed – present)

=== Coadjutor bishop ===
- Manuel Larraín Errazuriz (1938-1939

=== Auxiliary bishops ===
- Bernardino Piñera Carvallo (1958-1960), appointed Bishop of Temuco
- Enrique Alvear Urrutia (1963-1965), appointed Bishop of San Felipe
- Alejandro Jiménez Lafeble (1975-1983), appointed Bishop of Valdivia
- Pablo Lizama Riquelme (1988-1991), appointed Bishop of Melipilla
- Alejandro Goić Karmelić (1991-1994), appointed Bishop of Osorno

=== Other priest of this diocese who became bishops ===
- Miguel León Prado (Vicar General here, 1913-1925), appointed Bishop of Linares

== Pastoral zones and Parishes ==
=== Pastoral zones ===
==== Urban Talca ====
- El Sagrario
- Corazón de María
- Nuestra Señora de Fátima
- San Luis
- Santa Ana
- St. Augustine Cathedral
- San Sebastián
- Inmaculada Concepción
- Los Doce Apóstoles
- Santa Teresita
- La Merced
- Espíritu Santo
- Sagrada Familia
- San Alberto Hurtado

==== Rural Talca ====
- San José, Colín (Maule)
- Sagrado Corazón, Maule
- San José, Duao (Maule)
- San Rafael, San Rafael
- San José, Pelarco
- San Clemente, San Clemente
- Inmaculada Concepción, Pencahue
- Bajos de Lircay, San Clemente
- Santa Amalia, El Sauce (Talca)
- Sagrado Corazón, Gualleco (Curepto)

==== Urban Curicó ====
- La Merced
- San Juan Bautista
- Nuestra Señora del Rosario
- Cristo Resucitado
- Jesús Obrero
- Jesús de Nazareth
- Iglesia San Francisco
- San José
- Santa Fé

==== Rural Curicó ====
- San Juan de Dios, Teno
- Nuestra Señora del Pilar, Romeral
- San Pedro, Rauco
- San Bonifacio, Lontué
- Unidad Pastoral, Sarmiento (Curicó)
- Nuestra Señora del Tránsito, Molina
- Sagrada Familia, Sagrada Familia
- Nuestra Señora de Lourdes, Cordillerilla (Los Niches, Curicó)
- San Pedro y San Pablo, Comunidad de Casablanca (Lontué)
- Nuestra Señora de la Merced, Cumpeo (Río Claro)

==== Coastal Zone ====
- Inmaculada Concepción, Villa Prat (Sagrada Familia)
- Santísimo Sacramento, Hualañé
- Nuestra Señora del Rosario, Curepto
- San Miguel Arcángel, Licantén
- Nuestra Señora del Carmen, Vichuquén
- San Policarpo, La Huerta de Mataquito (Hualañé)
- Vice-Parish of Llico (Vichuquén)
