= Batuco =

Batuco (Mapudungun for "the water") may refer to:

- Batuco, Santiago, a locality in Chacabuco Province, Santiago Metropolitan Region
- Batuco, Curepto, Maule, a village in Curepto, Maule Region
- Batuco, Pencahue, Maule, a village in Pencahue, Maule Region
- Estación Batuco, a railway station located between Colina and Lampa, Santiago Metropolitan Region
- Batuco, Ñuble, a village in Coelemu, Ñuble Region
- Stream of Batuco, located in Linares Province, Maule Region
