= Quivolgo Airport =

- IATA: none; ICAO: SCCT

Summary
- Airport type: Private
- Serves: Constitución, Chile
- Elevation AMSL: 42 ft / 13 m
- Coordinates: 35°18′30″S 72°23′30″W

Map
- Location of Quivolgo Airport in Chile

Runways
Direction	Length		Surface
Direction	m	ft	Surface
05/23	775	2,543	Grass
- Source: Landings.com Google Maps GCM

Quivolgo Airport (ICAO: SCCT) is an airport serving Constitución, a Pacific coastal city in the Maule Region of Chile. The airport is 3 kilometres (1.9 mi) northeast of Constitución, across the Maule River from the city.

The Constitucion non-directional beacon (ident: CTN) is located on the field.

== See also ==
- Transport in Chile
- List of airports in Chile
