= Enrique Alvear Urrutia =

Chilean Roman Catholic prelate

Servant of God Enrique Alvear Urrutia
- Auxiliary Bishop of Santiago
- Church: Roman Catholic Church
- Diocese: Santiago
- See: Santiago
- Appointed: 9 February 1974
- Term ended: 29 April 1982
- Other post: Titular Bishop of Sita (1974-82)
- Previous posts: Titular Bishop of Columnata (1963-65); Auxiliary Bishop of Talca (1963-65); Bishop of San Felipe (1965-74)

Orders
- Ordination: 20 September 1941 by José María Caro Rodríguez
- Consecration: 21 April 1963 by Raúl Silva Henríquez
- Rank: Bishop

Personal details
- Born: Enrique Alvear Urrutia; 31 January 1916 Cauquenes, Chile
- Died: 29 April 1982 (aged 66) Santiago, Chile
- Education: Pontifica Universidad Católica de Chile
- Motto: El Señor me envió a evangelizer a los pobres

Enrique Alvear Urrutia (31 January 1916 – 29 April 1982) was a Chilean Roman Catholic prelate who served as the Bishop of San Felipe from 1965 until 1974 when he was made one of the two auxiliaries for the Santiago de Chile archdiocese. He was a vocal critic during the dictatorship of Augusto Pinochet and braved potential detention and death threats to condemn human rights abuses and other atrocities the regime undertook.

The process for his potential beatification opened in 2012 and he is titled as a Servant of God. He has also been referred to as the "bishop of the poor" for his dedication to the poor and oppressed.

== Life ==
Enrique Alvear Urrutia was born on 31 January 1916 in Cauquenes in Chile as the eighth of eleven brothers to Clorindo Alvear Zurita and Teodorinda Urrutia Pérez.

He spent his education first in his hometown and then in the Luis Campino Humanities Institute before he pursued a law degree from 1934 in the Pontifica Universidad Católica de Chile. In one spiritual retreat of Monsignor Carlos Casanueva Opazo he discovered his call to the priesthood and he began his ecclesial studies.

He received his ordination to the priesthood in the Santiago Cathedral on 20 September 1941 from José María Caro Rodríguez and then started pastoral work in archdiocese. He was engaged in an active apostolate in parishes, in Catholic Action, in catechism and in the popular missions. He was a professor on the faculty of Theology of the Catholic University in addition to being a spiritual director for seminarians. " In 1961 he was appointed Vicar General of Santiago.

== Bishop ==
At the request of Bishop Manuel Larraín Errazuriz, Pope John XXIII appointed him in 1963 as a bishop assigned as one of the auxiliaries for the Talca diocese while making him the Titular Bishop of Columnata. He received his episcopal consecration at the Basilica of Lourdes a month after the appointment from Raúl Silva Henríquez; the co-consecrators were Manuel Larraín Errazuriz and Eladio Vicuña Aránquiz. He chose as his motto "The Lord sent me to evangelize the poor".

In 1965 he was appointed as the Bishop of San Felipe; he held that position until he resigned in 1974. But since he was under the retirement age Pope Paul VI named him as one of the two auxiliaries for the Santiago archdiocese as well as the Titular Bishop of Sita. He was active in the Episcopal Conference of Chile and served as a Council Father in the Second Vatican Council in the second to fourth sessions.

He opposed human rights abuses during the Pinochet dictatorship and defended the regime's victims all the while braving potential detention and death threats. In the evening on 11 September 1973 - against the advice of his aides - he went to prisons to inquire about people who were rounded up in a wave of arrests as part of Pinochet's coup against the sitting President Salvador Allende. There was also one occasion where bombs were placed in his office in a failed attempt to intimidate him into silence. "There are multiple documents, letters, homilies, and reflections found in the Documentation and Archive Center of the Vicariate of Solidarity and that express his particular form of courage and serenity when defending the persecuted." He later became involved with the Episcopal Conference of Latin America and the Caribbean.

He died of lymphoma on 29 April 1982 and his remains were interred in the Marian shrine Nuestra Señora de Lourdes in Quinta Normal until their transferral on 13 April 2008 to the San Luis Beltrán church. Pope Francis - during his trip to Chile in 2018 - made an unscheduled visit to the late bishop's tomb for some brief moments of reflection.

== Beatification process ==
Alvear's documentation and teachings are preserved by the Bishop Enrique Alvear Foundation. The beatification process was initiated in the Santiago archdiocese; initial steps towards opening the cause came on 16 December 2011 when the then-Archbishop (now cardinal) Ricardo Ezzati Andrello named the Enrique Alvear Urrutia Foundation as the official actor for promoting the cause. Ezzati later inaugurated the diocesan phase for the cause on 9 March 2012 and closed it later on 3 December 2014; during 2013 the Congregation for the Causes of Saints declared "nihil obstat" (no objections) to the cause.

The current postulator for the cause is the Jesuit priest Pascual Cebollada Silvestre.
