= Carlos González Cruchaga =

Chilean Bishop of the Roman Catholic Church

- Bishop Emeritus of Talca
- Church: Roman Catholic Church
- See: Diocese of Talca
- In office: 1967–1996
- Predecessor: Manuel Larraín Errazuriz
- Successor: Horacio del Carmen Valenzuela Abarca

Orders
- Ordination: September 23, 1944

Personal details
- Born: June 8, 1921 Santiago, Chile
- Died: September 21, 2008 (aged 87) Santiago, Chile

Carlos González Cruchaga (June 8, 1921 in Santiago, Chile – September 21, 2008) was a Chilean Bishop of the Roman Catholic Church.

Cruchaga was ordained a priest on September 23, 1944. He was appointed bishop of the Diocese of Talca on January 4, 1967, and ordained a bishop May 7, 1967. Cruchaga remained bishop of the Diocese of Talca until his retirement on December 12, 1996. In June 1991, he founded the Universidad Catolica del Maule (UCM). He died in September, 2008.
