= Pedro Antonio González =

Chilean writer, poet and journalist

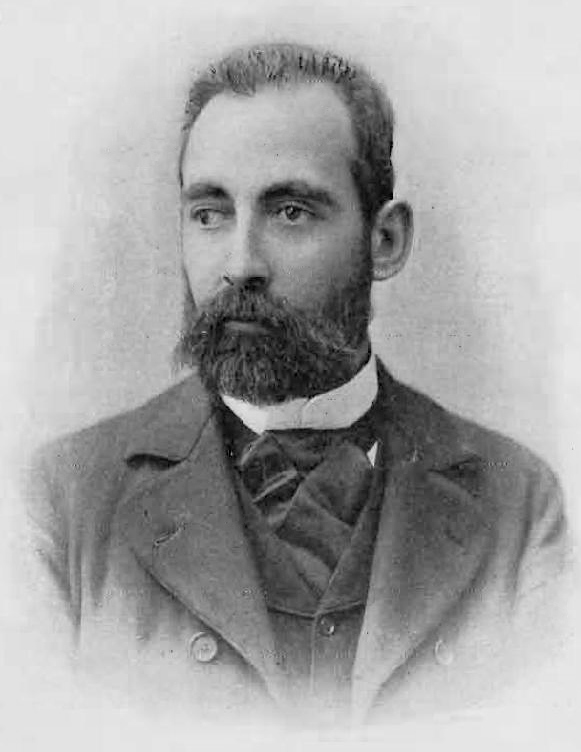
Portrait of Pedro Antonio González

Pedro Antonio González Valenzuela (1863–1903) was a Chilean writer, poet and journalist. He was born in Coipué, Curepto, Maule Region on May 22, 1863 and died in Santiago de Chile on October 3, 1903.

== Career ==
Pedro Antonio González was a poet who led a bohemian life and his work was influenced by romanticism. He lived and died in misery. He wrote in the La Tribuna, La Ley, La Revista Cómica and Santiago Cómico newspapers, which were circulated in Santiago in the late nineteenth century. He only saw one of his poetic books published, Ritmos in 1895, which was one of the first manifestations of modernism in his country. He sought to renew the form and attempted various metrical experiments. He has been called the Father of Chilean Modernism.

In the book The lyric and the epic, Miguel Luis Rocuant says of Pedro Antonio González:

Among Chilean poets, the one who could most resist others humorously analysis of his work, neither which is yet unmatched in the serenity of the line nor in of the verse modernistic wealth, was Gonzalez (...) His aloofness was neither skepticism nor fear of fame, but a result of his personal woes (...) the poet was silent, then, and forgotten in his verse, he went here and there, in bohemian despondence, searching among vessels for the lost inspirational call.

A satirist, he was the author of the famous Ode to the PEO, published in La Revista Cómica.

== Works ==
- Ritmos, 1895. – Rhythms.
- Poetas chilenos, 1902. – Chilean poets.
- Poesías, 1905. – Poems.
- Poesías, edición realizada por Armando Donoso, 1917. – Poetry, Armando Donoso edition.
- El Monje, 1919. – The Monk.

== Recognition ==
The Pedro Antonio González F-320 School in Curepto is named after this prominent poet from the area.
