= St. Augustine Cathedral, Talca =

Coordinates: 35.4261°S 71.6670°W

St. Augustine Cathedral
- Catedral de San Agustín
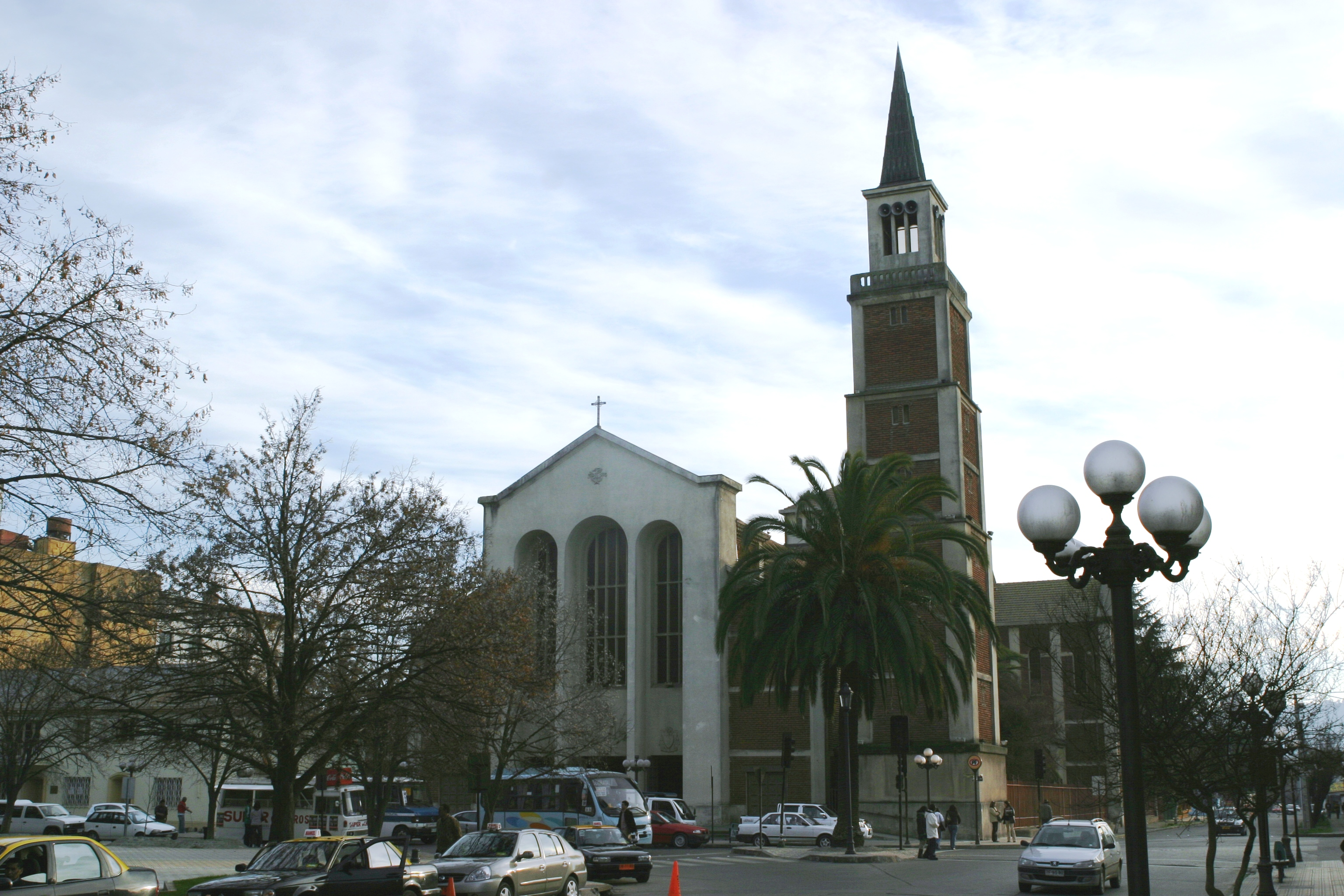
- St. Augustine Cathedral
- Location: Talca
- Country: Chile
- Denomination: Roman Catholic Church

The St. Augustine Cathedral (Spanish: Catedral de San Agustín) Also Talca Cathedral is a cathedral of the Catholic church in Chile dedicated to St. Augustine. It is located in the Plaza de Armas de Talca, and is the seat of the bishop of the Diocese of Talca in Chile.

It was built by the architect Ramón Venegas and began in 1938 in the same place where the Mother Church was destroyed by the 1928 Talca earthquake. It was finally consecrated on September 30, 1954. The carillon was erected the following year thanks to a donation of the philanthropist Gabriel Pando.

The earthquake of 11 March 2010 left the temple with structural damage that included its walls of masonry and its arches of reinforced concrete, with risk of collapse. In 2012 the restoration work was completed, reinforcing the walls with reinforced concrete and replacing the wooden structure of the roof.

== See also ==
- Roman Catholicism in Chile

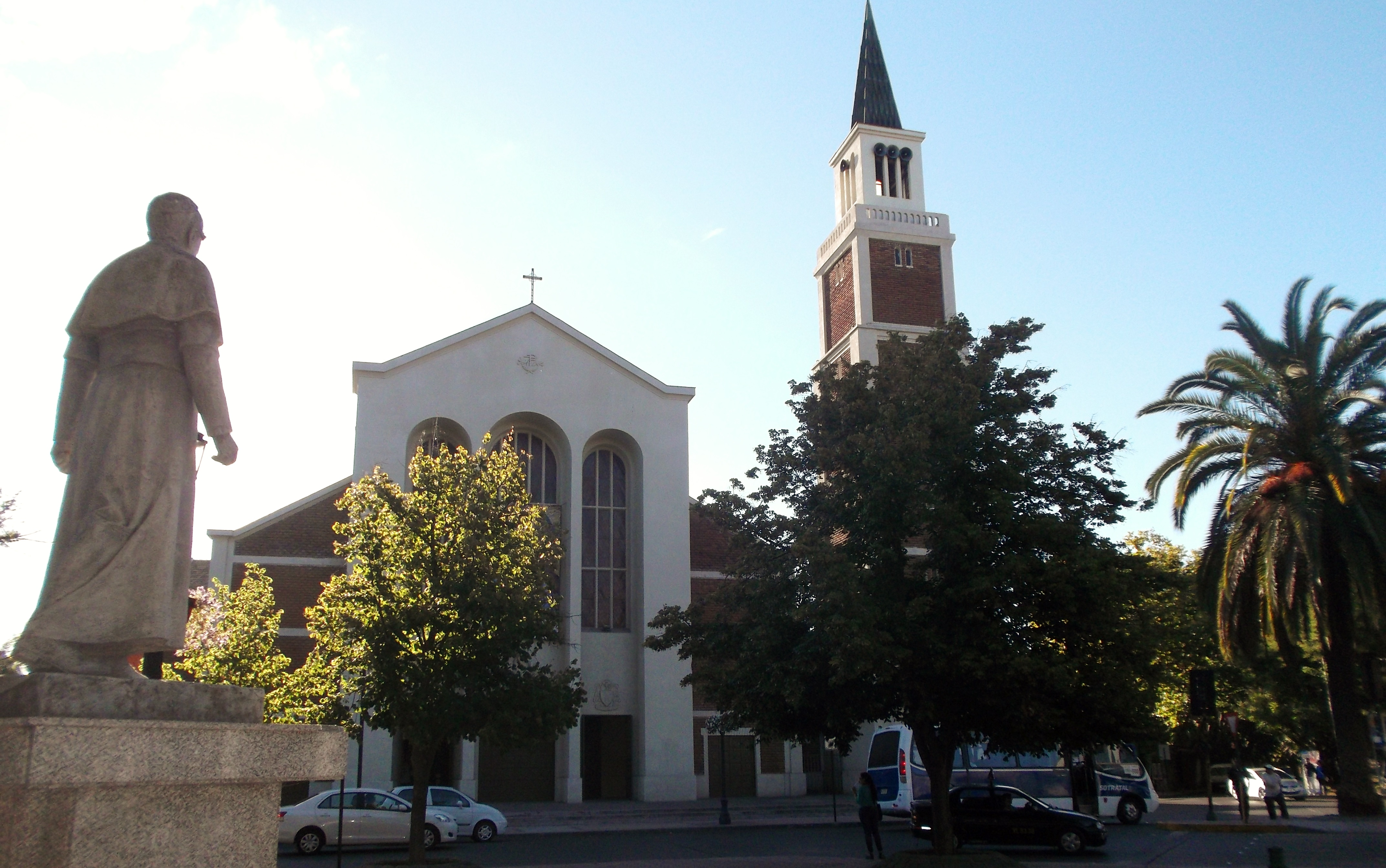
Another view
