= List of earthquakes in 1928 =

Earthquakes in 1928
Approximate epicenters of the earthquakes in 1928
- 4.0–5.9 magnitude
- 6.0–6.9 magnitude
- 7.0–7.9 magnitude
- 8.0+ magnitude
- Strongest: Mexico, Oaxaca, (Magnitude 8.0) June 17
- Deadliest: Chile Maule Region, (Magnitude 7.7) December 1, 279 deaths
- Total fatalities: 807

Number by magnitude
- 9.0+: 0

This is a list of earthquakes in 1928. Only magnitude 6.0 or greater earthquakes appear on the list. Lower magnitude events are included if they have caused death, injury or damage. Events which occurred in remote areas will be excluded from the list as they wouldn't have generated significant media interest. All dates are listed according to UTC time. It was an active year with several events leading to deaths. Worst affected were Chile, Turkey, Bulgaria and the Philippines. Oaxaca, Mexico and Puno Region, Peru sustained several large earthquakes with the former seeing four reaching above magnitude 7.0. In spite of a series of earthquakes, only four deaths were caused in Mexico during the year.

== Overall ==
=== By death toll ===
Rank	Death toll	Magnitude	Location	MMI	Depth (km)	Date
1	279	7.7	Chile, Maule Region	IX (Violent)	35.0	December 1
2	170	6.4	Turkey, İzmir Province	IX (Violent)	10.0	March 31
3	127	7.1	Bulgaria, Stara Zagora Province and Plovdiv Province	XI (Extreme)	15.0	April 14, April 18
4	97	7.4	Philippines, Mindanao	VII (Very strong)	25.0	December 19
5	51	6.0	Italy, off the west coast of Calabria	( )	120.0	March 7
6	29	7.3	Peru, Amazonas Region	X (Extreme)	120.0	May 14
7	20	6.0	Greece, Peloponnese (region)	IX (Violent)	29.0	April 22
= 8	10	6.7	Peru, Puno Region	IX (Violent)	25.0	April 9
= 8	10	5.4	Iran, North Khorasan Province	VIII (Severe)	9.0	August 21

- Note: At least 10 casualties

=== By magnitude ===
Rank	Magnitude	Death toll	Location	MMI	Depth (km)	Date
1	8.0	4	Mexico, Oaxaca	( )	20.0	June 17
= 2	7.7	0	southern Indian Ocean	( )	15.0	March 9
= 2	7.7	279	Chile, Maule Region	IX (Violent)	35.0	December 1
= 3	7.6	0	France, southeast of the Loyalty Islands	( )	10.0	March 16
= 3	7.6	0	Mexico, Oaxaca	( )	15.0	March 22
4	7.5	0	Mexico, Oaxaca	( )	25.0	October 9
5	7.4	97	Philippines, Mindanao	VII (Very strong)	25.0	December 19
6	7.3	29	Peru, Amazonas Region	X (Extreme)	120.0	May 14
7	7.2	0	Mexico, off the coast of Oaxaca	( )	20.0	August 4
= 8	7.1	127	Bulgaria, Stara Zagora Province	X (Extreme)	10.0	April 14
= 8	7.1	127	Bulgaria, Plovdiv Province	XI (Extreme)	15.0	April 18
= 8	7.1	0	Japan, off the east coast of Honshu	( )	35.0	May 27
= 8	7.1	0	New Hebrides, east of	( )	15.0	June 29
= 9	7.0	0	British Kenya, Baringo County	( )	15.0	January 6
= 9	7.0	0	Japan, Izu Islands	( )	433.9	March 29
= 9	7.0	0	Peru, Cajamarca Region	VI (Strong)	120.0	July 18
= 9	7.0	0	New Hebrides	( )	190.0	August 24
= 9	7.0	0	Chile, off the coast of Maule Region	( )	30.0	December 2
= 9	7.0	0	Dutch East Indies, off the south coast of Papua (province)	( )	15.0	December 7

- Note: At least 7.0 magnitude

== Notable events ==
=== January ===
January
- Strongest: 7.0 M_{w} British Kenya
- Total fatalities: 0

Number by magnitude
- 8.0–8.9: 0
- 7.0–7.9: 1
- 6.0–6.9: 4

Date	Country and location	M_{w}	Depth (km)	MMI	Notes	Casualties	
Date	Country and location	M_{w}	Depth (km)	MMI	Notes	Dead	Injured
1	Russian SFSR, Sea of Okhotsk	6.5	530.0				
5	Bolivia, Santa Cruz Department, Bolivia	6.8	540.0				
6	British Kenya, Baringo County	7.0	15.0				
10	British Kenya, Uasin Gishu County	6.2	10.0		Aftershock.		
12	Chile, Coquimbo Region	6.3	30.0				

=== February ===
February
- Strongest: 6.6 M_{w} Russian SFSR
- Total fatalities: 0

Number by magnitude
- 8.0–8.9: 0
- 7.0–7.9: 0
- 6.0–6.9: 4

Date	Country and location	M_{w}	Depth (km)	MMI	Notes	Casualties	
Date	Country and location	M_{w}	Depth (km)	MMI	Notes	Dead	Injured
3	Russian SFSR, Sakha Republic	6.2	35.0				
10	Mexico, Puebla	6.5	100.0		Fairly heavy damage was reported.		
21	Russian SFSR, Chukchi Sea	6.6	10.0				
26	Russian SFSR, Chukchi Sea	6.5	10.0				

=== March ===
March
- Strongest: 7.7 M_{w} southern Indian Ocean
- Deadliest: 6.4 M_{w} Turkey; 170 deaths
- Total fatalities: 225+

Number by magnitude
- 8.0–8.9: 0
- 7.0–7.9: 4
- 6.0–6.9: 5
- 5.0–5.9: 2

Date	Country and location	M_{w}	Depth (km)	MMI	Notes	Casualties	
Date	Country and location	M_{w}	Depth (km)	MMI	Notes	Dead	Injured
7	Italy, off the west coast of Calabria	6.0	120.0		At least 51 deaths were caused as well as some damage.	51+	
7	China, Gansu Province	6.2	15.0				
8	Iran, South Khorasan Province	5.0	0.0		4 deaths were reported as well as some damage. The depth was unknown.	4	
9	southern Indian Ocean	7.7	15.0				
13	New Guinea, southeast of New Ireland (island)	6.5	75.0				
16	France, southeast of the Loyalty Islands	7.6	10.0				
22	Mexico, Oaxaca	7.6	15.0				
26	Dutch East Indies, Molucca Sea	6.2	35.0				
27	Italy, Friuli-Venezia Giulia	5.8	33.0	IX	40 people were injured and many homes were destroyed.		40
29	Japan, Izu Islands	7.0	405.0				
31	Turkey, İzmir Province	6.4	10.0	IX	170 deaths were reported and a further 700 people were hurt. 2,600 homes collapsed and many were damaged.	170	700

=== April ===
April
- Strongest: 7.1 M_{w} Bulgaria 2 events
- Deadliest: 7.1 M_{w} Bulgaria; 127 deaths
- Total fatalities: 157

Number by magnitude
- 8.0–8.9: 0
- 7.0–7.9: 2
- 6.0–6.9: 5

Date	Country and location	M_{w}	Depth (km)	MMI	Notes	Casualties	
Date	Country and location	M_{w}	Depth (km)	MMI	Notes	Dead	Injured
9	Peru, Puno Region	6.7	25.0	IX	The main destruction was caused by a flood. Landslides blocked a river and the ensuing flooding led to 10 deaths and many homes being destroyed.	10	
14	Bulgaria, Stara Zagora Province	7.1	10.0	X	The 1928 Chirpan–Plovdiv earthquakes caused major destruction. These events are an example of a doublet earthquake. The effects of both events are listed here. 127 people were killed and 1,735 were injured. 74,750 homes were destroyed.	127	1,735
17	Mexico, Veracruz	6.5	35.0				
18	Bulgaria, Plovdiv Province	7.1	15.0	XI	The fatalities and damages from this event are included in the previous event.		
22	Russian SFSR, Sea of Okhotsk	6.5	350.0				
22	Greece, Peloponnese (region)	6.0	29.0	IX	20 people were killed and 3,000 homes were destroyed.	20	
27	Peru, Puno Region	6.5	25.0	V			

=== May ===
May
- Strongest: 7.3 M_{w} Peru
- Deadliest: 7.3 M_{w} Peru; 29 deaths
- Total fatalities: 29

Number by magnitude
- 8.0–8.9: 0
- 7.0–7.9: 2
- 6.0–6.9: 2

Date	Country and location	M_{w}	Depth (km)	MMI	Notes	Casualties	
Date	Country and location	M_{w}	Depth (km)	MMI	Notes	Dead	Injured
8	Russian SFSR, Sea of Okhotsk	6.5	570.0				
14	Peru, Amazonas Region	7.3	120.0	X	29 people were killed in the 1928 Chachapoyas earthquake. Property damage costs were $8 million (1928 rate).	29	
26	Chile, Antofagasta Region	6.2	130.0				
27	Japan, off the east coast of Honshu	7.2	35.0				

=== June ===
June
- Strongest: 8.0 M_{w} Mexico
- Deadliest: 8.0 M_{w} Mexico; 4 deaths
- Total fatalities: 4

Number by magnitude
- 8.0–8.9: 1
- 7.0–7.9: 1
- 6.0–6.9: 8

Date	Country and location	M_{w}	Depth (km)	MMI	Notes	Casualties	
Date	Country and location	M_{w}	Depth (km)	MMI	Notes	Dead	Injured
1	Japan, off the east coast of Honshu	6.3	20.0		Aftershock.		
3	Japan, west of Kyushu	6.3	10.0				
7	China, Heilongjiang Province	6.0	430.0				
15	Philippines, Mindoro	6.9	25.0	VIII	Some homes were destroyed. A tsunami washed away a rail line.		
15	Philippines, Mindoro	6.7	15.0		Aftershock.		
17	Mexico, Oaxaca	8.0	20.0		4 people were killed and some damage was reported. A tsunami was generated.	4	
21	Fiji	6.7	15.0				
21	United States, southern Alaska	6.8	15.0				
24	Afghanistan, Badakhshan Province	6.5	120.0				
29	New Hebrides, east of	7.1	15.0				

=== July ===
July
- Strongest: 7.0 M_{w} Peru
- Deadliest: 5.8 M_{w} China; 6 deaths
- Total fatalities: 6

Number by magnitude
- 8.0–8.9: 0
- 7.0–7.9: 1
- 6.0–6.9: 3
- 5.0–5.9: 1

Date	Country and location	M_{w}	Depth (km)	MMI	Notes	Casualties	
Date	Country and location	M_{w}	Depth (km)	MMI	Notes	Dead	Injured
1	British Solomon Islands, south coast of Guadalcanal	6.5	15.0				
18	Peru, Cajamarca Region	7.0	120.0	VI			
19	China, Sichuan Province	5.8	0.0	VII	6 people were killed and 10 were injured. Some homes were destroyed.	6	10
27	Dutch East Indies, north of Sumatra	6.0	100.0				
28	Chile, Coquimbo Region	6.5	50.0				

=== August ===
August
- Strongest: 7.2 M_{w} Mexico
- Deadliest: 5.4 M_{w} Iran; 10 deaths
- Total fatalities: 10

Number by magnitude
- 8.0–8.9: 0
- 7.0–7.9: 2
- 6.0–6.9: 4
- 5.0–5.9: 1

Date	Country and location	M_{w}	Depth (km)	MMI	Notes	Casualties	
Date	Country and location	M_{w}	Depth (km)	MMI	Notes	Dead	Injured
4	Mexico, off the coast of Oaxaca	7.2	20.0				
5	Philippines, west of Luzon	6.2	35.0				
10	Afghanistan, Badakhshan Province	6.8	255.0				
12	Dutch East Indies, northwest of Halmahera	6.3	15.0				
15	Argentina, Santiago del Estero Province	6.5	620.0				
21	Iran, North Khorasan Province	5.4	9.0	VIII	10 people were killed and some damage was reported.	10	
24	New Hebrides	7.0	190.0				

=== September ===
September
- Strongest: 6.8 M_{w} 2 events
- Total fatalities: 0

Number by magnitude
- 8.0–8.9: 0
- 7.0–7.9: 0
- 6.0–6.9: 7

Date	Country and location	M_{w}	Depth (km)	MMI	Notes	Casualties	
Date	Country and location	M_{w}	Depth (km)	MMI	Notes	Dead	Injured
1	Pakistan, Punjab, Pakistan	6.5	35.0				
7	New Guinea, Umboi Island	6.2	15.0				
13	Dutch East Indies, Molucca Sea	6.5	35.0				
21	Peru, Puno Region	6.8	225.0				
22	British Solomon Islands, Santa Cruz Islands	6.8	15.0				
25	Japan, Bungo Channel	6.0	120.0				
27	Windward Islands	6.5	35.0				

=== October ===
October
- Strongest: 7.5 M_{w} Mexico
- Total fatalities: 0

Number by magnitude
- 8.0–8.9: 0
- 7.0–7.9: 1
- 6.0–6.9: 3

Date	Country and location	M_{w}	Depth (km)	MMI	Notes	Casualties	
Date	Country and location	M_{w}	Depth (km)	MMI	Notes	Dead	Injured
4	Ethiopian Empire, SNNPR	6.0	35.0				
9	Mexico, Oaxaca	7.5	25.0				
15	Pakistan, Baluchistan, Pakistan	6.8	35.0				
25	Nicaragua, off the west coast	6.5	30.0				

=== November ===
November
- Strongest: 6.9 M_{w} Dutch East Indies
- Total fatalities: 0

Number by magnitude
- 8.0–8.9: 0
- 7.0–7.9: 0
- 6.0–6.9: 5

Date	Country and location	M_{w}	Depth (km)	MMI	Notes	Casualties	
Date	Country and location	M_{w}	Depth (km)	MMI	Notes	Dead	Injured
1	Mexico, Chihuahua (state)	6.4	10.0				
6	New Hebrides	6.7	55.0				
14	Pakistan, Khyber Pakhtunkhwa	6.0	110.0				
20	Chile, Antofagasta Region	6.8	45.0				
28	Dutch East Indies, Flores	6.9	20.0				

=== December ===
December
- Strongest: 7.7 M_{w} Chile
- Deadliest: 7.7 M_{w} Chile; 279 deaths
- Total fatalities: 376

Number by magnitude
- 8.0–8.9: 0
- 7.0–7.9: 4
- 6.0–6.9: 4

Date	Country and location	M_{w}	Depth (km)	MMI	Notes	Casualties	
Date	Country and location	M_{w}	Depth (km)	MMI	Notes	Dead	Injured
1	Chile, Maule Region	7.7	35.0	IX	The 1928 Talca earthquake caused 279 deaths. Many homes were destroyed.	279	
2	Chile, off the coast of Maule Region	7.0	30.0		Aftershock.		
7	Dutch East Indies, off the south coast of Papua (province)	7.0	15.0				
9	British Solomon Islands	6.7	15.0				
10	Dutch East Indies, northern Sumatra	6.0	35.0				
12	New Zealand, Kermadec Islands	6.8	30.0				
19	Philippines, Mindanao	7.4	25.0	VII	97 people were killed due to the effects of the earthquake and a tsunami. 102 people were injured. Many homes collapsed.	97	102
28	Philippines, Mindanao	6.7	15.0		This occurred in a separate part of the island from the previous event. This is an example of remotely triggered earthquakes.		
