= Celulosa Arauco y Constitución =

Chilean forest products company

Celulosa Arauco y Constitución S.A.
- Type: joint stock company
- Founded: 1979
- Headquarters: Santiago, Chile
- Key people: Anacleto Angelini; Julio Ponce
- Products: woodpulp engineered wood products wood
- Number of employees: 13227 direct employees+ 27000 contract workers
- Parent: Empresas Copec
- Subsidiaries: Forestal Valdivia
- Website: www.arauco.cl

Celulosa Arauco y Constitución (also called CELCO or ARAUCO) is a Chilean wood pulp, engineered wood and forestry company controlled by Anacleto Angelini's economic group Empresas Copec. In 2006 CELCO/ARAUCO had five pulp mills in Chile and one in Argentina. Apart from pulp mills, CELCO/ARAUCO has 4 engineered wood manufacturing plants in Chile, 2 in Argentina and 2 in Brazil.

The company was founded in September 1979 as a result of the fusion of Celulosa Arauco S.A. (1967) and Celulosa Constitución S.A. (1969). Both companies had been privatized during the Pinochet era from CORFO in 1977 and 1979, respectively.

== Investments ==
In May 2009 Arauco and the Finnish company Stora Enso announced a €253 million deal that would make their joint venture the largest landowner in Uruguay for a pulp mill, harbour and power station at Conchillas.

In September 2009 Arauco purchased the Brazilian panel company Tafisa Brasil in a deal worth US$227 million.

In 2022, Arauco announced the construction of a new pulp mill in the southern region of Chile, with an estimated investment of $2.35 billion, making it one of the largest industrial investments in the country.

== Pollution controversies ==
=== Valdivia ===
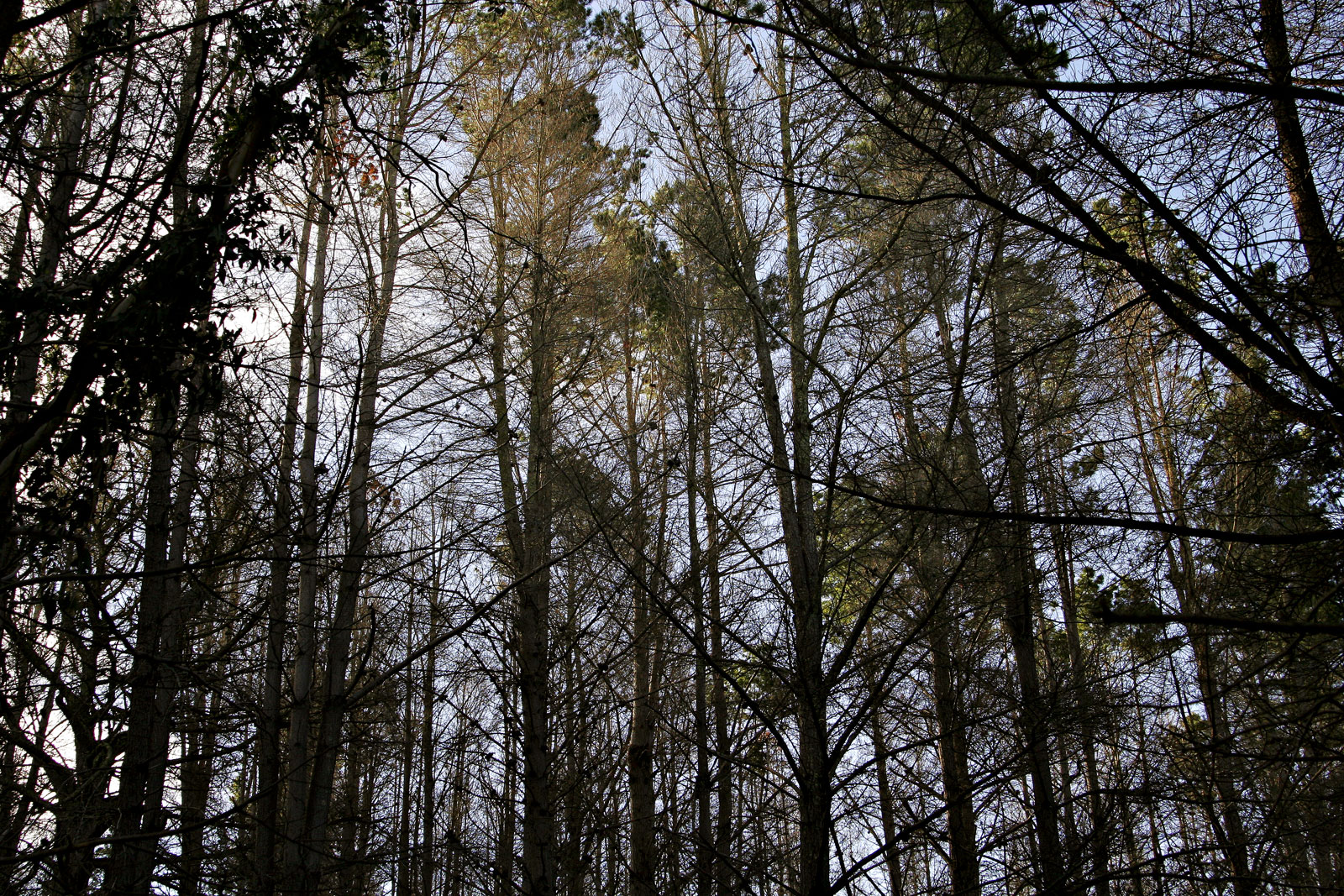
Arauco's timber and pulp production requirements are met through the exploitation of extensive plantations of the introduced radiata pine

Beginning in 2004, and just months after the opening of CELCO's Valdivia plant, thousands of black-necked swans in the internationally protected Ramsar site and national reserve Carlos Anwandter in Chile died or migrated. The Valdivia pulp mill, located upriver, was widely blamed. The mill is located near the city of Mariquina and discharges directly into the Cruces River which feeds the wetlands. The company had been dumping more dioxins and heavy metals than had been approved by the regulating agencies into the river from a waste tube that had been approved by the authorities. It had also been producing far above levels approved in its Environmental Impact Assessment, and was cited for multiple violations of environmental and health laws. The scandal prompted Celco's chief executive to resign in June 2005 and the company to pledge to adopt cleaner technologies. The plant was temporarily closed by authorities but then allowed to reopen two months later at limited production capacity. Several legal actions were finally settled in the company's favor at the Chilean Supreme Court. However, it later was revealed that this decision was based on a report that CELCO had itself produced and falsely claimed was authored by the University of Concepcion. This caused Chile's president Ricardo Lagos to declare that the company had gone too far and was harming the country's image.

A report contracted by the Chilean government to the regional university (Universidad Austral de Chile) found that the company's pollution was responsible for rapid ecological change in the wetlands leading to the decline of populations of swans and other water birds. This finding was reviewed and validated by other independent entities including an international commission organized by the World Wildlife Fund (WWF). However, scientists at the Pontifical Catholic University funded by CELCO have disputed the causality between the plant's pollution and the swan population decline. In July 2007 CELCO agreed to pay CLP$614 million to Valdivian tourism companies to avoid legal actions for supposed losses of the tourism sector of Valdivia due to contamination of Carlos Anwandter Nature Sanctuary. In a document signed by the tourism companies CELCO was exempted from all responsibility involving the contamination of Cruces River. CELCO also promised to pay CLP$2 million monthly for three years to promote tourism. Chile's equivalent of an Attorney General's office was suing the company to compensate for the environmental harm done. By 2012 the black-necked swan population had still not recovered beyond a few hundred individuals, down from its estimated population of 7,000 individuals before the crisis.

=== Mataquito ===
In December 1999 the pulp mill Licancel (located in the coast of Curicó, Maule Region) was accused of causing the death of hundreds of fish due to the dumping of wastewater into Mataquito River. In June 2007 Licancel once again caused the death of fish in the river. The sanitary authorities ordered a temporary closure of the plant for 30 days, and CELCO dismissed three executives. Two weeks later 200,000 liters (44,000 imp gal; 53,000 U.S. gal) of industrial waste water escaped from a broken pipeline, of which 50,000 reached the river. CELCO said that it was an industrial accident, that they would close the plant until further notice, and that the spill would not have any impact on the environment. The Secretary of State for the Environment said that, despite having large financial and technical resources, CELCO had an extremely poor environmental record.
