= 1928 Chachapoyas earthquake =

Earthquake in Peru

- Location within Peru
- UTC time: 1928-05-14 22:15:04
- ISC event: 908668
- USGS-ANSS: ComCat
- Local date: May 14, 1928
- Local time: 17:14
- Magnitude: 7.2 M_{w}
- Depth: 35 km (22 mi)
- Epicenter: 5.26°S 78.56°W
- Areas affected: Peru
- Max. intensity: MMI X (Extreme)
- Aftershocks: 6.9 M_{s} July 18 at 19:05 UTC
- Casualties: 25 dead

The 1928 Chachapoyas earthquake occurred on May 14 at 17:14 local time. It had a magnitude of M_{w} 7.2, M_{s} 7.3, or M_{L} 7.3. Chachapoyas, Peru was almost completely destroyed. A landslide in Pinpincos caused the death of 25 people. Many houses were damaged in Machala, Ecuador. The maximum intensity was X (Extreme) on the Mercalli intensity scale. The earthquake could be felt in Lima. It could also be felt in Ecuador, Brazil, and Colombia.

== Aftershock ==
A strong aftershock occurred on July 18, 1928, at 14:05 local time (19:05 UTC). Some houses which had already been damaged in the main shock collapsed.

== See also ==
- List of earthquakes in 1928
- List of earthquakes in Peru
