= Anacleto Angelini =

Anacleto Angelini Fabbri (January 17, 1914 – August 28, 2007) was an Italian-born Chilean businessman. At the time of his death, he was South America's wealthiest person, with an estimated net worth of US$6 billion. He was chairman at AntarChile, one of Latin America's largest conglomerates.

== Life ==
Angelini was born in Ferrara, Italy to Giuseppe Angelini and Adalisa Fabbri. A veteran of the Italian army's campaign in Ethiopia, he immigrated to Chile in 1948, and made his fortune based on fisheries, forestry, mining and fuel distribution. In 1986 he bought a majority in the Chilean company Copec.

Without an heir, he ceded day-to-day control of his holding company, Antarchile, to a nephew, Roberto Angelini Rossi. Anacleto Angelini resided in a modest apartment in a middle-class neighbourhood in Santiago.

== Controversy ==
Angelini's Celulosa Arauco y Constitución pulp mill was closed in 2005 after the company lawyers reportedly produced a misleading environmental study regarding pollution on the Cruces River. The scandal prompted Celco's chief executive to resign in June 2005 and the company to pledge to adopt cleaner technologies. The plant reopened two months later at limited production capacity.

== Death ==
On 28 August 2007, Angelini died in the clinical hospital of the Catholic University of Chile from emphysema, which had been aggravated by a severe cold.
