= Abcdin =

- Type: Public
- Industry: Housewares
- Founded: Santiago de Chile (1950)
- Headquarters: Santiago de Chile
- Website: www.abcdin.cl

Abcdin (AW-Beh-CEH-Deen) was a Chilean homewares chain. It was founded in 1950 as a subsidiary of Copec. Today, it is owned by Yaconí-Santa Cruz.

== History ==
=== Early years (1950-1995) ===
During the 1950s to promote the use of natural gas Empresas Copec began to sell products that needed natural gas such as stoves and heaters. In 1966 formal retail sales at ABC began under the name Abastible ("supplier"). The company sold Línea Blanca ("white line") products and appliances.

In 1976, the private holding company Abastecedora de Combustibles Comercial Limitada ("Commercial Fuel Supplier Limited") created as the household products and homewares retail division and was subsequently renamed ABC. In from 1982 to 1989 ABC operation began an independent venture under the name ABC Comercial Ltda. ("ABC Commercial Ltd."); In 1989 the Tarjeta ABC credit card is launched to help customers finance purchases. The stores were also rebranded Supertiendas ABC ("ABC superstores") a moniker that would last until 1996.

=== Expansion (1996-present) ===
In 1996, the supertiendas were dropped from the name in favor of simply ABC again along with a new slogan Sabemos Más ("We know more").

That same year the company lost its first place for sales in the home goods sector due to the acquisition by part of Equs' DIN stores division that sold appliances, "white line", electronics, and furniture.

In 2005, Empresas Copec sold Grupo Yaconi-Santa Cruz, the owner for Din stores to ABC Comercial Ltda. including retail and credit divisions.

In 2006, after merging their finance divisions with Din, the company's corporate slogan was changed to «El abc de la tecnología» ("The abc of technology"), a tagline maintained until the official merger of the retail division.

in 2008, both brands were merged into "abcdín" and the slogan was changed to «Sólo por ti» ("Just for you") with Stefan Kramer leading the first ad campaign.

In 2009, Abcdin changed its slogan back to the original Supertiendas ABC catchphrase «El abc de la Economía», but later change it again to «La felicidad cuesta menos».
