= 1928 Talca earthquake =

Earthquake in Chile

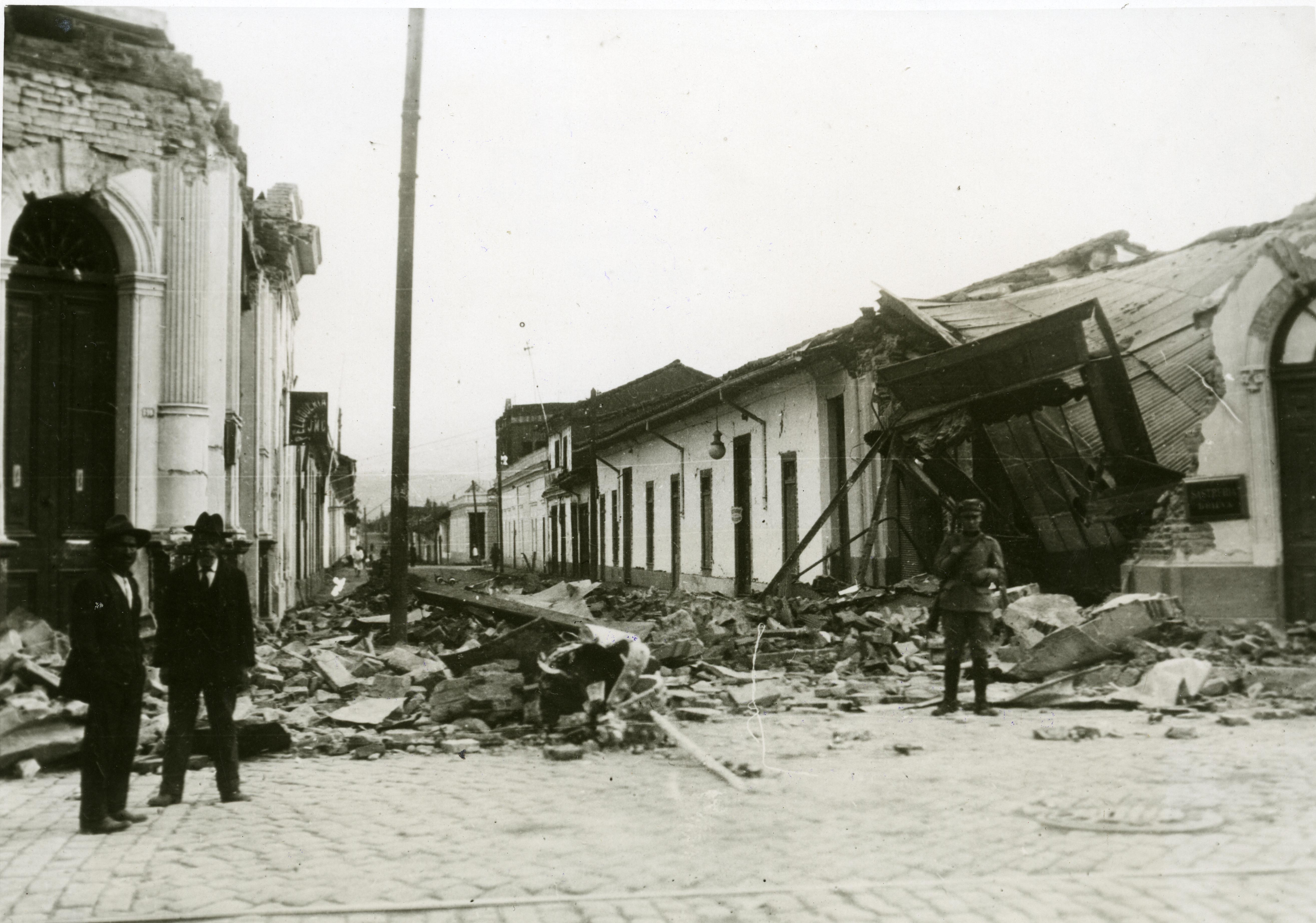

- Location within South America Location within Chile
- UTC time: 1928-12-01 04:06:17
- ISC event: 908986
- USGS-ANSS: ComCat
- Local date: 1 December 1928
- Local time: 00:06
- Duration: 1 minute 45 seconds
- Magnitude: 7.6 M_{w}, 8.3 M_{S}, 7.9 M_{L}
- Depth: 20 km (centroid)
- Epicenter: 35°00′S 72°00′W
- Areas affected: Chile, Curepto
- Max. intensity: MMI IX (Violent)
- Aftershocks: 7.0 M_{w}^{(USGS)} 1928-12-02
- Casualties: 279 dead

The 1928 Talca earthquake occurred on 1 December at 00:06 local time near Curepto, Maule Region, Chile, with an estimated magnitude of 7.6 M_{W}, 8.3 M_{S} and 7.9 M_{L}. In Talca, it lasted 1 minute 45 seconds.

There was damage across an area between Valparaíso and Concepción, and severe damage along the coast from Cauquenes to Pichilemu, and in the cities of Talca, Curicó and San Fernando in the Chilean Central Valley.

In Talca there were 108 dead, 67 in Constitución, and 50 in the surrounding villages. Soon after the earthquake, the Barahona dam, in the valley of Cachapoal River, that contained copper tailings, collapsed, killing 54 miners.

In total, there were 279 dead, 1,083 injured and 127,043 homeless.

== See also ==
- List of earthquakes in 1928
- List of earthquakes in Chile
