= Talca Province =

Talca Province Provincia de Talca
- Province
- Seal

- Location in the Maule Region

- Location in Chile
- Coordinates: 35°26′S 71°36′W
- Country: Chile
- Region: Maule
- Capital: Talca
- Communes: List of 10: Talca; San Clemente; Pelarco; Pencahue; Maule; San Rafael; Curepto; Constitución; Empedrado; Río Claro

Government
  - Type: Provincial

Area
  - Total: 9,937.8 km^{2} (3,837.0 sq mi)

Population (2024 Census)
  - Total: 445,021
  - Density: 44.781/km^{2} (115.98/sq mi)
- Time zone: UTC−4 (CLT)
  - Summer (DST): UTC-3 (CLST)
- Area code: 56 + 71
- Website: Governorate of Talca

Talca Province (Spanish: Provincia de Talca) is one of three provinces of the Maule Region in Chile. It spans an area of 9,937.8 km^{2} (3,837.0 sq mi). Its capital is Talca. It had a population of 445,021 inhabitants as per the 2024 Chilean census.

== History ==
A settlement at Talca was first founded in 1692, which had been occupied by the indigenous people, and was abandoned in 1717 due to an uprising of the indigenous groups. On 12 May 1742, it was re-founded as San Agustín de Talca on the order of José Antonio Manso de Velasco, the Royal Governor of Chile. In the nineteenth century, it grew into a major commercial and agricultural center due to the export of wheat from the Maule basin, while wine production developed later. The development was accompanied by the expansion of railway network, and food processing industries. However, the economic growth declined in the early twentieth century, and it was further devastated by an earthquake in 1928, which destroyed much of the region.

The Maule Region was established in 1970. It is divided into four provinces–Talca, Curicó, Linares, and Cauquenes, which are further divided into 30 communes.

== Geography ==
Talca Province is one of the four provinces of the Maule Region in Chile. It covers an area of 9,937.8 km^{2} (3,837.0 sq mi). Almost three-fourth of the land area of the province belongs to the Maule River basin, with the remaining forming part of the Mataquito River basin and the coastal lands.

Talca is located in the central Maule Valley region of Chile, and is the largest wine making region in Chile. The region has clayey and pumice based soils, where red wine grapes are grown. It has a warm Mediterranean climate (Köppen climate classification: Csb) with an average annual temperature of 18.66 °C (65.59 °F). The region receives approximately 8.44 cm (3.32 in) of rainfall annually on average.

== Administration ==
As a province, Talca is a second-level administrative division of Chile, governed by a provincial governor. It is further subdivided into ten communes (comunas)–Talca, San Clemente, Pelarco, Pencahue, Maule, San Rafael, Curepto, Constitución, Empedrado, and Río Claro. The city of Talca serves as the capital of the Maule region and the province.

== Demographics ==
According to the 2024 Chilean census, the province had a population of 445,021 inhabitants. The population consisted of 229,040 females (51.5%) and 215,981 males (48.5%). About 18.3% of the population was below the age of 15 years, 67.4% belonged to the age group of 15–64 years, and 14.2% was aged 65 years or older. The province had an urban population of 352,528 inhabitants (79.2%) and a rural population of 92,493 inhabitants (20.8%). Most of the residents were born in Chile, accounting for 423,486 inhabitants (95.2%). Non-indigenous people formed the majority of the population with 428,606 inhabitants (96.3%), while 16,391 inhabitants (3.7%) identified themselves as belonging to indigenous groups. Roman Catholics formed the largest religious group with 222,678 adherents (61.5%), followed by 70,748 inhabitants (19.5%) indicating no religious affiliation, and Evangelicals or Protestants with 58,599 adherents (16.2%).
