= Constitución, Chile =

Constitución
- City and Commune
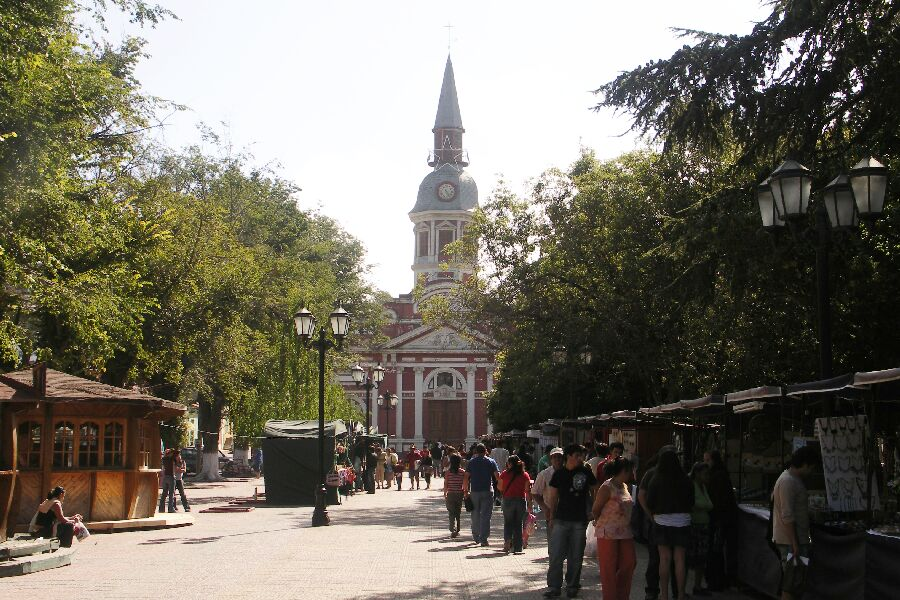

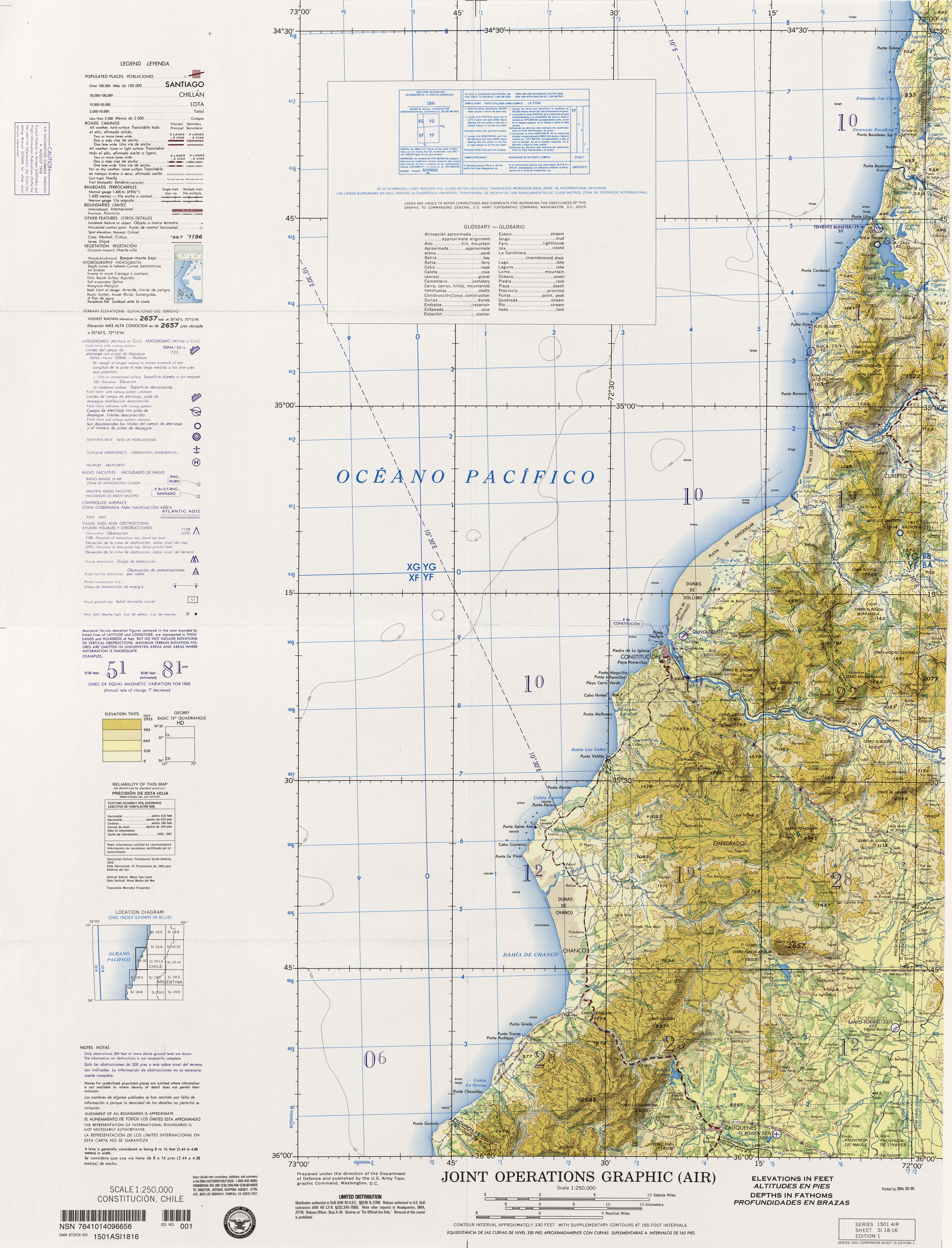
- Coat of arms Map of the Constitución commune in the Maule Region Location in Chile
- Coordinates (city): 35°20′S 72°25′W
- Country: Chile
- Region: Maule
- Province: Talca
- Founded: 1794

Government
  - Type: Municipality
  - Alcalde: Fabián Perez(PR)

Area
  - Total: 1,343.6 km^{2} (518.8 sq mi)
- Elevation: 75 m (246 ft)

Population (2012 Census)
  - Total: 41,207
  - Density: 30.669/km^{2} (79.433/sq mi)
  - Urban: 37,202
  - Rural: 8,879
- Demonym: Maulino/a

Sex
  - Men: 23,389
  - Women: 22,692
- Time zone: UTC-4 (CLT)
  - Summer (DST): UTC-3 (CLST)
- Area code: 56 + 71
- Website: www.constitucion.cl (in Spanish)

Constitución (Spanish pronunciation: [konstituˈsjon]) is a city and commune of Talca Province, Maule Region, Chile. It was historically a popular seaside resort. However, following the growth of the industrial sector (paper and pulp) tourism has since declined. Constitución is a minor port in Chile.

== History ==
Before the arrival of the Spanish, the area that would later be the city of Constitución was inhabited by the Chango people and the Mapuche tribe. Both indigenous groups used the area for fishing and seasonal habitation. When the Spaniards came to the region, the European explorers, and those who followed, used the area as a port for their galleons and merchant ships on their voyages to South American and other Pacific ports.

=== Nueva Bilbao ===
While numerous attempts were made to establish a permanent settlement in the area, Santiago Oñederra was the first successful colonizing pioneer, circa 1791. The founding of the settlement was proposed by Oñederra to the Chilean government, and authorized by Governor Ambrosio O'Higgins in 1794. The settlement was originally named New Bilbao (Spanish: Nueva Bilbao) after the Basque city in Northern Spain.

=== Renaming to Constitución ===
In 1828, New Bilbao was renamed Constitución. On 4 August 1828, Congress approved the designation of Constitución as a major Chilean port. Four days later, Vice President Jose Antonio Pinto signed the decree.

Beginning in 1828, Constitución was designated as part of Maule Region and later included in the Talca Province.

=== 21st century ===
After the devastating 8.8 magnitude earthquake that struck Chile on 27 February 2010, an estimated 350 people died in Constitución from a tsunami. Two weeks before the earthquake, the local people were trained to head for the hills if unable to stand during the tremor, as the likelihood of a tsunami was high. The tsunami was estimated to be 15 m (49 ft) high.

Pedro Muñoz, a fisherman, with his skiff, rescued celebrants of the end of summer from an island on the Maule River, making two trips between the island and the riverbank, before being swamped and killed by the third tsunami wave, on his third trip.

Constitución was damaged by the earthquake and subsequent tsunami. Restoring power in the city in the immediate aftermath was impossible because of damage from the tsunami.

== Geography ==
The town is dominated both economically and geographically by the large cellulose plant of Celulosa Arauco y Constitución. Celulosa Arauco y Constitución has had numerous legal cases with regards to contamination of the local environment. The artificial forests of eucalyptus and pinewood dominate the local landscape. Critics argue that this destroys the natural habitat for local wildlife and leaves the soil acidic and infertile.

== Climate ==
Constitución has a Warm-Summer Mediterranean climate (Csb).

Climate data for Constitución
Month	Jan	Feb	Mar	Apr	May	Jun	Jul	Aug	Sep	Oct	Nov	Dec	Year
Mean daily maximum °C (°F)	22.9 (73.2)	22.2 (72.0)	21.1 (70.0)	18.9 (66.0)	16.4 (61.5)	14.7 (58.5)	14.4 (57.9)	14.9 (58.8)	16.3 (61.3)	17.7 (63.9)	19.9 (67.8)	21.3 (70.3)	18.4 (65.1)
Daily mean °C (°F)	17.6 (63.7)	16.8 (62.2)	15.5 (59.9)	13.5 (56.3)	12.1 (53.8)	10.6 (51.1)	9.9 (49.8)	10.2 (50.4)	11.2 (52.2)	12.9 (55.2)	14.7 (58.5)	16.6 (61.9)	13.5 (56.3)
Mean daily minimum °C (°F)	11.4 (52.5)	11.5 (52.7)	10.3 (50.5)	8.7 (47.7)	8.1 (46.6)	6.9 (44.4)	6.1 (43.0)	6.2 (43.2)	7.1 (44.8)	8.2 (46.8)	9.9 (49.8)	11.1 (52.0)	8.8 (47.8)
Average precipitation mm (inches)	7.8 (0.31)	7.8 (0.31)	16.0 (0.63)	51.6 (2.03)	162.0 (6.38)	205.0 (8.07)	174.5 (6.87)	124.4 (4.90)	69.6 (2.74)	36.6 (1.44)	21.6 (0.85)	17.6 (0.69)	894.5 (35.22)
Source: Meteorología Interactiva

== Demographics ==
According to the 2002 census of the National Statistics Institute, Constitución spans an area of 1,343.6 km^{2} (519 sq mi) and has 46,081 inhabitants (23,389 men and 22,692 women). Of these, 37,202 (80.7%) lived in urban areas and 8,879 (19.3%) in rural areas. The population grew by 14.2% (5,741 persons) between the 1992 and 2002 censuses.

== Administration ==
As a commune, Constitución is a third-level administrative division of Chile administered by a municipal council, headed by an alcalde (mayor) who is directly elected every four years. In 2008-2012 the alcalde was Hugo Tilleria Torres, who was replaced by Carlos Valenzuela Gajardo.

Within the electoral divisions of Chile, Constitución is represented in the Chamber of Deputies by Pablo Lorenzini (PDC) and Pedro Pablo Alvarez-Salamanca (UDI) as part of the 38th electoral district, together with Curepto, Empedrado, Pencahue, Maule, San Clemente, Pelarco, Río Claro and San Rafael. The commune is represented in the Senate by Juan Antonio Coloma Correa (UDI) and Andrés Zaldívar Larraín (PDC) as part of the 10th senatorial constituency (Maule-North).

Celulosa Arauco y Constitución actively funds social and economic regeneration projects in constitucion, providing much needed funding for the municipality. Critics argue this dependence prevents the administration from being able to question issues regarding pollution with Arauco.

== Economy ==
The Maule region of which Constitucion is part has the second lowest income per capita in Chile, with only Aysen receiving less income per capita. The residents of Maule receive per capita less than 25% of the national average income and around 10% of the income per capita in Antofagasta. Illiteracy is currently 7% in Maule versus the 3% country wide average. The main employment sources are the primary sectors, fishing, farming, forestry and low level artesanal production.

One of the city's main employers is Celulosa Arauco y Constitución, a wood pulp, engineered wood, and forestry company. Until his 2007 death, the company was owned and controlled by Italian-born Santiago billionaire Anacleto Angelini and has since been taken over by his nephew, Roberto Angelini Rossi, current chairman of Angelini's holding company, AntarChile. Despite lawsuits and protests, AntarChile was given permission in 2006 to discharge pollutants from the plant into the sea. An earthquake and tsunami in 2010 caused the plant's closure for three months due to power outages and damage.

== Transportation ==
Railway expansion first came to the Maule Region in mid-1889 when rail-line construction began by the North and South American Company. Service began on August 13, 1892, when lines were opened between Talca and Curtiduría. The next railway portion to be completed was to Pichamán on November 1, 1894. Rails were laid along the northern bank of the Maule River, opposite Constitución. Constitución's first station was established in 1902. and remained in use until 1915 when a new station was constructed.

Constitución is home for the end-of-the-line station of the Ramal de Maule also known as the Ramal Talca-Constitución, a rural train that runs an 80 kilometer (50 mile) rail line from Talca. The scenic train affords views of the Andean foothills as well as the Pacific Ocean. Currently, the Ramal is facing shutdown due to lack of use. From the late 1800s on, rail travel had been Chile's main form of transportation. In the 21st century, however, Chileans have largely changed their transportation preference to buses and private cars. As a result of this switch, passenger rail travel has become obsolete.

The city is served by Quivolgo International Airport.
