= AntarChile =

AntarChile S.A.
- Type: Sociedad Anónima
- Traded as: BCS: ANTARCHILE
- Industry: Conglomerate
- Founded: 2003
- Headquarters: Santiago, Chile
- Key people: Roberto Angelini Rossi, (Chairman); Jorge Andueza Fouque, (CEO)
- Products: Forestry; Fuel; Fishing; Other Investments
- Revenue: ▲US$ 22.7 billion (2012)
- Net income: ▼US$ 232.5 million (2012)
- Number of employees: 44,000
- Subsidiaries: Empresas Copec
- Website: www.antarchile.cl

AntarChile is the main holding company of the Angelini Group of Companies, one of the largest conglomerates in South America. This company has major investments in various sectors including industrial, forestry, fisheries and energy.

The origins of AntarChile date back to the early 1950s, when arriving in Chile from Italy, brothers Gino and Anacleto Angelini began various businesses ventures. In 1956, the brothers set in motion Pesquera Eperva Company Ltd. in the Northern Zone, which marked the formation of a large industrial fishing complex that is now a pillar in the regional economy and a recognized world leader in its field.

In 1986, through Pesquera Eperva Company Ltd. and Pesquera Indo SA Company, they took control of Petroleos de Chile SA, which is today Copec

In 1989, the companies split the operational management and investment, creating societies EMPD Investment SA Indomitable and Investment SA and through them, they retained control of the company Petroleos de Chile SA. Later, in 1994 these companies merged with other investment companies Angelini Group Companies, forming AntarChile.

The holding company's interests include forest enterprises, manufacture of timber, fuel distribution, production and distribution of energy, shipping and fisheries.
