= Manuel Larraín Errázuriz =

Chilean clergyman and bishop

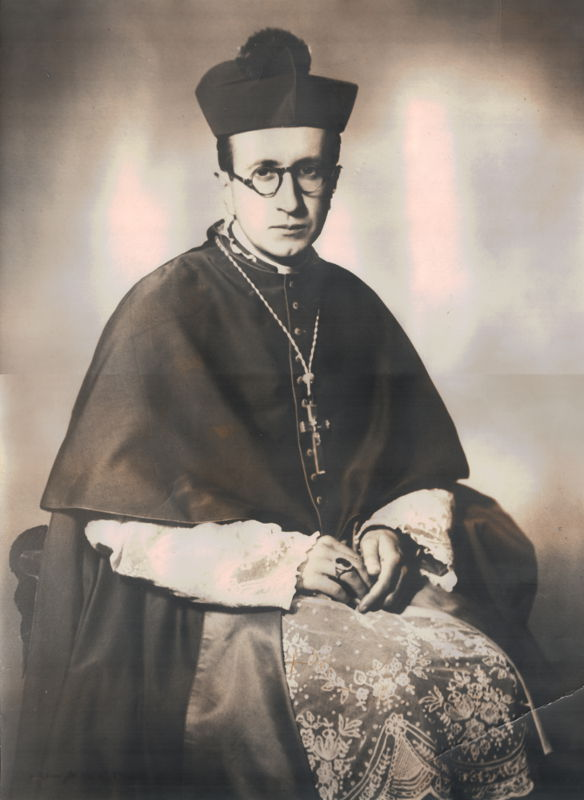
Manuel Larraín Errázuriz

Manuel Larraín Errázuriz (born 1900 in Santiago) was a Chilean clergyman and bishop for the Roman Catholic Diocese of Talca. He was ordained in 1927. He was appointed bishop in 1938. He died in 1966.
