= Empresas Copec =

Chilean energy and forestry company

Empresas Copec S.A.
- Company type: Sociedad Anónima
- Traded as: BCS: COPEC
- Industry: Energy
- Founded: 1934
- Headquarters: Santiago, Chile
- Key people: Roberto Angelini Rossi, (Chairman); Eduardo Navarro Beltrán, (CEO)
- Products: Forestry; Fuel; Fishing; Other Investments
- Revenue: ▲US$22.7 billion (2012)
- Net income: ▼US$409.6 million (2012)
- Number of employees: 8,644
- Parent: AntarChile
- Subsidiaries: Celulosa Arauco y Constitución, MAPCO Express (USA), Metrogas, among others.
- Website: www.ec.cl

Empresas Copec is a Chilean energy and forestry company with a chain of gas stations throughout Chile.

Copec was founded in 1934. The first president of Copec, Pedro Aguirre Cerda, later became president of Chile. Today Roberto Angelini Rossi is the president of Copec.

Copec expanded its activities to the sale of tires and accessories, machinery, and vehicles in 1941. It participated in the formation of Petroleum Navigation Company (SONAP 1943), National Society Pipeline (SONACOL, 1956).

During the 1970s Copec extended its activities through the purchase of Celulosa Arauco, Forestal Arauco and Cellulose Constitution later forming one of its main subsidiaries Celulosa Arauco y Constitución.

Copec founded the Chilean Homeware company Abcdin in 1950.

In 2016, Copec entered the United States by acquiring MAPCO Express from Delek US. It was announced in April 2023 that COPEC had sold Mapco Express to the American company Majors Group and the Canadian company Couche-Tard.
