= Maule, Chile =

Maule
- Town and Commune
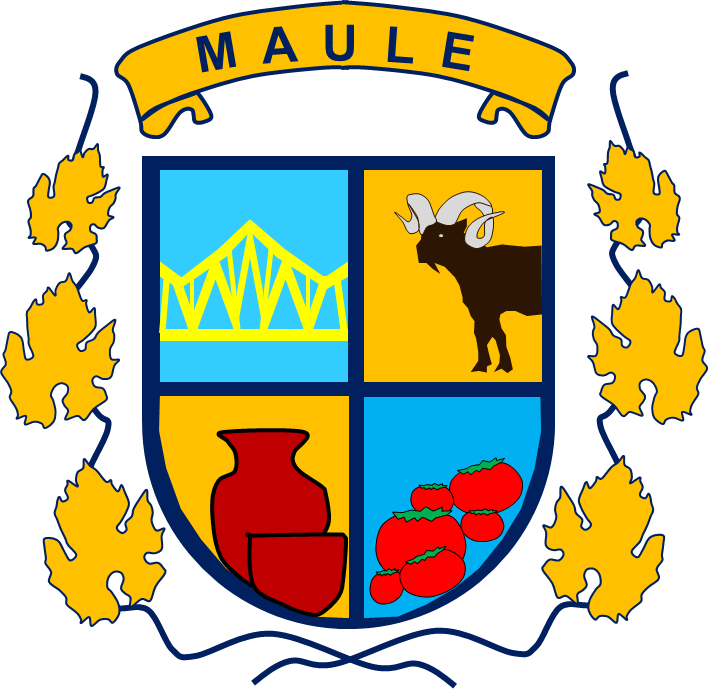
- Coat of arms Location of the Maule commune in the Maule Region Location in Chile
- Coordinates (town): 35°32′S 71°42′W
- Country: Chile
- Region: Maule
- Province: Talca
- Peumo: 30 December 1927

Government
  - Type: Municipality
  - Alcalde: Pablo Luna Amigo

Area
  - Total: 238.2 km^{2} (92.0 sq mi)
- Elevation: 107 m (351 ft)

Population (2012 Census)
  - Total: 38,270
  - Density: 160.7/km^{2} (416.1/sq mi)
  - Urban: 6,739
  - Rural: 10,098
- Demonym: Maulino

Sex
  - Men: 8,691
  - Women: 8,146
- Time zone: UTC-4 (CLT)
  - Summer (DST): UTC-3 (CLST)
- Area code: 56 + 71
- Website: Municipality of Maule

Maule is a town and commune in Talca Province in central Chile's Maule Region. It takes its name from the Mapudungun words for "valley" (mau) and "rainy" (len).

== Geography ==
The town of Maule lies near the Maule River. The Maule commune spans an area of 238.2 km^{2} (92 sq mi).

== History ==
Since the time of the Incas, the area that makes up the Maule commune today has been a place of strategic and communicative value due to its close proximity to the river of the same name. In this area, the city of Talca was founded as the Villa de San Agustín about 12 km (7 mi) to the north. In the mid 18th century, nearby Duao was founded as the communal seat. During the 19th century, many people were attracted to the mining activity in the area of El Chavito and settled here looking for a better future. They founded various towns, principally Peumo. Toward the west was the old river port of Linares de Perales which lies between the confluence of the Maule and Claro rivers, where barges transported agricultural products to their destination of Constitución.

On 30 December 1927, then-president Carlos Ibáñez del Campo Mientras renamed Peumo to Maule and established the commune with Supreme Decree 8583. At this time, the communal seat was moved from Duao to Maule where it remains to this day. In 1928, a year after its founding, the commune of Maule, which was at one time owned by the Lailhacar brothers, belonged to the municipality of Duao but was renamed to the municipality of Maule. Until 1927, the ancient city of Duao had been led by seven alcaldes. The current commune of Maule, since its first mayor Carlos Garcena to its present mayor, has been led by 39 alcaldes.

== Economy ==
The economy of the commune is based primary on agriculture and stockbreeding. The goldmine El Chavito can be found on the riverbank where El Águila hill, property of the Silva Neale family, was the area's main gold deposit in the 19th century.

The vineyard and garden La Vertientes (meaning "The Slopes") has become the premiere industrial flower garden that exports flowers and seeds to Europe, particularly to Germany. Their owner, Carlos Steinhoff von Bohlen, married Amalia Silva Neale and began work in the 1950s, becoming a pioneer in the commune in this non-traditional export trade. In the Maule Region, principle exports are wine and fruits such as apples and grapes.

== Demographics ==
According to data from the 2002 Census of Population and Housing, Maule had 16,837 inhabitants; of these, 6,739 (40.0%) lived in urban areas and 10,098 (60.0%) in rural areas. At that time, there were 8,691 men and 8,146 women. The population grew 22.3% (3,068 persons) between the 1992 and 2002 censuses. The demonym for a person from Maule is Maulino for a man or Maulina for a woman.

== Administration ==
As a commune, Maule is a third-level administrative division of Chile administered by a municipal council, headed by an alcalde who is directly elected every four years. The 2008-2012 alcalde is Iván Riveros Cerda (ILE), and his council members are:

- Luis Vasquez Galvez (UDI)
- Sergio Jelvez Medina (PS)
- Pablo Opazo Encina (DC)
- Vladimir Albornoz Espina (ILD)
- Carlos Ovalle Rojas (ILF)
- Juan Gutierrez Moreno (RN)

Within the electoral divisions of Chile, Maule is represented in the Chamber of Deputies by Pablo Lorenzini (PDC) and Pedro Pablo Alvarez-Salamanca (UDI) as part of the 38th electoral district, together with Curepto, Constitución, Empedrado, Pencahue, San Clemente, Pelarco, Río Claro and San Rafael. The commune is represented in the Senate by Juan Antonio Coloma Correa (UDI) and Andrés Zaldívar Larraín (PDC) as part of the 10th senatorial constituency (Maule-North).
