= Pelarco =

- Town and Commune
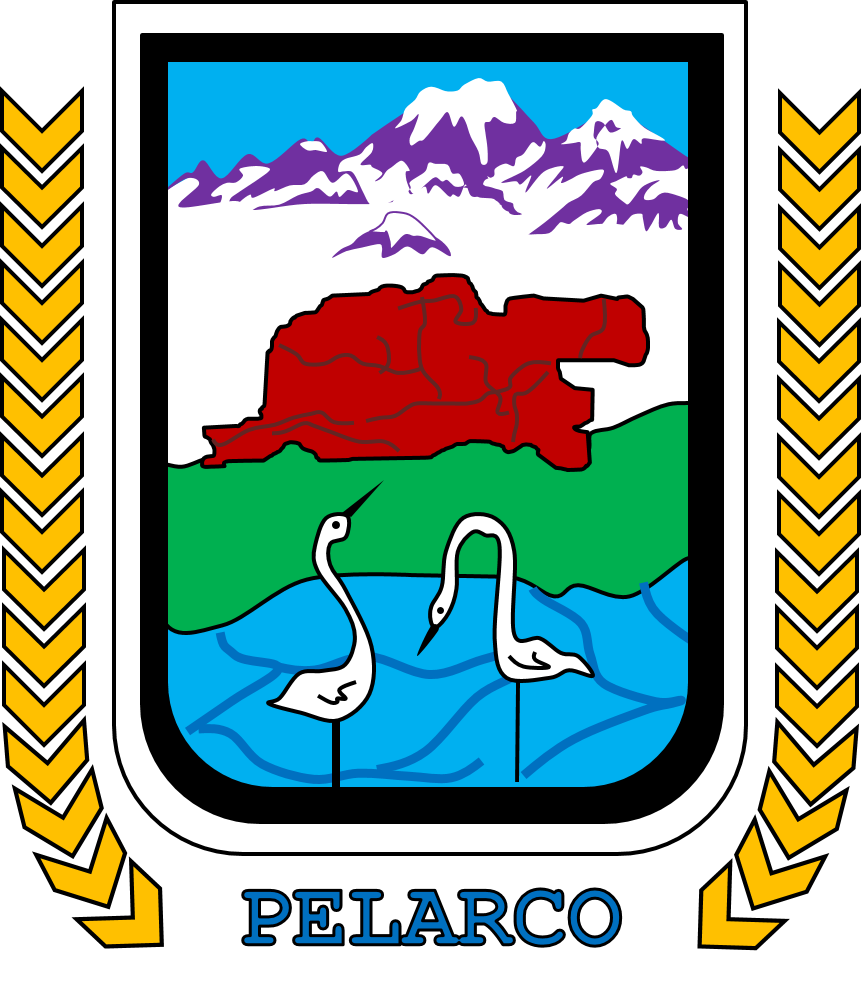
- Coat of arms Location of the Pelarco commune in the Maule Region Location in Chile
- Coordinates: 35°23′S 71°27′W
- Country: Chile
- Region: Maule
- Province: Talca

Government
  - Type: Municipality
  - Alcalde: Alfredo Pérez Leiva (Ind.)

Area
  - Total: 331.5 km^{2} (128.0 sq mi)
- Elevation: 136 m (446 ft)

Population (2012 Census)
  - Total: 7,632
  - Density: 23.02/km^{2} (59.63/sq mi)
  - Urban: 1,822
  - Rural: 5,444

Sex
  - Men: 3714
  - Women: 3552
- Time zone: UTC-4 (CLT)
  - Summer (DST): UTC-3 (CLST)
- Area code: (+56) 71
- Website: www.municipalidaddepelarco.cl

Pelarco is a town and commune in Talca Province, Maule Region of Chile. The commune spans an area of 331.5 km^{2} (128 sq mi).

== Demographics ==
According to data from the 2002 Census of Population and Housing, Pelarco had 7,266 inhabitants; of these, 1,822 (25.1%) lived in urban areas and 5,444 (74.9%) in rural areas. At that time, there were 3,714 men and 3,552 women. The population fell 5.0% (382 persons) between the 1992 and 2002 censuses.

== Administration ==
As a commune, Pelarco is a third-level administrative division of Chile administered by a municipal council, headed by an alcalde who is directly elected every four years. The 2008-2012 alcalde is Alfredo Pérez Leiva (Ind.).

Within the electoral divisions of Chile, Pelarco is represented in the Chamber of Deputies by Pablo Lorenzini (PDC) and Pedro Pablo Alvarez-Salamanca (UDI) as part of the 38th electoral district, together with Curepto, Constitución, Empedrado, Pencahue, Maule, San Clemente, Río Claro and San Rafael. The commune is represented in the Senate by Juan Antonio Coloma Correa (UDI) and Andrés Zaldívar Larraín (PDC) as part of the 10th senatorial constituency (Maule-North).
