= San Clemente, Chile =

San Clemente
- City and Commune
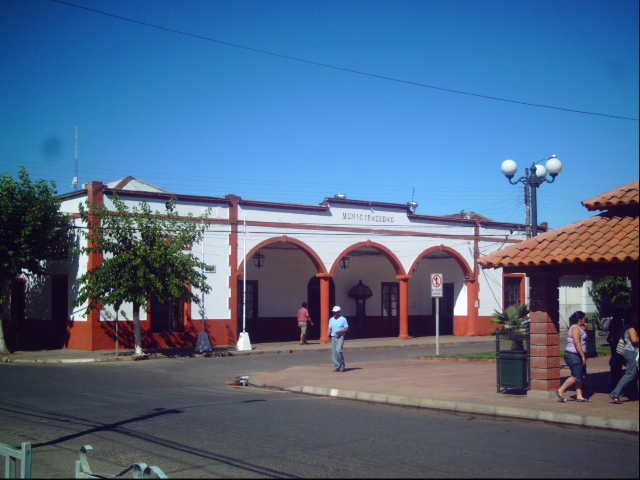
- San Clemente

- Location of the San Clemente commune in the Maule Region Location in Chile
- Coordinates (city): 35°33′S 71°29′W
- Country: Chile
- Region: Maule
- Province: Talca

Government
  - Type: Municipality
  - Alcalde: Oscar Galvez Rebolledo (RN)

Area
  - Total: 4,503.5 km^{2} (1,738.8 sq mi)
- Elevation: 200 m (660 ft)

Population (2012 Census)
  - Total: 39,538
  - Density: 8.7794/km^{2} (22.739/sq mi)
  - Urban: 13,398
  - Rural: 23,863

Sex
  - Men: 18,988
  - Women: 18,273
- Time zone: UTC-4 (CLT)
  - Summer (DST): UTC-3 (CLST)
- Area code: 56 + 71
- Website: Municipality of San Clemente

San Clemente is a city and commune administered by the municipality of San Clemente, located in the Talca Province of Chile's Maule Region.

== Demographics ==
According to the 2002 census of the National Statistics Institute, San Clemente spans an area of 4,503.5 km^{2} (1,739 sq mi) and has 37,261 inhabitants (18,988 men and 18,273 women). Of these, 13,398 (36%) lived in urban areas and 23,863 (64%) in rural areas. The population grew by 2.3% (847 persons) between the 1992 and 2002 censuses.

== Administration ==
As a commune, San Clemente is a third-level administrative division of Chile administered by a municipal council, headed by an alcalde who is directly elected every four years. The 2008–2012 alcalde is Oscar Galvez Rebolledo (RN).

Within the electoral divisions of Chile, San Clemente is represented in the Chamber of Deputies by Pablo Lorenzini (PDC) and Pedro Pablo Alvarez-Salamanca (UDI) as part of the 38th electoral district, together with Curepto, Constitución, Empedrado, Pencahue, Maule, Pelarco, Río Claro and San Rafael. The commune is represented in the Senate by Juan Antonio Coloma Correa (UDI) and Andrés Zaldívar Larraín (PDC) as part of the 10th senatorial constituency (Maule-North).

== Climate ==
Climate data for Armerillo - Endesa, elevation 450 m (1,480 ft)
Month	Jan	Feb	Mar	Apr	May	Jun	Jul	Aug	Sep	Oct	Nov	Dec	Year
Mean daily maximum °C (°F)	28.2 (82.8)	26.8 (80.2)	23.7 (74.7)	20.7 (69.3)	16.5 (61.7)	12.4 (54.3)	12.6 (54.7)	14.7 (58.5)	16.2 (61.2)	18.6 (65.5)	23.2 (73.8)	26.4 (79.5)	20.0 (68.0)
Daily mean °C (°F)	21.0 (69.8)	19.6 (67.3)	17.3 (63.1)	14.1 (57.4)	11.2 (52.2)	8.1 (46.6)	7.9 (46.2)	8.8 (47.8)	10.5 (50.9)	13.2 (55.8)	16.8 (62.2)	19.1 (66.4)	14.0 (57.1)
Mean daily minimum °C (°F)	13.8 (56.8)	13.0 (55.4)	11.1 (52.0)	9.0 (48.2)	7.5 (45.5)	4.9 (40.8)	4.4 (39.9)	5.6 (42.1)	6.3 (43.3)	7.7 (45.9)	10.3 (50.5)	12.8 (55.0)	8.9 (47.9)
Average precipitation mm (inches)	21.6 (0.85)	21.2 (0.83)	43.5 (1.71)	138.7 (5.46)	445.8 (17.55)	567.8 (22.35)	467.9 (18.42)	352.3 (13.87)	223.8 (8.81)	127.6 (5.02)	84.2 (3.31)	47.7 (1.88)	2,542.1 (100.06)
Source: Meteorología Interactiva
