= Empedrado, Chile =

Empedrado
- Town and Commune
- Map of Empedrado commune in the Maule Region Location in Chile
- Coordinates (city): 35°36′S 72°17′W
- Country: Chile
- Region: Maule
- Province: Talca

Government
  - Type: Municipality
  - Alcalde: Gonzalo Tejos Perez

Area
  - Total: 564.9 km^{2} (218.1 sq mi)
- Elevation: 451 m (1,480 ft)

Population (2012 Census)
  - Total: 4,253
  - Density: 7.529/km^{2} (19.50/sq mi)
  - Urban: 2,499
  - Rural: 1,726

Sex
  - Men: 2,222
  - Women: 2,003
- Time zone: UTC-4 (CLT)
  - Summer (DST): UTC-3 (CLST)
- Area code: 56 + 71
- Website: Municipality of Empedrado

Empedrado (Spanish pronunciation: [empeˈðɾaðo]) is a town and commune in the Talca Province of Chile's Maule Region.

== Demographics ==
According to the 2002 census of the National Statistics Institute, Empedrado spans an area of 564.9 km^{2} (218 sq mi) and has 4,225 inhabitants (2,222 men and 2,003 women). Of these, 2,499 (59.1%) lived in urban areas and 1,726 (40.9%) in rural areas. The population fell by 7.2% (329 persons) between the 1992 and 2002 censuses.

== Administration ==
As a commune, Empedrado is a third-level administrative division of Chile administered by a municipal council, headed by an alcalde who is directly elected every four years. The 2008-2012 alcalde is Gonzalo Tejos Perez.

Within the electoral divisions of Chile, Empedrado is represented in the Chamber of Deputies by Pablo Lorenzini (PDC) and Pedro Pablo Alvarez-Salamanca (UDI) as part of the 38th electoral district, together with Curepto, Constitución, Pencahue, Maule, San Clemente, Pelarco, Río Claro and San Rafael. The commune is represented in the Senate by Juan Antonio Coloma Correa (UDI) and Andrés Zaldívar Larraín (PDC) as part of the 10th senatorial constituency (Maule-North).
