= San Rafael, Chile =

San Rafael
- Town and Commune
- Coat of arms Map of the San Rafael commune in the Maule Region Location in Chile
- Coordinates (town): 35°19′S 71°32′W
- Country: Chile
- Region: Maule
- Province: Talca

Government
  - Type: Municipality
  - Alcaldesa: CLAUDIA ALEJANDRA DIAZ BRAVO

Area
  - Total: 263.5 km^{2} (101.7 sq mi)
- Elevation: 127 m (417 ft)

Population (2012 Census)
  - Total: 7,964
  - Density: 30.22/km^{2} (78.28/sq mi)
  - Urban: 3,482
  - Rural: 4,192

Sex
  - Men: 3,903
  - Women: 3,771
- Time zone: UTC-4 (CLT)
  - Summer (DST): UTC-3 (CLST)
- Area code: 56 + 71
- Website: Municipality of San Rafael

San Rafael is a town and commune of the Talca Province in the Maule Region of Chile. The town serves as the communal capital.

== Demographics ==
According to the 2002 census of the National Statistics Institute, San Rafael spans an area of 263.5 km^{2} (102 sq mi) and has 7,674 inhabitants (3,903 men and 3,771 women). Of these, 3,482 (45.4%) lived in urban areas and 4,192 (54.6%) in rural areas. The population grew by 6.5% (465 persons) between the 1992 and 2002 censuses.

== Administration ==
As a commune, San Rafael is a third-level administrative division of Chile administered by a municipal council, headed by an alcalde who is directly elected every four years. The 2008-2012 alcaldesa is Claudia Alejandra Diaz Bravo. (UDI)

Within the electoral divisions of Chile, San Rafael is represented in the Chamber of Deputies by Pablo Lorenzini (PDC) and Pedro Pablo Alvarez-Salamanca (UDI) as part of the 38th electoral district, together with Curepto, Constitución, Empedrado, Pencahue, Maule, San Clemente, Pelarco and Río Claro. The commune is represented in the Senate by Juan Antonio Coloma Correa (UDI) and Andrés Zaldívar Larraín (PDC) as part of the 10th senatorial constituency (Maule-North).
