= Río Claro =

- Commune
- Location of the Río Claro commune in the Maule Region Location in Chile
- Coordinates (city): 35°17′S 71°16′W
- Country: Chile
- Region: Maule
- Province: Talca

Government
  - Type: Municipality
  - Alcalde: Claudio Guajardo Oyarce

Area
  - Total: 430.5 km^{2} (166.2 sq mi)
- Elevation: 273 m (896 ft)

Population (2012 Census)
  - Total: 12,844
  - Density: 29.84/km^{2} (77.27/sq mi)
  - Urban: 2,651
  - Rural: 10,047

Sex
  - Men: 6,716
  - Women: 5,982
- Time zone: UTC-4 (CLT)
  - Summer (DST): UTC-3 (CLST)
- Area code: 56 + 71
- Website: Municipality of Río Claro

Río Claro is a commune of the Talca Province in Chile's Maule Region. The municipal seat is the town of Cumpeo.

== Demographics ==
According to the 2002 census of the National Statistics Institute, Río Claro spans an area of 430.5 km^{2} (166 sq mi) and has 12,698 inhabitants (6,716 men and 5,982 women). Of these, 2,651 (20.9%) lived in urban areas and 10,047 (79.1%) in rural areas. The population grew by 0.8% (107 persons) between the 1992 and 2002 censuses.

== Administration ==
As a commune, Río Claro is a third-level administrative division of Chile administered by a municipal council, headed by an alcalde who is directly elected every four years. The 2008-2012 alcalde is Claudio Guajardo Oyarce.

Within the electoral divisions of Chile, Río Claro is represented in the Chamber of Deputies by Pablo Lorenzini (PDC) and Pedro Pablo Alvarez-Salamanca (UDI) as part of the 38th electoral district, together with Curepto, Constitución, Empedrado, Pencahue, Maule, San Clemente, Pelarco and San Rafael. The commune is represented in the Senate by Juan Antonio Coloma Correa (UDI) and Andrés Zaldívar Larraín (PDC) as part of the 10th senatorial constituency (Maule-North).
