= Pencahue =

- Town and Commune
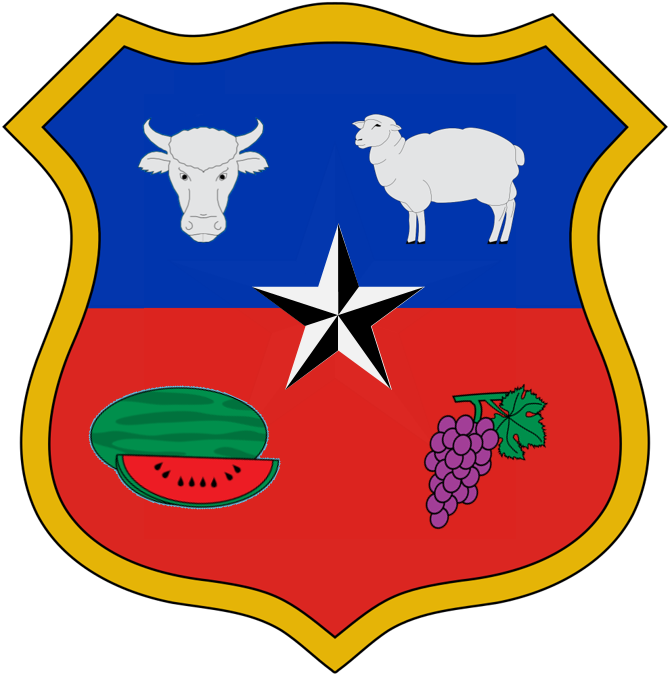
- Coat of arms Location of the Pencahue commune in the Maule Region Location in Chile
- Coordinates (city): 35°24′S 71°49′W
- Country: Chile
- Region: Maule
- Province: Talca

Government
  - Type: Municipality
  - Alcalde: Lucy Lara Leiva (RN)

Area
  - Total: 956.8 km^{2} (369.4 sq mi)
- Elevation: 38 m (125 ft)

Population (2012 Census)
  - Total: 7,924
  - Density: 8.282/km^{2} (21.45/sq mi)
  - Urban: 2,037
  - Rural: 6,278

Sex
  - Men: 4,517
  - Women: 3,798
- Time zone: UTC-4 (CLT)
  - Summer (DST): UTC-3 (CLST)
- Area code: 56 + 71
- Website: Municipality of Pencahue

Pencahue (Spanish pronunciation: [peŋˈkawe]) is a town and commune in Chile, located in Talca Province, in the seventh region of Maule. The commune spans and area of 956.8 km^{2} (369 sq mi).

Also there are another three places called Pencahue, near to San Vicente de Tagua Tagua, Sexta Región, Chile. Their names are: Pencahue Central, Pencahue Abajo (some people call it only Pencahue Bajo) and Plaza de Pencahue.

== Demographics ==
According to data from the 2002 Census of Population and Housing, Pencahue had 8,315 inhabitants; of these, 2,037 (24.5%) lived in urban areas and 6,278 (75.5%) in rural areas. At that time, there were 4,517 men and 3,798 women. The population grew 5.9% (461 persons) between the 1992 and 2002 censuses.

== Administration ==
As a commune, Pencahue is a third-level administrative division of Chile administered by a municipal council, headed by an alcalde who is directly elected every four years. The 2008-2012/2012-2016 alcalde is Lucy Lara Leiva (RN).

Within the electoral divisions of Chile, Pencahue is represented in the Chamber of Deputies by Pablo Lorenzini (PDC) and Pedro Pablo Alvarez-Salamanca (UDI) as part of the 38th electoral district, together with Curepto, Constitución, Empedrado, Maule, San Clemente, Pelarco, Río Claro and San Rafael. The commune is represented in the Senate by Juan Antonio Coloma Correa (UDI) and Andrés Zaldívar Larraín (PDC) as part of the 10th senatorial constituency (Maule-North).
