= Maule Region =

Region of Chile

Maule Region Región del Maule
- Region
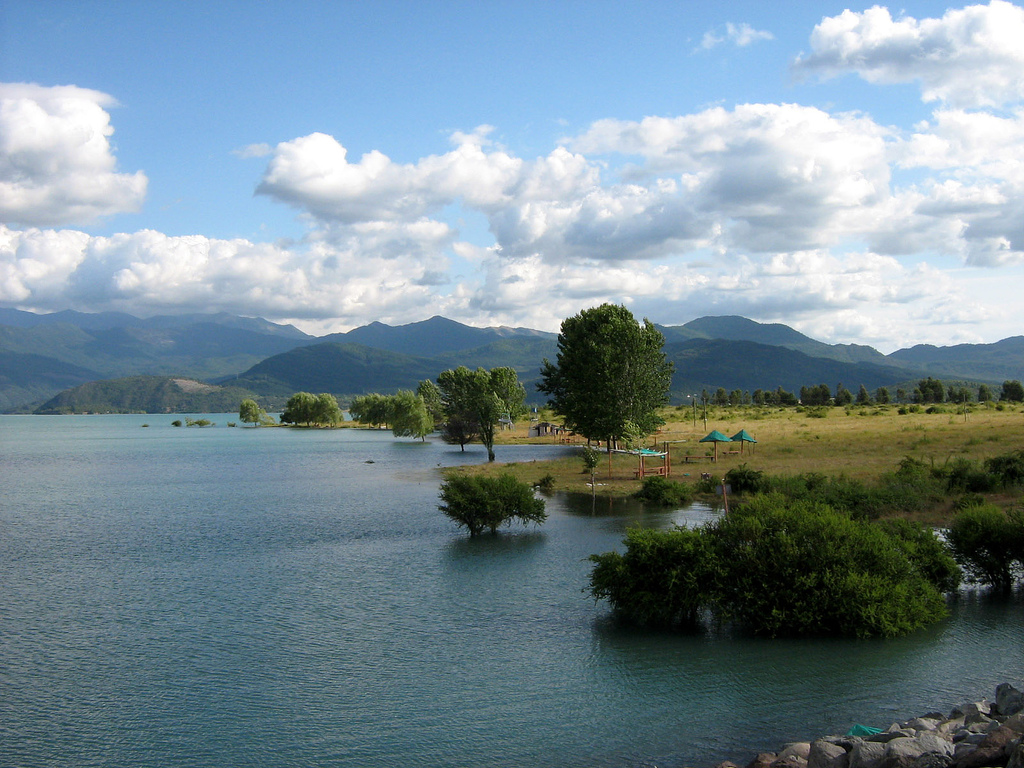
- Colbún Lake

- Flag Seal Coat of arms

- Map of Maule Region
- Coordinates: 35°26′S 71°40′W
- Country: Chile
- Capital: Talca
- Provinces: Curicó, Talca, Linares, Cauquenes

Government
  - Governor: Pedro Álvarez-Salamanca (UDI)
  - Presidential delegate: Juan Eduardo Prieto (Ind.)

Area
  - Total: 30,296.1 km^{2} (11,697.4 sq mi)
  - Rank: 9
- Lowest elevation: 0 m (0 ft)

Population (2024 census)
  - Total: 1,123,008
  - Rank: 4
  - Density: 37.0677/km^{2} (96.0050/sq mi)

GDP (PPP)
  - Total: $10.998 billion (2014)
  - Per capita: $10,620 (2014)
- ISO 3166 code: CL-ML
- HDI (2022): 0.798 high
- Website: Official website (in Spanish)

The Maule Region (Spanish: Región del Maule, pronounced [ˈmawle]) is one of Chile's 16 first order administrative divisions. Its capital is Talca. The region derives its name from the Maule River which, running westward from the Andes, bisects the region and spans a basin of about 20,600 km^{2}. The Maule river marked the southern limits of the Inca Empire.

== Geography ==
The region covers an area of 30,296 km^{2} (11,697 sq mi) and is bordered on the west by the Pacific Ocean; on the east by the Argentina; on the north by the O'Higgins Region, and on the south by the Ñuble Region.

From west to east, the region extends from the Pacific coast over the Chilean Coast Range (Cordillera de la Costa) to include a portion of the Chilean Central Valley, and the Andes mountains from the foothills to the crest.

There are a number of flora and fauna species present in Maule. For example, the endangered Chilean wine palm (Jubaea chilensis) is found in a very limited distribution that includes the Maule Region. The limited-range and endangered trees Nothofagus alessandrii and Gomortega keule are also found in the region.

Protected areas in the region include Altos de Lircay National Reserve, Federico Albert National Reserve, Laguna Torca National Reserve, Los Bellotos del Melado National Reserve, Los Queules National Reserve, Los Ruiles National Reserve, and Radal Siete Tazas National Park.

== Demography ==
According to the 2024 census, the population of the region was 1,123,008. With one third of its population living in rural areas, Maule has a greater proportion of rural inhabitants than any other region of Chile. Its most populated city is the regional capital, Talca, with 232,131 inhabitants, followed by Curicó (159,968) and Linares (96,744). Other important cities are: San Javier (49,559), Molina (48,949), San Clemente (47,380), Constitución (47,004), Parral (45,323) and Cauquenes (42,798).

=== Population density ===
The average density of the Maule Region is 37.07 inhabitants per km^{2}, with less dense areas towards the mountains, and dense areas in the central valley.

=== Composition by age and sex ===
According to the composition pyramid of the population of the Region, those younger than fifteen years old are becoming greater in number than the adult population. The annual growth rate of the population of the Maule Region is 1.06%; this comparatively low figure arises from the low birth rate in the Region. The average life expectancy in the Region is 76.3 years.

== Economy ==
Forestry and agriculture, led by wine grape plantations, are the main economic activities. The Maule region is Chile's leading wine-making region, producing 50% of all the country's fine export wines, and a number of the largest vineyards are located here. Owing to its high concentration of vineyards, the Curicó Valley, which means "black water" in Mapudungun, is considered the core of Chile's wine industry. Wine-making is a traditional activity, some vineyards dating back to 1830. The increased wine-growing area is matched by the development of the industry's infrastructure, technology, and equipment.

In addition to wine, two export-oriented agricultural items have emerged dynamically: fruit, vegetables and flowers.

Electricity, gas and water are the second most important economic activity. The Maule River feeds five hydroelectric power plants, including the Colbún-Machicura complex.

== Political divisions ==
The four provinces of the Maule Region are divided into 30 communes.

Political and administrative divisions of Maule Region, Chile
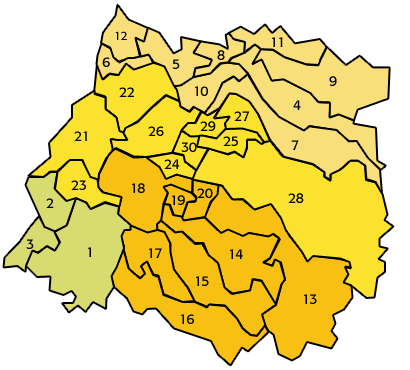

Province	Area in km^{2}	Population	Capital	Communes
Cauquenes	3,027	57,088	Cauquenes	1 Cauquenes; 2 Chanco; 3 Pelluhue
Curicó	7,281	244,053	Curicó	4 Curicó; 5 Hualañé; 6 Licantén; 7 Molina; 8 Rauco; 9 Romeral; 10 Sagrada Familia; 11 Teno; 12 Vichuquén
Linares	10,050	253,990	Linares	13 Colbún; 14 Linares; 15 Longaví; 16 Parral; 17 Retiro; 18 San Javier de Loncomilla; 19 Villa Alegre; 20 Yerbas Buenas
Talca	9,961	352,966	Talca	21 Constitución; 22 Curepto; 23 Empedrado; 24 Maule; 25 Pelarco; 26 Pencahue; 27 Río Claro; 28 San Clemente; 29 San Rafael; 30 Talca

== History ==
=== Heritage ===
The Maule Region has produced a great number of famous men and women, in particular writers and poets but also, statesmen and presidents, scientists and naturalists, churchmen, musicians and folklorists, journalists and historians. Thus, the Maule river, the long and wide artery that runs through the region, has been considered Chile's literary river par excellence. Many novels and short stories have had the river as their main background or protagonist. Several anthologies, author's dictionaries and essays have given their account of the cultural wealth of the region.

The region boasts of many small towns and villages with well-preserved colonial rural architecture, both in the religious as well as the civil fields. The Talca and Linares dioceses (the two Roman Catholic dioceses in the Maule region) have several parish churches of particular beauty and architectural and historic value.

=== 27 February 2010 earthquake and aftermath ===
At 03:34 local time (06:34 UTC), an 8.8 magnitude earthquake occurred off the Maule coast approximately 11 km (7 mi) southwest of Curanipe and 100 km (62 mi) north-northeast of Chile's second largest city, Concepción. The earthquake lasted nearly four minutes, severely affected the region through its action and the resultant tsunami. Cauquenes was damaged by the earthquake. Constitución was damaged by the earthquake and subsequent tsunami. Restoring power in both cities in the immediate aftermath was impossible because of damage from the tsunami.

== Politics ==
=== Regional Intendant (Intendente) ===
- Rodrigo Galilea Vial

=== Provincial Governors ===
- Curicó Province: Gloria Rojas
- Talca Province: María Elena Villagrán
- Linares Province: Luis Suazo
- Cauquenes Province: María Angélica Sáez

=== Members of Parliament (Diputados) ===
The Maule Region is divided into five parliamentary districts. Each one of these returns two members of parliament or deputies.

The table shows the district number, the municipalities encompassed in each district and the names (and party) of the respective members of parliament.

District number	Municipalities encompassed in the district	Members of Parliament (Political party)
36	Curicó, Teno, Romeral, Molina, Sagrada Familia, Hualañé, Licantén, Vichuquén, Rauco	Roberto León (PDC), Celso Morales (UDI)
37	Talca	Germán Verdugo (RN), Sergio Aguiló (PS)
38	Curepto, Constitución, Empedrado, Pencahue, Maule, San Clemente, Pelarco, Río Claro, San Rafael	Pablo Lorenzini (PDC), Pedro Pablo Álvarez-Salamanca (RN)
39	Linares, Colbún, San Javier, Villa Alegre, Yerbas Buenas	Romilio Gutiérrez (UDI), Jorge Tarud (PPD)
40	Longaví, Retiro, Parral, Cauquenes, Pelluhue, Chanco	Guillermo Ceroni (PPD), Ignacio Urrutia (UDI)

=== Senators (Senadores) ===
The Maule Region is divided into two senatorial circumscriptions. One (Circumscription North) is composed of the provinces of Curicó and Talca and the other by the provinces of Linares and Cauquenes. Thus, senatorial circumscription North encompasses parliamentary districts 36, 37 and 38, and senatorial circumscription South encompasses parliamentary districts 39 and 40. Each circumscription elects two senators.

The table shows the circumscription name, the municipalities encompassed in each district and the names (and party) of the respective senators.

Circumscription number and name	Municipalities encompassed in the Circumscription	Members of Parliament (Political party)
(10) Región del Maule (Norte)	Curicó, Teno, Romeral, Molina, Sagrada Familia, Hualañé, Licantén, Vichuquén, Rauco, Talca, Curepto, Constitución, Empedrado, Pencahue, Maule, San Clemente, Pelarco, Río Claro, San Rafael	Andrés Zaldívar (PDC), Juan Antonio Coloma Correa (UDI)
(11) Región del Maule (Sur)	Linares, Colbún, San Javier, Villa Alegre, Yerbas Buenas, Longaví, Retiro, Parral, Cauquenes, Pelluhue, Chanco	Ximena Rincón (PDC), Hernán Larraín (UDI)

== Gallery ==
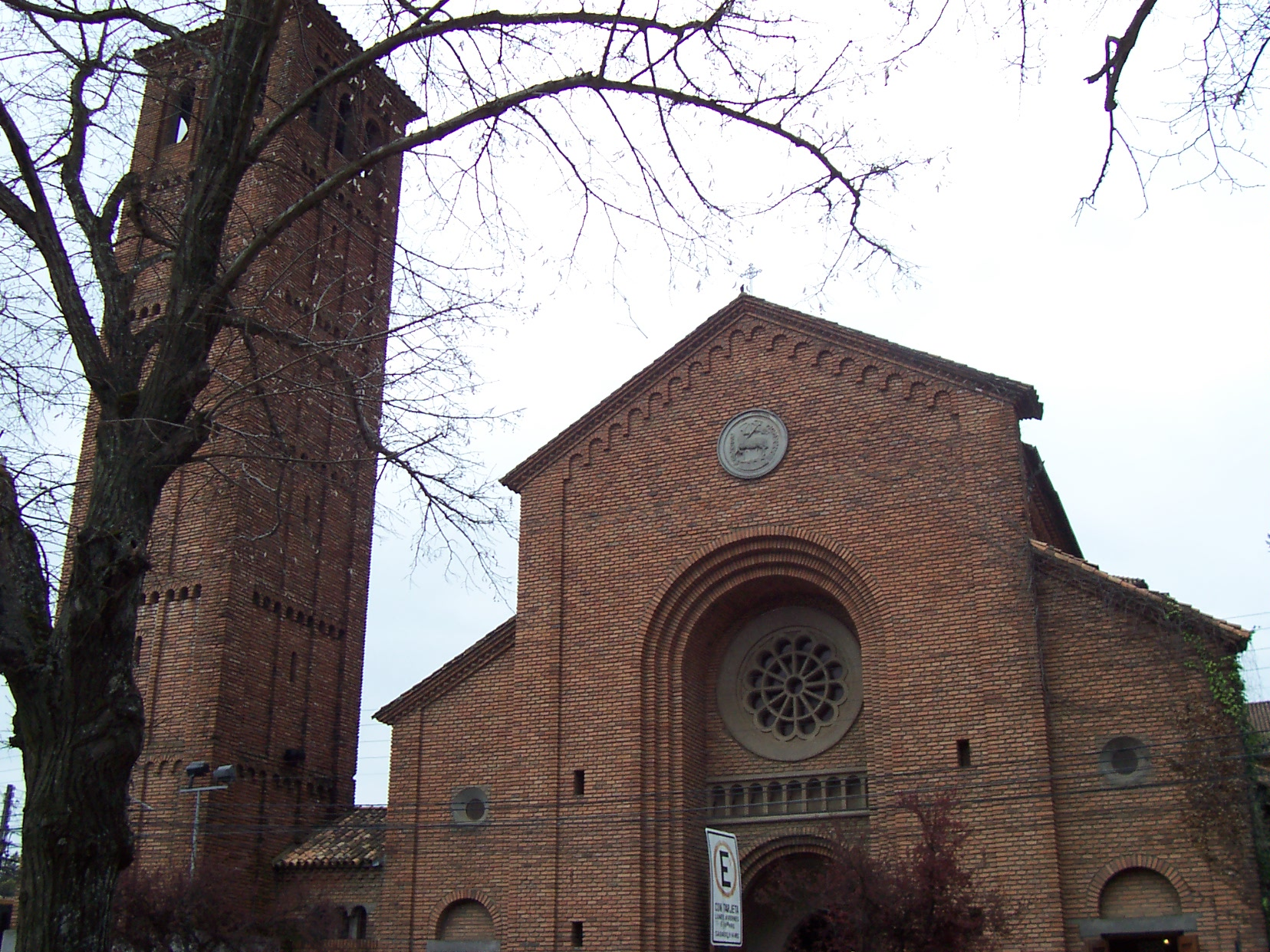
Cathedral San Ambrosio, Linares.

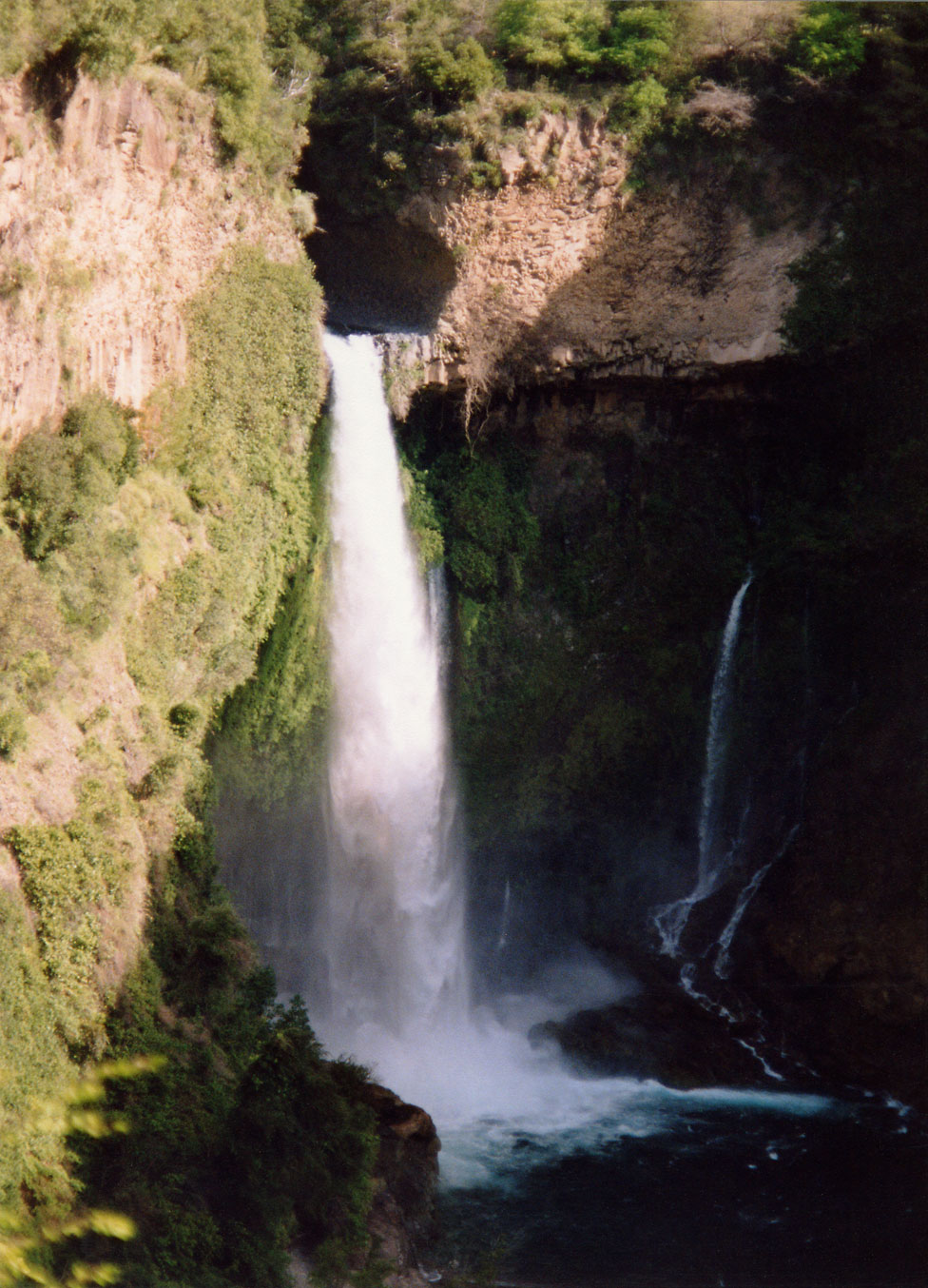
Bride's Veil Waterfall, in Molina.

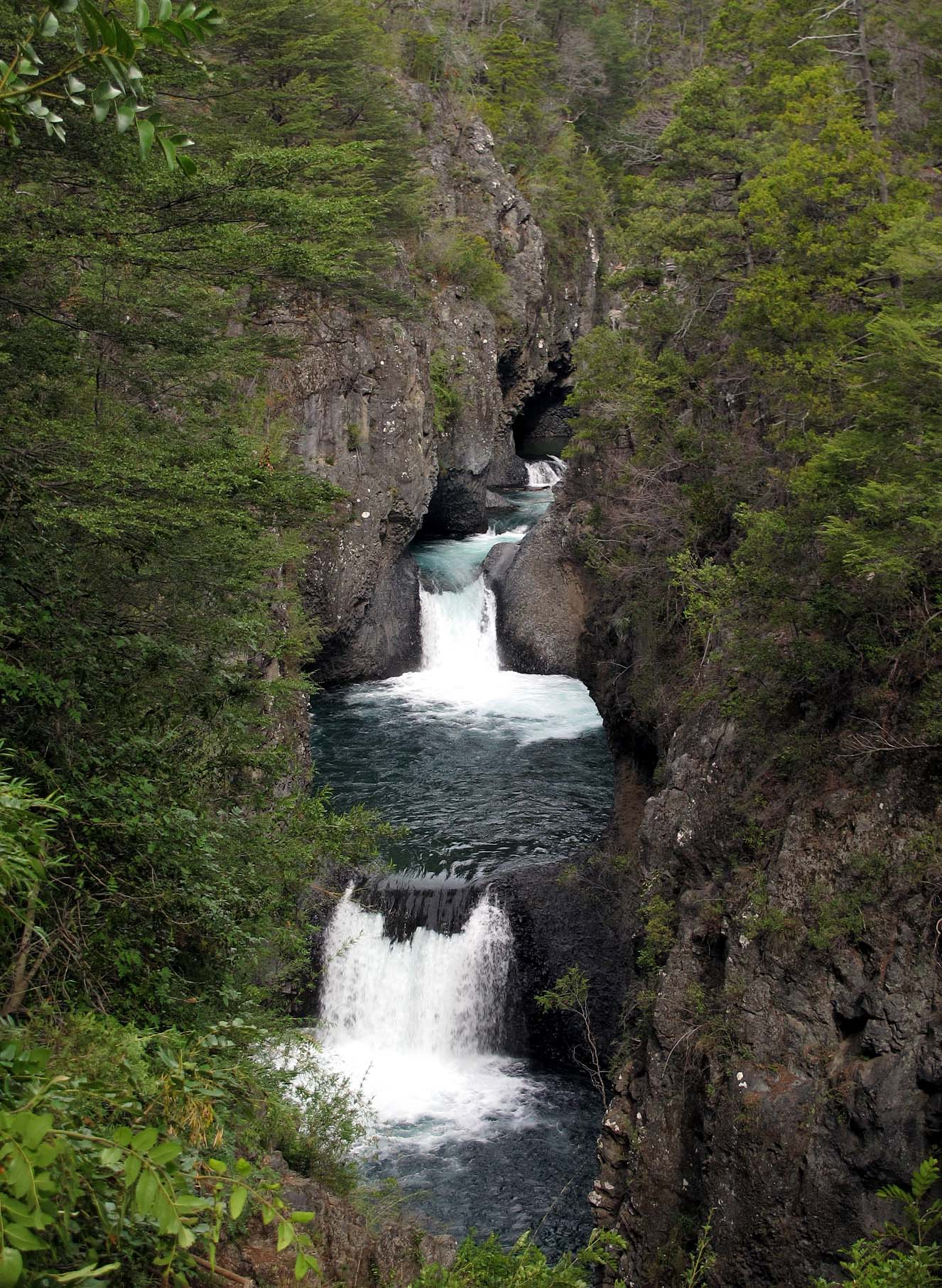
Siete Tazas waterfalls, in Molina.

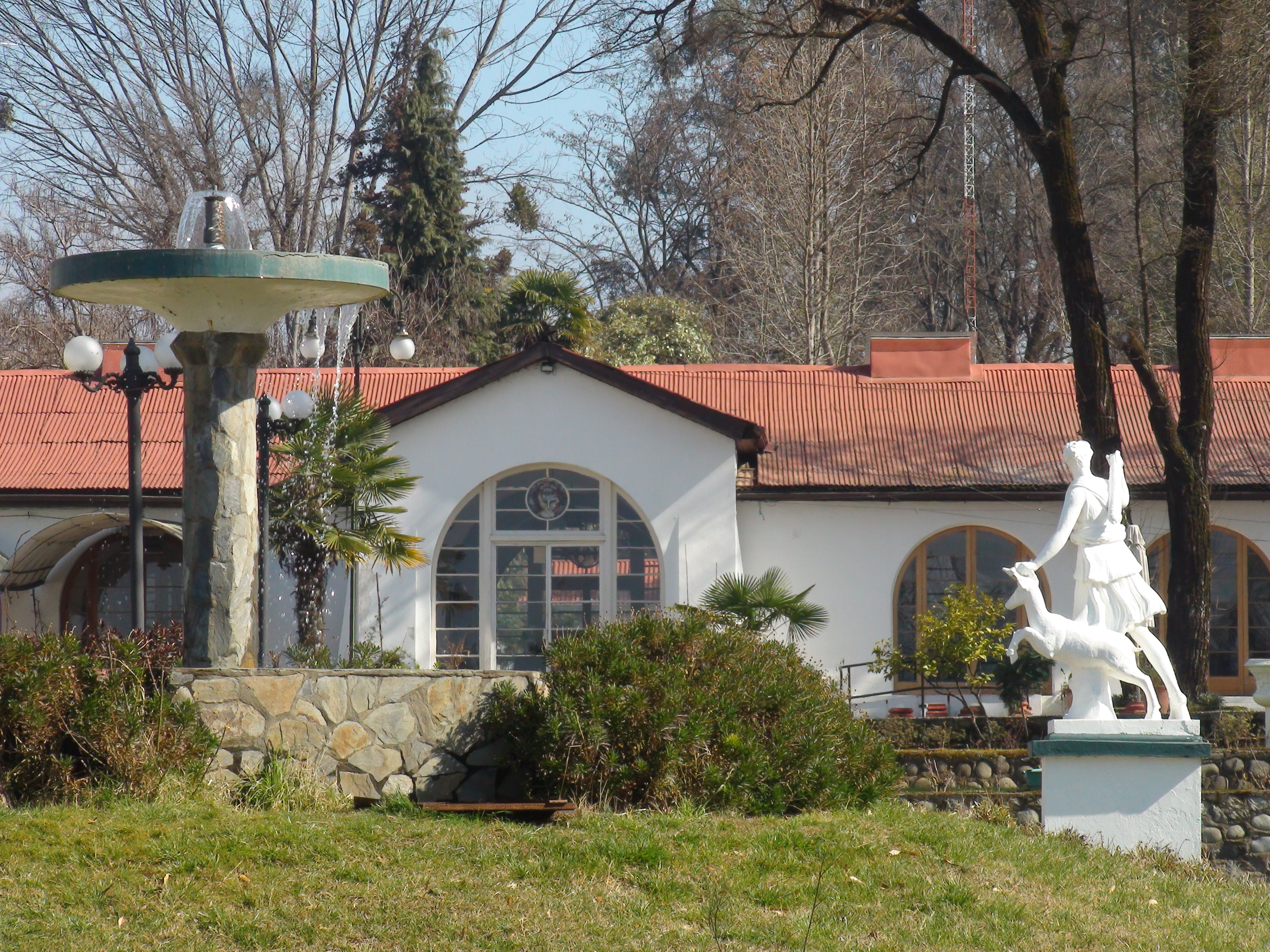
Thermal baths in Panimávida.

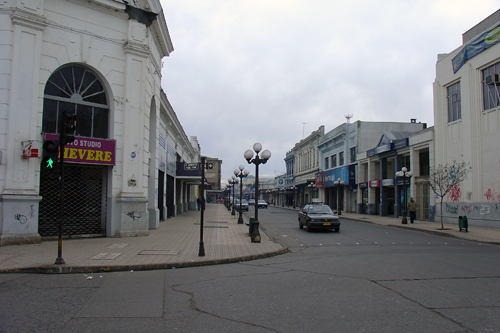
Talca's main commercial street.

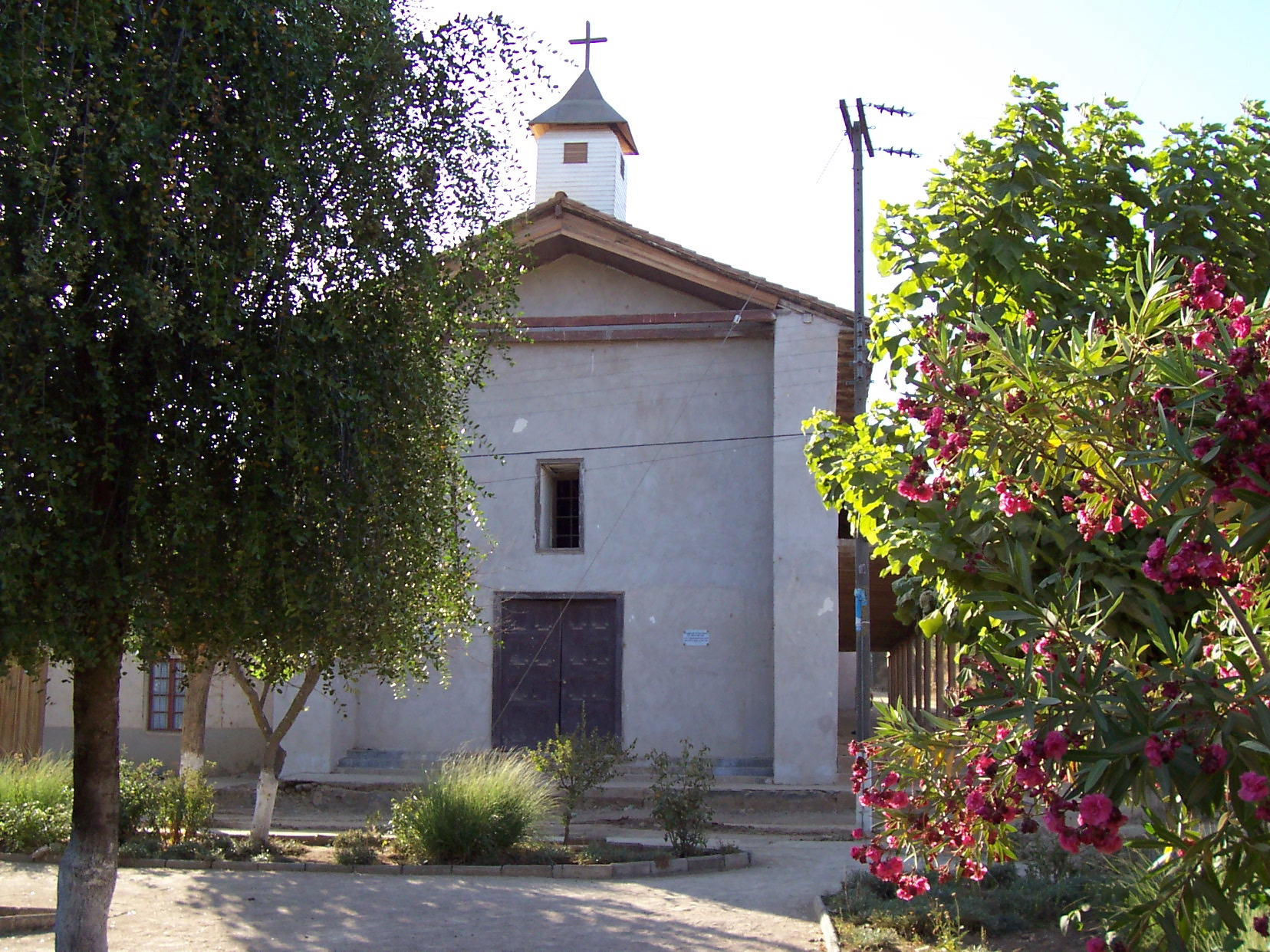
Parish church of the village of Nirivilo.

== See also ==
- Ranked list of Chilean regions
- Founding of Talca
- Juan de la Cruz y Bernardotte
- Juan Albano Pereira Márquez
