= Curepto =

- Town and Commune
- Location of Curepto commune in the Maule Region Location in Chile
- Coordinates (city): 35°05′S 72°01′W
- Country: Chile
- Region: Maule
- Province: Talca

Government
  - Type: Municipality
  - Alcalde: René Alejandro Concha González

Area
  - Total: 1,073.8 km^{2} (414.6 sq mi)
- Elevation: 9 m (30 ft)

Population (2012 Census)
  - Total: 9,380
  - Density: 8.74/km^{2} (22.6/sq mi)
  - Urban: 3,157
  - Rural: 7,655

Sex
  - Men: 5,784
  - Women: 5,028
- Time zone: UTC-4 (CLT)
  - Summer (DST): UTC-3 (CLST)
- Area code: +56 75
- Website: Municipality of Curepto

Curepto is a town and commune in the Chilean Province of Talca, located in the VII Maule Region. The commune spans an area of 1,073.8 km^{2} (415 sq mi).

== Culture ==
The town has many examples of Chilean rural colonial architecture. Its parish church is a quintessential example of a traditional religious building in the Spanish-Latin American style. The town itself exemplifies the works of the Chilean government in remote rural regions and the diversity of cultures that resulted from Spanish colonialism in the region.

Known locally as El Festival de la Camelia and named for a flower common to areas south of Santiago, this annual festival has been an example of Curepto's outgoing influence in the country. It consists of a collective concert that usually includes many Chilean musicians, and receives national radio and television coverage.

The Maule Activa initiative brought Curepto and the entire Maule Region improved internet connectivity.

Rodeo is a popular sport the country, and during the summer months Curepto's rodeo arena is often open.

== Demographics ==
According to data from the 2002 census by the National Statistics Institute, Curepto had 10,812 inhabitants; of these, 3,157 (29.2%) lived in urban areas and 7,655 (70.8%) in rural areas. At that time, there were 5,784 men and 5,028 women. The population fell by 12.0% (1,473 persons) between the 1992 and 2002 censuses.

== Administration ==
As a commune, Curepto is a third-level administrative division of Chile administered by a communal council, headed by an alcalde who is directly elected every four years. The 2008-2012 alcalde is Luis Armando González Aguilar (RN), and the municipal council has the following councilors:

- Juan Eduardo Valdés (UDI)
- Mario Gómez (PDC)
- Francisco Núñez Ramírez (PRSD)
- Dorys Sepúlveda Contreras (PS)
- Guillermo Reyes
- Aníbal Muñoz Díaz

Within the electoral divisions of Chile, Curepto (along with Constitución, Empedrado, Pencahue, Maule, San Clemente, Pelarco, Río Claro and San Rafael) is represented in the Chamber of Deputies as part of the 38th electoral district. The commune is represented in the Senate as part of the 10th senatorial constituency (Maule-North).

== El Oriflama ==
On approximately July 27, 1770 off the coast of the commune, the Spanish brig "Nuestra Señora del Buen Consejo y San Leopoldo" (Spanish for "Our Lady of the Good Council and San Leopoldo"), better known as "El Oriflama", sank off the cost of the commune near the beach named "La Trinchera" ("The Trench"). The ship was built by the French, captured by the English, and eventually sold to Charles III of Spain. It sailed from the port of Cádiz, bound the port of Callao in the Viceroyalty of Peru, loaded with huge fortunes of silver and gold pieces, stamps, fine cutlery, glassware manufactured by the "Granja de San Ildefonso", and luxurious furniture decorated with gold, costume seeds and precious fabrics. The company Oriflama S.A. cordoned off the area where the ill-fated ship remains and made a search, but the ship has not been rescued and the company is in legal disputes with the National Monuments Council.
