= OTI Festival 1980 =

9th OTI Song Festival

Date and venue
- Final: 15 November 1980
- Venue: Martín Coronado hall Teatro General San Martín; Buenos Aires, Argentina

Organization
- Organizer: Organización de Televisión Iberoamericana (OTI)

Production
- Host broadcaster: Argentina Televisora Color (ATC)
- Director: Carmelo Santiago
- Musical director: Horacio Malvicino
- Presenters: Antonio Carrizo; Liliana López Foresi

Participants
- Number of entries: 23
- Returning countries: Bolivia; Nicaragua
- Participation map: Participating countries

Vote
- Voting system: Each country awarded 5-1 points to their 5 favourite songs
- Winning song: Puerto Rico "Contigo mujer"

The OTI Festival 1980 (Spanish: Noveno Gran Premio de la Canción Iberoamericana, Portuguese: Nono Grande Prêmio da Canção Ibero-Americana) was the ninth edition of the OTI Festival, held on 15 November 1980 at the Martín Coronado hall of the Teatro General San Martín in Buenos Aires, Argentina, and presented by Antonio Carrizo and Liliana López Foresi. It was organised by the Organización de Televisión Iberoamericana (OTI) and host broadcaster Argentina Televisora Color (ATC), who staged the event following Canal Once's win in the 1979 festival for Argentina with the song "Cuenta conmigo" by Daniel Riolobos.

Broadcasters from twenty-three countries participated in the festival, reaching a new record of number of participants. The winner was the song "Contigo mujer", written by Ednita Nazario and Laureano Brizuela, and performed by Rafael José representing Puerto Rico; with "Querer y perder", written by Ray Girado, and performed by Dyango representing Spain, placing second; and "Dime adiós", written by Mario Clavell, and performed by Luis Ordóñez representing Argentina, placing third.

== Location ==
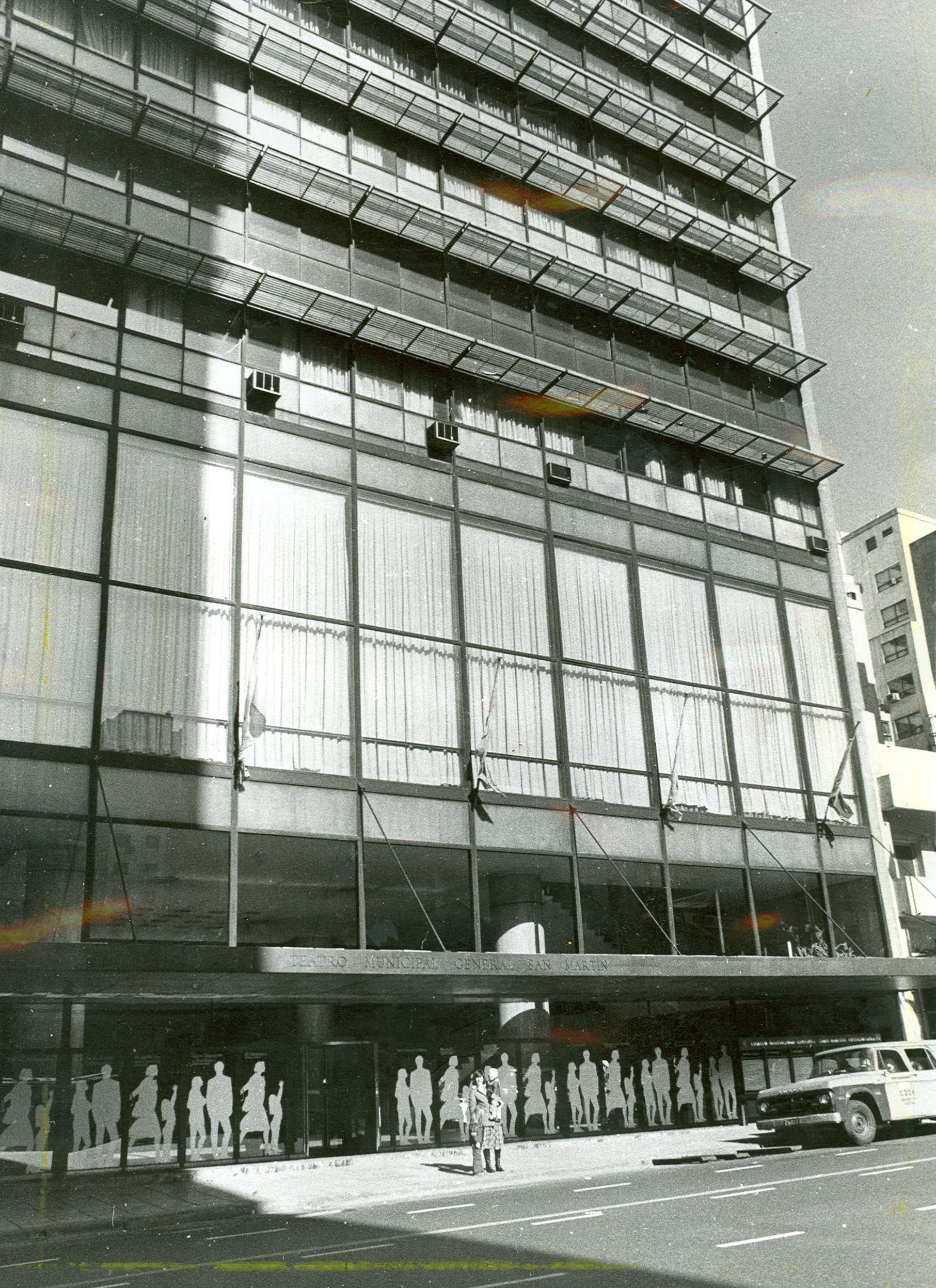
Teatro General San Martín – host venue of the OTI Festival 1980.

The Organización de Televisión Iberoamericana (OTI) accepted the proposal of Argentina Televisora Color (ATC) to host the ninth edition of the OTI Festival, following Canal Once's win in the previous edition for Argentina with the song "Cuenta conmigo" by Daniel Riolobos.

ATC staged the event in Buenos Aires. The venue selected was the Martin Coronado hall of the Teatro General San Martín. The theatre, inaugurated in 1960, is one of the oldest in the city. With 1,049 seats, the Martin Coronado hall is the biggest room of the theatre.

On 10 November 1980, a cocktail reception was held upon the arrival of the delegations, attended by all the participating artists, executives from the participating broadcasters, OTI officials, and numerous accredited journalists.

== Participants ==
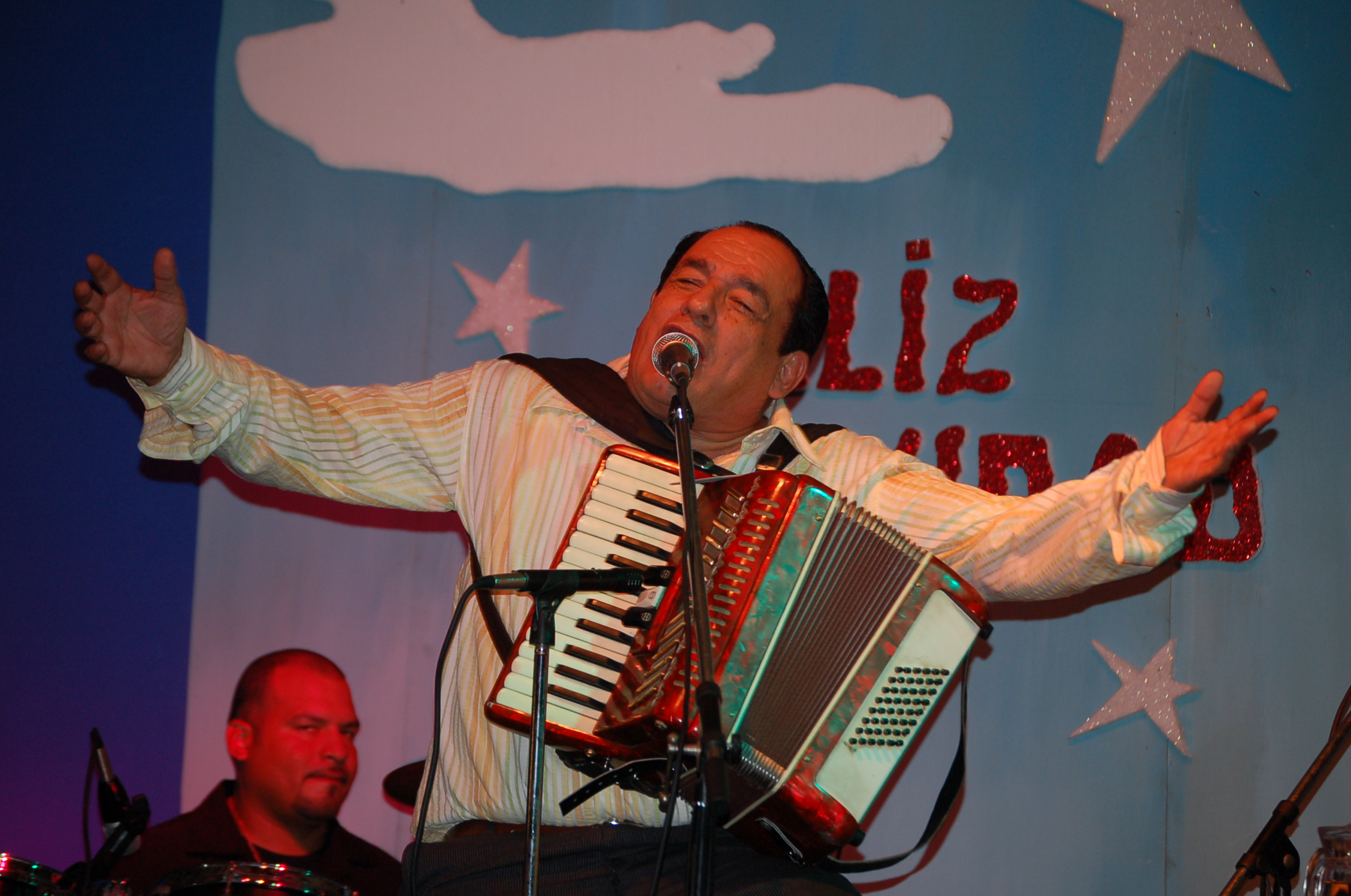
Carlos Mejía Godoy, writer of the 1977 winning song was the Nicaraguan performer in this festival.

Broadcasters from twenty-three countries participated in this edition of the OTI Festival. The OTI members, public or private broadcasters from Spain, Portugal, and twenty-one Spanish and Portuguese speaking countries of Ibero-America signed up for the festival. All countries that participated in the previous edition returned, and were joined by Bolivia, which had withdrawn in 1976, and Nicaragua, which had withdrawn in 1978. With twenty-three entries the number of participants reached a new record. All the countries that had debuted at the festival until then participated this year.

Some of the participating broadcasters, such as those representing Chile, Ecuador, Mexico, the Netherlands Antilles, Panama, and the United States, selected their entries through their regular national televised competitions. Other broadcasters decided to select their entry internally.

Two performing artists had previously represented the same country in previous editions: Rafael José had represented Puerto Rico in 1978, and Moisés Canelo had represented Honduras in 1974. In addition, Carlos Mejía Godoy, representing Nicaragua as a performer with los de Palancagüina, had written "Quincho barrilete", the winning song of the 1977 festival.

Participants of the OTI Festival 1980
Country	Broadcaster(s)	Song	Artist	Songwriter(s)	Language	Conductor
Argentina	Canal Once	"Dime adiós"	Luis Ordóñez	Mario Clavell	Spanish	Horacio Malvicino
Bolivia	TVB	"¡Qué suerte, qué pena!"	Susana Joffré	René Calderón Cortés; Lalo Lafaye Morris	Spanish	René Calderón Cortés
Brazil	TV Cultura	"Convite ao vento"	Márcia	Dino Galvão Bueno	Portuguese	José Briamonte
Chile	TVN; UCTV; UTV	"Sin razón"	Nino García	Nino García	Spanish	Gonzalo García
Colombia	Caracol Televisión; PUNCH; RTI	"¿Por cuánto tiempo?"	Jaime Valencia	Henry Laguado; Jaime Valencia	Spanish	Armando Velázquez
Costa Rica	Telecentro; Teletica	"El amor se va"	Ricardo Padilla	Ricardo Padilla	Spanish	Roberto Prais
Dominican Republic		"Canción de un hombre simple"	Fausto Rey	Jorge Taveras; Yaqui Núñez del Risco	Spanish	Jorge Taveras
Ecuador	AECTV	"En un instante"	Jeaneth Salgado	Francisco José Betancourt	Spanish	Julio Cármenes
El Salvador		"El séptimo día"	Ricardo Alfaro	José Francisco Bolaños Lemus	Spanish	Héctor Rojas
Guatemala		"Suave y dulcemente"	Madrigal Band	Óscar Eduardo Conde	Spanish	Vinicio Quesada
Honduras		"Tú, siempre tú"	Moisés Canelo	Alberto Valladares	Spanish	Tino Geiser
Mexico	Televisa	"Sólo te amo a ti"	José Roberto	José Roberto	Spanish	Javier Macías
Netherlands Antilles	ATM	"Amor para ti"	Lidwina Booi	Nena Bennet; Eddy Bennet	Spanish	Roberto Montiel
Nicaragua	SSTV	"La chavalita de España"	Carlos Mejía Godoy y los de Palancagüina	Carlos Mejía Godoy	Spanish	Alberto Gambino
Panama	RPC-TV	"Puede ser"	Solinka	Simón Abadi	Spanish	Alexis Castillo
Paraguay		"La razón que nos une"	Carlos Albospino	Antonio Medina	Spanish	Oscar Cardozo Ocampo
Peru		"Un buen motivo para amar"	Regina Alcóver	Regina Alcóver	Spanish	Víctor Salazar
Portugal	RTP	"À tua espera"	Simone de Oliveira	Tozé Brito; Pedro Brito	Portuguese	Jorge Costa Pinto
Puerto Rico	Canal 2 Telemundo	"Contigo mujer"	Rafael José	Ednita Nazario; Laureano Brizuela	Spanish	Jorge Calandrelli
Spain	TVE	"Querer y perder"	Dyango	Ray Girado	Spanish	Alfredo Doménech
United States	SIN	"El extranjero"	Rammiro Velasco	Rammiro Velasco	Spanish	Tony Ramírez
Uruguay	Sociedad Televisora Larrañaga	"Te lo quedé diciendo"	Juca Sheppard	Federico Silva; Dardo Martínez	Spanish	Julio Frade
Venezuela	RCTV	"Haces bien"	Héctor Cabrera	Pablo Schneider	Spanish	Eduardo Cabrera

== Festival overview ==
The festival was held on Saturday 15 November 1980, beginning at 20:00 DST (23:00 UTC). It was presented by Antonio Carrizo and Liliana López Foresi. The musical director was Horacio Malvicino who conducted the 58-piece orchestra when required. The draw to determine the running order (R/O) was held in Buenos Aires a few days before the event. Participants had rehearsed at the venue on 11–14 November in morning and afternoon sessions.

The winner was the song "Contigo mujer", written by Ednita Nazario and Laureano Brizuela, and performed by Rafael José representing Puerto Rico; with "Querer y perder", written by Ray Girado, and performed by Dyango representing Spain, placing second; and "Dime adiós", written by Mario Clavell, and performed by Luis Ordóñez representing Argentina, placing third.

Winner

Results of the OTI Festival 1980
R/O	Country	Song	Artist	Points	Place
1	Chile	"Sin razón"	Nino García	9	14
2	Uruguay	"Te lo quedé diciendo"	Juca Sheppard	4	19
3	Argentina	"Dime adiós"	Luis Ordóñez	31	3
4	Panama	"Puede ser"	Solinka	8	16
5	Peru	"Un buen motivo para amar"	Regina Alcóver	13	11
6	Puerto Rico	"Contigo mujer"	Rafael José	36	1
7	Paraguay	"La razón que nos une"	Carlos Albospino	7	17
8	Venezuela	"Haces bien"	Héctor Cabrera	5	18
9	United States	"El extranjero"	Rammiro Velasco	11	13
10	Nicaragua	"La chavalita de España"	Carlos Mejía Godoy y los de Palacagüina	15	10
11	El Salvador	"El séptimo día"	Ricardo Alfaro	4	19
12	Netherlands Antilles	"Amor para ti"	Lidwina Booi	0	22
13	Spain	"Querer y perder"	Dyango	32	2
14	Portugal	"À tua espera"	Simone de Oliveira	9	14
15	Brazil	"Convite ao vento"	Márcia	29	4
16	Guatemala	"Suave y dulcemente"	Grupo Madrigal	19	9
17	Mexico	"Sólo te amo a ti"	José Roberto	21	8
18	Honduras	"Tú, siempre tú"	Moisés Canelo	22	7
19	Bolivia	"¡Qué suerte, qué pena!"	Susana Joffré	0	22
20	Dominican Republic	"Canción de un hombre simple"	Fausto Rey	25	6
21	Colombia	"Por cuánto tiempo"	Jaime Valencia	13	11
22	Costa Rica	"El amor se va"	Ricardo Padilla	29	4
23	Ecuador	"En un instante"	Jeaneth Salgado	3	21

== Detailed voting results ==
Each participating broadcaster (Note: Or group of broadcasters that jointly participated representing a country.) assembled a national jury located in its respective country. Each jury awarded 5 points its favourite song, 4 points to the second favourite, and then between 3 and 1 points for the third- to fifth-favourite songs, except for the entry representing its own country. Each participating broadcaster had also a delegate present in the hall to stand in for its jury if it was not receiving the event live, or in case of communication failure during the broadcast or voting. To ensure that there was no vote switching, before the voting segment began each participating broadcaster announced to its national audience the vote of its jury in local opt-out from its studios.

All the countries gave their votes remotely by telephone, except for Bolivia, and the Netherlands Antilles, which used the stand-in delegates. The countries voted in order of participation.

Detailed voting results of the OTI Festival 1980
Voter: National jury Stand-in delegate		Voting countries																							Points
Voter: National jury Stand-in delegate		Chile	Uruguay	Argentina	Panama	Peru	Puerto Rico	Paraguay	Venezuela	United States	Nicaragua	El Salvador	Netherlands Antilles	Spain	Portugal	Brazil	Guatemala	Mexico	Honduras	Bolivia	Dominican Republic	Colombia	Costa Rica	Ecuador	Points
Contestants	Chile								3								1	4						1	9
Contestants	Uruguay	2						2																	4
Contestants	Argentina		1			5		5				5	4		5				3	3					31
Contestants	Panama	5									3														8
Contestants	Peru							3						5							5				13
Contestants	Puerto Rico	4	4	1	5			4	1	3							2	5				2		5	36
Contestants	Paraguay													3						4					7
Contestants	Venezuela				1						2		2												5
Contestants	United States					1								2	4						4				11
Contestants	Nicaragua				3							3				4							3	2	15
Contestants	El Salvador																		1		3				4
Contestants	Netherlands Antilles																								0
Contestants	Spain	3		3		4	4			4	4		3					2				5			32
Contestants	Portugal												5			2				2					9
Contestants	Brazil		2			2			5			1			3		4					4	4	4	29
Contestants	Guatemala				4					5						1			2		2		5		19
Contestants	Mexico		5	5			1			1	5								4						21
Contestants	Honduras											4		4			5			5	1	1	2		22
Contestants	Bolivia																								0
Contestants	Dominican Republic			4			3		4	2			1		2	5							1	3	25
Contestants	Colombia	1					5							1		3		3							13
Contestants	Costa Rica		3	2	2	3	2	1			1	2			1		3	1	5			3			29
Contestants	Ecuador								2											1					3

== Broadcast ==
The festival was broadcast in the 23 participating countries, where the corresponding OTI member broadcasters relayed the contest through their networks after receiving it live via satellite.

Known details on the broadcasts of the festival in each country, including the specific broadcasting stations, commentators, and presenters of the local opt-out are shown in the tables below.

Broadcasters, commentators, and local presenters in participating countries
Country	Broadcaster	Channel(s)	Commentator(s)	Local presenter(s)	Ref.
Argentina	ATC	Canal 7			
Chile	TVN	Canal 7			
Chile	UTV	Canal 11			
Chile	UCTV	Canal 13 (Note: Delayed broadcast at 21:20 CLST (00:20+1 UTC))			
Chile	Radio La Clave				
Colombia	Inravisión (Note: Through the programadoras: Caracol Televisión, Producciones Nacionales Colombianas de Hoy (PUNCH), and Radio Televisión Interamericana (RTI).)	Segunda Cadena (Note: Delayed broadcast at 21:30 COT (02:30+1 UTC))			
Costa Rica	Telecentro	Telecentro Canal 6			
Costa Rica	Teletica	Canal 7			
Mexico	Televisa	Canal 2 (Note: Delayed broadcast at 17:30 CST (23:30 UTC))			
Netherlands Antilles	ATM	TeleAruba			
Netherlands Antilles	ATM	TeleCuraçao			
Panama	RPC-TV	Canal 4			
Portugal	RTP	RTP1			
Spain	TVE	TVE 1			

== Reception ==
The victory of the Puerto Rican performer Rafael José, who is a licensed dentist apart from a singer, was seen in his home country as another milestone in the national musical scene to the point that it is even said that the festival paralysed the country and made the audience forget the protests that took place because of a national electoral process that was overshadowed by a possible fraud. As happened five years before with Nydia Caro, the previous Puerto Rican OTI winner. Rafael José and the composer of his entry, Ednita Nazario were received by a huge crowd at his return to San Juan.

The second place of the Spaniard Dyango consolidated his already long career and also his position as one of the most important musicians in the Spanish national pop scene.

The host contestant Luis Ordóñez had already a long career in Argentina. In fact, he debuted in 1956 and pursued, since then, a career both as a writer, a songwriter and also as a singer. His third place confirmed the strength of his career.

Other contestants such as the Dominican Fausto Rey and the Nicaraguan Carlos Mejía Godoy, went on with their strong musical careers releasing more studio albums and creating music for many more singers.
