= OTI Festival 1981 =

10th OTI Song Festival

Date and venue
- Final: 5 December 1981
- Venue: National Auditorium; Mexico City, Mexico

Organization
- Organizer: Organización de Televisión Iberoamericana (OTI)
- Supervisor: Condorcet Da Silva Costa
- Host broadcaster: Televisa
- Presenter: Raúl Velasco

Participants
- Number of entries: 21
- Non-returning countries: Bolivia; Dominican Republic
- Participation map: Participating countries Countries that participated in the past but not in 1981

Vote
- Voting system: Each country awarded 5-1 points to their 5 favourite songs
- Winning song: Spain "Latino"

The OTI Festival 1981 (Spanish: Décimo Gran Premio de la Canción Iberoamericana, Portuguese: Décimo Grande Prêmio da Canção Ibero-Americana) was the 10th edition of the OTI Festival, held on 5 December 1981 at the National Auditorium in Mexico City, Mexico, and presented by Raúl Velasco. It was organised by the Organización de Televisión Iberoamericana (OTI) and host broadcaster Televisa.

Broadcasters from twenty-one countries participated in the festival. The winner was the song "Latino", written by Pablo Herrero and José Luis Armenteros, and performed by Francisco representing Spain; with "Súbete a mi nube", written by Chico Novarro and Mike Ribas, and performed by Marianella representing Argentina, placing second; and "Lo que pasó, pasó", written by Felipe Gil, and performed by Yoshio representing Mexico, and "Cuando fuiste mujer", written by Vilma Planas and Héctor Garrido, and performed by Aldo Matta representing the United States, both placing third.

== Location ==
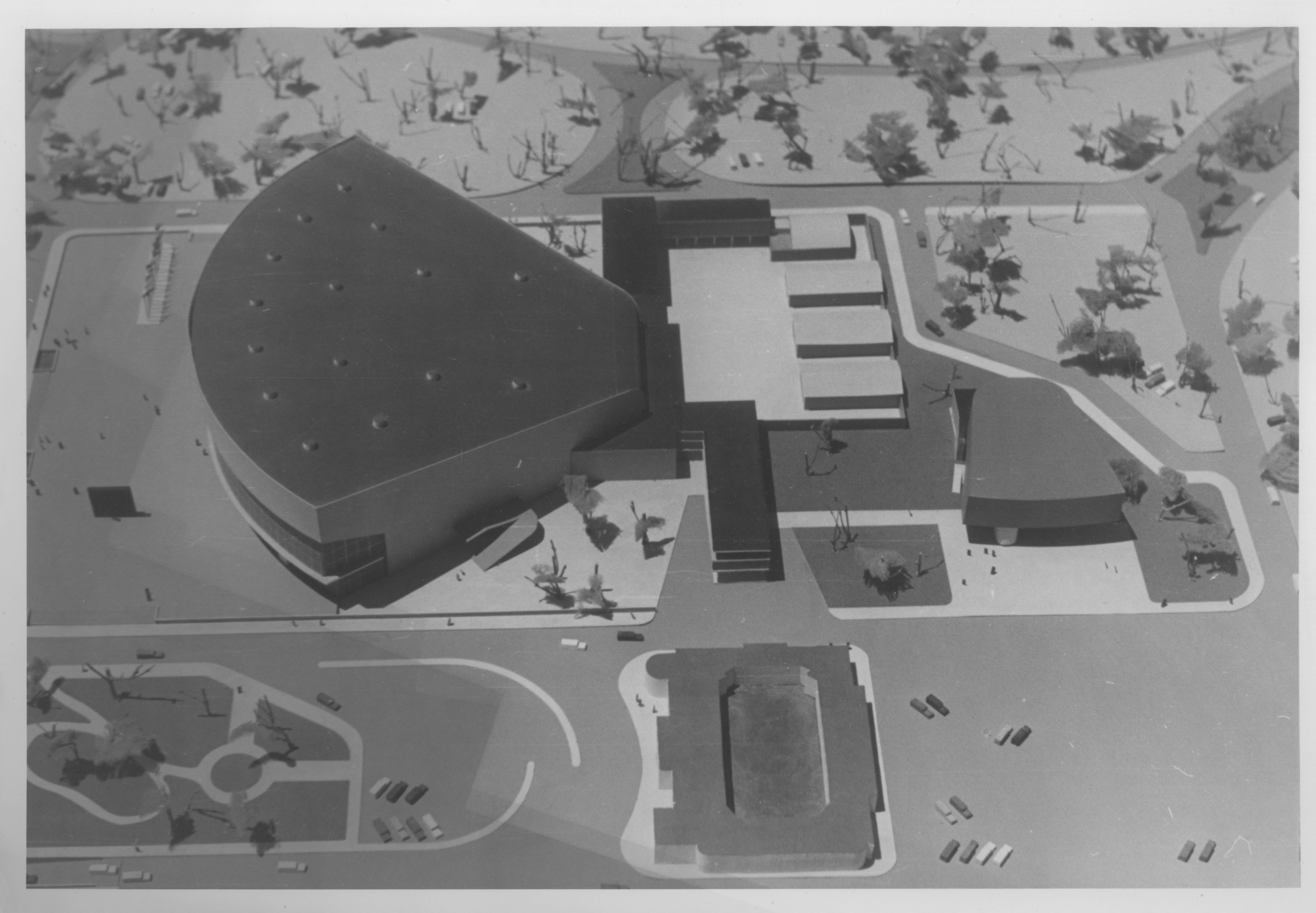
National Auditorium, Mexico City – host venue of the OTI Festival 1981.

The Organización de Televisión Iberoamericana (OTI) designated Televisa as the host broadcaster for the 10th edition of the OTI Festival. Televisa staged the event in Mexico City. The venue selected was the National Auditorium, which was the most important entertainment venue in the country. It was opened in 1952 and was designed by Pedro Ramírez Vázquez and Gonzalo Ramírez del Sordo. In 1989, the auditorium underwent a complete renovation, of which only the stands on the first two floors were preserved.

The participating delegations were accommodated at Hotel Chapultepec.

== Participants ==
Broadcasters from twenty-one countries participated in this edition of the OTI festival. The OTI members, public or private broadcasters from Spain, Portugal, and nineteen Spanish and Portuguese speaking countries of Ibero-America signed up for the festival. Except for Bolivia and the Dominican Republic, all other countries that participated in the previous edition returned.

Some of the participating broadcasters, such as those representing Chile, Mexico, the Netherlands Antilles, and the United States, selected their entries through their regular national televised competitions. Other broadcasters decided to select their entry internally.

Five performing artists had previously represented the same country in previous editions: Eduardo Fuentes had represented El Salvador in 1975, Gladys Mercado had represented Peru in 1975, Florcita Motuda had represented Chile in 1978, Roger Barés had represented Panama in 1978, and José Cid had represented Portugal in 1979.

Participants of the OTI Festival 1981
Country	Broadcaster(s)	Song	Artist	Songwriter(s)	Language	Conductor
Argentina	Canal Once	"Súbete a mi nube"	Marianella	Chico Novarro; Mike Ribas	Spanish	Mike Ribas
Brazil	TV Cultura	"Renascença"	Cláudya	Edmundo Villani-Côrtes	Portuguese	
Chile	TVN; UCTV; UTV	"Si hoy tenemos que cantar a tanta gente, pensémoslo"	Florcita Motuda	Raúl Alarcón	Spanish	
Colombia	Caracol Televisión; PUNCH; RTI	"Si nací por amor, yo nací para amar"	Jaime D'Alberto	Jaime D'Alberto	Spanish	
Costa Rica	Telecentro; Teletica	"Cantaré"	Juan Carlos Wong G.	Linnette Madrigal; Luis Marín	Spanish	
Ecuador	AECTV	"América"	Hermanos Diablo	Juan Carlos Terán G.	Spanish	
El Salvador		"El latinoamericano"	Eduardo Fuentes	Carlos Alberto Hernández	Spanish	
Guatemala		"Estoy loco"	Sergio Iván	Hilda Cofiño	Spanish	
Honduras		"Ven"	Oneyda	Alberto Valladares	Spanish	
Mexico	Televisa	"Lo que pasó, pasó"	Yoshio	Felipe Gil	Spanish	
Netherlands Antilles	ATM	"Vaya un amigo"	Efrem Benita	Efrem Benita	Spanish	
Nicaragua	SSTV	"Asi te quiero yo"	Luis Enrique Mejía Godoy	Luis Enrique Mejía Godoy	Spanish	
Panama		"Pero ayer fuiste sólo María"	Roger Barés	Pablo Azael	Spanish	
Paraguay	TCC	"Vos y yo seremos todos"	Alberto de Luque	Alberto de Luque; Humberto Rubín	Spanish	
Peru	CPR	"Hombre de mis sueños"	Gladys Mercado	Violeta Roggero	Spanish	
Portugal	RTP	"Uma lágrima"	José Cid	José Cid	Portuguese	
Puerto Rico	Canal 2 Telemundo	"Mírame a los ojos"	Glenn Monroig	Glenn Monroig	Spanish	
Spain	TVE	"Latino"	Francisco	Pablo Herrero; José Luis Armenteros	Spanish	Jesús Glück
United States	SIN	"Cuando fuiste mujer"	Aldo Matta	Vilma Planas; Héctor Garrido	Spanish	Héctor Garrido
Uruguay	Sociedad Televisora Larrañaga	"Olvidemos recordando"	Ariel	Mario de Azagra	Spanish	
Venezuela		"Aquel ciego"	Neyda Perdomo	César Menessini	Spanish	

== Festival overview ==
The festival was held on Saturday 5 December 1981, beginning at 17:00 CST (23:00 UTC). It was presented by Raúl Velasco, who had previously presented the festival in 1974 and 1976.

The winner was the song "Latino", written by Pablo Herrero and José Luis Armenteros, and performed by Francisco representing Spain; with "Súbete a mi nube", written by Chico Novarro and Mike Ribas, and performed by Marianella representing Argentina, placing second; and "Lo que pasó, pasó", written by Felipe Gil, and performed by Yoshio representing Mexico, and "Cuando fuiste mujer", written by Vilma Planas and Héctor Garrido, and performed by Aldo Matta representing the United States, both placing third. There was one trophy designed by Francisco Moyao for each of the first three places. The first prize trophy was delivered by Guillermo Cañedo, president of OTI, and Alejandro Sada, vice-president of Televisa; the second prize trophy by Nicanor González, president of the OTI programs committee; and the third prize trophy by Alfredo Escobar, vice-president of the OTI programs committee. The festival ended with a reprise of the winning entry.

Winner

Results of the OTI Festival 1981
R/O	Country	Song	Artist	Points	Result
1	Portugal	"Uma lágrima"	José Cid	14	10
2	Uruguay	"Olvidemos recordando"	Ariel	4	19
3	El Salvador	"El latinoamericano"	Eduardo Fuentes	11	12
4	Nicaragua	"Asi te quiero yo"	Luis Enrique Mejía Godoy	15	8
5	Venezuela	"Aquel ciego"	Neyda Perdomo	7	17
6	United States	"Cuando fuiste mujer"	Aldo Matta	22	3
7	Guatemala	"Estoy loco"	Sergio Iván	1	21
8	Spain	"Latino"	Francisco	51	1
9	Ecuador	"América"	Hermanos Diablo	11	12
10	Panama	"Pero ayer fuiste sólo María"	Roger Barés	7	17
11	Puerto Rico	"Mírame a los ojos"	Glenn Monroig	8	15
12	Netherlands Antilles	"Vaya un amigo"	Efrem Benita	2	20
13	Brazil	"Renascença"	Cláudya	14	10
14	Honduras	"Ven"	Oneyda	16	7
15	Colombia	"Si nací por amor, yo nací para amar"	Jaime D'Alberto	18	5
16	Mexico	"Lo que pasó, pasó"	Yoshio	22	3
17	Peru	"Hombre de mis sueños"	Gladys Mercado	11	12
18	Paraguay	"Vos y yo seremos todos"	Alberto de Luque	15	8
19	Argentina	"Súbete a mi nube"	Marianella	40	2
20	Costa Rica	"Cantaré"	Juan Carlos Wong G.	8	15
21	Chile	"Si hoy tenemos que cantar a tanta gente, pensémoslo"	Florcita Motuda	18	5

=== Spokespersons ===
Each participating broadcaster (Note: Or group of broadcasters that jointly participated representing a country.) appointed a spokesperson who was responsible for announcing the points for their respective jury in ascending order. Known spokespersons at the 1981 festival are listed below.

- Spain – Pepe Domingo Castaño
- Mexico – Janet Arceo
- Peru – Luis Ángel Pinasco

== Detailed voting results ==
Each participating broadcaster assembled a national jury located in its respective country. Each jury awarded 5 points its favourite song, 4 points to the second favourite, and then between 3 and 1 points for the third- to fifth-favourite songs, except for the entry representing its own country. Each participating broadcaster had also a delegate present in the hall to stand in for its jury if it was not receiving the event live, or in case of communication failure during the broadcast or voting. To ensure that there was no vote switching, before the voting segment began each participating broadcaster announced to its national audience the vote of its jury in local opt-out from its studios. In the event of a tie for first place, the stand-in delegates from the countries not affected by the tie would vote to select the winning song from among the tied ones.

The point count was displayed on a scoreboard placed to the left of the stage. All the countries gave their votes remotely by telephone, except for those that used the stand-in delegates, which included Argentina, Chile, Colombia, Costa Rica, Netherlands Antilles, and Uruguay. (Note: Ana M. Arregui voted for Argentina, Ricardo Miranda for Chile, Lilia Gamba de Lazo for Colombia, Ricardo Padilla for Costa Rica, Humberto Nivi for the Netherlands Antilles, and Cristina de Frade for Uruguay.)

Detailed voting results of the OTI Festival 1981
Voter: National jury Stand-in delegate		Voting countries																					Points
Voter: National jury Stand-in delegate		Portugal	Uruguay	El Salvador	Nicaragua	Venezuela	United States	Guatemala	Spain	Ecuador	Panama	Puerto Rico	Netherlands Antilles	Brazil	Honduras	Colombia	Mexico	Peru	Paraguay	Argentina	Costa Rica	Chile	Points
Contestants	Portugal							3		4						4			1	2			14
Contestants	Uruguay																			4			4
Contestants	El Salvador				2			2							1			1	5				11
Contestants	Nicaragua	4								5				5			1						15
Contestants	Venezuela		3				1						1		2								7
Contestants	United States								4		5	4	5	4									22
Contestants	Guatemala										1												1
Contestants	Spain	3		3	3	2	2	5			2	5			5	5	4	4	3	5			51
Contestants	Ecuador	1	2	2		1																5	11
Contestants	Panama														3				4				7
Contestants	Puerto Rico																5		2		1		8
Contestants	Netherlands Antilles							1														1	2
Contestants	Brazil					4				2						2		2			2	2	14
Contestants	Honduras				4						3		3								3	3	16
Contestants	Colombia			4			5	4		1					4								18
Contestants	Mexico		1		5	3	4					1	4			1		3					22
Contestants	Peru				1				3					3								4	11
Contestants	Paraguay	5	5						1	3				1									15
Contestants	Argentina	2	4	5		5	3		2		4	3					3	5			4		40
Contestants	Costa Rica								5											3			8
Contestants	Chile			1								2	2	2		3	2			1	5		18

== Broadcast ==
The festival was broadcast in the 21 participating countries, where the corresponding OTI member broadcasters relayed the contest through their networks after receiving it live via satellite.

Known details on the broadcasts of the festival in each country, including the specific broadcasting stations, commentators, and presenters of the local opt-out are shown in the tables below.

Broadcasters, commentators, and local presenters in participating countries
Country	Broadcaster	Channel(s)	Commentator(s)	Local presenter(s)	Ref.
Argentina	Canal Once				
Chile	TVN	Canal 7 (Note: Delayed broadcast at 21:30 CLST (00:30+1 UTC))		Juan Guillermo Vivado	
Chile	UTV	Canal 11		Juan Guillermo Vivado	
Chile	UCTV	Canal 13		Juan Guillermo Vivado	
Costa Rica	Telecentro	Telecentro Canal 6			
Costa Rica	Teletica	Canal 7			
Mexico	Televisa	Canal 2			
Netherlands Antilles	ATM	TeleAruba			
Netherlands Antilles	ATM	TeleCuraçao			
Portugal	RTP	RTP1 (Note: Delayed broadcast on 7 December at 20:50 WET (20:50 UTC))			
Spain	TVE	TVE 1			
United States	SIN				
