= Pablo Prieto =

Chilean politician and footballer

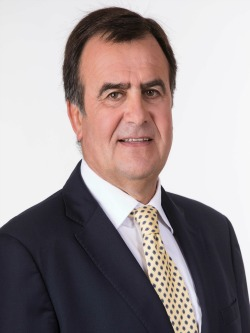

Member of the Chamber of Deputies
- In office 11 March 2018 – 11 March 2022
- Preceded by: Creation of the District
- Constituency: District 17
- In office 11 March 2002 – 11 March 2006
- Preceded by: Homero Gutiérrez
- Succeeded by: Germán Verdugo
- Constituency: Talca (37th District)

Personal details
- Born: 4 May 1959 (age 67) Santiago, Chile
- Party: UDI (2005–2017); RN (2017–2018)
Association football career
- Position: Centre back
Senior career*
Years	Team	Apps	(Gls)
1977–1979	Cobreloa		
1980–1991	Rangers		
1984	→ Universidad de Chile (loan)		
1986–1987	→ Everton (loan)		
- * Club domestic league appearances and goals

Pablo Samuel Prieto Lorca (born 4 May 1959) is a Chilean former footballer and politician who served as a member of the Chamber of Deputies of his country.
