= Mexico in the OTI Festival 1981 =

- OTI Festival 1981
- Participating broadcaster: Televisa
- Country: Mexico
- Selection process: National OTI Festival
- Selection date: 20 September 1981

Competing entry
- Song: "Lo que pasó, pasó"
- Artist: Yoshio
- Songwriter: Felipe Gil

Placement
- Final result: 3rd, 22 points

Participation chronology
◄1980 •	1981	• 1982►

Mexico was represented at the OTI Festival 1981 with the song "Lo que pasó, pasó", written by Felipe Gil, and performed by Yoshio. The Mexican participating broadcaster, Televisa, selected its entry through a national televised competition with several phases. The song, that was performed in position 16, placed third with 22 points, tying with the entry from the United States, out of 21 competing entries. In addition, Televisa was also the host broadcaster and staged the event at the National Auditorium in Mexico City.

== National stage ==
Televisa held a national competition with four televised qualifying rounds and a final to select its entry for the 10th edition of the OTI Festival. This tenth edition of the National OTI Festival featured forty songs, of which ten reached the final. In addition to the general competition, awards were given for Best Male Performer, Best Female Performer, Best Musical Arrangement, and Breakout Artist among all the competing artists.

The qualifying rounds were held at Teatro de la Ciudad, while the final was held at the National Auditorium in Mexico City, all presented by Raúl Velasco. The musical director was Chucho Ferrrer, who conducted the orchestra when required. Hermanos Zavala, the single mixed backing choir, were credited on the songs they accompanied.

Competing entries on the National OTI Festival – Mexico 1981
Song	Artist	Songwriter(s)	Conductor
"Aquí todo sigue igual"	Natalia Baeza	Roberto Robles; Natalia Baeza	Eduardo Magallanes
"Barato"	María del Sol	Joan Sebastian	Chucho Ferrer
"Busco algo más"	David Haro	David Haro	Guillermo Méndez Guiú
"Canción de fe"	Ramiro José Esperanza	Ramiro José Esperanza; Luis Simón Montaño	Eduardo Magallanes
"Canto mi canto"	Guadalupe Jimena	Mario Molina Montes; Lázaro Muñiz	Lázaro Muñiz
"Cien millones de locos"	Sergio Esquivel	Sergio Esquivel	Armando Noriega
"Con mi nuevo amor"	Arturo Castro	Arturo Castro	
"Concierto para un amor"	María Medina	María Medina; Renato López	Armando Noriega
"Deja"	Yuri	José María Napoleón	Julio Jaramillo
"Dímelo"	Óscar	Arnulfo M. Vega	Rodolfo "Popo" Sánchez
"Dos iguales que arena y mar"	Matty Bello	José Alberto Fuentes	Rodolfo "Popo" Sánchez
"En las buenas y en las malas"	Sonia Rivas	Sonia Rivas	Chucho Ferrer
"Esta vez"	Mario Pintor	Mario Pintor	Luigi Lazareno
"Estúpido romántico"	Felipe Gil	Felipe Gil	Chucho Ferrer
"Flores de papel"	Manuel Adrián	Clarisa Lasky; Víctor Algranti	Rodolfo "Popo" Sánchez
"Fuego sobre la nieve"	Arianna	Manuel Antonio Campos; Jesús Monárrez	Eduardo Magallanes
"Has vuelto al fin"	Jorge Castro	Jorge Castro; Olivia de Montelongo; Fabrizio Castro	Jorge Castro Jr.
"La cantante"	Dulce	Jorge García Castil	Carlos Guerreros
"Lo que pasó, pasó"	Yoshio	Felipe Gil	Rodrigo Álvarez
"Los dos jugamos al amor"	Alberto Ángel	Alberto Ángel	Mario Patrón
"Madre"	Alondra	Sylvia Tapia	Arturo Neri
"Manantial"	Joan Sebastian	Joan Sebastian	Jonathán Zarzosa
"María Luna"	Roberto Jordán	Sergio Quintana; José Eduardo Piña	Ricardo Toral
"Mi vieja dama"	Fernando Riba	Mario Arturo; Fernando Riba	Eduardo Magallanes
"Mírame"	Carminna	Manuel Antonio Campos; Rafael Márquez; Jonathán Zarzosa	Rodolfo "Popo" Sánchez
"Mujer"	Carlos Lara	Carlos Lara	Eduardo Magallanes
"No me conviene"	Laura Zapata	José Domingo	Julio Jaramillo
"Partiré"	Samuel	Jesús Monárrez	Lázaro Muñiz
"Por esa primavera"	Martha Eugenia	María Historia	Chilo Morán
"Por ser así"	Pepe Jara	Francisco Sahagún Baca	Chucho Ferrer
"Silencio"	Prisma	Sylvia Tapia	Sergio Andrade
"Qué bonito es despertar"	Imelda Miller	Imelda Miller	Eduardo Casanova
"¿Qué eres tú, quién eres tú?"	Olinsser	Olinsser	Armando Noriega
"¿Qué más puedo pedir?"	Gualberto Castro	Nacho Méndez	Nacho Méndez
"¿Qué va a decir?"	José Alberto Fuentes	José Alberto Fuentes	Rodolfo "Popo" Sánchez
"Sentirme tuya"	Doris	Doris Ortiz; Jonathán Zarzosa	Jonathán Zarzosa
"Sólo una sonrisa"	Fito Girón	Adolfo Girón; Adolfo Girón Jr.	Jonathán Zarzosa
"Todavía existe el amor"	Johnny Laboriel	Ernesto Juárez	Armando Noriega
"Vete"	Jorge Vargas	Víctor Cortés	Chucho Ferrer
"Vete otra vez"	Tirzo Paiz	Tirzo Paiz	Lázaro Muñiz

=== Qualifying rounds ===
The four qualifying rounds were held on Saturdays 15, 22, and 29 August, and 5 September 1981. Each round featured ten entries, and the ten highest-scoring entries among the forty competing advanced to the final. Several expert jurors present in the hall and five remote provincial juries scored all the entries in each round.

Qualifier

Result of the qualifying rounds of the National OTI Festival – Mexico 1981
R/O	Song	Artist	Points	Result
First qualifying round – 15 August 1981
1	"Flores de papel"	Manuel Adrián	65	—N/a
2	"Partiré"	Samuel	61	—N/a
3	"Los dos jugamos al amor"	Alberto Ángel	75	—N/a
4	"Mi vieja dama"	Fernando Riba	83	Qualified
5	"Silencio"	Prisma	67	—N/a
6	"Lo que pasó, pasó"	Yoshio	91	Qualified
7	"La cantante"	Dulce	76	—N/a
8	"Por ser así"	Pepe Jara	74	—N/a
9	"Qué bonito es despertar"	Imelda Miller	77	—N/a
10	"¿Qué más puedo pedir?"	Gualberto Castro	83	Qualified
Second qualifying round – 22 August 1981
1	"Dos iguales que arena y mar"	Matty Bello	65	—N/a
2	"Dímelo"	Óscar	62	—N/a
3	"Mujer"	Carlos Lara	65	—N/a
4	"No me conviene"	Laura Zapata	76	—N/a
5	"Madre"	Alondra	60	—N/a
6	"Vete otra vez"	Tirzo Paiz	54	—N/a
7	"Fuego sobre la nieve"	Arianna	79	—N/a
8	"Barato"	María del Sol	75	—N/a
9	"Todavía existe el amor"	Johnny Laboriel	81	—N/a
10	"Concierto para un amor"	María Medina	86	Qualified
Third qualifying round – 29 August 1981
1	"¿Qué eres tú, quién eres tú?"	Olinsser	66	—N/a
2	"Mírame"	Carminna	71	—N/a
3	"Sólo una sonrisa"	Fito Girón	67	—N/a
4	"Sentirme tuya"	Doris	69	—N/a
5	"María Luna"	Roberto Jordán	79	—N/a
6	"Con mi nuevo amor"	Arturo Castro	65	—N/a
7	"Aquí todo sigue igual"	Natalia Baeza	66	—N/a
8	"Cien millones de locos"	Sergio Esquivel	86	Qualified
9	"En las buenas y en las malas"	Sonia Rivas	89	Qualified
10	"Estúpido romántico"	Felipe Gil	89	Qualified
Fourth qualifying round – 5 September 1981
1	"¿Qué va a decir?"	José Alberto Fuentes	82	Qualified
2	"Busco algo más"	David Haro	81	—N/a
3	"Por esa primavera"	Martha Eugenia	70	—N/a
4	"Esta vez"	Mario Pintor	79	—N/a
5	"Vete"	Jorge Vargas	65	—N/a
6	"Canción de fe"	Ramiro José Esperanza	72	—N/a
7	"Canto mi canto"	Guadalupe Jimena	70	—N/a
8	"Has vuelto al fin"	Jorge Castro	72	—N/a
9	"Deja"	Yuri	94	Qualified
10	"Manantial"	Joan Sebastian	87	Qualified

Detailed Vote of the first qualifying round
R/O	Song	Provincial juries					Jurors in the hall	Total
R/O	Song	Saltillo	Tuxtla	Mérida	Guadalajara	Monterrey	Jurors in the hall	Total
1	"Flores de papel"	4	4	4	4	4	45	65
2	"Partiré"	4	4	3	2	4	44	61
3	"Los dos jugamos al amor"	5	6	4	5	5	50	75
4	"Mi vieja dama"	6	7	4	4	5	57	83
5	"Silencio"	4	4	3	4	5	47	67
6	"Lo que pasó, pasó"	5	5	5	5	5	66	91
7	"La cantante"	5	4	3	4	6	54	76
8	"Por ser así"	6	6	3	5	5	49	74
9	"Qué bonito es despertar"	5	7	4	3	5	53	77
10	"¿Qué más puedo pedir?"	5	4	5	4	5	60	83

Detailed Vote of the second qualifying round
R/O	Song	Provincial juries					Jurors in the hall	Total
R/O	Song	León	Mazatlán	Guadalajara	Monterrey	Mérida	Jurors in the hall	Total
1	"Dos iguales que arena y mar"	4	4	4	4	3	46	65
2	"Dímelo"	5	3	4	4	3	43	62
3	"Mujer"	4	3	6	5	4	43	65
4	"No me conviene"	5	3	5	4	4	55	76
5	"Madre"	4	3	6	5	4	38	60
6	"Vete otra vez"	3	3	4	4	3	37	54
7	"Fuego sobre la nieve"	4	4	5	5	5	56	79
8	"Barato"	3	4	5	5	3	55	75
9	"Todavía existe el amor"	6	4	6	6	5	54	81
10	"Concierto para un amor"	7	4	5	6	7	57	86

Detailed Vote of the third qualifying round
R/O	Song	Provincial juries					Jurors in the hall	Total
R/O	Song	Hermosillo	Puebla	Monterrey	Mérida	Guadalajara	Jurors in the hall	Total
1	"¿Qué eres tú, quién eres tú?"	4	3	5	5	4	45	66
2	"Mírame"	5	4	5	5	4	48	71
3	"Sólo una sonrisa"	3	3	4	3	4	50	67
4	"Sentirme tuya"	4	3	4	4	4	50	69
5	"María Luna"	5	3	4	3	5	59	79
6	"Con mi nuevo amor"	4	3	4	4	3	47	65
7	"Aquí todo sigue igual"	4	3	4	4	3	48	66
8	"Cien millones de locos"	6	4	6	4	2	64	86
9	"En las buenas y en las malas"	6	5	6	5	5	62	89
10	"Estúpido romántico"	5	3	4	6	6	65	89

Detailed Vote of the fourth qualifying round
R/O	Song	Provincial juries					Jurors in the hall	Total
R/O	Song	San Luis Potosí	Nuevo Laredo	Mérida	Guadalajara	Monterrey	Jurors in the hall	Total
1	"¿Qué va a decir?"	4	4	5	5	4	60	82
2	"Busco algo más"	5	3	3	4	4	62	81
3	"Por esa primavera"	3	3	4	4	4	52	70
4	"Esta vez"	5	4	5	5	4	56	79
5	"Vete"	3	3	3	4	4	48	65
6	"Canción de fe"	4	3	6	4	3	52	72
7	"Canto mi canto"	4	4	3	4	3	52	70
8	"Has vuelto al fin"	6	4	4	4	4	50	72
9	"Deja"	5	6	4	5	5	69	94
10	"Manantial"	6	4	3	4	4	66	87

=== Final ===
The final was held on Sunday 20 September 1981. The winner was "Lo que pasó, pasó", written by Felipe Gil, and performed by Yoshio. The festival ended with a reprise of the winning entry.

Winner

Result of the final of the National OTI Festival – Mexico 1981
R/O	Song	Artist	Votes	Result
1	"En las buenas y en las malas"	Sonia Rivas	4	2
2	"Lo que pasó, pasó"	Yoshio	5	1
3	"Manantial"	Joan Sebastian	0	—N/a
4	"Deja"	Yuri	3	3
5	"Cien millones de locos"	Sergio Esquivel	2	4
6	"¿Qué más puedo pedir?"	Gualberto Castro	1	7
7	"Estúpido romántico"	Felipe Gil	2	4
8	"Mi vieja dama"	Fernando Riba	2	4
9	"Concierto para un amor"	María Medina	1	7
10	"¿Qué va a decir?"	José Alberto Fuentes	0	—N/a

=== Merit awards ===
In the final, the jurors voted aloud for the Best Male and Female Performer, Best Musical Arrangement, and Breakout Artist among the three shortlisted artist in each category.

Yoshio received the Best Male Performer Award, Yuri the Best Female Performer Award, Rodolfo "Popo" Sánchez the Best Musical Arrangement Award for "¿Qué va a decir?", and David Haro and José Alberto Fuentes the Breakout Artist Award jointly.

Best Male Performer
Artist	Votes	Result
Johnny Laboriel	1	3
Yoshio	5	1
Gualberto Castro	4	2

Best Female Performer
Artist	Votes	Result
Dulce	3	2
María del Sol	1	3
Yuri	6	1

Best Musical Arrangement
Song	Arranger	Votes	Result
"¿Qué va a decir?"	Rodolfo "Popo" Sánchez	5	1
"Mi vieja dama"	Eduardo Magallanes	3	2
"Estúpido romántico"	Chucho Ferrer	2	3

Breakout Artist
Artist	Votes	Result
David Haro	5	1
José Alberto Fuentes	5	1
Olinsser	0	3

=== Official album ===
Las 10 finalistas del Festival OTI 81 is the official compilation album of the tenth edition of the Mexican National OTI Festival, released by RCA Victor in 1981. The vinyl LP features the studio version of the ten songs qualified for the national final.

== At the OTI Festival ==
On 5 December 1981, the OTI Festival was held at the National Auditorium in Mexico City, hosted by Televisa, and broadcast live throughout Ibero-America. Yoshio performed "Lo que pasó, pasó" in position 16, placing third with 22 points, tying with the entry from the United States, out of 21 competing entries.

=== Voting ===
Each participating broadcaster, or group of broadcasters that jointly participated representing a country, assembled a jury who awarded 5–1 points to their five favourite songs in order of preference. Janet Arceo was the spokesperson who announced the Mexican jury's vote.

Points awarded to Mexico
Score	Country
5 points	Nicaragua
4 points	Netherlands Antilles; United States
3 points	Peru; Venezuela
2 points	
1 point	Colombia; Puerto Rico; Uruguay

Points awarded by Mexico
Score	Country
5 points	Puerto Rico
4 points	Spain
3 points	Argentina
2 points	Chile
1 point	Nicaragua
