= Chile in the OTI Festival 1981 =

- OTI Festival 1981
- Participating broadcasters: Televisión Nacional de Chile (TVN); Corporación de Televisión de la Universidad Católica de Chile (UCTV); Corporación de Televisión de la Universidad de Chile (UTV)
- Country: Chile
- Selection process: National final
- Selection date: 31 October 1981

Competing entry
- Song: "Si hoy tenemos que cantar a tanta gente, pensémoslo"
- Artist: Florcita Motuda
- Songwriter: Raúl Florcita Alarcón Rojas

Placement
- Final result: 5th, 18 points

Participation chronology
◄1980 •	1981	• 1982►

Chile was represented at the OTI Festival 1981 with the song "Si hoy tenemos que cantar a tanta gente, pensémoslo", written and performed by Florcita Motuda. The Chilean participating broadcasters, Televisión Nacional de Chile (TVN), Corporación de Televisión de la Universidad Católica de Chile (UCTV), and Corporación de Televisión de la Universidad de Chile (UTV), jointly selected their entry through a televised national final. The song, that was performed in position 21, placed fifth out of 21 competing entries, tied with the entry from Colombia with 18 points. Florcita Motuda had already represented Chile in 1978.

== National stage ==
Televisión Nacional de Chile (TVN), Corporación de Televisión de la Universidad Católica de Chile (UCTV), and Corporación de Televisión de la Universidad de Chile (UTV), held a national final jointly to select their entry for the 10th edition of the OTI Festival. Twelve songs were shortlisted for the televised final.

Competing entries on the national final – Chile 1981
Song	Artist	Songwriter(s)
"Si hoy tenemos que cantar a tanta gente, pensémoslo"	Florcita Motuda	Raúl Florcita Alarcón Rojas
"Manifiesto de amor"	Gabriela	Scottie Scott
"Cada día que pasa"	Gloria Simonetti	Buddy Richard
"¿A dónde vas Mesalina?"	Patricio Renán	Osvaldo Jeldres
"O te vas o te quedas"	Patricia Maldonado	Fernando Pávez
"Abrázame"	Mónica de Calixto and Jorge Rebel	Reynaldo Tomás Martínez
"Barcelona"	Osvaldo Díaz	Willy Bascuñán
"Canción para gente común"	Óscar Andrade	Óscar Andrade
"Mucho más"	Ginette Acevedo	María Angélica Ramírez
"Con la fuerza de los dos"	María Inés Naveillán	Luis "Poncho" Venegas
"Esta canción es para ti"	Sergio Cerda	Nano Acevedo
"Tres minutos"	Cristina	Nino García

=== National final ===
The national final was held on Saturday 31 October 1981, beginning at 21:30 CLST (00:30+1 UTC), at the Holiday Inn Cordillera Hotel in Santiago, and was presented by Juan Guillermo Vivado. The show featured a guest performance by Coco Legrand. It was staged by UTV, and broadcast on TVN's Canal 7, UCTV's Canal 13, and UTV's Canal 11.

The members of the jury were: Luis Benko, Héctor de Aguirre, Raquel Argandoña, María Olga Delpiano, Reinaldo Tomás Martínez, and Miguel Zabaleta.

The winner was "Si hoy tenemos que cantar a tanta gente, pensémoslo", written and performed by Florcita Motuda; with "Canción para gente común", written and performed by Óscar Andrade, placing second; and "Cada día que pasa", written by Buddy Richard and performed by Gloria Simonetti, placing third. The first prize was endowed with a monetary amount of US$5,000, the second prize of US$3,000, and the third prize of US$2,000.

Winner

Result of the national final – Chile 1981
R/O	Song	Artist	Result
1	"Si hoy tenemos que cantar a tanta gente, pensémoslo"	Florcita Motuda	1
2	"Manifiesto de amor"	Gabriela	—N/a
3	"Cada día que pasa"	Gloria Simonetti	3
4	"¿A dónde vas Mesalina?"	Patricio Renán	—N/a
5	"O te vas o te quedas"	Patricia Maldonado	—N/a
6	"Abrázame"	Mónica de Calixto and Jorge Rebel	—N/a
7	"Barcelona"	Osvaldo Díaz	—N/a
8	"Canción para gente común"	Óscar Andrade	2
9	"Mucho más"	Ginette Acevedo	—N/a
10	"Con la fuerza de los dos"	María Inés Naveillán	—N/a
11	"Esta canción es para ti"	Sergio Cerda	—N/a
12	"Tres minutos"	Cristina	—N/a

== At the OTI Festival ==
On 5 December 1981, the OTI Festival was held at the National Auditorium in Mexico City, Mexico, hosted by Televisa, and broadcast live throughout Ibero-America. Florcita Motuda performed "Si hoy tenemos que cantar a tanta gente, pensémoslo" in last position of the 21 competing entries. At the end of the voting, the song placed 5th, with 18 points, tying with the song from Colombia.

The festival was broadcast on TVN's Canal 7, UTV's Canal 11, and UCTV's Canal 13 on delay at 21:30 CLST (00:30+1 UTC) with Juan Guillermo Vivado presenting the local opt-out.

=== Voting ===
Each participating broadcaster, or group of broadcasters that jointly participated representing a country, assembled a jury who awarded 5–1 points to their five favourite songs in order of preference.

José Alfredo Fuentes, Scottie Scott, Alicia Puccio, Homero Zamorano, and Patricio Pérez were the five members of the Chilean jury, with the latter acting as the president of the jury. However, due a communication failure with the studios in Chile during the voting, the Chilean stand-in delegate present at the festival venue, Ricardo Miranda, voted instead.

Points awarded to Chile
Score	Country
5 points	Costa Rica
4 points	
3 points	Colombia
2 points	Brazil; Mexico; Netherlands Antilles; Puerto Rico
1 point	Argentina; El Salvador

Points awarded by Chile
Score	Country
5 points	Ecuador
4 points	Peru
3 points	Honduras
2 points	Brazil
1 point	Netherlands Antilles
