= Panama in the OTI Festival =

- OTI Festival
- Participating broadcaster: RPC Televisión (RPC-TV)

Participation summary
- Appearances: 28
- First appearance: 1972
- Last appearance: 2000
- Highest placement: 2nd in 1972
- Participation history: 1972; 1973; 1974; 1975; 1976; 1977; 1978; 1979; 1980; 1981; 1982; 1983; 1984; 1985; 1986; 1987; 1988; 1989; 1990; 1991; 1992; 1993; 1994; 1995; 1996; 1997; 1998; 2000

The participation of Panama in the OTI Festival began at the first OTI Festival in 1972. The Panamanian participating broadcaster was RPC Televisión (RPC-TV), which was member of the Organización de Televisión Iberoamericana (OTI). It participated in all twenty-eight editions of the festival, and is best result was second achieved in 1972.

== History ==
Although Panama never withdrew from the event, never managed to achieve victory, although in its debut year, "Oh señor" performed by Basilio came second.

In spite of its promising start, the following participations were not as satisfactory. In 1978, Panama ended in the top 5 for the last time. From then on, its trajectory was lustreless as happened with most of the Central American countries with the exception of Nicaragua.

== Participation overview ==
Table key
| 2 | Second place |
| SF | Semi-finalist |
| ◇ | Contest cancelled |

| Year | Song | Artist | Songwriter(s) | Conductor | Place | Points |
|---|---|---|---|---|---|---|
| 1972 | "Oh señor" | Basilio | Basilio Fergus; Herrero; Armenteros | Augusto Algueró | 2 | 8 |
| 1973 | "Soy feliz" | Orlando Morales | Mary Jean Wright | Ivan Paulo | 12 | 2 |
| 1974 | "La tierra es de todos" | Orlando Morales and Marcos Rodríguez | Gee Karlshonn | Gee Karlshonn | 15 | 1 |
| 1975 | "Tú y yo" | Pablo Azael | Pablo Azael | Jack del Río | 14 | 2 |
| 1976 | "Gracias amor" | Pablo Azael | | | 8 | 3 |
| 1977 | "Canta a la vida" | Leopoldo Hernández | Leopoldo Hernández | Rafael Ibarbia | 11 | 2 |
| 1978 | "Te cantaré, yo te amaré" | Roger Barés | Roger Barés | | 5 | 18 |
| 1979 | "Sueños" | Tony Espino | Pedro Azael | Eduardo Cabrera | 13 | 12 |
| 1980 | "Puede ser" | Solinka | Simón Abadi | Alexis Castillo | 16 | 8 |
| 1981 | "Pero ayer fuiste sólo María" | Roger Barés | Pablo Azael | | 17 | 7 |
| 1982 | "Mi pueblito" | Ediza Moreno | Ediza Moreno; Toby Muñoz | Guillermo Irribarra | 14 | 11 |
| 1983 | "Recuerdos" | Betzaida | Edwin Silvera | Toby Muñoz | —N/a | |
| 1984 | "Hagamos un pacto" | Dini y Dany | Julio Chú; Simón Abadí | Toby Muñoz | —N/a | |
| 1985 | "Con las manos atadas" | Rafael Della Serra | Julio Chú; Simón Abadi | Toby Muñoz | —N/a | |
| 1986 | "Quizás no es el momento" | Paulette | Paulette Thomas | Cristobal Muñoz | —N/a | |
| 1987 | "Blanco y negro" | Olga Cecilia | Lorena Moreno; Milton Vargas | Toby Muñoz | —N/a | |
| 1988 | "Ven" | Paulette | Lorena Moreno; Wilton Vargas | Oscar Cardozo Ocampo | 14 | 0 |
| 1989 | "Era tan solo ayer" | Christian | Christian | | —N/a | |
| 1990 | "Dos amigas" | Vielka Plummer | Edwin Silvera | William Sánchez | —N/a | |
| 1991 | "Océano y gaviota" | Juan Carlos Rodríguez y Loló Ledezma | Juan Carlos Rodríguez | Chucho Ferrer | SF | —N/a |
| 1992 | "Memorias" | Eduardo Laly Carrizo | Pedro Azael | | —N/a | |
| 1993 | "Canción a mi madre" | Tony Cheng | Lali Carrizo | Edgardo Quintero | —N/a | |
| 1994 | "Mi ciudad" | Armando Valdivieso | A. Almanza; Armando Valdivieso | | SF | —N/a |
| 1995 | "Has hecho trampa" | Tony Cheng | Augusto César Esucdero | Oscar Cardozo Ocampo | —N/a | |
| 1996 | "Sin tu cielo azul" | Omar Argel Espinosa | Darío Espinosa | | —N/a | |
| 1997 | "¿De qué nos vale?" | Ricardo y Alberto | | | SF | —N/a |
| 1998 | "Por la vida" | Luis Arteaga | Rómulo Castro; Dino Luget | Álvaro Esquivel | SF | —N/a |
| 1999 | Contest cancelled ◇ | | | | | |
| 2000 | "Un mañana mejor" | Jorge Bordanea | Jorge Bordanea; Carlos Iván Zúñiga; Juan Carlos Bordanea | | SF | —N/a |
