= Panama in the OTI Festival 1980 =

- OTI Festival 1980
- Participating broadcaster: RPC Televisión (RPC-TV)
- Country: Panama
- Selection process: National OTI Festival
- Selection date: 4 October 1980

Competing entry
- Song: "Puede ser"
- Artist: Solinka
- Songwriter: Simón Abadi

Placement
- Final result: 16th, 8 points

Participation chronology
◄1979 •	1980	• 1981►

Panama was represented at the OTI Festival 1980 with the song "Puede ser", written by Simón Abadi, and performed by Solinka. The Panamanian participating broadcaster, RPC Televisión (RPC-TV), selected its entry through a televised national final. The song, that was performed in position 4, placed sixteenth out of 23 competing entries, with 8 points.

== National stage ==
RPC Televisión (RPC-TV), held a televised national final to select its entry for the 9th edition of the OTI Festival. Twelve songs were shortlisted for the televised final, out of the 155 received.

Competing entries on the national final – Panama 1980 (Note: Incomplete list of the twelve competing entries.)
Song	Artist	Songwriter(s)
"Puede ser"	Solinka	Simón Abadi

=== National final ===
RPC-TV staged the national final on Saturday 4 October 1980, beginning at 20:00 EST (01:00+1 UTC), at the National Theatre in Panama City. It was presented by Ana Raquel de Ordaz and Rogelio Pretto, and broadcast live on Canal 4. The musical director was Edgardo Quintero, who conducted the orchestra.

The winner was "Puede ser", written by Simón Abadi, and performed by Solinka. In addition, Solinka received the Best Performer Award, and "Puede ser" received the Best Musical Arrangement Award.

Winner

Result of the national final – Panama 1980
R/O	Song	Artist	Result
	"Puede ser"	Solinka	1

== At the OTI Festival ==
On 15 November 1980, the OTI Festival was held at the Martín Coronado hall of the Teatro General San Martín in Buenos Aires, Argentina, hosted by Argentina Televisora Color (ATC), and broadcast live throughout Ibero-America. Solinka performed "Puede ser" in position 4, with Alexis Castillo conducting the event's orchestra, and placing sixteenth out of 23 competing entries, with 8 points.

=== Voting ===
Each participating broadcaster assembled a jury who awarded 5–1 points to their five favourite songs in order of preference.

Points awarded to Panama
Score	Country
5 points	Chile
4 points	
3 points	Nicaragua
2 points	
1 point	

Points awarded by Panama
Score	Country
5 points	Puerto Rico
4 points	Guatemala
3 points	Nicaragua
2 points	Costa Rica
1 point	Venezuela
