= Roberto Celedón =

Chilean lawyer and politician

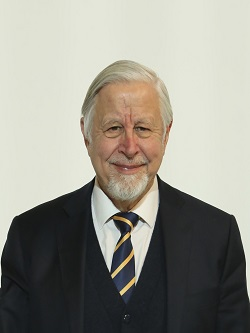

Member of the Chamber of Deputies
- Incumbent
- Assumed office 8 January 2025
- Preceded by: Mercedes Bulnes
- Constituency: District 17

Member of the Constitutional Convention
- In office 4 July 2021 – 4 July 2022
- Constituency: District 17

Personal details
- Born: 31 January 1947 (age 79) Talca, Chile
- Party: Christian Left (1971-1996)
- Spouse: Mercedes Bulnes
- Children: 10
- Education: Pontifical Catholic University of Chile (LL.B); University of Talca (LL.M)
- Occupation: Constituent
- Profession: Lawyer

Roberto Antonio Celedón Fernández (born 31 January 1947) is a Chilean human rights lawyer who was a member of the Chilean Constitutional Convention. In 2025 he was appointed as deputy after the death of his wife, Mercedes Bulnes, who served in that office.

== Early life and education ==
Celedón was born in Santiago on 31 January 1947 to Enrique Celedón and María Gabriela del Carmen Fernández. He studied law at the Pontifical Catholic University of Chile, where he also earned a master’s degree in Urban and Regional Planning. He later completed a master’s degree in Constitutional Law at the University of Talca.

== Political career ==
Celedón joined the Christian Democratic Party in 1963 and, while a law student, became involved in the Instituto de Humanismo Cristiano in 1966, a study group focused on Catholic social doctrine. In 1971, together with Rafael Agustín Gumucio, Bosco Parra, and others, he co-founded the Christian Left (Izquierda Cristiana), serving as its president from 1989 to 1992. He remained a member of the party until 1996, after which he continued his political activity as an independent.

During the dictatorship of Augusto Pinochet, he and his wife, Mercedes Bulnes, were prominent figures in the defence of human rights. In 1973, they were subjected to repression by the regime and were detained and tortured. He later worked as a human rights lawyer, including as a member of the Vicariate of Solidarity.

Following the return to democracy in 1990, he opened his first legal practice. Throughout his professional career, he has focused particularly on human rights cases and on representing trade unions and workers.

Celedón ran unsuccessfully for the Chamber of Deputies on several occasions, including in 1989, 2001, 2005, and 2009, and also stood as a candidate for mayor of Talca in 2008.

In the elections of May 2021, he was elected as a member of the Constitutional Convention representing the 17th District of the Maule Region, running as an independent on a seat allocated to the Green Regionalist Federation within the Apruebo Dignidad coalition. He received 23,468 votes, corresponding to 10.30% of the valid votes cast, making him the leading vote-getter in the district.

During the convention, he coordinated the Committee on Human Rights, Historical Truth, and the Foundations for Justice, Reparation, and Guarantees of Non-Repetition, and later served on the Committee on Fundamental Rights and the Committee on Harmonization.

Following the death of his wife, the Frente Amplio confirmed Celedón as her replacement on 19 December 2024. He formally assumed office as a member of the Chamber of Deputies on 8 January 2025 for the remainder of the 2022-2026 legislative term. In parliament, he has served on the standing committees on Social Development, Poverty Reduction and Planning, and on Human Rights and Indigenous Peoples, as well as on special investigative committees.

== Personal life ==
Celedón was married to Mercedes Bulnes for over 50 years, and they had 10 children and 24 grandchildren.

== Recognition ==
In 2022, he was awarded the Jaime Castillo Velasco Prize in recognition of his longstanding commitment to the defence of human rights.
