= Benjamín Moreno Bascur =

Chilean politician (born 1993)

Benjamín Moreno
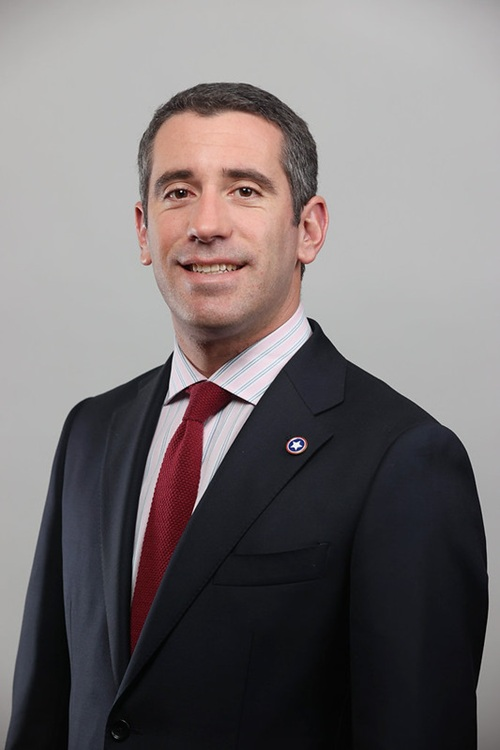
- Official portrait, 2026

Member of the Chamber of Deputies
- Incumbent
- Assumed office 11 March 2022
- Constituency: District 17

Personal details
- Born: 2 April 1993 (age 33) Santiago, Chile
- Party: Republican
- Parent(s): Cristian Moreno; Isabel Bascur
- Education: Pontifical Catholic University of Chile (LL.B)
- Occupation: Politician
- Profession: Lawyer

Benjamin Moreno Bascur (born 2 April 1993) is a Chilean agricultural engineer, and politician, member of the Republican Party. Since March 2022, he has served as a deputy of the Republic representing district No. 17 of the Maule Region, for the 2022–2026 and 2026–2030 legislative terms.

== Life and education ==
He was born in Santiago, on 2 April 1993; son of Cristián Moreno Benavente and Isabel Margarita Bascur Llona. He completed his elementary and middle school at Colegio San Isidro in the commune of Buin. He then continued his studies at the Pontifical Catholic University of Chile (PUC), a school that he represented as a rodeo rider in the National University Championship, in 2016. In June 2018 he was elected president of the National Organization of Higher Education Rodeos (Onares).

== Political career ==
He entered politics as chief of staff of the former presidential candidate, José Antonio Kast.

In 2021, he presented his candidacy for deputy for district No. 17, which includes the communes of Constitución, Curepto, Curicó, Empedrado, Hualañé, Licantén, Maule, Molina, Pelarco, Pencahue, Rauco, Río Claro, Romeral, Sagrada Familia, San Clemente, San Rafael, Talca, Teno and Vichuquén on the list of the Christian Social Front. He was elected after obtaining 16,724 votes corresponding to 6.92% of the total votes validly cast, assuming office on March 11, 2022. He is a member of the permanent commissions of National Defense and Agriculture, Forestry and Rural Development.

During the Russo-Ukrainian War, the deputy supported Ukraine by visiting the country in May 2022 along with Rojo Edwards and Cristián Araya.
