= Chile in the OTI Festival 1980 =

- OTI Festival 1980
- Participating broadcasters: Televisión Nacional de Chile (TVN); Corporación de Televisión de la Universidad Católica de Chile (UCTV); Corporación de Televisión de la Universidad de Chile (UTV)
- Country: Chile
- Selection process: National final
- Selection date: 13 October 1980

Competing entry
- Song: "Sin razón"
- Artist: Nino García
- Songwriter: Nino García

Placement
- Final result: 14th, 9 points

Participation chronology
◄1979 •	1980	• 1981►

Chile was represented at the OTI Festival 1980 with the song "Sin razón", written and performed by Nino García. The Chilean participating broadcasters, Televisión Nacional de Chile (TVN), Corporación de Televisión de la Universidad Católica de Chile (UCTV), and Corporación de Televisión de la Universidad de Chile (UTV), jointly selected their entry through a televised national final. The song, that was performed in position 1, placed 14th out of 23 competing entries, tied with the entry from Portugal with 9 points.

== National stage ==
Televisión Nacional de Chile (TVN), Corporación de Televisión de la Universidad Católica de Chile (UCTV), and Corporación de Televisión de la Universidad de Chile (UTV), held a national final jointly to select their entry for the 9th edition of the OTI Festival. Seven songs were shortlisted for the televised final.

Competing entries on the national final – Chile 1980
Song	Artist	Songwriter(s)
"El muchacho del tren"	Capri	Osvaldo Leiva
"El titiritero"	Héctor Molina	Nano Acevedo
"Fundamental"	Carolina Tocornal	Scottie Scott
"La canasta"	Osvaldo Díaz	Ricardo de la Fuente
"Marisol Giraud"	Fernando Ubiergo	Fernando Ubiergo
"Para este amor"	Gloria Simonetti	María Angélica Ramírez
"Sin razón"	Nino García	Nino García

=== National final ===
The national final was held on Monday 13 October 1980, beginning at 21:30 CLST (00:30+1 UTC), at the Municipal Theatre in Santiago, and was presented by Raúl Matas. Each of the competing performances was pre-recorded in a different location within the building. It was broadcast on TVN's Canal 7, UCTV's Canal 13, and UTV's Canal 11.

The members of the jury were: Franz Benko, José Goles, Benjamín Mackenna, Stefan Tertz, and Ítalo Passalacqua.

The winner was "Sin razón", written and performed by Nino García. The song, that tied with 23 points with "Para este amor", written by María Angélica Ramírez and performed by Gloria Simonetti, won after the tie-breaking vote.

Winner

Result of the national final – Chile 1980
R/O	Song	Artist	Points	Result
1	"El muchacho del tren"	Capri	22	3
2	"La canasta"	Osvaldo Díaz	14	6
3	"El titiritero"	Héctor Molina	15	4
4	"Fundamental"	Carolina Tocornal	15	4
5	"Para este amor"	Gloria Simonetti	23	2
6	"Marisol Giraud"	Fernando Ubiergo	13	7
7	"Sin razón"	Nino García	23	1

Detailed vote of the national final – Chile 1980
R/O	Song	Benjamín Mackenna	José Goles	Stefan Tertz	Ítalo Passalacqua	Franz Benko	Total
1	"El muchacho del tren"	4	4	5	4	5	22
2	"La canasta"	3	2	2	3	4	14
3	"El titiritero"	2	3	3	3	4	15
4	"Fundamental"	2	3	3	3	4	15
5	"Para este amor"	4	5	4	5	5	23
6	"Marisol Giraud"	2	2	3	3	3	13
7	"Sin razón"	4	5	5	4	5	23

== At the OTI Festival ==
On 15 November 1980, the OTI Festival was held at the Martín Coronado hall of the Teatro General San Martín in Buenos Aires, Argentina, hosted by Argentina Televisora Color, and broadcast live throughout Ibero-America. Nino García performed "Sin razón" in position 1, with Gonzalo García conducting the event's orchestra, placing 14th out of 23 competing entries, tying with the entry from Portugal with 9 points.

The festival was broadcast on TVN's Canal 7, UCTV's Canal 13, UTV's Canal 11, and Radio La Clave.

=== Voting ===
Each participating broadcaster, or group of broadcasters that jointly participated representing a country, assembled a jury who awarded 5–1 points to their five favourite songs in order of preference.

Points awarded to Chile
Score	Country
5 points	
4 points	Mexico
3 points	Venezuela
2 points	
1 point	Ecuador; Guatemala

Points awarded by Chile
Score	Country
5 points	Panama
4 points	Puerto Rico
3 points	Spain
2 points	Uruguay
1 point	Colombia
