= United States in the OTI Festival 1981 =

- OTI Festival 1981
- Participating broadcaster: Spanish International Network (SIN)
- Country: United States
- Selection process: IV Festival de la Canción OTI–USA
- Selection date: 10 October 1981

Competing entry
- Song: "Cuando fuiste mujer"
- Artist: Aldo Matta
- Songwriters: Vilma Planas; Héctor Garrido

Placement
- Final result: 3rd, 22 points

Participation chronology
◄1980 •	1981	• 1982►

The United States was represented at the OTI Festival 1981 with the song "Cuando fuiste mujer", written by Vilma Planas and Héctor Garrido, and performed by Aldo Matta. The participating broadcaster representing the country, the Spanish International Network (SIN), selected its entry through a national televised competition. The song, that was performed in position 6, placed third with 22 points, tying with the entry from Mexico, out of 21 competing entries.

== National stage ==
The Spanish International Network (SIN) held a national televised competition to select its entry for the 10th edition of the OTI Festival. This was the fourth edition of the Festival de la Canción OTI–USA. In the final, each song represented a SIN affiliate, each of which had selected its entry through a local pre-selection.

=== Los Angeles pre-selection ===
On Sunday 30 August 1981, KMEX-TV held a televised pre-selection at the Grand Theatre of the Los Angeles Trade–Technical College in Los Angeles, beginning at 21:30 PDT (04:30+1 UTC). This third edition of the Los Angeles Local OTI Festival featured ten songs, shortlisted from 410 received. It was presented by Eduardo Quezada and Sonia Vorhauer, and broadcast live on Channel 34. The show featured a guest performance by Isela Sotelo, the previous year's winner.

The jury was composed of Mario Alberto Millar, Elisabeth Waldo, Erich Bulling, Lupita Morán, Dinorah Pérez, Teresa Medina, and Paco Calderón as chairperson. The president of the jury only decided in the event of a tie, the rest of the jurors scored each song between 1 and 5 points.

The winner, and therefore qualified for the national final, was "Demasiado", written and performed by Guillermo Fernández.

Qualifier

Result of the Local OTI Festival – Los Angeles 1981 (Note: Incomplete list of the competing entries.)
R/O	Song	Artist	Songwriter(s)	Points	Result
	"Demasiado"	Guillermo Fernández	Guillermo Fernández		Qualified
	"Tal como eres"	Carla	Carla		2
	"Te quiero decir"	Hugo Enrique		18	
	"A dónde irás tú"	Ramón Pecina	Ricardo Martel		5
	"De frente a frente"	Xavier Zaragoza			5
	"No hay amor en cada esquina"	José María Lobo		13	
	"El tiempo de rosas"	Carlos Alejandro			8
	"Domingo a domingo"	Trinity			9
	"Mejor vete ya"	Kissy			10

=== Final ===
The final was held on Saturday 10 October 1981 at the Fontainebleau Hilton Hotel in Miami Beach, beginning at 20:00 EDT (00:00+1 UTC), and featuring eight songs. It was presented by Omar Marchant and Viviana Nunes, and broadcast live on all SIN affiliates and on FM 92. The show featured guest performances by Iva Zanicchi, Luis Aguilé, and previous year's winner Rammiro Velasco.

Each of the eight competing SIN affiliates assembled a jury that awarded their favorite entries, except their own, between 1 and 5 points in order of preference.

The winner was "Cuando fuiste mujer" representing WXTV–New York, written by Vilma Planas and Héctor Garrido, and performed by Aldo Matta; with "Demasiado" representing KMEX-TV–Los Angeles, written and performed by Guillermo Fernández, placing second; and "El cancionero" representing KWEX-TV–San Antonio, written and performed by Sergio Ruiz, placing third. The festival ended with a reprise of the winning entry.

Winner

Result of the final of the IV Festival de la Canción OTI–USA
R/O	Song	Artist	Songwriter(s)	Affiliate	Points	Result
1	"Permíteme un consejo"	Luis de Neri	Luis de Neri	KDTV–San Francisco	11	5
2	"El cancionero"	Sergio Ruiz	Sergio Ruiz	KWEX-TV–San Antonio	21	3
3	"Demasiado"	Guillermo Fernández	Guillermo Fernández	KMEX-TV–Los Angeles	23	2
4	"Cuando fuiste mujer"	Aldo Matta	Vilma Planas; Héctor Garrido	WXTV–New York	32	1
5	"Te ayudaré"	Ramón Pecina	Fernando Figueroa	KFTV–Fresno	5	8
6	"Así quisiera ser yo"	José "Palomo" Abarca	José "Palomo" Abarca	WCIU–Chicago	7	6
7	"Dale tiempo al tiempo"	Nattacha Amador	Pedro Tamayo	WLTV–Miami	15	4
8	"¿Serán ideas?"	Juan Alejandro Rodríguez and José Manuel Sandoval	Juan Alejandro Rodríguez	KCSO–Modesto	6	7

== At the OTI Festival ==
On 5 December 1981, the OTI Festival was held at the National Auditorium in Mexico City, Mexico, hosted by Televisa, and broadcast live throughout Ibero-America. Aldo Matta performed "Cuando fuiste mujer" in position 6, with Héctor Garrido conducting the event's orchestra, and placing third with 22 points, tying with the entry from Mexico, out of 21 competing entries.

=== Voting ===
Each participating broadcaster assembled a jury who awarded 5–1 points to their five favourite songs in order of preference.

Points awarded to the United States
Score	Country
5 points	Netherlands Antilles; Panama
4 points	Brazil; Puerto Rico; Spain
3 points	
2 points	
1 point	

Points awarded by the United States
Score	Country
5 points	Colombia
4 points	Mexico
3 points	Argentina
2 points	Spain
1 point	Venezuela
