= Florcita Motuda =

Chilean politician and musician

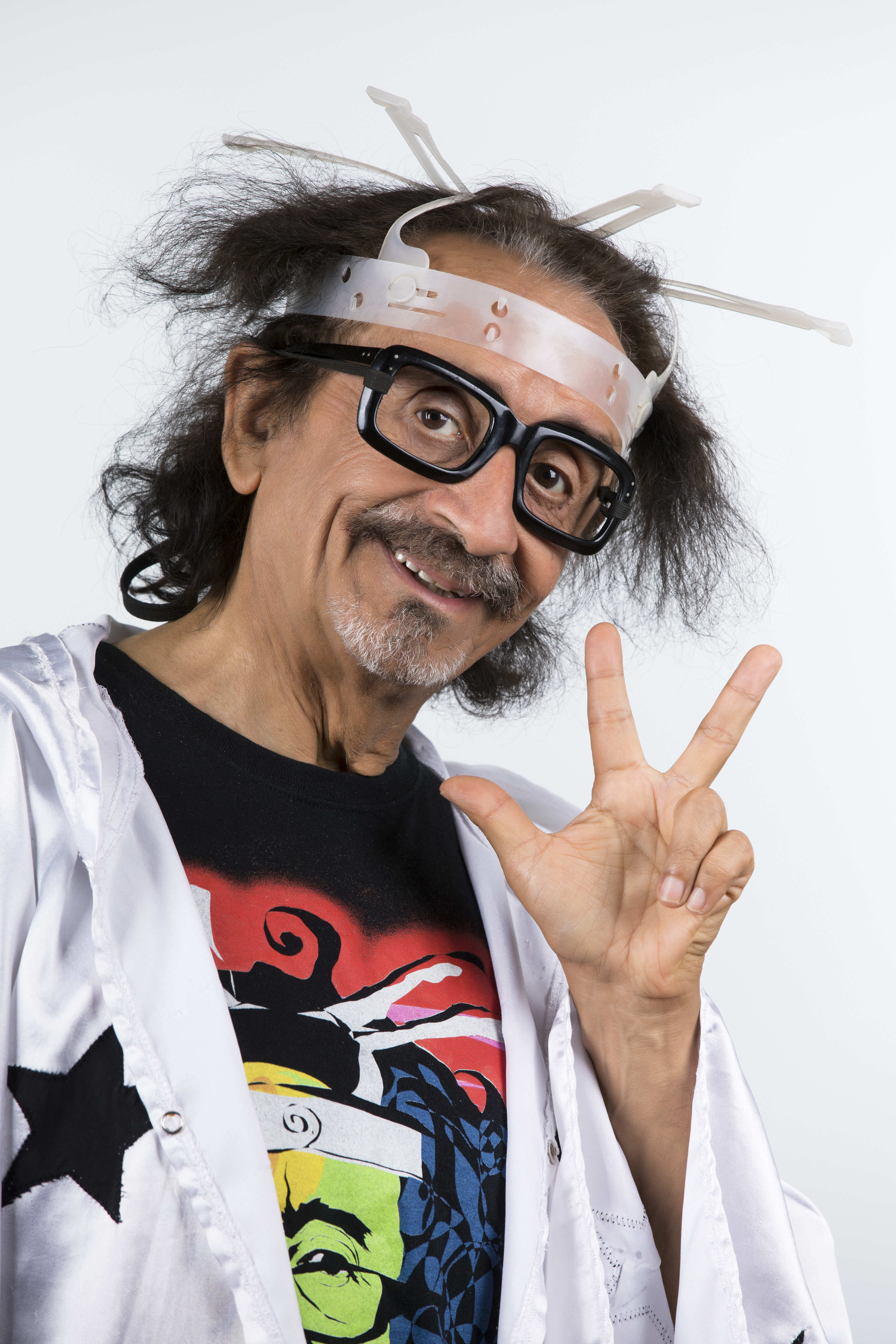
- Born: Raúl Florcita Alarcón Rojas; 15 October 1945 (age 80); Curicó, Chile
- Education: University of Chile
- Political party: Humanist Party of Chile (1984–2021)
- Movement: Broad Front
- Parents: José Raúl Alarcón (father); Elsa Rojas Aliste (mother)

Raúl Florcita Alarcón Rojas (born 15 October 1945), popularly known as Florcita Motuda, is a Chilean musician and politician. He served as National Deputy in the Chamber of Deputies between March 2018 and March 2022, representing district 17. He was one of the most historical members of the Humanist Party. He is well known for his flamboyant style for clothing and musical work, even when serving as Deputy.

He was part of numerous festivals, like Festival of Viña del Mar, Lollapalooza Chile and OTI Festival.

== Biography ==
He was born in the city of Curicó, in the Maule region, in central Chile, to José Raúl Alarcón and Elsa Eliana Rojas Aliste on the 15th of October, 1945. He lived in a small nearby town, La Huerta de Mataquito, with his two parents and his aunts. At the age of 11, his father (an ex-laborer) died, as he himself points out, affected by meningitis caused by a tooth cavity.

He has been married three times: first to the Bolivian Sandy Pérez, then to Loreto Campos, and, later on, to Sara Campos. He has two children: Francisca Olivia Florcita de la Paz, also a musician, with a degree in music and a drummer for Golem; and Lucas Merlín Alarcón Campos.

=== Musical career ===
He came to Santiago to study at the National Conservatory of Music of the University of Chile, where he formed the band Los Stéreos and later Los Sonny's. He worked in the permanent orchestra of the Saturday television program Sábados Gigantes, conducted by Mario Kreutzberger, Don Francisco.

At the time, he contacted with the Humanist movement and actively participated in it. There he assumed the doctrine of New Humanism. He created a character to overcome his obstacles in his relationship with the opposite sex and to make room for his artistic expression: "Florcita Motuda", which, according to Alarcón, reflects his blossoming to life. He worked as a music teacher in schools in Santiago.

In the 1970s he began to participate in television programs as a leading character. In 1977 he participated in the Viña del Mar Festival with the song "Brevemente... Gente (Del Espacio...)", with which he obtained the Best Performer award. The following year he won the Chilean national selection for the OTI Festival with "Pobrecito mortal, si quieres ver menos televisión, descubrirás que aburrido estarás por la tarde" and went to represent Chile in the OTI Festival 1978, placing seventh.

In 1981, he would win again the Chilean national selection for the OTI Festival with the song "Si hoy tenemos que cantar a tanta gente, pensémoslo" and paced fifth in the OTI Festival 1981.

During the 90s he was considered a cult artist and a reference for the new generations of rock musicians. He participated in various workshops and music schools as a Creativity teacher.

In 1998, he participated for the third time in the OTI Festival 1998, obtaining not just the love and support from the public, but the honor of first place with the theme "Fin de siglo, éste es el tiempo de inflamarse, deprimirse o transformarse", being the second Chilean to win this contest, after Fernando Ubiergo in 1984.

In 2005 he also participated in the TVN program Rojo VIP, where he got third place.

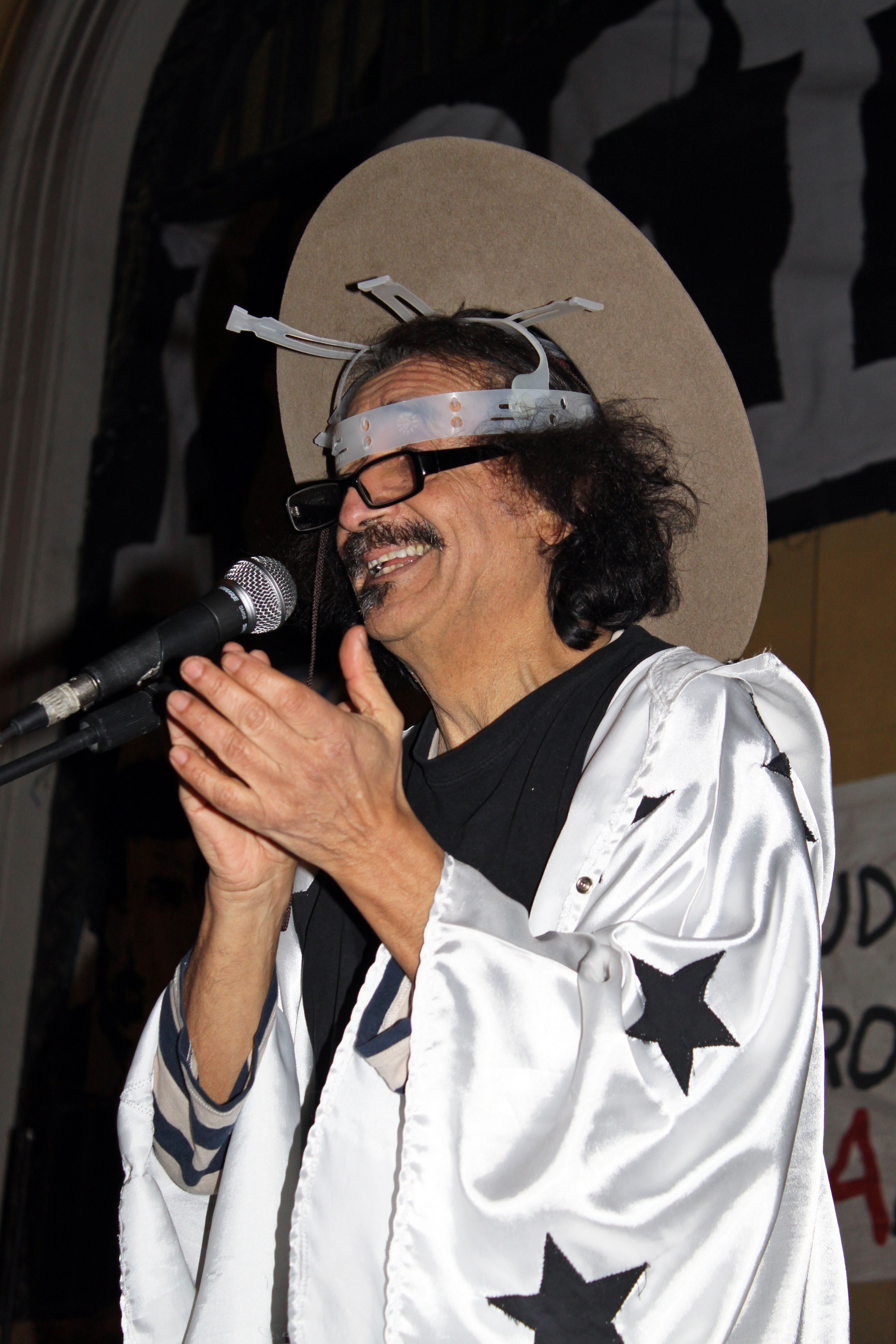
Florcita Motuda in 2011 with his characteristic cape and antennae.

=== Political career ===
He was one of the founders of the Humanist Party. He actively participated in television programs as a representative of Humanism and of the opposition to the military dictatorship. This was reflected in his musical career, as he released a cassette titled La Fiesta del NO!!!, in reference to the "NO" option during the national plebescite of 1988.

In 1999, he actively participated in the presidential campaign of Tomás Hirsch, and in 2004 he again contributed his creativity to the municipal campaign of the Juntos Podemos pact. In 2005 he was registered as a candidate for deputy for the Humanist Party in Florida, Santiago, also within the Juntos Podemos pact.

In the 2017 parliamentary elections, he was elected deputy for District 17. Alarcón attended his first day as a legislator in the Chilean Congress dressed in his white cape with moons and black stars, in addition to the antennas on his head. The musician used his "gala" suit to attend the Plenary of Congress and the start of the new legislature, where his wardrobe did not go unnoticed by the cameras and television. He justified his decision by saying: "Imagine if I arrived dressed in a suit and tie, what would the headline be? I haven't even paid them and they already bought it bought it. It's a politically necessary fact; it also represents the diversity that our country has".

In January 2021, after being accused of sexual harassment, he resigned from the Humanist Party. His term ended in March 2022.
