= United States in the OTI Festival 1980 =

- OTI Festival 1980
- Participating broadcaster: Spanish International Network (SIN)
- Country: United States
- Selection process: III Festival de la Canción OTI–USA
- Selection date: 11 October 1980

Competing entry
- Song: "El extranjero"
- Artist: Rammiro Velasco
- Songwriter: Rammiro Velasco

Placement
- Final result: 13th, 11 points

Participation chronology
◄1979 •	1980	• 1981►

The United States was represented at the OTI Festival 1980 with the song "El extranjero", written and performed by Rammiro Velasco. The participating broadcaster representing the country, the Spanish International Network (SIN), selected its entry through a national televised competition. The song, that was performed in position 9, placed thirteenth with 11 points, out of 23 competing entries.

== National stage ==
The Spanish International Network (SIN) held a national televised competition to select its entry for the 9th edition of the OTI Festival. This was the third edition of the Festival de la Canción OTI–USA. In the final, each song represented a SIN affiliate, each of which had selected its entry through a local pre-selection.

=== Los Angeles pre-selection ===
On Sunday 21 September 1980, KMEX-TV held a televised pre-selection at its studios in Los Angeles, beginning at 21:30 PDT (04:30+1 UTC). This second edition of the Los Angeles Local OTI Festival featured ten songs. It was broadcast live on Channel 34.

The jury was composed of Laurindo Almeida, Mario Alberto Milar, Rosemary Manjarez, and Pepe Rolón as chairperson.

The winner, and therefore qualified for the national final, was "Esta vez", written by Steve Rawitz and performed by Isela Sotelo.

Qualifier

Result of the Local OTI Festival – Los Angeles 1980
R/O	Song	Artist	Songwriter(s)	Result
1	"He vuelto a casa"	Ricardo Rosendo Fernández	Ricardo Rosendo Fernández	
2	"El tiempo lo curará"	Ernesto Peraza Sánchez	Ernesto Peraza Sánchez	
3	"Querer la paz"	Juan Guillermo Aguirre "Santiago"	Juan Guillermo Aguirre "Santiago"	
4	"Principio y final"	Fredy Tovar	Luis Muñoz	
5	"Desde donde llegaste"	Memo de Anda	Memo de Anda	
6	"Felicidad"	Enrique Roberto Rivas "Bobby"	Enrique Roberto Rivas "Bobby"	
7	"El acto final"	Kissy	Roberto Stuart	
8	"Voy a robarle tiempo al tiempo"	Lorgio Coimbra	Lorgio Coimbra	
9	"Cuando mueras, hombre"	Juan de la Cruz	Arturo de la Parra	
10	"Esta vez"	Isela Sotelo	Steve Rawitz	Qualified

=== Central California pre-selection ===
On Sunday 21 September 1980, KFTV also held a televised pre-selection at the KMEX-TV studios in Los Angeles. This third edition of the Central California Local OTI Festival featured three songs. It was held on the same show as the Los Angeles pre-selection, and used the same jury. It was broadcast live on Channel 21.

The winner, and therefore qualified for the national final, was "Tú eres mi canción", written by Miguel Mendoza and performed by Martha del Mar.

Result of the Local OTI Festival – Central California 1980
R/O	Song	Artist	Songwriter(s)	Result
1	"Canto a la mujer"	Armando Aranda	Armando Aranda	
2	"Tú eres mi canción"	Martha del Mar	Miguel Mendoza	Qualified
3	"Eres"	Jesús Méndez	José Jacinto	

=== New York pre-selection ===
WXTV held a pre-selection. This was the second edition of the New York Local OTI Festival.

The winner, and therefore qualified for the national final, was "El lado puro del amor", written and performed by Carmen Iraida Colón; with "Ámame", written by Vilma Planas and performed by Aldo Matta, placing second; and "Amante sin permiso", written by Roberto Lozano and performed by Georgia Gálvez, placing third.

Result of the Local OTI Festival – New York 1980 (Note: Incomplete list of the competing entries.)
R/O	Song	Artist	Songwriter(s)	Result
	"El lado puro del amor"	Carmen Iraida Colón	Carmen Iraida Colón	Qualified
	"Ámame"	Aldo Matta	Vilma Planas	2
	"Amante sin permiso"	Georgia Gálvez	Roberto Lozano	3

=== San Francisco pre-selection ===
KDTV held a pre-selection. The winner, and therefore qualified for the national final, was "Quiero ser", written by Jesús Estrada and performed by Thelma Aragón.

Result of the Local OTI Festival – San Francisco 1980
R/O	Song	Artist	Songwriter(s)	Result
	"Quiero ser"	Thelma Aragón	Jesús Estrada	Qualified

=== Northern California pre-selection ===
KLOC-TV held a pre-selection. The winner, and therefore qualified for the national final, was "La mujer del cantante", written by Rodolfo Flores and performed by Brenda Thomas.

Result of the Local OTI Festival – Northern California 1980
R/O	Song	Artist	Songwriter(s)	Result
	"La mujer del cantante"	Brenda Thomas	Rodolfo Flores	Qualified

=== Chicago pre-selection ===
WCIU-TV held a pre-selection. The winner, and therefore qualified for the national final, was "Con los pies en la tierra", written and performed by Fernando "Palomo" Abarca.

Result of the Local OTI Festival – Chicago 1980
R/O	Song	Artist	Songwriter(s)	Result
	"Con los pies en la tierra"	Fernando "Palomo" Abarca	Fernando "Palomo" Abarca	Qualified

=== Miami pre-selection ===
WLTV held a pre-selection. The winner, and therefore qualified for the national final, was "El extranjero", written and performed by Rammiro Velasco.

Result of the Local OTI Festival – Miami 1980
R/O	Song	Artist	Songwriter(s)	Result
	"El extranjero"	Rammiro Velasco	Rammiro Velasco	Qualified

=== Final ===
The final was held on Saturday 11 October 1980 in Miami, featuring ten songs. It was broadcast live on all SIN affiliates. The winner was "El extranjero" representing WLTV–Miami, written and performed by Rammiro Velasco.

Winner

Result of the final of the III Festival de la Canción OTI–USA
R/O	Song	Artist	Affiliate	Result
1	"Tú por tu lado y yo por el mío"			
2	"La música"		KWEX-TV–San Antonio	
3	"Con los pies en la tierra"	Fernando "Palomo" Abarca	WCIU-TV–Chicago	
4	"El lado puro del amor"	Carmen Iraida Colón	WXTV–New York	
5	"La magia del corazón"			
6	"Quiero ser"	Thelma Aragón	KDTV–San Francisco	
7	"Esta vez"	Isela Sotelo	KMEX-TV–Los Angeles	
8	"El extranjero"	Rammiro Velasco	WLTV–Miami	1
9	"Tú eres mi canción"	Martha del Mar	KFTV–Fresno	
10	"La mujer del cantante"	Brenda Thomas	KLOC-TV–Sacramento	

== At the OTI Festival ==
On 15 November 1980, the OTI Festival was held at the Martín Coronado hall of the Teatro General San Martín in Buenos Aires, Argentina, hosted by Argentina Televisora Color (ATC), and broadcast live throughout Ibero-America. Rammiro Velasco performed "El extranjero" in position 9, with Tony Ramírez conducting the event's orchestra, and placing thirteenth with 11 points, out of 23 competing entries.

=== Voting ===
Each participating broadcaster assembled a jury who awarded 5–1 points to their five favourite songs in order of preference.

Points awarded to the United States
Score	Country
5 points	
4 points	Dominican Republic; Portugal
3 points	
2 points	Spain
1 point	Peru

Points awarded by the United States
Score	Country
5 points	Guatemala
4 points	Spain
3 points	Puerto Rico
2 points	Dominican Republic
1 point	Mexico
