= District 17 (Chamber of Deputies of Chile) =

Electoral district of the Chamber of Deputies of Chile

- Distrito 17
- Electoral District for the Chamber of Deputies
- Location of District 17 within Chile
- Province: List: Curicó; Talca
- Region: Maule
- Population: 701,649 (2017)
- Electorate: 584,628 (2021)
- Area: 17,224 km^{2} (2020)

Current Electoral District
- Created: 2017
- Seats: 7 (2017–present)
- Deputies: List: Roberto Celedón (Ind); Felipe Donoso (UDI); Jorge Guzmán (EVO); Benjamín Moreno (REP); Francisco Pulgar (Ind); Hugo Rey (RN); Alexis Sepúlveda (PR)

District 17 (Spanish: Distrito 17) is one of the 28 multi-member electoral districts of the Chamber of Deputies, the lower house of the National Congress, the national legislature of Chile. The district was created by the 2015 electoral reform and came into being at the following general election in 2017. It consists of the provinces of Curicó and Talca in the region of Maule. The district currently elects seven of the 155 members of the Chamber of Deputies using the open party-list proportional representation electoral system. At the 2021 general election the district had 584,628 registered electors.

== Electoral system ==
District 17 currently elects seven of the 155 members of the Chamber of Deputies using the open party-list proportional representation electoral system. Parties may form electoral pacts with each other to pool their votes and increase their chances of winning seats. However, the number of candidates nominated by an electoral pact may not exceed the maximum number of candidates that a single party may nominate. Seats are allocated using the D'Hondt method.

== Election results ==
=== Summary ===
Election	Apruebo Dignidad AD / FA			Green Ecologists PEV			Dignidad Ahora DA			New Social Pact NPS / NM			Democratic Convergence CD			Chile Vamos Podemos / Vamos			Party of the People PDG			Christian Social Front FSC		
Election	Votes	%	Seats	Votes	%	Seats	Votes	%	Seats	Votes	%	Seats	Votes	%	Seats	Votes	%	Seats	Votes	%	Seats	Votes	%	Seats
2021	33,059	13.68%	1	0	0.00%	0	18,103	7.49%	0	39,689	16.42%	1				66,151	27.38%	3	20,864	8.63%	0	34,935	14.46%	1
2017	25,702	10.52%	1							50,817	20.80%	1	36,123	14.78%	1	111,857	45.78%	4						

=== Detailed ===
==== 2021 ====
Results of the 2021 general election held on 21 November 2021:

Party		Pact	Party					Pact		
Party		Pact	Votes per province		Total votes	%	Seats	Votes	%	Seats
Party		Pact	Curicó	Talca	Total votes	%	Seats	Votes	%	Seats
National Renewal	RN	Chile Podemos +	15,695	10,425	26,120	10.81%	1	66,151	27.38%	3
Independent Democratic Union	UDI	Chile Podemos +	7,740	14,318	22,058	9.13%	1	66,151	27.38%	3
Evópoli	EVO	Chile Podemos +	6,440	11,533	17,973	7.44%	1	66,151	27.38%	3
Radical Party of Chile	PR	New Social Pact	2,503	13,033	15,536	6.43%	1	39,689	16.42%	1
Christian Democratic Party	PDC	New Social Pact	6,187	5,240	11,427	4.73%	0	39,689	16.42%	1
Socialist Party of Chile	PS	New Social Pact	4,253	3,931	8,184	3.39%	0	39,689	16.42%	1
Citizens	CIU	New Social Pact	922	3,620	4,542	1.88%	0	39,689	16.42%	1
Republican Party	REP	Christian Social Front	14,336	20,599	34,935	14.46%	1	34,935	14.46%	1
Democratic Revolution	RD	Apruebo Dignidad	3,548	9,866	13,414	5.55%	1	33,059	13.68%	1
Social Green Regionalist Federation	FREVS	Apruebo Dignidad	4,063	6,671	10,734	4.44%	0	33,059	13.68%	1
Communist Party of Chile	PC	Apruebo Dignidad	2,796	6,115	8,911	3.69%	0	33,059	13.68%	1
United Centre	CU	United Independents	12,175	16,666	28,841	11.94%	1	28,841	11.94%	1
Party of the People	PDG		8,379	12,485	20,864	8.63%	0	20,864	8.63%	0
Humanist Party	PH	Dignidad Ahora	9,430	4,136	13,566	5.61%	0	18,103	7.49%	0
Equality Party	IGUAL	Dignidad Ahora	1,908	2,629	4,537	1.88%	0	18,103	7.49%	0
Valid votes			100,375	141,267	241,642	100.00%	7	241,642	100.00%	7
Blank votes			8,889	11,179	20,068	7.23%				
Rejected votes – other			6,666	9,314	15,980	5.75%				
Total polled			115,930	161,760	277,690	47.50%				
Registered electors			245,535	339,093	584,628					
Turnout			47.22%	47.70%	47.50%					

The following candidates were elected: Mercedes Bulnes (RD), 8,441 votes; Felipe Donoso (UDI), 11,767 votes; Jorge Guzmán (EVO), 12,701 votes; Benjamín Moreno (REP), 16,724 votes; Francisco Pulgar (CU), 23,066 votes; Hugo Rey (RN), 17,736 votes; and Alexis Sepúlveda (PR), 14,043 votes.

Substitutions:

- Mercedes Bulnes (RD) died on 22 November 2024. She was replaced by Roberto Celedón on 8 January 2025.

==== 2017 ====
Results of the 2017 general election held on 19 November 2017:

Party		Pact	Party					Pact		
Party		Pact	Votes per province		Total votes	%	Seats	Votes	%	Seats
Party		Pact	Curicó	Talca	Total votes	%	Seats	Votes	%	Seats
Independent Democratic Union	UDI	Chile Vamos	23,317	36,351	59,668	24.42%	2	111,857	45.78%	4
National Renewal	RN	Chile Vamos	21,795	24,443	46,238	18.92%	2	111,857	45.78%	4
Evópoli	EVO	Chile Vamos	469	5,482	5,951	2.44%	0	111,857	45.78%	4
Social Democrat Radical Party	PRSD	Nueva Mayoría	4,432	16,989	21,421	8.77%	1	50,817	20.80%	1
Socialist Party of Chile	PS	Nueva Mayoría	14,062	7,074	21,136	8.65%	0	50,817	20.80%	1
Party for Democracy	PPD	Nueva Mayoría	2,737	5,523	8,260	3.38%	0	50,817	20.80%	1
Humanist Party	PH	Broad Front	4,614	6,239	10,853	4.44%	1	25,702	10.52%	1
Democratic Revolution	RD	Broad Front	4,165	4,239	8,404	3.44%	0	25,702	10.52%	1
Liberal Party of Chile	PL	Broad Front	3,094	3,351	6,445	2.64%	0	25,702	10.52%	1
Christian Democratic Party	PDC	Democratic Convergence	14,905	20,433	35,338	14.46%	1	36,123	14.78%	1
Citizen Left	IC	Democratic Convergence	396	389	785	0.32%	0	36,123	14.78%	1
País	PAIS	All Over Chile	4,880	5,211	10,091	4.13%	0	10,916	4.47%	0
Progressive Party	PRO	All Over Chile	483	342	825	0.34%	0	10,916	4.47%	0
Citizens	CIU		3,075	5,851	8,926	3.65%	0	8,926	3.65%	0
Valid votes			102,424	141,917	244,341	100.00%	7	244,341	100.00%	7
Blank votes			7,740	9,555	17,295	6.31%				
Rejected votes – other			5,771	6,485	12,256	4.47%				
Total polled			115,935	157,957	273,892	49.36%				
Registered electors			233,453	321,406	554,859					
Turnout			49.66%	49.15%	49.36%					

The following candidates were elected: Pedro Álvarez-Salamanca (UDI), 20,541 votes; Pablo Lorenzini (PDC), 19,884 votes; Celso Morales (UDI), 22,089 votes; Florcita Motuda (PH), 6,482 votes; Pablo Prieto (RN), 14,338 votes; Hugo Rey (RN), 20,517 votes; and Alexis Sepúlveda (PRSD), 18,390 votes.
