= Mercedes Bulnes =

Chilean lawyer and politician (1950–2024)

María Mercedes Bulnes Núñez
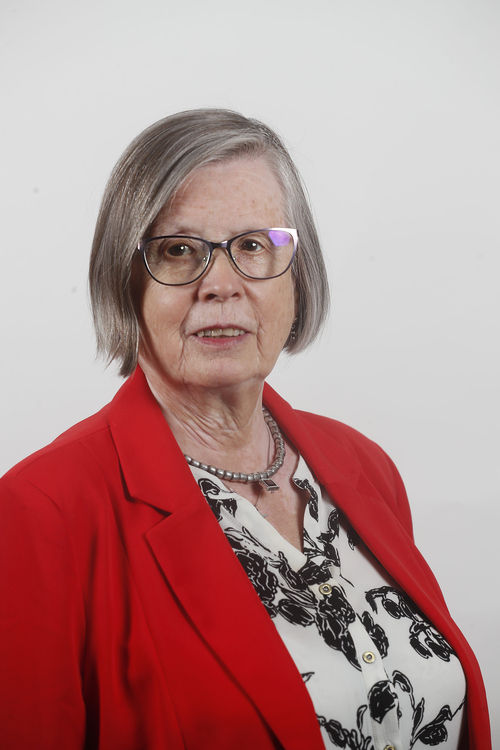
- Bulnes in 2022

Member of the Chamber of Deputies of Chile
- In office 11 March 2022 – 22 November 2024
- Constituency: 17th District (Maule Region)

Personal details
- Born: June 6, 1950 Valdivia, Chile
- Died: November 22, 2024 (aged 74) Santiago, Chile
- Party: Independent
- Spouse: Roberto Celedón Fernández
- Children: 10
- Education: Complutense University of Madrid

María Mercedes Bulnes Núñez (6 June 1950, Valdivia – 22 November 2024, Santiago) was a Chilean lawyer, human rights advocate, and independent politician. She served as a member of the Chamber of Deputies of Chile for the 17th District of the Maule Region from 2022 until her death.

Before entering parliament, Bulnes was widely known for her work as a human rights lawyer during and after the military dictatorship of Augusto Pinochet, as well as for her legal advocacy on behalf of victims of sexual violence. As a legislator, she focused on human rights, social justice, and the protection of victims within the criminal justice system.

== Early life and education ==
Bulnes was born in Valdivia on 6 June 1950 to Gonzalo Bulnes Aldunate and Luz Adriana Núñez Meyer. During the dictatorship of Augusto Pinochet, she and her husband, Roberto Celedón Fernández, were prominent figures in the defence of human rights. In 1973, they were subjected to repression by the regime and were detained and tortured, including during a period when Bulnes was pregnant with her third child.

Following a period of political exile in the Netherlands, Bulnes pursued legal studies at the Complutense University of Madrid, graduating on 8 December 1983. After returning to Chile, she revalidated her law degree on 12 July 1985 in order to practise as a lawyer in the country. She subsequently settled in Talca, where she worked to defend those persecuted by the dictatorship of Pinochet.

In the 1990s, Bulnes and her husband opened a law firm dedicated to providing legal assistance to individuals who lacked access to justice due to limited financial resources. She later also practised law in Santiago, working alongside her husband and one of her sons.

== Legal work and advocacy ==
Before assuming public office, Bulnes worked as a human rights lawyer and represented victims of sexual violence. She acted as counsel for one of the complainants in the criminal case against Martín Pradenas Dürr, who was convicted in 2022 of multiple sexual offences, a verdict later annulled by the Supreme Court on procedural grounds. Bulnes withdrew from the case after being elected to the Chamber of Deputies, as Chilean law prohibits sitting parliamentarians from practising law. The victim continued to be represented by Bulnes’s son, Ignacio Celedón Bulnes.

Following the annulment of the conviction, Bulnes publicly emphasized the importance of safeguarding victims’ rights within the criminal justice system and criticised practices that lead to revictimisation, particularly in cases requiring victims to testify repeatedly. As a legislator, she supported initiatives to amend the Criminal Procedure Code to strengthen the procedural rights of victims of sexual violence and advocated for a gender-sensitive approach to justice.

== Political career ==
Bulnes was elected to the Chamber of Deputies in the parliamentary elections of November 2021 as an independent candidate running on a seat allocated to the Democratic Revolution party, within the Apruebo Dignidad coalition. She represented the 17th district of the Maule Region, which includes the communes of Talca, Curicó, Constitución, Molina, San Clemente, and others. She received 8,411 votes, corresponding to 3.49% of the valid votes cast.

She assumed office on 11 March 2022 for the 2022–2026 legislative term. During her time in parliament, she served on several standing committees, including Agriculture, Forestry and Rural Development; Ethics and Transparency; Older Persons and Disability; Human Rights and Indigenous Peoples; Housing and Urban Development; and Family.

Bulnes also participated in a number of special investigative committees, addressing issues such as alleged overpricing by Metrogas, compliance with the 1947 Endesa irrigation agreement related to the Laguna del Maule, the San Ramón Fault, the transfer of public funds for informal settlements, and a Burkholderia cepacia bacterial outbreak.

From July 2024, she was a member of the Frente Amplio and Independents parliamentary committee.

== International activities ==
In June 2022, she visited Morocco at the invitation of the Women’s Commission of the Moroccan House of Representatives. In November 2023, she participated in the Global Forum of Women Leaders in Reykjavík, Iceland. She was also a member of The International Panel of Parliamentarians for Freedom of Religion or Belief (IPPFoRB) and attended its academy session in Rio de Janeiro in December 2023.

She chaired the Chile–Netherlands interparliamentary group and participated in several other parliamentary friendship groups.

== Personal life ==
She was married to lawyer and politician Roberto Celedón Fernández, a former member of the Constitutional Convention. She was the mother of ten children and had 24 grandchildren.

== Death ==
In May 2024, Bulnes announced via a video posted on her social media accounts that she had begun treatment for cancer. She died in Santiago on 22 November 2024, while serving as a member of parliament. On 26 November 2024, the Senate of Chile observed a minute of silence in her memory at the beginning of its session.
