= Homero Gutiérrez =

Chilean politician

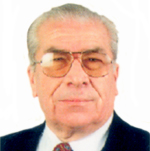

Homero Gutiérrez (13 October 1929 – 2 September 2009) was a Chilean politician. A member of the Christian Democratic Party, he served in the Chamber of Deputies of Chile.
