= Laureano Brizuela =

Argentine singer-songwriter and musician

Laureano Brizuela (born 22 July 1949) is an Argentine singer-songwriter and musician whose career has spanned over 30 years.

== Early life ==
Brizuela is the grandson of painter Laureano Brizuela Giménez (1891-1951). His mother, a Bolivian biochemist, later earned Argentine citizenship through her husband.

== Career ==
At first studying musicology, he later abandoned it in favor of pursuing a singing career. In 1972, when he was 22 years old, he released his first single.

He has produced a string of successful covers, including the Spanish version of Roy Orbison's classic 1956 song "Pretty Woman" into Muchachita.

== Albums ==
- Por qué te quiero tanto
- Laureano
- El americano
- El Ángel del Rock (seudónimo que Brizuela adoptó en México).
- Solo
- Viento del sur
- Lo más fuerte del Ángel del Rock
- 4 - Griten
- Viajero del tiempo
- Alborada
- Vivir una vez
- Huellas
- Estaciones
- Si quieres amarme
- 20 secretos de amor
