= Janet Arceo =

Mexican actress, TV presenter, announcer, director and businesswoman

Janett Arceo
- Born: Janett Arceo Maldonado; 30 September 1955 (age 69); Mexico City, Mexico
- Occupation(s): Actress, TV Presenter, announcer, director, businesswoman
- Years active: 1962–1963, 1973–
- Children: 1

Janett Arceo Maldonado (born 30 September 1955), known as Janet Arceo, is a Mexican actress, TV presenter, announcer, director and businesswoman.

== Filmography ==
Series, Films, Theater, TV Show, Documentary
Year	Title	Role	Notes
1962	Atrás de las nubes	Niña	Film
1962	Los forajidos		Film
1963	Aventuras de las hermanas X		Film
1973	El Chavo del Ocho	Doña Eduviges "La loca de la escalera"	2 Episodes
1980	La mujer ahora	Herself	TV series
1982	Juguemos a Cantar	Herself/Presenter	TV show
1986-88	Estrellas de los 80's	Herself/Presenter	TV show
1997-02	Teletón	Herself/Presenter	TV show
1998	Memoria viva de ciertos días	Herself	Documentary
2001	Una vida dedicada a los medios: Homenaje a Luis Carbajo	Herself	Documentary
2005	Momentos para no olvidar: 55 años de la TV en México	Herself	Documentary
2006	Aún hay más... Homenaje a Raúl Velasco	Herself	TV movie
2007	La historia detras del mito	Herself	TV movie
2009	Los monólogos de la vagina		Theatrical Performance
