= Chile in the OTI Festival 1978 =

- OTI Festival 1978
- Participating broadcasters: Televisión Nacional de Chile (TVN); Corporación de Televisión de la Universidad Católica de Chile (UCTV); Corporación de Televisión de la Universidad de Chile (UTV); Corporación de Televisión de la Universidad Católica de Valparaíso (UCVTV)
- Country: Chile
- Selection process: National selection
- Selection date: 29 October 1978

Competing entry
- Song: "Pobrecito mortal, si quieres ver menos televisión, descubrirás qué aburrido estarás por la tarde"
- Artist: Florcita Motuda
- Songwriter: Raúl Florcita Alarcón Rojas

Placement
- Final result: 7th, 17 points

Participation chronology
◄1977 •	1978	• 1979►

Chile was represented at the OTI Festival 1978 with the song "Pobrecito mortal, si quieres ver menos televisión, descubrirás qué aburrido estarás por la tarde", written and performed by Florcita Motuda. The Chilean participating broadcasters, Televisión Nacional de Chile (TVN), Corporación de Televisión de la Universidad Católica de Chile (UCTV), Corporación de Televisión de la Universidad de Chile (UTV), and Corporación de Televisión de la Universidad Católica de Valparaíso (UCVTV), jointly selected their entry through a national televised competition with several phases. The song, that was performed in position 3, placed seventh out of 19 competing entries, with 17 points. In addition, the four broadcasters were also the host broadcasters and staged the event at the Municipal Theatre in Santiago.

== National stage ==
Televisión Nacional de Chile (TVN), Corporación de Televisión de la Universidad Católica de Chile (UCTV), Corporación de Televisión de la Universidad de Chile (UTV), and Corporación de Televisión de la Universidad Católica de Valparaíso (UCVTV), held a competition with different televised preselections and a national final to select their entry for the 7th edition of the OTI Festival. Each of the four broadcasters would contribute three songs to the twelve-song national final, which was the first color broadcast via the national network of stations.

=== TVN pre-selection ===
TVN held its own preselection for its three songs, which consisted of eight televised qualifying rounds of three songs each, held every Sunday between 2 July and 27 August 1978 within its show Tres a las tres, presented by María Olga Fernández, Gabriela Velasco, and María Graciela Gómez; from which the first-placed song in each round was qualified to a final round. The eight-song final round was held on Monday 28 August, and broadcast on Sunday 3 September, at Teatro Casino Las Vegas, with Susana Giménez, Fernando Ubiergo, Ruth Durante, and Jorge Romero as special guests.

==== Qualifying rounds of the TVN pre-selection ====
Qualifier

Result of the first qualifying round of the TVN pre-selection – 2 July 1978
Song	Artist	Songwriter(s)	Result
"Marinero en cualquier estero"	Mariela González	Mariela González	Qualified
	Danny Chilean		—N/a
	Iván Marcelo		—N/a

Result of the second qualifying round of the TVN pre-selection – 9 July 1978
Song	Artist	Songwriter(s)	Result
"Bolívar nació en la lluvia"	Desiderio Arenas	Desiderio Arenas	Qualified
"Hermano"	Eduardo Gatti	Eduardo Gatti	—N/a
"Mañanita"	Carlos Eugenio Romero	Carlos Eugenio Romero	—N/a

Result of the third qualifying round of the TVN pre-selection – 16 July 1978
Song	Artist	Songwriter(s)	Result
"Antonia"	Marcelo Muñoz	Marcelo Muñoz	—N/a
"Pablo Tierra, Pablo Mar"	Roberto Rojas	Roberto Rojas	—N/a
"Pobrecito mortal, si quieres ver menos televisión, descubrirás qué aburrido estarás por la tarde"	Florcita Motuda	Raúl Florcita Alarcón Rojas	Qualified

Result of the fourth qualifying round of the TVN pre-selection – 23 July 1978
Song	Artist	Songwriter(s)	Result
"La amistad, Violeta"	Hugo Moraga	Hugo Moraga	Qualified
			—N/a
			—N/a

Result of the fifth qualifying round of the TVN pre-selection – 30 July 1978
Song	Artist	Songwriter(s)	Result
"América"	Los Juglares	Ricardo Jofré; Eduardo Campos	—N/a
"Tierra sin tiempo ni lugar"	Patricio Carvallo	Ernesto Rencoret	—N/a
"Y era él"	Ana María Meza	Jaime Atria Jr.	Qualified

Result of the sixth qualifying round of the TVN pre-selection – 13 August 1978
Song	Artist	Songwriter(s)	Result
"Jesucrando"	Óscar Andrade	Óscar Andrade	—N/a
"Mientras estoy en mi ciudad"	Verónica Hurtado	Lucy Mohor	—N/a
"Sonríe, amor mío"	Juan Antonio Labra	Juan Antonio Labra	Qualified

Result of the seventh qualifying round of the TVN pre-selection – 20 August 1978
Song	Artist	Songwriter(s)	Result
"Con el correr del tiempo"	Reynaldo Tomás Martin	Reynaldo Tomás Martin	—N/a
"Sin nombre, sin voz"	Dúo Libra	Paz Aldunate	Qualified
"Una más"	María Angélica Ramírez	María Angélica Ramírez	—N/a

Result of the eighth qualifying round of the TVN pre-selection – 27 August 1978
Song	Artist	Songwriter(s)	Result
"Tu invento soy yo"	María Inés Naveillán	Luis "Poncho" Venegas	Qualified
			—N/a
			—N/a

==== Final round of the TVN pre-selection ====
Result of the final round of the TVN pre-selection – 28 August 1978
R/O	Song	Artist	Songwriter(s)	Votes	Result
1	"La amistad, Violeta"	Hugo Moraga	Hugo Moraga		—N/a
2	"Tu invento soy yo"	María Inés Naveillán	Luis "Poncho" Venegas	9	Qualified
3	"Sin nombre, sin voz"	Dúo Libra	Paz Aldunate		Qualified
4	"Y era él"	Ana María Meza	Jaime Atria Jr.		—N/a
5	"Pobrecito mortal, si quieres ver menos televisión, descubrirás qué aburrido estarás por la tarde"	Florcita Motuda	Raúl Florcita Alarcón Rojas	7	Qualified
6	"Marinero en cualquier estero"	Mariela González	Mariela González		—N/a
7	"Bolívar nació en la lluvia"	Desiderio Arenas	Desiderio Arenas		—N/a
8	"Sonríe, amor mío"	Juan Antonio Labra	Juan Antonio Labra		—N/a

=== Universities pre-selection ===
UCTV, UTV, and UCVTV organized a joint preselection to contribute their nine songs, which consisted of nine televised qualifying rounds of six songs each, held every Wednesday between 16 August and 11 October at Teatro Providencia in Providencia, from which the first-placed song in each round was directly qualified for the national final and the second-place song had a second chance the following round. On 18 October, a final presentation show was held where all nine qualified songs were performed. The shows were presented by Carmen Jaureguiberry and Juan La Rivera from UCTV, Raquel Argandoña and Juan Guillermo Vivado from UTV, and María José del Rey and Rodolfo Torrealba from UCVTV, who rotated their presentation duties in each program.

In each round, a jury of seven members, in which each broadcaster appointed two permanent jurors and the seventh was a rotating guest juror, scored each song between 1 and 5 points. The six permanent jurors were: Gina Zuanic and Octavio Espinoza appointed by UCTV, María de la Luz Necochea and Juan Carlos Gil appointed by UTV, and Sergio Cárcamo and Orlando Walter Muñoz appointed by UCVTV.

Result of the first qualifying round of the universities pre-selection – 16 August 1978
Song	Artist	Songwriter(s)	Points	Result
"Con guitarra y charango"	Osvaldo Carrasco	Osvaldo Carrasco; Rosa Carmona		—N/a
"Dime que sí, dilo otra vez"	María Luisa Sousa	Ricardo de la Fuente		Qualified
"El inventor de sueños"	Adriana Campusano	Adriana Campusano; L. Vicentini		—N/a
"Mi aldea"	Fernando Jiménez	Fernando Jiménez		2nd
"Mujer, mujer"	Roberto Viking Valdés	Nino García		—N/a
"Saltando pocitas"	Doris y Rossie	Jorge Cavada; Rubén Campos		—N/a

Result of the second qualifying round of the universities pre-selection – 23 August 1978
Song	Artist	Songwriter(s)	Points	Result
"El costurero"	Mariela and José Miguel González	Mariela González	31	Qualified
"Este es el día de participar en la creación del mundo"	Florcita Motuda	Raúl Florcita Alarcón Rojas	19	—N/a
"Hombre"	Sergio Berríos	Sergio Berríos Medel		—N/a
"Mi aldea"	Fernando Jiménez	Fernando Jiménez		—N/a
"Mi niño"	Claudio Hahn	Claudio Hahn San Cristóbal		—N/a
"Prende las luces, hermano"	Patricio Carvallo	Francisco Flores del Campo	30	2nd

Result of the third qualifying round of the universities pre-selection – 30 August 1978
Song	Artist	Songwriter(s)	Points	Result
"Ensueño"	Rodrigo Azagra	Rodrigo Bernabé Azagra		—N/a
"Lamento araucano"	Cristóbal	Marco Antonio Orozco		2nd
"Prende las luces, hermano"	Patricio Carvallo	Francisco Flores del Campo		—N/a
"Rebaño de amor"	Humberto José Onetto	Humberto José Onetto		—N/a
"Una pluma y un vals"	Rosa María Barrenechea	Rosa María Barrenechea		—N/a
"Vamos paloma"	Osvaldo Díaz and Grupo Cámara	Sergio Bravo; Edgardo Riquelme	35	Qualified

Result of the fourth qualifying round of the universities pre-selection – 6 September 1978
Song	Artist	Songwriter(s)	Points	Result
"El cantar del cantor"	Julio Zegers	Julio Zegers	33	Qualified
"La vida en un día"	Ángel Maulén Ríos	Ángel Maulén Ríos	28	2nd
"Lamento araucano"	Cristóbal	Marco Antonio Orozco	23	—N/a
"Igual que un niño"	Gastón Alfonso	Zita Müller; Martín Andrade	21	—N/a
"Recuerdos"	Rafael Garay	Rafael Garay Heins; R. Berríos	12	—N/a
"Ven a mi corazón"	Carlos Salazar	Carlos Salazar Sepúlveda	20	—N/a

Result of the fifth qualifying round of the universities pre-selection – 13 September 1978
Song	Artist	Songwriter(s)	Points	Result
"Amiga cordillera"	Pachi Salgado	Paz Cecilia Salgado	17	—N/a
"Golondrina triste"	Marcelo	Nano Concha; Marcelo	24	2nd
"Hoy quiero soñar"	Vicky Castillo	Marcos Torres Martínez	20	—N/a
"La vida en un día"	Ángel Maulén Ríos	Ángel Maulén Ríos	30	Qualified
"Una extraña en nuestro hogar"	Alejandro	Enzo Cavallo; Óscar Cáceres		—N/a
"Y el jardín de tu vida florecerá"	Norman Ilic	Norman Ilic Muñoz	21	—N/a

Result of the sixth qualifying round of the universities pre-selection – 20 September 1978
Song	Artist	Songwriter(s)	Points	Result
"Bienvenida"	Boris Valdés	Boris Valdés Romero	11	—N/a
"Canción de la niñez"	Margarita Rojas and Juan Esteban Solari	Margarita Rojas; Juan Esteban Solari	24	—N/a
"¿Cómo amarnos?"	David Oyarzún	David Oyarzún		—N/a
"Golondrina triste"	Marcelo	Nano Concha; Marcelo	30	2nd (Note: The songwriter, Nano Concha, withdrew the song from the competition after finishing second for the second time, considering the jury biased.)
"Un poeta diferente"	Luz Eliana	Ernesto Rencoret	35	Qualified
"Volver a casa"	Sergio Lillo	María Angélica Ramírez	25	—N/a

Result of the seventh qualifying round of the universities pre-selection – 27 September 1978
Song	Artist	Songwriter(s)	Points	Result
"Canción de la niñez"	Margarita Rojas and Juan Esteban Solari	Margarita Rojas; Juan Esteban Solari	22	—N/a
"Canción del hombre libre"	Óscar Olivares Zúñiga and Óscar Olivares Vásquez	Óscar Olivares Zúñiga; Óscar Olivares Vásquez	24	—N/a
"En casa de una mujer llamada María"	Capri	Nano Acevedo	31	Qualified
"En el viento"	Hugo Moraga	Hugo Moraga	15	—N/a
"Para cantar"	Soledad and Gabriela	Germán Becker; Eugenio Rengifo	25	2nd
"Un canto al amor"	Patricio Carvallo	Reinaldo Martínez; L. Aguilera		—N/a

Result of the eighth qualifying round of the universities pre-selection – 4 October 1978
Song	Artist	Songwriter(s)	Points	Result
"Cuando mi voz florezca"	José Antonio Chávez	Arturo Barros Medina		—N/a
"El siglo se va"	Antonio Zabaleta	Ricardo de la Fuente		Qualified
"Existencia"	Eduardo Salazar	Eduardo Salazar; Hernán Salazar R.		—N/a
"Para cantar"	Soledad and Gabriela	Germán Becker; Eugenio Rengifo		—N/a
"Un árbol es más que tú"	Ruperto Fonfach	Ruperto Fonfach Hernández		—N/a
"Ya es tiempo"	Rodrigo Gana	Luis Riderelli; Jaime Bianchi		2nd

Result of the ninth qualifying round of the universities pre-selection – 11 October 1978
Song	Artist	Songwriter(s)	Points	Result
"La tregua"	Óscar Andrade	Óscar Andrade	30 (Note: In the tie-breaking vote, "Viejo pueblo, volveré" received 4 votes, while "La tregua" received 3.)	—N/a
"Los últimos tiempos"	Árbol y Fruto	Galvarino Villota	25	—N/a
"Profecía"	Juan Carlos González	Renato Allaria Rojo; Adolfo Alvial		—N/a
"Viejo pueblo, volveré"	Luis Miguel Silva	Luis Miguel Silva	30	Qualified
"Y no estás aquí"	Lucy Mohor	Lucy Mohor		—N/a
"Ya es tiempo"	Rodrigo Gana	Luis Riderelli; Jaime Bianchi		—N/a

=== National final ===
The national final was held on 29 October 1978, beginning at 21:30 CLST (00:30+1 UTC), at the Municipal Theatre in Santiago, and was presented by Raúl Matas and Raquel Argandoña. The musical director was Juan Azúa. It was staged by TVN, and broadcast on TVN's Canal 7, UCTV's Canal 13, UTV's Canal 9, UCVTV's Canal 5, Radio Minería, and Radio Nacional de Chile.

Competing entries on the national final – Chile 1978
Song	Artist	Songwriter(s)	Conductor
"Dime que sí, dilo otra vez"	María Luisa Sousa	Ricardo de la Fuente	
"El cantar del cantor"	Julio Zegers	Julio Zegers	
"El costurero"	Mariela and José Miguel González	Mariela González	Sergio González
"El siglo se va"	Antonio Zabaleta	Ricardo de la Fuente	
"En casa de una mujer llamada María"	Capri	Nano Acevedo	
"La vida en un día"	Ángel Maulén Ríos	Ángel Maulén Ríos	
"Pobrecito mortal, si quieres ver menos televisión, descubrirás qué aburrido estarás por la tarde"	Florcita Motuda	Raúl Florcita Alarcón Rojas	Horacio Saavedra
"Sin nombre, sin voz"	Dúo Libra	Paz Aldunate	Horacio Saavedra
"Tu invento soy yo"	María Inés Naveillán	Luis "Poncho" Venegas	Horacio Saavedra
"Un poeta diferente"	Luz Eliana	Ernesto Rencoret	Juan Azúa
"Vamos paloma"	Osvaldo Díaz and Grupo Cámara	Sergio Bravo; Edgardo Riquelme	
"Viejo pueblo, volveré"	Luis Miguel Silva	Luis Miguel Silva	

Five expert jurors scored all entries between 1 and 5 points. The jurors were: Raquel Barros, Carlos Dourthé, Mariano Casanova, Alejandra Ramos, and Ítalo Passalacqua.

The winner was "Pobrecito mortal, si quieres ver menos televisión, descubrirás qué aburrido estarás por la tarde", written and performed by Florcita Motuda. The festival ended with a reprise of the winning entry.

Winner

Result of the national final – Chile 1978
R/O	Song	Artist	Points	Result
1	"Pobrecito mortal, si quieres ver menos televisión, descubrirás qué aburrido estarás por la tarde"	Florcita Motuda	23	1
2	"Dime que sí, dilo otra vez"	María Luisa Sousa	15	8
3	"Vamos paloma"	Osvaldo Díaz and Grupo Cámara	19	2
4	"Sin nombre, sin voz"	Dúo Libra	16	6
5	"El cantar del cantor"	Julio Zegers	11	11
6	"Tu invento soy yo"	María Inés Naveillán	17	5
7	"La vida en un día"	Ángel Maulén Ríos	11	11
8	"El costurero"	Mariela and José Miguel González	15	8
9	"Viejo pueblo, volveré"	Luis Miguel Silva	12	10
10	"Un poeta diferente"	Luz Eliana	19	2
11	"El siglo se va"	Antonio Zabaleta	18	4
12	"En casa de una mujer llamada María"	Capri	16	6

Detailed vote of the national final – Chile 1978
R/O	Song	Raquel Barros	Carlos Dourthé	Mariano Casanova	Alejandra Ramos	Ítalo Passalacqua	Total
1	"Pobrecito mortal, si quieres ver menos televisión, descubrirás qué aburrido estarás por la tarde"	5	4	5	4	5	23
2	"Dime que sí, dilo otra vez"	3	3	4	3	2	15
3	"Vamos paloma"	4	4	4	4	3	19
4	"Sin nombre, sin voz"	3	4	4	2	3	16
5	"El cantar del cantor"	3	2	3	2	1	11
6	"Tu invento soy yo"	3	3	3	4	4	17
7	"La vida en un día"	3	2	3	1	2	11
8	"El costurero"	3	4	4	3	1	15
9	"Viejo pueblo, volveré"	3	3	3	2	1	12
10	"Un poeta diferente"	5	4	4	4	2	19
11	"El siglo se va"	3	5	4	2	4	18
12	"En casa de una mujer llamada María"	4	4	4	3	1	16

== At the OTI Festival ==
On 2 December 1978, the OTI Festival was held at the Municipal Theatre in Santiago, hosted by TVN, UCTV, UTV, and UCVTV, and broadcast live throughout Ibero-America. Florcita Motuda performed "Pobrecito mortal, si quieres ver menos televisión, descubrirás qué aburrido estarás por la tarde" in position 3, with Horacio Saavedra conducting the event's orchestra, and placing seventh out of 19 competing entries, with 17 points.

The festival was broadcast live on TVN's Canal 7, UCTV's Canal 13, UTV's Canal 9, and UCVTV's Canal 5.

=== Voting ===
Each participating broadcaster, or group of broadcasters that jointly participated representing a country, assembled a national jury located in its respective country, consisting of four voting members and a president who would only decide in case of a tie. Each voting member scored each performance, except the entry representing its own country, between 1 and 5 votes right after it was performed, and at the end the president totaled all the scores and awarded 5 points to the most voted, 4 to the second, and so on down to 1 point. To ensure that there was no vote switching, before the voting segment began each participating broadcaster(s) announced to its national audience the vote of its jury in local opt-out from its studios.

Cristián Livingstone, Ximena Hormazábal, Liliana Mahn, Benjamín Mackenna and Alfredo Lamadrid were the five members of the Chilean jury, with the latter acting as the president of the jury and the spokesperson who announced the Chilean points at the festival. The local opt-out segment where the Chilean jury revealed their points to the Chilean audience was presented by Rodolfo Torrealba.

Points awarded to Chile
Score	Country
5 points	Paraguay; Brazil
4 points	Dominican Republic
3 points	
2 points	Puerto Rico
1 point	Uruguay

Points awarded by Chile
Score	Country
5 points	Brazil
4 points	Spain
3 points	Mexico
2 points	United States
1 point	Venezuela
