= RPC Televisión =

RPC
- Logo used since 2021
- Type: Free-to-air television network
- Country: Panama

Programming
- Language: Spanish
- Picture format: 1080i HDTV

Ownership
- Owner: Corporación Medcom
- Sister channels: Telemetro; Oye TV

History
- Launched: March 14, 1960; 66 years ago

Links
- Website: rpctv.com

Availability

Terrestrial
- Analog VHF: Channel 4 (listings may vary)
- Digital UHF: Channel 42

RPC-TV is a television network, and is headquartered in Panama City, Panama, with repeaters throughout the country. RPC is the oldest commercial TV station in Panama, airing imported shows, programming for kids, and local and international sporting events.

== History ==
Between 1956 and 1960, television was an exclusive privilege of the Panama Canal Zone, with SCN's broadcasts in English on Channel 8 being aimed at military and civilian residents. This changed on 14 March 1960 when RPC Television becomes the first television channel of Panama, changing the city life of all Panamanians. The experience and prestige achieved by Fernando Eleta with his company, Radio Programas Continentales (RPC) has been predicted since 1951, and it wouldn't take long before it managed to bring television to Panama. After two years of hard work, difficulties and risks, on March 14, 1960, RPC Television broke into city life with the broadcast of its first signal, beginning the era of television in Panama.

Near Christmas 1963, RPC expanded its reach to cover Chiriquí, Bocas and Darién.

The channel was penalized during the military regime in the 1980s. On December 25, 1989 (Christmas Day), RPC is authorized to return to the air, but its programming was limited to a special Christmas mass. In the days that followed, the only program that was broadcast was Los del Camino, a daily reflection produced by the Catholic Church.

== Programming ==
=== Former programming ===
==== Drama ====
Title	Original network	Ref
Buck James	ABC	
Chicago Hope	CBS	
CHiPs	NBC	
Christy	CBS	
Cobra	Syndication	
Dr Quinn, Medicine Woman	CBS	
Eerie, Indiana	NBC	
Father Dowling Mysteries	NBC/ABC	
Freddy's Nightmares	Syndication	
Highway to Heaven	NBC	
Hunter	NBC	
Knight Rider	NBC	
Lassie	CBS/Syndication	
MacGyver	ABC	
Melrose Place	Fox	
Miami Vice	NBC	
Models Inc.	Fox	
Moon Over Miami	ABC	
Riptide	NBC	
Robin's Hoods	Syndication	
Sidekicks	ABC	
The A-Team	NBC	
The Hat Squad	CBS	
The Love Boat	ABC	
The New Lassie	Syndication	
The Streets of San Francisco	ABC	
Time Trax	PTEN	
Touched by an Angel	CBS	
Walker, Texas Ranger	CBS	

==== Sitcom ====
Title	Original network	Ref
A Different World	NBC	
Baby Talk	ABC	
Blossom	NBC	
Boy Meets World	ABC	
California Dreams	NBC	
Cheers	NBC	
Dinosaurs	ABC	
Ellen	ABC	
Empty Nest	NBC	
Gilligan's Island	CBS	
Hogan's Heroes	CBS	
Home Improvement	ABC	
Mad About You	NBC	
Married... with Children	Fox	
Out of This World	Syndication	
Punky Brewster	NBC/Syndication	
Saved by the Bell	NBC	
Small Wonder	Syndication	
The Beverly Hillbillies	CBS	
The Cosby Show	NBC	
The Munsters Today	Syndication	
The Simpsons	Fox	
Webster	ABC/Syndication	
Who's the Boss?	ABC	

==== Telenovela ====
Title	Original network	Ref
Al filo de la muerte	Las Estrellas	
Alondra	Las Estrellas	
Café con aroma de mujer	Canal A	
Cañaveral de Pasiones	Las Estrellas	
Dulce Enemiga	Venevisión	
Los Parientes Pobres	Las Estrellas	
Si Dios me quita la vida	Las Estrellas	
Tieta	Rede Globo	
Tropicaliente	Rede Globo	
