= La Huerta, Chile =

Coordinates: 35.0667°S 71.6667°W

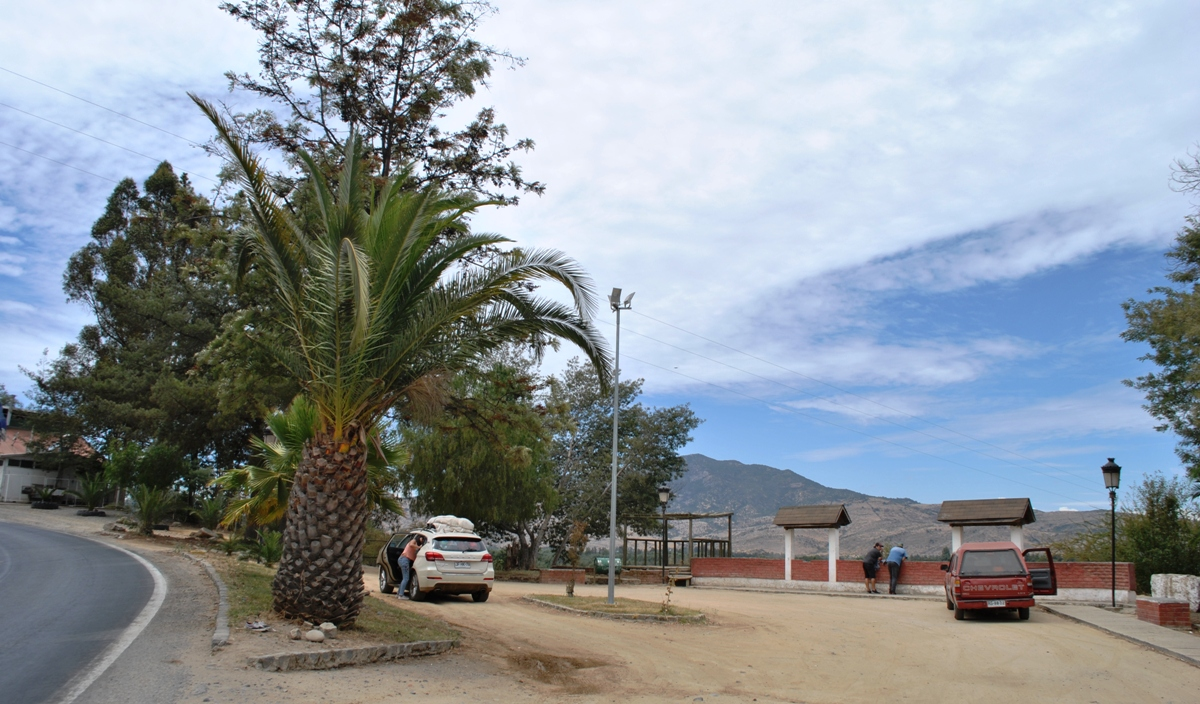
La Huerta viewpoint

La Huerta, or Huerta de Mataquito is a village (aldea) or small town near the north bank of the Mataquito River, in the Hualañé commune, in the Curicó Province, in the Maule Region, of Chile. It is 45 kilometers west of the city of Curicó.

Nearby to the northeast is the Cerro Chiripilco and the monument commemorating the death of Lautaro in the Battle of Mataquito that is thought to have been fought at its foot near the Mataquito River.

== Sources ==
- Francisco Solano Asta Buruaga y Cienfuegos, Diccionario geográfico de la República de Chile, Segunda Edicion Corregida y Aumentada, Nueva York, D. Appelton y Compania, 1899. Pg. 319, Huerta de Mataquito
