= Rayén Quitral =

Chilean actress of Mapuche descent (1916-1979)

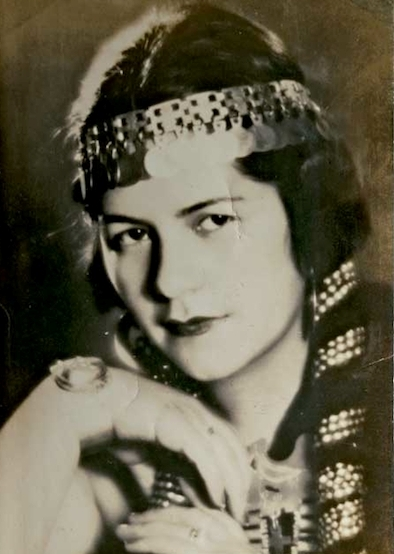
- Quitral in 1938
- Born: María Georgina Quitral Espinoza; 7 November 1916; Iloca, Chile
- Died: 20 October 1979 (aged 62); Santiago, Chile
- Occupations: Opera singer, actress
- Years active: 1937-1967

María Georgina Quitral Espinoza, more commonly known as Rayén Quitral (7 November 1916 – 20 October 1979), was a Chilean soprano and stage actress of Mapuche and Picunche descent. Known for her performance of the character of the "Queen of the Night" in the opera The Magic Flute, she was also known for regularly appearing in indigenous Mapuche dress, publicly displaying pride for her indigenous ancestry.

== Biography ==
Rayén Quitral was born in the village of Iloca, in the commune of Licantén within the province of Curicó, in the Maule Region. She studied singing in Chile, before debuting aged 21 at the Municipal Theatre of Santiago in 1937. 4 years later, Quitral performed the role of the "Queen of the Night" in Mozart's opera The Magic Flute at the Colón Theatre of Buenos Aires in 1941. She went on to appear in multiple performances across the Americas, later residing for a long period in Mexico.

Quitral performed in Lucia de Lammermoor in Chile in 1942, as well as playing the role of Gilda in Rigoletto in 1943. In 1950, she toured multiple concerts in Italy and France, as well as London, where she achieved great success in 1951, once more with a performance of The Magic Flute. This acclaim led to her appearance in Buckingham Palace afterwards.

In 1967, she retired aged 51 from touring, and dedicated herself to educating young people of limited means in singing. On 19 September 1972, the Chilean government awarded her a large pension. Quitral died on 20 October 1979 in Santiago, Chile.
