= Joaquín Echenique =

Chilean politician (1863–1959)

Member of the Senate
- In office 15 May 1926 – 6 June 1932
- Constituency: 4th Provincial Grouping
- In office 15 May 1918 – 11 September 1924
- Constituency: Santiago
- In office 15 May 1912 – 15 May 1918
- Constituency: Linares

Member of the Chamber of Deputies
- In office 15 May 1906 – 15 May 1909
- Constituency: Curicó and Vichuquén
- In office 15 May 1903 – 15 May 1906
- Constituency: Santiago
- In office 15 May 1897 – 15 May 1903
- Constituency: Caupolicán

Personal details
- Born: 12 February 1863 Santiago, Chile
- Died: 17 July 1959 Chile
- Party: Conservative Party
- Spouse: Josefina Letelier Valdés
- Education: University of Chile
- Occupation: Engineer, agriculturist, businessman, politician

José Joaquín Esteban Echenique Gandarillas (12 February 1863 – 17 July 1959) was a Chilean engineer, agriculturist, businessman and politician. He served as deputy and later as senator in the National Congress of Chile.

== Early life and education ==
Echenique was born in Santiago on 12 February 1863, to José Francisco Echenique Tagle and Irene Gandarillas Valdés.

He studied geographical engineering from the University of Chile, graduating on 26 July 1885.

== Political career ==
He first entered the National Congress as deputy for the commune of Caupolicán for the 1897–1900 and 1900–1903 legislative terms.

He was later elected deputy for Santiago for the 1903–1906 period and for Curicó and Vichuquén for the 1906–1909 legislative period.

Although he was a member of the Conservative Party, in 1905 and 1906, Echenique supported the presidential campaign of Pedro Montt, forming a political group known as the montanos, which contributed to Montt’s electoral victory.

Echenique entered the Senate in 1912 as senator for Linares for the 1912–1918 term. He was re-elected as senator for Santiago for the 1918–1924 and 1924–1930 terms. However, the National Congress was dissolved in September 1924 as a result of a military junta.

Echenique was again elected as senator for the 4th Provincial Grouping for the 1926–1934 legislative term and later re-elected for the 1930–1938 term. However, a socialist coup d'état led to the dissolution of the National Congress in June 1932.
