= Licancel Airport =

- IATA: none; ICAO: SCKN

Summary
- Airport type: Private
- Serves: Licantén, Chile
- Elevation AMSL: 59 ft / 18 m
- Coordinates: 34°59′20″S 72°1′12″W

Map
- Location of Licancel Airport in Chile

Runways
Direction	Length		Surface
Direction	m	ft	Surface
05/23	960	3,150	Gravel
- Source: Landings.com Google Maps GCM

Licancel Airport Spanish: Aeropuerto de Licancel, (ICAO: SCKN) is an airport serving the Celulosa Arauco Licancel wood pulp plant 3 kilometres (1.9 mi) west of Licantén, a town in the Maule Region of Chile.

The airport lies in a narrow strip between the J-60 highway and the Mataquito River. There is high terrain to the north and west of the runway, and a dropoff into the river on the south.

== See also ==
- Transport in Chile
- List of airports in Chile
