= Curicó La Montaña Airport =

Airport in Chile

La Montaña Airport
- IATA: none; ICAO: SCTM

Summary
- Airport type: Private
- Serves: Curicó, Chile
- Elevation AMSL: 1,969 ft / 600 m
- Coordinates: 34°58′08″S 70°56′00″W

Map
- Location of La Montaña Airport in Chile

Runways
Direction	Length		Surface
Direction	m	ft	Surface
10/28	795	2,608	Grass
- Source: Landings.com Google Maps GCM

La Montaña Airport Spanish: Aeropuerto de La Montaña, (ICAO: SCTM) is an airstrip 27 kilometres (17 mi) east of Curicó, a city in the Maule Region of Chile.

The airstrip is in the valley of the Teno River, near the point where it enters the Chilean Central Valley from the Andes foothills. There is high and mountainous terrain in all quadrants except southwest.

The Curico VOR-DME (Ident:ICO) is located 18.2 nautical miles (33.7 km) west of the airstrip.

== See also ==
- Transport in Chile
- List of airports in Chile
