= Iloca, Chile =

Iloca
- Town
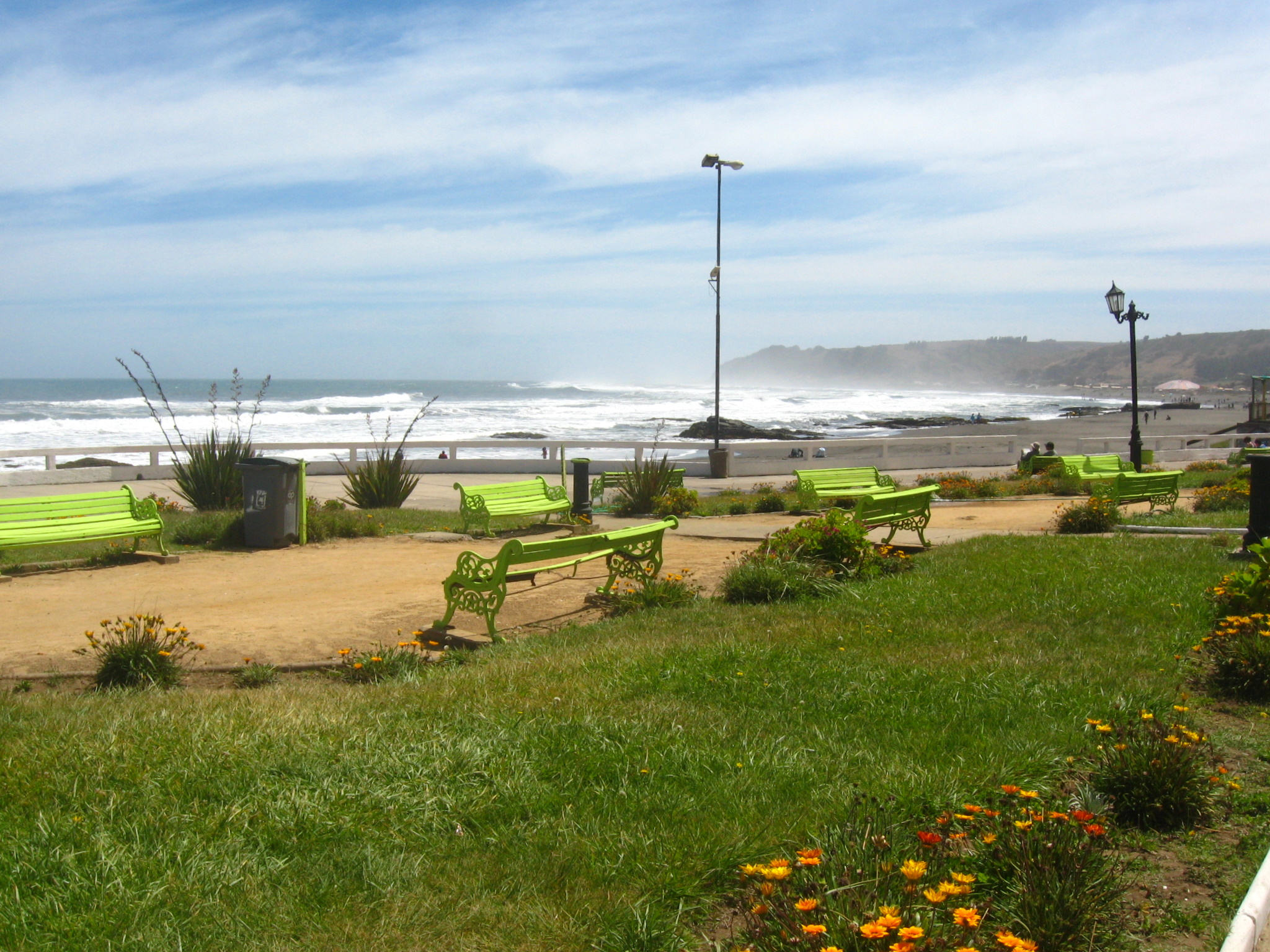
- Iloca

- Coat of arms

- Location in Chile
- Coordinates: 34°55′S 72°11′W
- Country: Chile
- Region: Maule
- Province: Curicó
- Commune: Licantén

Population (2002)
  - Total: 345
- Time zone: UTC-4 (CLT)
  - Summer (DST): UTC-3 (CLST)
- Area code: 56 +

Iloca is a small coastal town in Chile, located in the commune of Licantén, Curicó Province, Maule Region. It is located 120 kilometers west of Curicó.

According to the 2002 census, it has a population of 345 inhabitants, although it increases considerably during the summer months.

Iloca was critically damaged by the 2010 Chile earthquake, stemming mostly from the following tsunami that hit the nearby coast hours later. Approximately 70% of Iloca's buildings were destroyed by these disasters.

The closest large settlement is the city of Constitución, Chile.

== Etymology ==
The name "Iloca" comes from the Mapuche word "ilokan", meaning the act of killing an animal to extract its meat.

== Notable people ==
Rayén Quitral, Opera singer and Actress
