= Lora, Chile =

Coordinates: 35°01′S 72°04′W

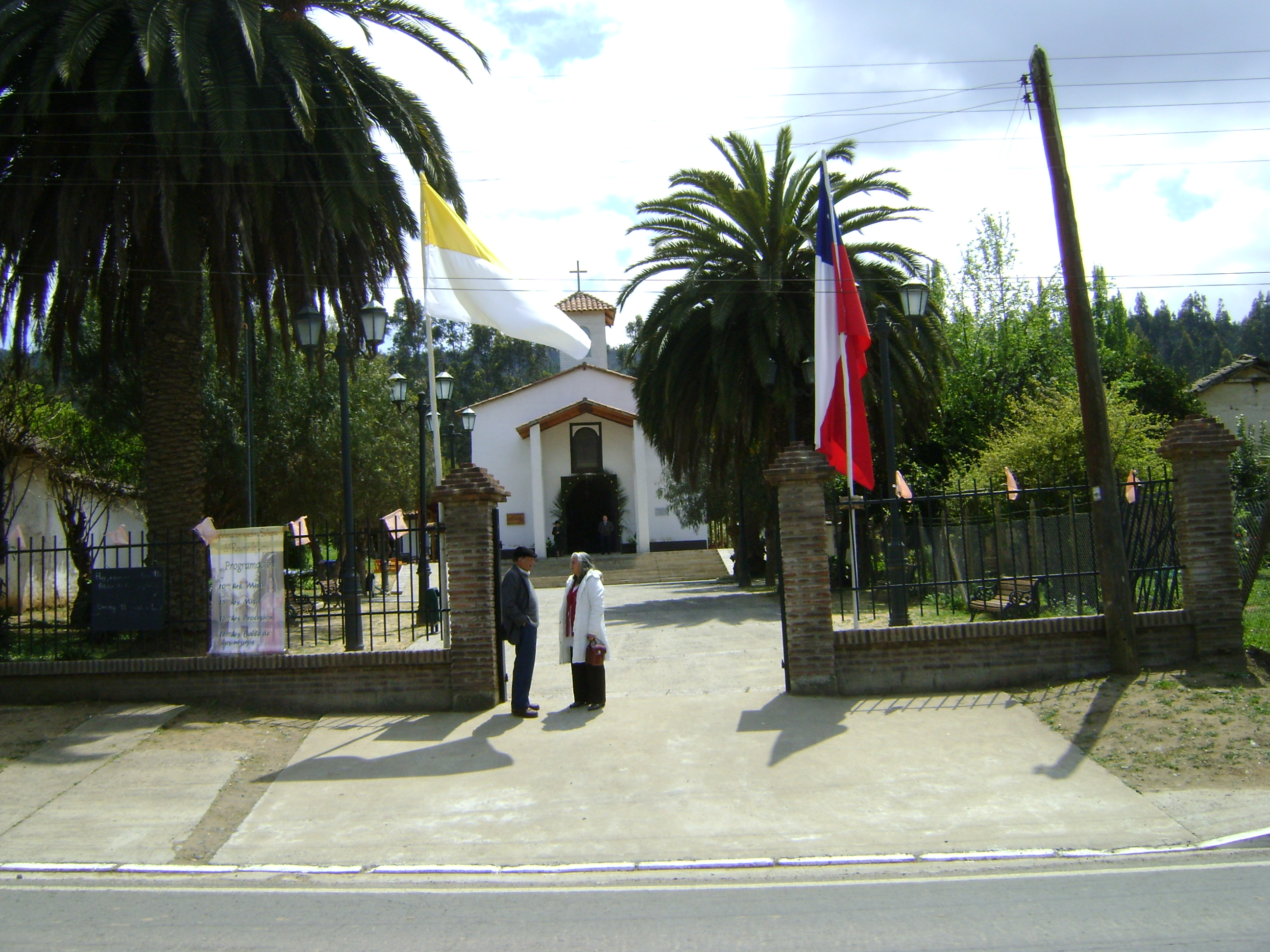

Lora is a town on the Mataquito River, in the Licantén commune of the Curicó Province, Maule Region, in Chile. It was named for the tribe of Promaucaes that inhabited the region.

== Sources ==
- Thomas Guevara, Historia de Curicó, Alicante : Biblioteca Virtual Miguel de Cervantes, 2000 Originally published in 1891.
