= Los Callejones =

Town in Biobio, Chile

Coordinates: 37°12′15″S 72°40′09″W

- Los Callejones de Turquía
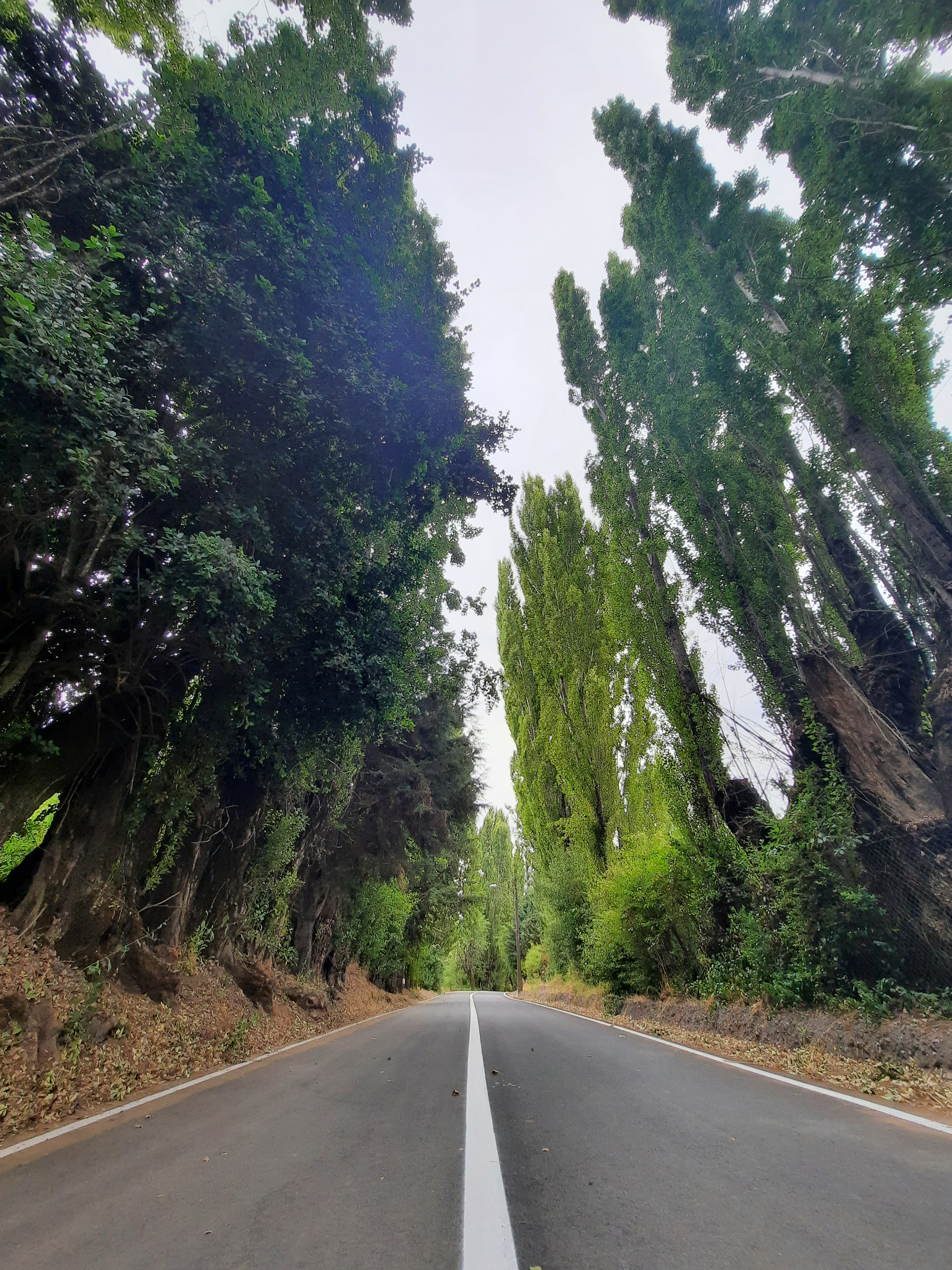
- Interactive map of Los Callejones
- Country: Chile
- Region: Biobio

Los Callejones is a rural Chilean town located 14km from the city of San Rosendo in the region of Biobio and the homonymous province. The town is known for being home to one of the oldest Malbec wine strains in Chile and South America, having vines more than 150 years old.

== History ==
The precise year when this area began to be populated is unknown and there are no writings that tell the beginnings of the place, much of the history that exists is the product of the stories that the ancient settlers told their children and that have been transferred from generation to generation. It is said that Turkey took that name because a family of Arab origin settled in this area of San Rosendo Rural approximately more than a century ago.

The rural arrears currently called Turkey, Los Callejones and La Quebrada for a long time were known as one, which was simply named Turkey, the last two being known as Los Callejones de Turkey and La Quebrada de Turkey. Years later it was called Los Callejones, as a result of "El Callejón", the main road of the place, which was occupied to carry out Chilean races when the day of the Immaculate Conception Celebration was commemorated. María, also known as la purísima, a holiday for which this settlement was widely known in the rural world of those times.

== Population ==
According to the 2017 Census, Los Callejones has a total population of 94 inhabitants and 53 dwellings, which places it within the denomination of a hamlet, being one of the most populated rural towns in the San Rosendo commune. The inhabitants are mainly farmers and ranchers. In the past, the hamlet was a much more populated settlement, but the scarcity of jobs and the poor living conditions in the countryside, motivated the new generations to have to leave the town and seek a better life in the cities, this has caused the aging of the population of the place, its residents being mainly elderly people.

== Geography ==
Los Callejones has hills and streams that in certain places give it the appearance of a valley, it also has extensive plains with soft reliefs used for agriculture. One of the streams that feed the estero tricauco, which is born in the rural sector "La Quebrada" product of different water courses coming from the hills, to finally flow into the Claro River.
