= San Miguel Airport =

San Miguel Airport may refer to:

- San Miguel Field, in the Dominican Republic
- Romeral San Miguel Airport, in Chile
- San Miguel South Airport, in Bolivia
- San Miguel Airport (Panama), in Panama
- San Miguel Ranch Airport at Trementina Base in New Mexico
