= Liolaemus buergeri =

Conservation status
- Least Concern (IUCN 3.1)

Scientific classification
- Kingdom: Animalia
- Phylum: Chordata
- Class: Reptilia
- Order: Squamata
- Suborder: Iguania
- Family: Liolaemidae
- Genus: Liolaemus
- Species: L. buergeri

Binomial name
- Liolaemus buergeri F. Werner, 1907

Species of lizard

Liolaemus buergeri, also known commonly as Buerger's tree iguana, is a species of lizard in the family Liolaemidae. The species is native to Argentina and Chile.

== Etymology ==
The specific name, buergeri, is in honor of German explorer Otto Bürger (born 1865), who collected natural history specimens in South America.

== Geographic range ==
In Argentina L. buergeri is found in Mendoza Province and Neuquén Province. In Chile it is found in Curicó Province and Talca Province.

== Habitat ==
The preferred natural habitat of L. buergeri is shrubland with rocky areas, at altitudes of 1,500–3,000 m (4,900–9,800 ft).

== Diet ==
L. buergeri is omnivorous.

== Reproduction ==
L. buergeri is viviparous.
