= Romeral San Miguel Airport =

San Miguel Airport Aeropuerto de San Miguel
- IATA: none; ICAO: SCOE

Summary
- Airport type: Public
- Serves: Romeral, Chile
- Elevation AMSL: 1,509 ft / 460 m
- Coordinates: 34°57′43″S 71°1′05″W

Map
- Location of Romeral San Miguel Airport in Chile

Runways
Direction	Length		Surface
Direction	m	ft	Surface
10/28	500	1,640	Gravel
- Source: Landings.com Google Maps GCM

San Miguel Airport (Spanish: Aeropuerto de San Miguel, (ICAO: SCOE)) is an airport 9 kilometres (5.6 mi) east of Romeral, a town in the Maule Region of Chile.

The runway has an additional 100 metres (330 ft) of unpaved overrun on the west end. The Curico VOR-DME (Ident: ICO) is located 9.8 nautical miles (18.1 km) west of the airport, on the General Freire Airfield.

== See also ==
- Transport in Chile
- List of airports in Chile
