= Hualañé =

- Town and Commune
- Coat of arms Map of Hualañé commune in the Maule Region Location in Chile
- Coordinates (type): 34°58′35.52″S 71°48′17.23″W
- Country: Chile
- Region: Maule
- Province: Curicó

Government
  - Type: Municipality
  - Alcalde: Claudio Pucher

Area
  - Total: 629.0 km^{2} (242.9 sq mi)
- Elevation: 22 m (72 ft)

Population (2012 Census)
  - Total: 9,303
  - Density: 14.79/km^{2} (38.31/sq mi)
  - Urban: 5,198
  - Rural: 4,543
- Demonym: hualañesino

Sex
  - Men: 5,059
  - Women: 4,682
- Time zone: UTC-4 (CLT)
  - Summer (DST): UTC-3 (CLST)
- Area code: 56 + 75
- Website: Municipality of Hualañé

Hualañé (Spanish pronunciation: [walaˈɲe]) is a town and commune of the Curicó Province in Chile's seven region of Maule.

Situated in the Mataquito River valley, its main activities are the agriculture of tomatoes, potatoes, and grapes for wine. The commune spans an area of 629.0 km^{2} (243 sq mi).

== Demographics ==
According to the 2002 census of Population and Housing by the National Statistics Institute (Instituto Nacional de Estadísticas or INE) the Hualañé commune had 9,741 inhabitants; of these, 5,198 (53.4%) lived in urban areas and 4,543 (46.6%) in rural areas. At that time, there were 5,059 men and 4,682 women. The population grew by 4.8% (443 persons) between the 1992 and 2002 censuses.

== Administration ==
As a commune, Hualañé is a third-level administrative division of Chile administered by a municipal council, headed by an alcalde who is directly elected every four years. The 2008-2012 alcalde is Claudio Pucher.

Within the electoral divisions of Chile, Hualañé is represented in the Chamber of Deputies by Roberto León (PDC) and Celso Morales (UDI) as part of the 36th electoral district, together with Curicó, Teno, Romeral, Molina, Sagrada Familia, Licantén, Vichuquén and Rauco. The commune is represented in the Senate by Juan Antonio Coloma Correa (UDI) and Andrés Zaldívar Larraín (PDC) as part of the 10th senatorial constituency (Maule-North).
