= Rauco =

- Town and Commune
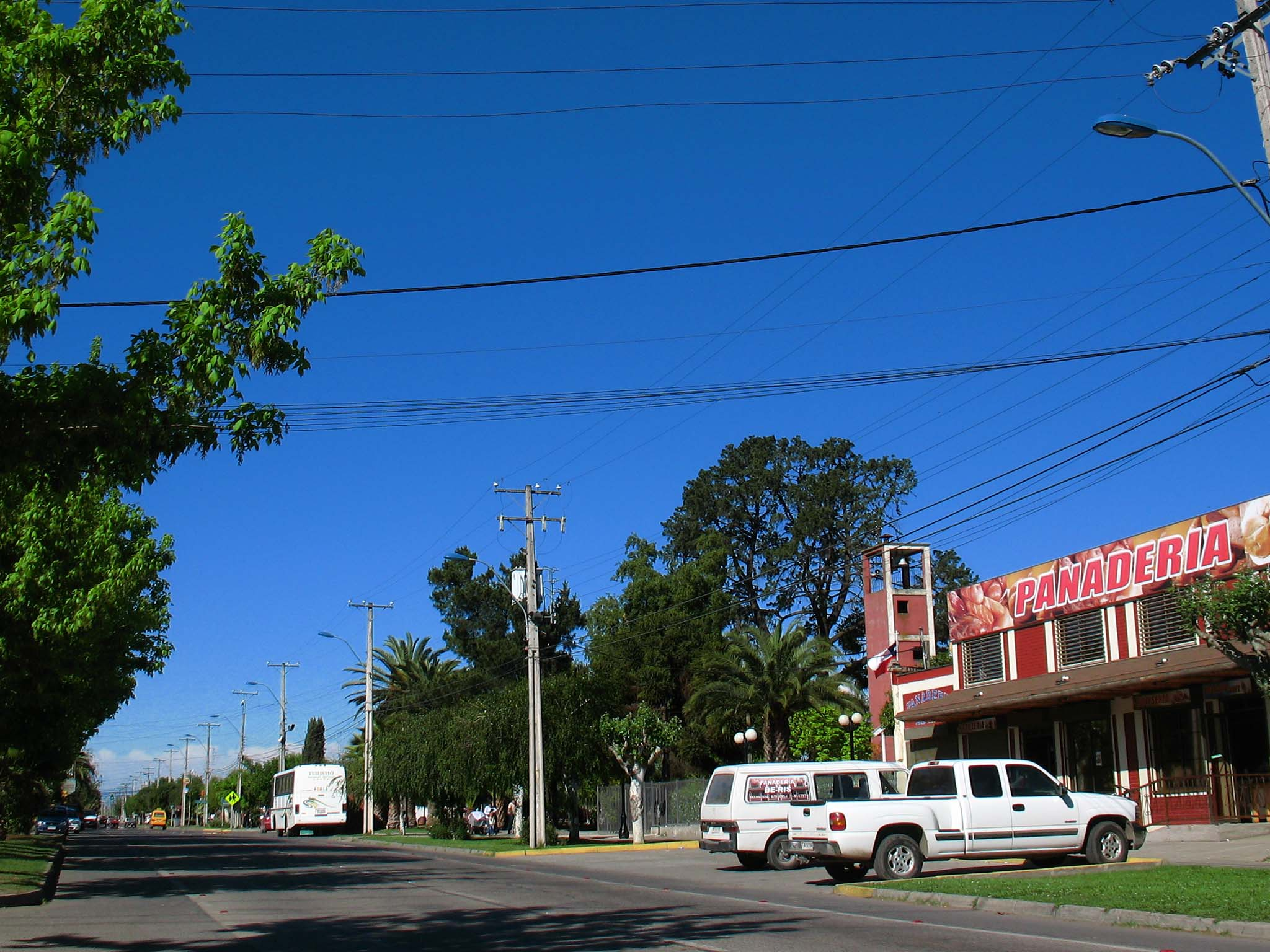

- Coat of arms Map of Rauco commune in the Maule Region Location in Chile
- Coordinates (city): 34°55′S 71°19′W
- Country: Chile
- Region: Maule
- Province: Curicó

Government
  - Type: Municipality
  - Alcalde: Enrique Francisco Ignacio Olivares Farías (PRSD)

Area
  - Total: 308.6 km^{2} (119.2 sq mi)
- Elevation: 175 m (574 ft)

Population (2012 Census)
  - Total: 9,543
  - Density: 30.92/km^{2} (80.09/sq mi)
  - Urban: 3,114
  - Rural: 5,452

Sex
  - Men: 4,364
  - Women: 4,202
- Time zone: UTC-4 (CLT)
  - Summer (DST): UTC-3 (CLST)
- Area code: 56 + 75
- Website: Municipality of Rauco

Rauco is a Chilean town and commune in Curicó Province, Maule Region. It is a mostly rural commune (60% of its population is rural), located 10 km away from the city of Curicó. The commune spans an area of 308.6 km^{2} (119 sq mi).

In mapudungún, Rauco means "the land of chalky water". The geographic limits are: North with Chépica, East with Teno, South with Sagrada Familia and Curicó, and West with Hualañé.

== Demographics ==
According to the 2002 census by the National Statistics Institute, the Rauco commune had 8,566 inhabitants 4,364 men and 4,202 women. Of these, 3,114 (36.4%) lived in urban areas and 5,452 (63.6%) in rural areas. The population grew by 9.5% (744 persons) between the 1992 and 2002 censuses.

== Tourism ==
The road that links Rauco with Curicó and Hualañé, presents characteristics for the practice of cycling.

The commune of Rauco has attractive features, like the suspension bridge (Puente de Cimbra), a few blocks away from the town square, where people usually go to picnics, bathing, among other things.

The dam, located in the area of La Palmilla, despite being private property, allows for camping, and the fishing of Basilichthys australis. Also, the area of El Parrón is known for its goat cheese, and the husbandry of sheep and goats. Other nearby areas include El Llano (known for its mushrooms and marmalade), Majadilla, Palquibudi, and Tricao.

Rauco, like most of Curicó's communes, has some colonial style houses, some of which used to be the main house for large estates.

== Administration ==
As a commune, Rauco is a third-level administrative division of Chile administered by a municipal council, headed by an alcalde who is directly elected every four years. The 2024-2028 la alcaldesa is Claudia Medina Hernandez.

Within the electoral divisions of Chile, Rauco is represented in the Chamber of Deputies by Roberto León (PDC) and Celso Morales (UDI) as part of the 36th electoral district, together with Curicó, Teno, Romeral, Molina, Sagrada Familia, Hualañé, Licantén and Vichuquén. The commune is represented in the Senate by Juan Antonio Coloma Correa (UDI) and Andrés Zaldívar Larraín (PDC) as part of the 10th senatorial constituency (Maule-North).
