= Jorge Castro de la Barra =

Chilean radio and television personality

Jorge Castro de la Barra (Curicó, 1953) is a Chilean radio and television personality, also known for his time-brokered health programs on minor television stations. He is also a fraudster, known for supposedly "miraculous" health supplements sold on his programs, as well as his activities on the brink of illegality.

== Biography ==
His career started in the early 1980s, presenting programs on radio since 1984 at earliest. He was the presenter of the eponymous radio show (Jorge Castro de la Barra) on Radio Novísima, which ran from 10pm to midnight and was sponsored by Bio-Strath, a Swiss natural product. His program had music interspersed with commercials for the Bio-Strath products, which gave him a solid financial situation. After the March 3, 1985 earthquake, he had the idea of setting up Ichthys symbols in household balconies. For this end, he created Revista Mariana with Miguel Ángel of Villa Alemana, which ended up releasing six issues.

He later joined Telenorte shortly before its shutdown, and in 2001, moved his programs to UCV Televisión. His program there was first named Armonizando la vida (Harmonizing Life) and aired at a 2pm slot.

The basic formula of his programs, which were, in essence, advertisements for his line of health supplements, had a minimalist set with a plastic human skeleton. His company, The Dokthor's, claimed to be the only such health supplement company "created by doctors", included products such as Nucleovital, Triconolil, Corpolight, Oftaplus and Osteo Artricura. His activities were often on the boundaries of illegality, using such loopholes to say that the products were not medications, but had good properties. In one of his programs on UCV in early 2004, he recommended not to put tight clothes for young girls, because they could expose their "tight, juicy buttocks". Clips from his programs frequently aired on the Chilean version of Caiga quien caiga on Mega, specifically in its Top Five and Grandes Pensadores segments. He was also part of the team behind Telecanal's talk show Influencia humana between late 2009 and early 2010.

== Personal life ==
Millions in wealth were stolen from his house in Curicó in July 2010, worth CL$4 million and US$2 million.

Jorge Castro does not believe in tarot, according to an interview given to ADN Radio in 2012. His views on homossexuality are conservative, believing only in the marriage between man and woman.

In December 2020, he suffered from a cancer on his left foot, holding a raffle to finance his operation.
