= Molina, Chile =

Molina
- City and Commune
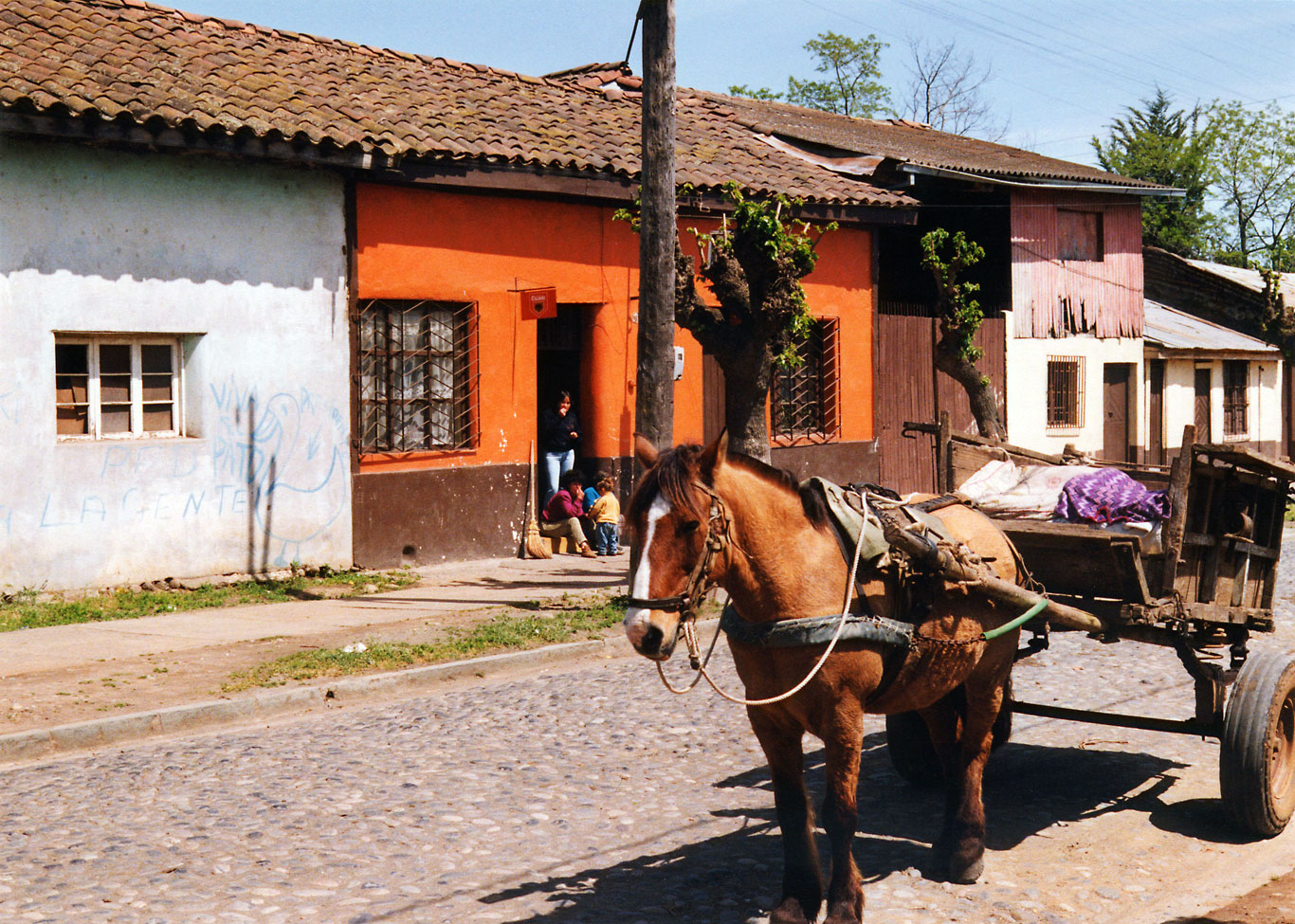
- Typical Chilean houses of Countryside

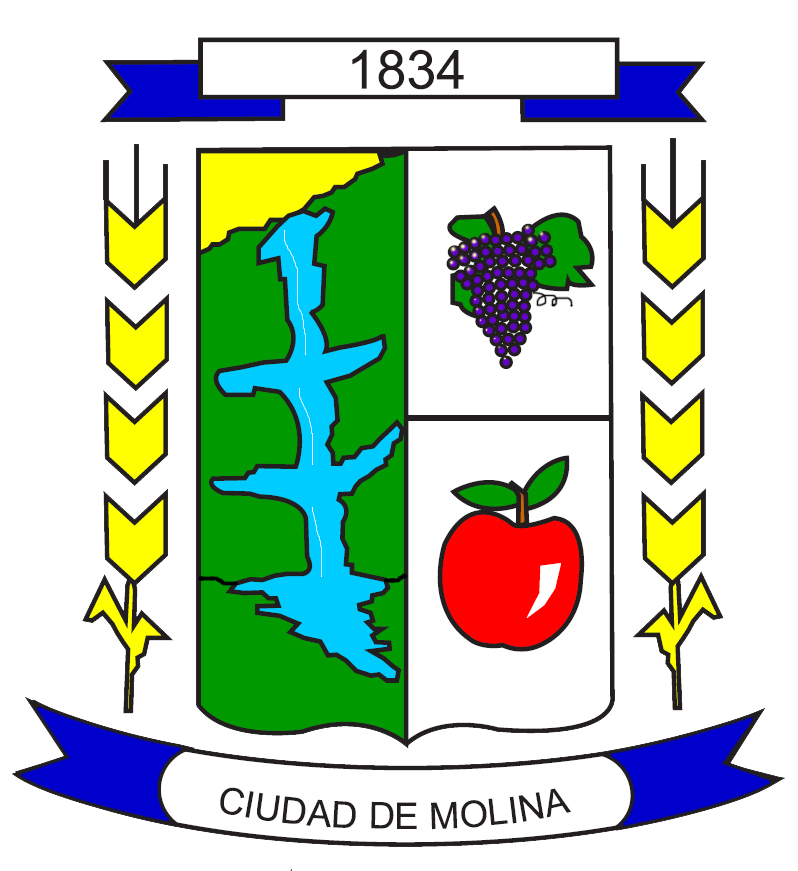
- Coat of arms Map of Molina commune in the Maule Region Location in Chile
- Coordinates (city): 35°06′52″S 71°16′57″W
- Country: Chile
- Region: Maule
- Province: Curicó
- Founded: 1834

Government
  - Type: Municipality
  - Alcalde: Felipe Méndez

Area
  - Total: 1,551.6 km^{2} (599.1 sq mi)
- Elevation: 273 m (896 ft)

Population (2012 Census)
  - Total: 40,329
  - Density: 25.992/km^{2} (67.319/sq mi)
  - Urban: 28,232
  - Rural: 10,289
- Demonym: Molinense

Sex
  - Men: 19,392
  - Women: 19,129
- Time zone: UTC-4 (CLT)
  - Summer (DST): UTC-3 (CLST)
- Area code: 56 + 75
- Website: Official website (in Spanish)

Molina is a Chilean city and commune in Curicó Province, Maule Region. Molina is named after Chilean Jesuit Juan Ignacio Molina.

== Demographics ==
According to the 2002 census of the National Statistics Institute, Molina spans an area of 1,551.6 km^{2} (599 sq mi) and has 38,521 inhabitants (19,392 men and 19,129 women). Of these, 28,232 (73.3%) lived in urban areas and 10,289 (26.7%) in rural areas. The population grew by 8% (2,847 persons) between the 1992 and 2002 censuses.

== Administration ==
As a commune, Molina is a third-level administrative division of Chile administered by a municipal council, headed by an alcalde who is directly elected every four years.

Within the electoral divisions of Chile, Molina is represented in the Chamber of Deputies by Roberto León (PDC) and Celso Morales (UDI) as part of the 36th electoral district, together with Curicó, Teno, Romeral, Sagrada Familia, Hualañé, Licantén, Vichuquén and Rauco. The commune is represented in the Senate by Juan Antonio Coloma Correa (UDI) and Andrés Zaldívar Larraín (PDC) as part of the 10th senatorial constituency (Maule-North).

== Notable people ==
- Laureano Ladrón de Guevara (1889–1968), painter, printmaker and muralist
- Francisca Benítez (born 1974) visual artist and activist

== Climate ==
Climate data for Molina
Month	Jan	Feb	Mar	Apr	May	Jun	Jul	Aug	Sep	Oct	Nov	Dec	Year
Mean daily maximum °C (°F)	29.2 (84.6)	28.3 (82.9)	25.9 (78.6)	21.7 (71.1)	16.2 (61.2)	14.0 (57.2)	13.1 (55.6)	14.1 (57.4)	17.9 (64.2)	21.4 (70.5)	24.6 (76.3)	27.6 (81.7)	21.2 (70.1)
Daily mean °C (°F)	19.9 (67.8)	19.4 (66.9)	16.3 (61.3)	12.5 (54.5)	9.8 (49.6)	7.9 (46.2)	6.8 (44.2)	7.9 (46.2)	10.5 (50.9)	13.2 (55.8)	16.1 (61.0)	19.2 (66.6)	13.3 (55.9)
Mean daily minimum °C (°F)	10.6 (51.1)	10.0 (50.0)	8.2 (46.8)	5.8 (42.4)	5.1 (41.2)	3.4 (38.1)	2.6 (36.7)	2.5 (36.5)	4.5 (40.1)	6.1 (43.0)	8.1 (46.6)	9.7 (49.5)	6.4 (43.5)
Average precipitation mm (inches)	7.9 (0.31)	10.6 (0.42)	13.7 (0.54)	42.0 (1.65)	156.1 (6.15)	234.8 (9.24)	187.4 (7.38)	128.1 (5.04)	65.2 (2.57)	45.3 (1.78)	20.3 (0.80)	9.1 (0.36)	62 (2.4)
Average relative humidity (%)	62	65	72	80	87	91	89	88	84	78	73	65	78
Source: Bioclimatografia de Chile
