= Lontué River =

River in Chile

Maule cuenca

The Lontué River is a river in the province of Curicó in Chile. It originates about 50 km east of Curicó, at the confluence of the Colorado River and the Los Patos River. Both rivers have their origin next to the volcanos Descabezado Chico and Descabezado Grande. The Lontué River forms the Mataquito River at the union with the Teno River that runs to the north, about 10 kilometers west of Curicó near the locality of Sagrada Familia.

== Sources ==
- Cuenca del río Mataquito
