= Jorge Álvarez (Chilean footballer) =

Chilean footballer (born 1990)

Personal information
- Full name: Jorge Eduardo Álvarez Guerrero
- Date of birth: May 30, 1990 (age 36)
- Place of birth: Curicó, Chile
- Height: 1.80 m (5 ft 11 in)
- Positions: Midfielder; winger

Senior career*
Years	Team	Apps	(Gls)
2010–2013	Curicó Unido	41	(0)
2013–2014	Colchagua	7	(0)
2014–2015	Deportes Santa Cruz		
- * Club domestic league appearances and goals

Jorge Eduardo Álvarez Guerrero (born May 30, 1990), commonly known as Koke Álvarez, is a Chilean former footballer who played as a midfielder or winger.

== Career ==
He began his career as a youth player (U-14, U-16, U-20) in Club Deportivo Universidad Católica, one of the biggest teams in Chile. At the beginning of 2010, he joined Curicó Unido as one of the young talents in the squad. Right now, he is still playing with the Chilean Primera División B Clausura 2011 under the lead manager Raúl Toro Fuenzalida.

== National team ==
Jorge was part of the National Team U-15 in 2004.
