= Teno, Chile =

Teno
- City and Commune
- Coat of arms Map of Teno commune in the Maule Region Location in Chile
- Coordinates (city): 34°52′S 71°11′W
- Country: Chile
- Region: Maule
- Province: Curicó

Government
  - Type: Municipality
  - Alcalde: Sandra Valenzuela Pérez (UDI)

Area
  - Total: 618.4 km^{2} (238.8 sq mi)
- Elevation: 252 m (827 ft)

Population (2012 Census)
  - Total: 27,532
  - Density: 44.52/km^{2} (115.3/sq mi)
  - Urban: 6,729
  - Rural: 18,867

Sex
  - Men: 13,298
  - Women: 12,298
- Time zone: UTC-4 (CLT)
  - Summer (DST): UTC-3 (CLST)
- Area code: 56 + 75
- Website: Municipality of Teno

Teno is a Chilean city and commune in the Curicó Province, Maule Region. A large percentage of inhabitants are of mestizo and Mapuche Indian origin. The main economy is agricultural farming and livestock raising, often by huasos or Chilean cowhands and shepherds.

== Demographics ==
According to the 2002 census of the National Statistics Institute, Teno spans an area of 618.4 km^{2} (239 sq mi) and has 25,596 inhabitants (13,298 men and 12,298 women). Of these, 6,729 (26.3%) lived in urban areas and 18,867 (73.7%) in rural areas. The population grew by 6.3% (1,506 persons) between the 1992 and 2002 censuses.

== Administration ==
As a commune, Teno is a third-level administrative division of Chile administered by a municipal council, headed by an alcalde who is directly elected every four years. The 2008-2012 alcalde is Sandra Valenzuela Pérez (UDI).

Within the electoral divisions of Chile, Teno is represented in the Chamber of Deputies by Roberto León (PDC) and Celso Morales (UDI) as part of the 36th electoral district, together with Curicó, Romeral, Molina, Sagrada Familia, Hualañé, Licantén, Vichuquén and Rauco. The commune is represented in the Senate by Juan Antonio Coloma Correa (UDI) and Andrés Zaldívar Larraín (PDC) as part of the 10th senatorial constituency (Maule-North).
