= Claro River (Teno) =

Coordinates: 34.9972°S 70.8186°W

Location
- Country: Chile

Physical characteristics
- Source
  - location: Los Cajones River and Del Planchón River
- Mouth
  - location: Teno River

The Claro River is a river of Chile located in the Maule Region. It rises in the Andes, at the confluence of the Los Cajones River and Del Planchón River. It empties into the Teno River near the city of Los Queñes.

In February 1991, eruptions from the volcanic complex of Planchón-Peteroa (Planchón (3977 m) and Peteroa (4101 m)) 35 km southeast Los Queñes contaminated the water and killed large numbers of fish.

It is the former training site of the U.S. Olympic slalom kayak team.

== See also ==
- List of rivers of Chile
