= Teno (Mataquito) =

Teno River
- Maule cuenca

Location
- Country: Chile

Physical characteristics
- Mouth
  - location: Mataquito River
- Length: 102 km (63 mi)
- Basin size: 1,590 km^{2} (610 sq mi)

The Teno (Spanish: Río Teno) is a river located in the Maule Region of central Chile. It begins at the confluence of the Malo and Nacimiento rivers. The former originates north of Planchón volcano at Lagunas de Teno. The river flows initially northwest across the Andes. At the locality of Los Queñes, the Teno is joined by the Claro River, which is fed by glaciers of Planchón-Peteroa complex.

Shortly after being crossed by the Pan-American Highway and by Chile's main railroad, the Teno River turns its course southwestward until it meets the Lontué River, about 10 kilometers west of Curicó near the locality of Sagrada Familia, forming the Mataquito River.

Rio Teno watershed
