= Mataquito River =

River in Chile

Coordinates: 34.9722°S 72.1858°W

Maule cuenca

Mataquito is a river located in the Province of Curicó, Maule Region of Chile and formed by the union of rivers Teno and Lontué about 10 kilometers west of Curicó near the locality of Sagrada Familia and empties into the Pacific Ocean south of the town of Iloca, Licantén.

== Sources ==
- Cuenca del río Mataquito
