= Romeral =

- Town and Commune
- Map of Romeral commune in the Maule Region Location in Chile
- Coordinates (city): 34°56′S 71°19′W
- Country: Chile
- Region: Maule
- Province: Curicó

Government
  - Type: Municipality
  - Alcalde: Carlos Vergara Zerega (PS)

Area
  - Total: 1,597.1 km^{2} (616.6 sq mi)
- Elevation: 174 m (571 ft)

Population (2012 Census)
  - Total: 14,203
  - Density: 8.8930/km^{2} (23.033/sq mi)
  - Urban: 3,675
  - Rural: 9,032

Sex
  - Men: 6,596
  - Women: 6,111
- Time zone: UTC-4 (CLT)
  - Summer (DST): UTC-3 (CLST)
- Area code: 56 + 75
- Website: Municipality of Romeral

Romeral is a Chilean town and commune in Curicó Province, Maule Region. The commune spans and area of 1,597.1 km^{2} (617 sq mi).

== Demographics ==
According to the 2002 census of Population and Housing by the National Statistics Institute, the Romeral commune had 12,707 inhabitants; of these, 3,675 (28.9%) lived in urban areas and 9,032 (71.1%) in rural areas. At that time, there were 6,596 men and 6,111 women. The population grew by 10.6% (1,217 persons) between the 1992 and 2002 censuses.

== Administration ==
As a commune, Romeral is a third-level administrative division of Chile administered by a municipal council, headed by an alcalde who is directly elected every four years. The 2008-2012 alcalde is Carlos Cisterna Negrete (PDC).

Within the electoral divisions of Chile, Romeral is represented in the Chamber of Deputies by Roberto León (PDC) and Celso Morales (UDI) as part of the 36th electoral district, together with Curicó, Teno, Molina, Sagrada Familia, Hualañé, Licantén, Vichuquén and Rauco. The commune is represented in the Senate by Juan Antonio Coloma Correa (UDI) and Andrés Zaldívar Larraín (PDC) as part of the 10th senatorial constituency (Maule-North).
