= Planchón-Peteroa =

Mountain in Argentina

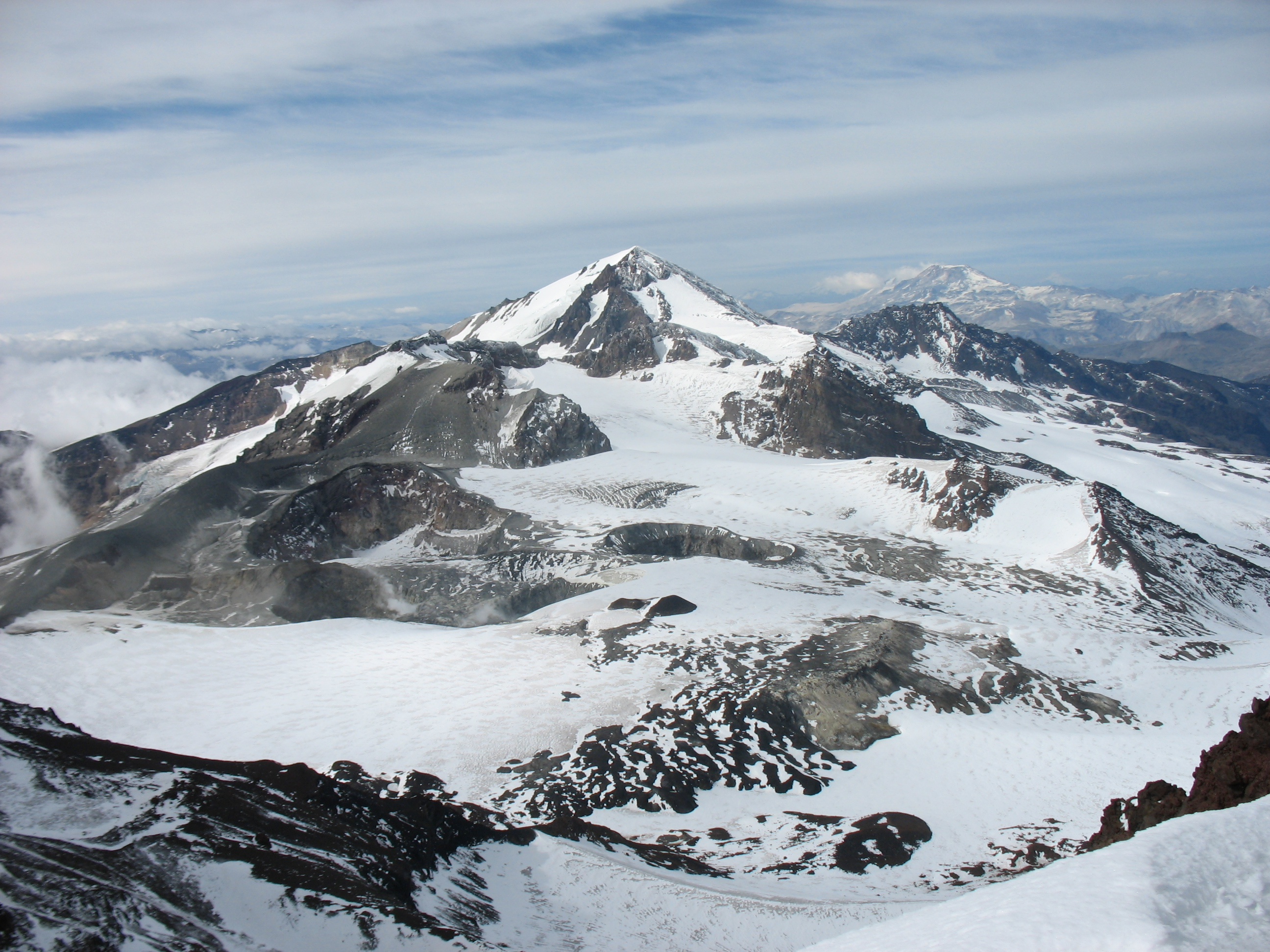
- Peteroa as seen from the summit of Planchón.

Highest point
- Elevation: 4,107 m (13,474 ft)
- Coordinates: 35°14′24″S 70°34′12″W

Geography
- Location within Argentina
- Location: Argentina-Chile
- Parent range: Andes

Geology
- Mountain type: Complex volcano
- Last eruption: October 2025

Planchón-Peteroa is a complex volcano extending in a north–south direction along the border between Argentina and Chile. It consists of volcanoes of various ages with several overlapping calderas. Those include Volcán Planchón, Volcán Peteroa and Volcán Azufre.

A partial collapse of the complex about 11,500 years ago produced a major debris avalanche, which followed the course of the Teno River until reaching the Chile Central Valley.

Peteroa has a crater lake. Lagunas de Teno lies at the foot of Planchón volcano. In this area also is the Vergara International Pass.

== September 6, 2010 eruption ==
Planchón-Peteroa Volcano erupted on September 6, followed by a stronger eruption on September 18. On September 21, the volcano erupted once again, emitting a dark gray plume of volcanic ash. As winds blew the ash southeast into Argentina, residents there were warned by authorities to evacuate the nearby areas before Planchón-Peteroa would erupt again.

== See also ==
- List of volcanoes in Argentina
- List of volcanoes in Chile
- Descabezado Grande
- Las Leñas
