= Curicó Province =

Curicó Province Provincia de Curicó
- Province
- Seal

- Location in the Maule Region

- Location in Chile
- Coordinates: 34°57′S 71°06′W
- Country: Chile
- Region: Maule
- Capital: Curicó
- Communes: List of 9: Curicó; Hualañé; Licantén; Molina; Rauco; Romeral; Sagrada Familia; Teno; Vichuquén

Government
  - Type: Provincial
  - Presidential Provincial Delegate: José Patricio Correa Sánchez (Radical Party)

Area
  - Total: 7,280.9 km^{2} (2,811.2 sq mi)

Population (2012 Census)
  - Total: 266,457
  - Density: 36.597/km^{2} (94.785/sq mi)
  - Urban: 157,876
  - Rural: 86,177

Sex
  - Men: 122,835
  - Women: 121,218
- Time zone: UTC-4 (CLT)
  - Summer (DST): UTC-3 (CLST)
- Area code: 56 + 75
- Website: Government of Curicó

Curicó Province (Spanish: Provincia de Curicó) is one of four provinces of the central Chilean region of Maule (VII). Its capital is the city of Curicó. It lies between the provinces of Colchagua and Talca and extends from the Pacific to the Argentine frontier, spanning an area of 7,280.9 km^{2} (2,811 sq mi). According to the 2002 census, the population was 244,053.

== Administration ==
As a province, Curicó is a second-level administrative division of Chile, governed by a provincial delegate who is appointed by the president.

=== Communes ===
The province is composed of nine communes, each governed by a municipality consisting of an alcalde and municipal council.

- Curicó
- Hualañé
- Licantén
- Molina
- Rauco
- Romeral
- Sagrada Familia
- Teno
- Vichuquén

== History ==
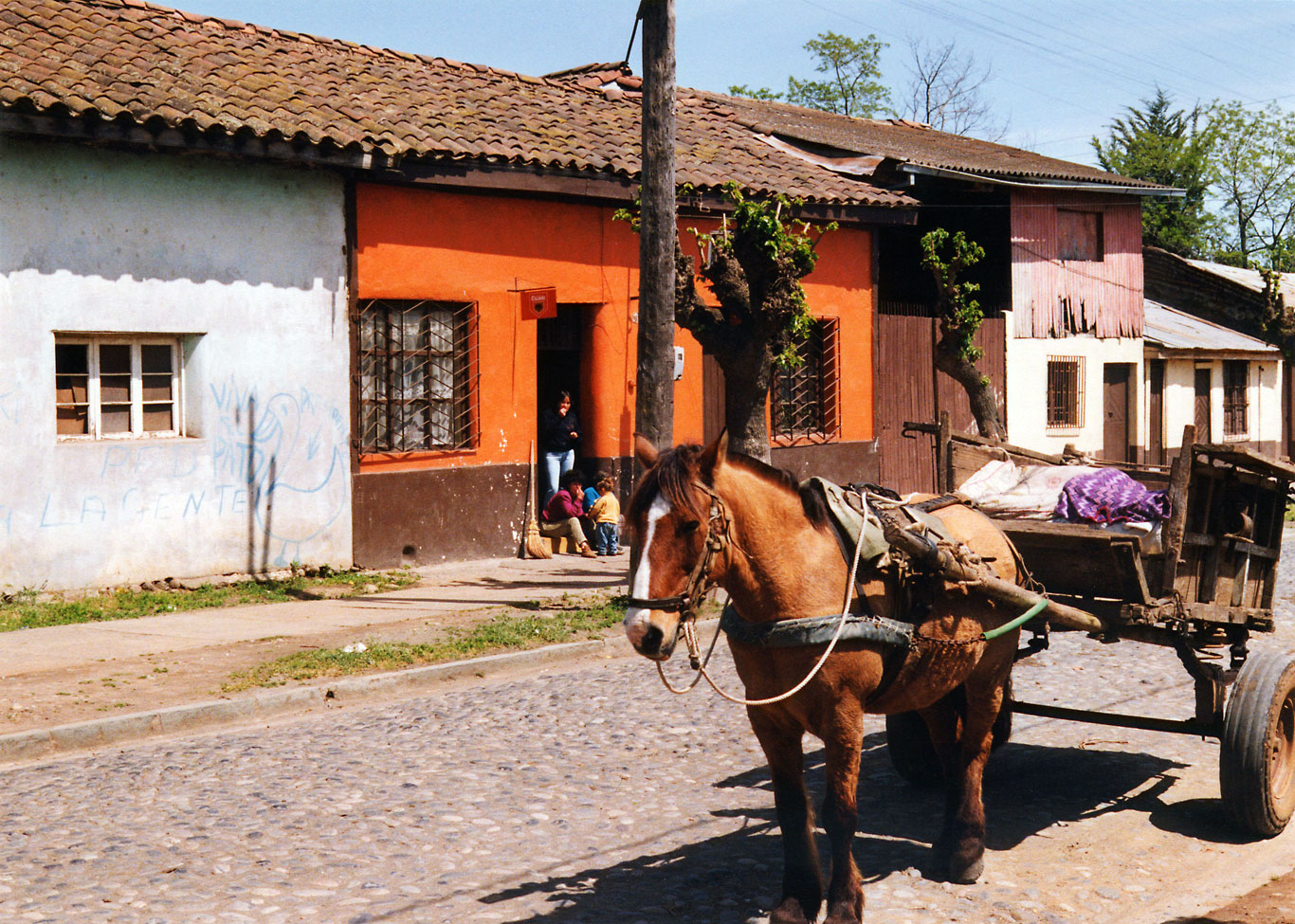
Molina, Curicó province

The region is named for the Curis, one of the tribes of Picunche or Promaucaes settled along the rivers of the central valley flowing into the Mataquito River, around the modern city of Curicó. Others tribes were the Tenu along the Teno River (the modern Rauco and Teno communes) to the north. To the south were the Gualemo along the Lontué River the modern Molina commune. Along the Mataquito were the tribes centered on the modern towns of Palquibudi in Sagrada Familia commune, La Huerta in Hualañé commune and Lora in Licantén commune. On the coast north of the river, the Vichuquén in the commune of the same name.

The province was created in 1865. Formerly it was part of the Colchagua Province. In 1974, because of a regionalisation process in Chile during the Augusto Pinochet regime executed by CONARA (Comisión Nacional de Reforma Administrativa in Spanish, National Commission of Administrative Reform in English), the province was reshaped, taking place in the recently created Maule Region.

== Geography and ecology ==
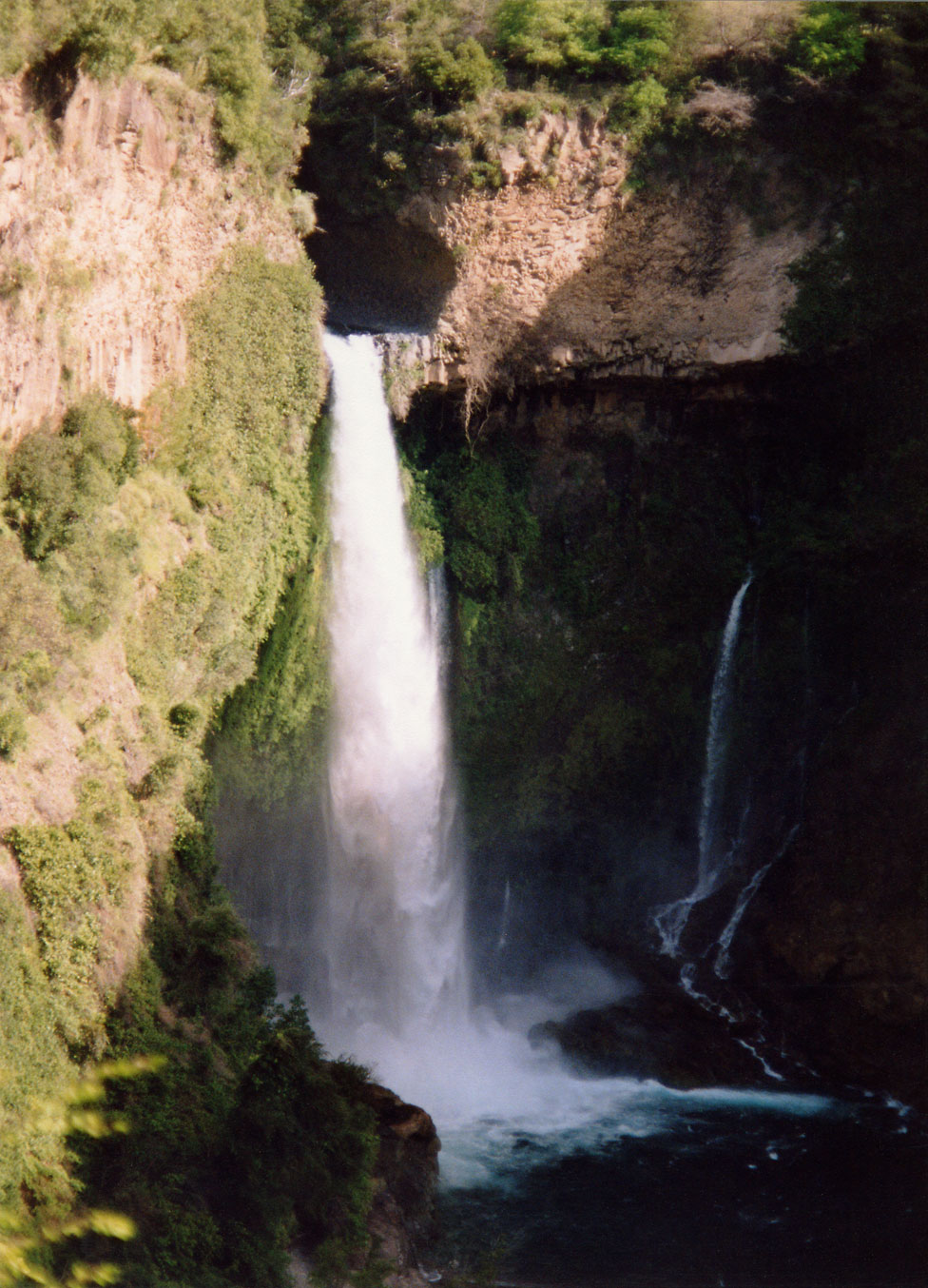
Inside of the Chilean Central Valley, Bride's Veil Waterfall

The eastern and western sections of Curicó Province are mountainous, and are separated by the fertile valley of central Chile. The provincial capital is Curicó, on the Mataquito River, 194 km south of Santiago. In some of the mountainous areas of the province is found the endangered Chilean Wine Palm, Jubaea chilensis, whose southern range is generally defined by the northern Maule Region, e.g. Curicó Province; historically, this endemic Chilean palm had a much wider distribution.

== Demography ==
According to the 2002 census by the National Statistics Institute (INE), the province spans an area of 7,280.9 km^{2} (2,811 sq mi) and had a population of 244,053 inhabitants (122,835 men and 121,218 women), giving it a population density of 33.5/km^{2} (87/sq mi). Between the 1992 and 2002 censuses, the population grew by 10.6% (23,396 persons).

== Curicó Valley wine region ==
Curicó Valley is a wine-producing region in Chile's Central Valley and a Denomination of Origin (DO) as defined by the Chilean Appellation system, the legally defined and protected geographical indication used to identify where the grapes for a wine were grown. This area is located 200 km (124 miles) south of Santiago, Chile's capital city, at 35°S, a similar latitude to the southern tip of Spain. It is divided in two sub-regions: the Teno valley in the north and Lontue in the south. Wine production in this area is known for the variety of grapes, reliability and good value Cabernet Sauvignon and Sauvignon Blanc.

Although European vines have been growing in the Curicó area since the mid-1800s, the modern wine production in Curicó began in the late 1970s when Spanish wine maker Miguel Torres decided to explore the capabilities of this area, bringing new technologies such as stainless steel tanks that are now very common in Chilean wine industry. Torres' endeavour encouraged foreign investment which led to increased plantings and exploration of suitable grape varieties for the area. Today Curicó Valley is today one of the most productive wine regions in Chile. The valley's climate is varied. The eastern part near the Andes is cooler than the western side due to the breezes coming down from the mountains, and most of the biggest producers are located in this area of Curicó and in Molina. At the western end, the coastal range protects the valley from the ocean influence. Curicó Valley is planted with more grape varieties than anywhere else in Chile, but the dominant varieties are Cabernet Sauvignon and Sauvignon Blanc. Curicó may have yet to produce a Cabernet Sauvignon to rival Maipo's red wines and its Sauvignon Blanc still does not match the fresh, complex style found in Casablanca, but the valley is one of Chile's workhorse regions and its output is consistent and reliable.

=== Grape distribution by variety ===
- Climate: Mediterranean climate. 650mm/27.4 in of rain per year..
- Soils: clay, sand, decomposed granite.
- Primary grapes: Cabernet, Syrah, Carménère, Sauvignon Blanc.

Cabernet Sauvignon: 3,848 ha (9509 acres)	Sauvignon Blanc: 3,221 ha (7959 acres)	Carmenere: 944 ha (2333 acres)
Sauvignon Vert: 532 ha (1315 acres)	Merlot: 1,628 ha (4023 acres)	Chardonnay: 1,090 ha (2693 acres)

- Total hectares planted: 1484 ha (3667 acres).

== See also ==
- Miguel A. Torres

== Sources ==
- Thomas Guevara, Historia de Curicó, Alicante : Biblioteca Virtual Miguel de Cervantes, 2000 Originally published in 1891.
- C. Michael Hogan (2008) Chilean Wine Palm: Jubaea chilensis, GlobalTwitcher.com, ed. Nicklas Stromberg
