= General Freire Airport =

- IATA: none; ICAO: SCIC

Summary
- Airport type: Public
- Serves: Curicó, Chile
- Elevation AMSL: 722 ft / 220 m
- Coordinates: 34°57′55″S 71°12′58″W

Map
- Location of General Freire Airport in Chile

Runways
Direction	Length		Surface
Direction	m	ft	Surface
01/19	845	2,772	Asphalt
- Source: Landings.com Google Maps GCM

General Freire Airport (Spanish: Aeródromo General Freire, IATA: ZCQ, ICAO: SCIC) is an airport serving Curicó, a city in the Maule Region of Chile. The airport is within the northeast part of the city.

Runway 01 has an 85 metres (279 ft) displaced threshold.

The Curico non-directional beacon (Ident: ICO) is located 2.1 nautical miles (3.9 km) west-southwest of the airport. The Curico VOR-DME (Ident: ICO) is located on the field.

== See also ==
- Transport in Chile
- List of airports in Chile
