= Vichuquén =

- Commune
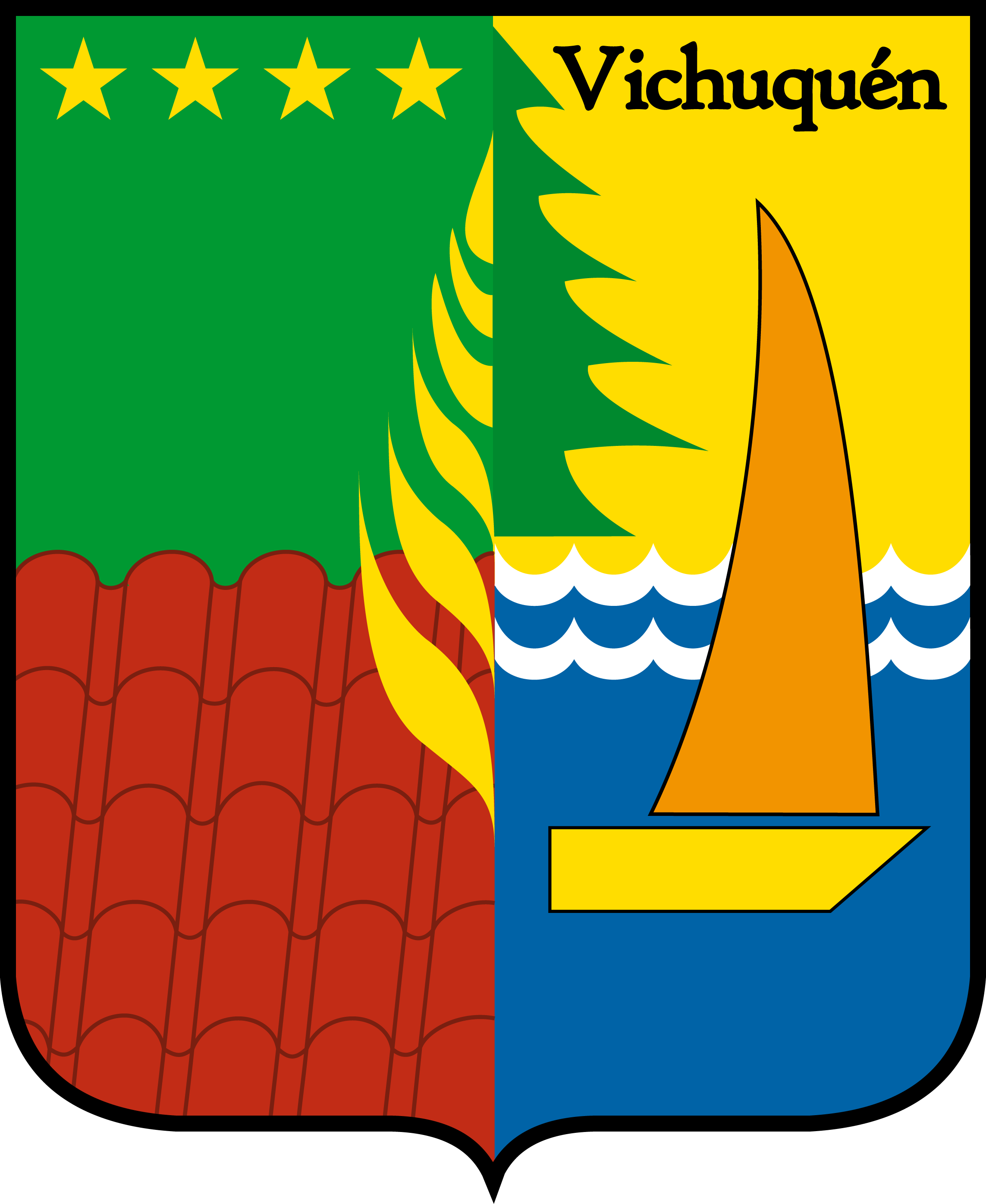
- Coat of arms Map of Vichuquén commune in the Maule Region Location in Chile
- Coordinates (city): 34°53′S 72°00′W
- Country: Chile
- Region: Maule
- Province: Curicó

Government
  - Type: Municipality
  - Alcalde: Román Pavez López (PPD)

Area
  - Total: 425.7 km^{2} (164.4 sq mi)
- Elevation: 72 m (236 ft)

Population (2012 Census)
  - Total: 4,335
  - Density: 10.18/km^{2} (26.37/sq mi)
  - Urban: 1,368
  - Rural: 3,548

Sex
  - Men: 2,596
  - Women: 2,320
- Time zone: UTC-4 (CLT)
  - Summer (DST): UTC-3 (CLST)
- Area code: 56 + 75
- Website: municipalidaddevichuquen.cl

Vichuquén is a commune in the Curicó Province of Chile's Maule Region.

== History ==
The Spanish arrived along the Lico rivers in 1585, where settlements of the Mapuche and Inca already existed. In 1865, Vichuquén founded its capital of the village of the same name. In 1987, the old part of the town was declared a "Typical Zone Vichuquén" for its colonial style architecture.

== Geography ==
Vichuquén is located northwest of the Curicó Province. It also has the Vichuquén lakes Lago Vichuquén (es) in its boundaries, as well as the Laguna Torca National Reserve. The commune spans an area of 425.7 km^{2} (164 sq mi).

== Demographics ==
According to the 2002 census of the National Statistics Institute, Vichuquén spans an area of 425.7 km^{2} (164 sq mi) and has 4,916 inhabitants (2,596 men and 2,320 women). Of these, 1,368 (27.8%) lived in urban areas and 3,548 (72.2%) in rural areas. The population fell by 0.3% (15 persons) between the 1992 and 2002 censuses.

== Administration ==
As a commune, Vichuquén is a third-level administrative division of Chile administered by a municipal council, headed by an alcalde who is directly elected every four years. The 2008-2012 alcalde is Román Pavez López (PPD).

Within the electoral divisions of Chile, Vichuquén is represented in the Chamber of Deputies by Roberto León (PDC) and Celso Morales (UDI) as part of the 36th electoral district, together with Curicó, Teno, Romeral, Molina, Sagrada Familia, Hualañé, Licantén and Rauco. The commune is represented in the Senate by Juan Antonio Coloma Correa (UDI) and Andrés Zaldívar Larraín (PDC) as part of the 10th senatorial constituency (Maule-North).
