= Sagrada Familia, Chile =

Sagrada Familia
- Commune
- Coat of arms Map of Sagrada Familia commune in the Maule Region Location in Chile
- Coordinates (city): 35°00′S 71°23′W
- Country: Chile
- Region: Maule
- Province: Curicó

Government
  - Type: Municipality
  - Alcalde: Francisco Meléndez Rojas (PS)

Area
  - Total: 548.8 km^{2} (211.9 sq mi)
- Elevation: 143 m (469 ft)

Population (2012 Census)
  - Total: 17,569
  - Density: 32.01/km^{2} (82.91/sq mi)
  - Urban: 5,080
  - Rural: 12,439

Sex
  - Men: 9,108
  - Women: 8,411
- Time zone: UTC-4 (CLT)
  - Summer (DST): UTC-3 (CLST)
- Area code: 56 + 75
- Website: Municipality of Sagrada Familia

Sagrada Familia (Spanish meaning "Holy Family") is a Chilean town and commune in Curicó Province, Maule Region.

== Demographics ==
According to the 2002 census of the National Statistics Institute, Sagrada Familia spans an area of 548.8 km^{2} (212 sq mi) and has 17,519 inhabitants (9,108 men and 8,411 women). Of these, 5,080 (29%) lived in urban areas and 12,439 (71%) in rural areas. The population grew by 3.7% (625 persons) between the 1992 and 2002 censuses.

== Administration ==
As a commune, Sagrada Familia is a third-level administrative division of Chile administered by a municipal council, headed by an alcalde who is directly elected every four years. The 2008-2012 alcalde is Francisco Meléndez Rojas (PS).

Within the electoral divisions of Chile, Sagrada Familia is represented in the Chamber of Deputies by Roberto León (PDC) and Celso Morales (UDI) as part of the 36th electoral district, together with Curicó, Teno, Romeral, Molina, Hualañé, Licantén, Vichuquén and Rauco. The commune is represented in the Senate by Juan Antonio Coloma Correa (UDI) and Andrés Zaldívar Larraín (PDC) as part of the 10th senatorial constituency (Maule-North).
