= Licantén =

- Commune
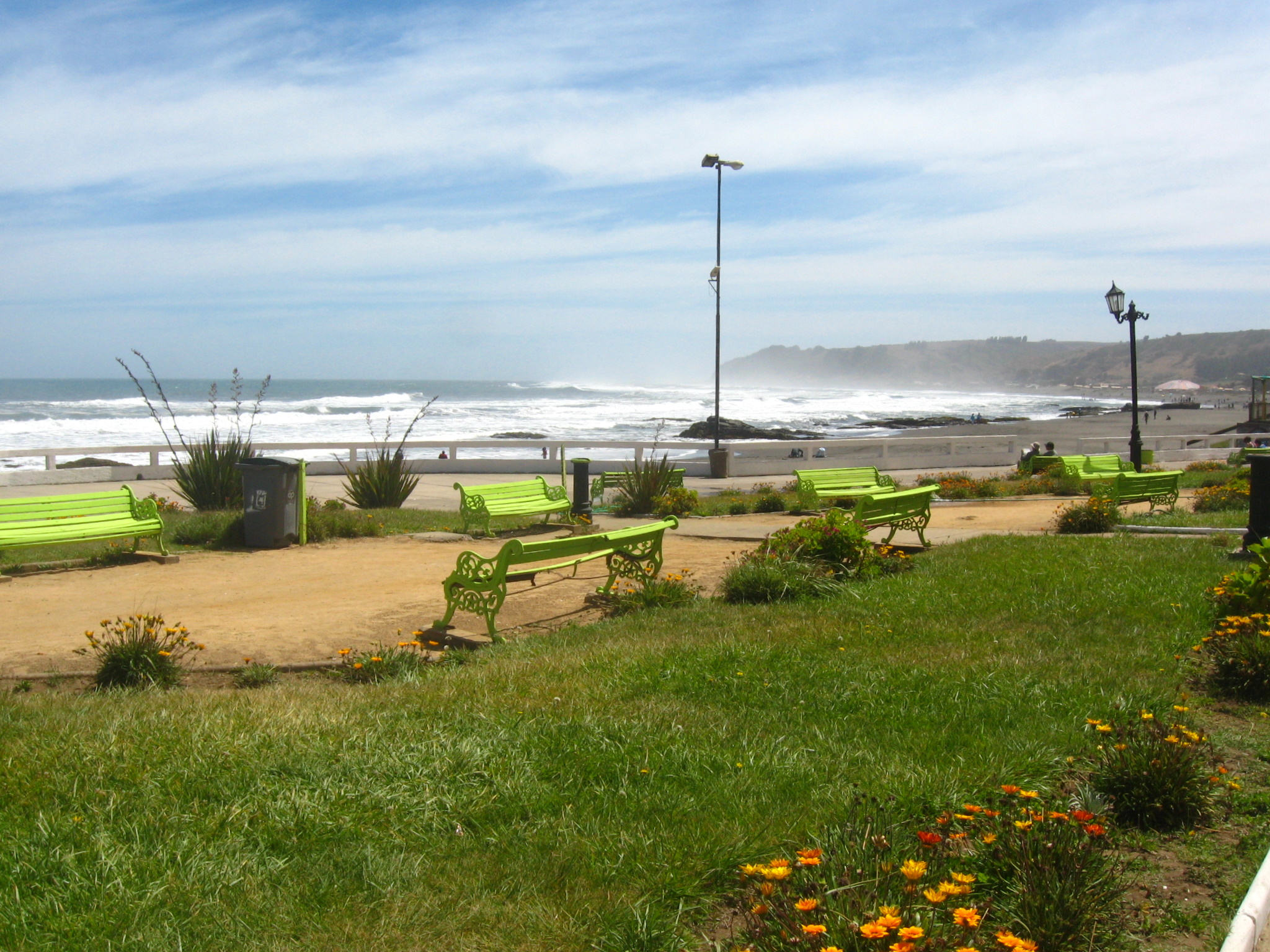
- Iloca

- Coat of arms Map of Licantén commune in the Maule Region Location in Chile
- Coordinates (city): 34°59′S 72°00′W
- Country: Chile
- Region: Maule
- Province: Curicó

Government
  - Type: Municipality
  - Alcalde: Héctor Quiero Palacios (UDI)

Area
  - Total: 273.3 km^{2} (105.5 sq mi)
- Elevation: 5 m (16 ft)

Population (2012 Census)
  - Total: 6,689
  - Density: 24.47/km^{2} (63.39/sq mi)
  - Urban: 3,974
  - Rural: 2,928

Sex
  - Men: 3,654
  - Women: 3,248
- Time zone: UTC-4 (CLT)
  - Summer (DST): UTC-3 (CLST)
- Area code: 56 + 75
- Website: Municipality of Licantén

Licantén is a town within the Licantén commune, administered by the Municipality of Licantén within the Curicó Province in the Maule Region of Chile. The commune also include the coastal town of Iloca.

== Demographics ==
According to the 2002 census of the National Statistics Institute, Licantén spans an area of 273.3 km^{2} (106 sq mi) and has 6,902 inhabitants (3,654 men and 3,248 women). Of these, 3,974 (57.6%) lived in urban areas and 2,928 (42.4%) in rural areas. The population grew by 8.8% (557 persons) between the 1992 and 2002 censuses.

== Administration ==
As a commune, Licantén is a third-level administrative division of Chile administered by a municipal council, headed by an alcalde who is directly elected every four years. The 2008-2012 alcalde is Héctor Quiero Palacios (UDI).

Within the electoral divisions of Chile, Licantén is represented in the Chamber of Deputies by Roberto León (PDC) and Celso Morales (UDI) as part of the 36th electoral district, together with Curicó, Teno, Romeral, Molina, Sagrada Familia, Hualañé, Vichuquén and Rauco. The commune is represented in the Senate by Juan Antonio Coloma Correa (UDI) and Andrés Zaldívar Larraín (PDC) as part of the 10th senatorial constituency (Maule-North).

== See also ==
- Chilean Wine Palm
