= Curicó =

- City and Commune
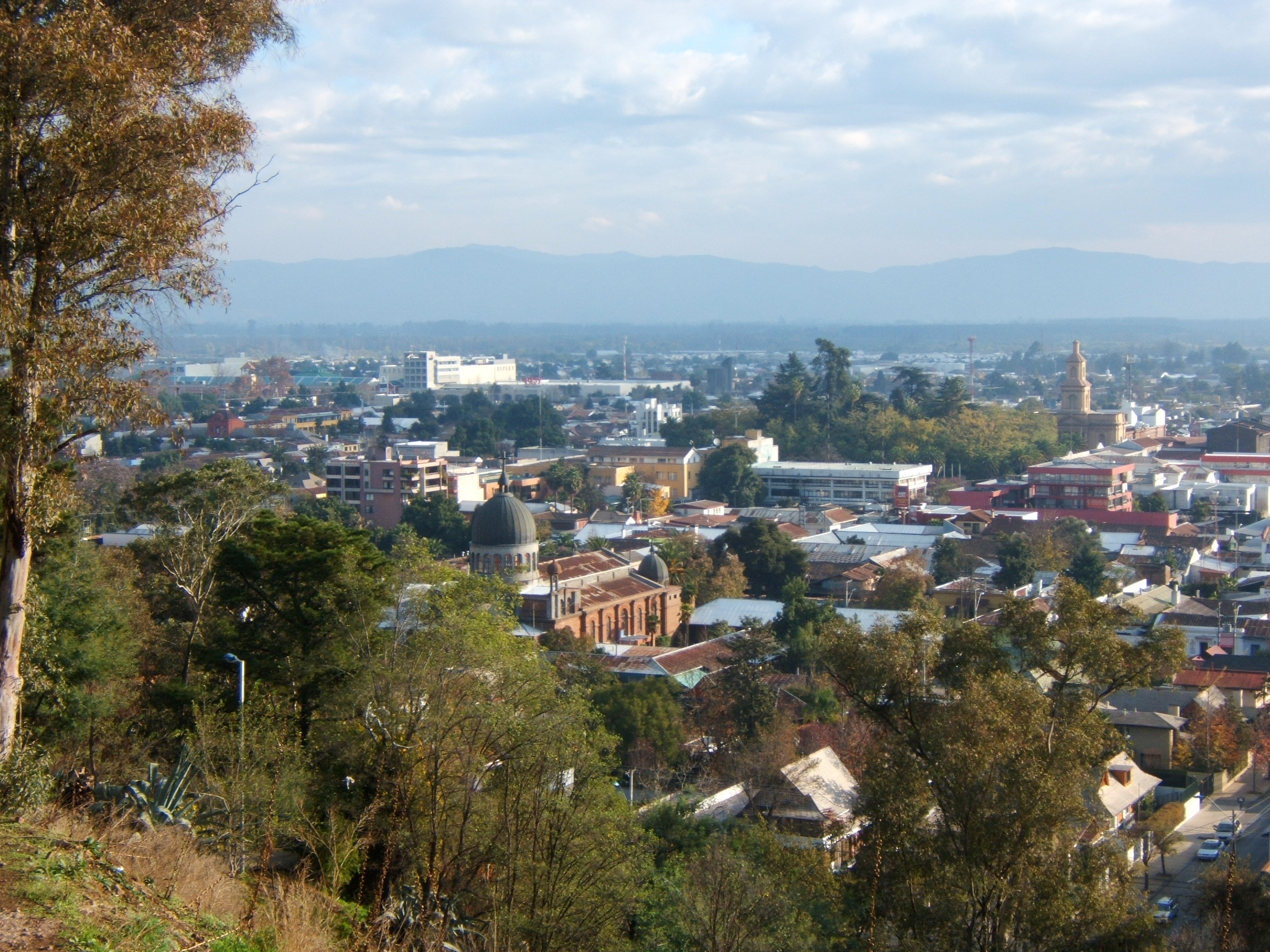
- Curico from Condell Hill

- Coat of arms Map of Curicó commune in the Maule Region Location in Chile
- Motto: " Noble y Leal Villa de San José de Buena Vista de Curicó"; Noble and Loyal Villa of San José de Buena Vista from Curicó
- Coordinates (city): 34°59′S 71°14′W
- Country: Chile
- Region: Maule
- Province: Curicó
- San José de Buena Vista de Curicó: October 9, 1743

Government
  - Type: Municipality
  - Alcalde: George Bordachar

Area
  - Total: 1,328.4 km^{2} (512.9 sq mi)
- Elevation: 228 m (748 ft)

Population (2012 Census)
  - Total: 136,954
  - Density: 103.10/km^{2} (267.02/sq mi)
  - Urban: 100,506
  - Rural: 19,079
- Demonym: Curican

Sex
  - Men: 58,768
  - Women: 70,817
- Time zone: UTC-4 (CLT)
  - Summer (DST): UTC-3 (CLST)
- Postal code: 3349001
- Area code: 56 + 75
- Climate: Csb
- Website: Official website (in Spanish)

Curicó (Spanish pronunciation: [kuri'ko]) is a city located in Chile's central valley and serves as the capital of the Curicó Province, which is part of the Maule Region. Positioned between the provinces of Colchagua and Talca, the region stretches from the Pacific Ocean to the border with Argentina.

The city is known for its distinctive products such as cakes, fruits, cement, sugar, tomato sauce, and high-quality export wines. It serves as a major service hub in the central region and is considered Chile's agro-industrial capital due to its consistent economic growth.

== Etymology ==
Curicó means "black waters" in Mapudungun, originally meaning "land of black water".

== Coat of arms ==
The city's symbol is a heraldic emblem representing the esteemed civic traditions of Curicó's early Spanish settlers. It features a silver knight on a black horse, set against a green field, slaying a golden serpent. The lower part carries the phrase "Noble and Loyal Villa de San José de Buenavista de Curicó," while the upper part displays a golden mural crown.

This coat of arms is a modification of the emblem of field marshal Lorenzo de Labra y Corvalán de Castilla, the landowner where the city's original and modern structures were erected. The Spanish colony was on the verge of adopting this symbol when the War of Independence broke out.

Ahead of Curicó's bicentennial, the Spanish community conducted a thorough study and successfully recovered the coat of arms, whose model is housed in the National Historical Museum in Santiago. On 2 September 1943, a month before the city's anniversary, the municipal council, led by Mayor Carlos Castro, officially declared this coat of arms as the city's emblem.

The coat of arms of the Curicó commune is used in internal and public ceremonies involving the Curicó Municipality. It is also utilized in public events organized by city institutions. Additionally, it serves as an essential element in all official documentation of the municipality, as well as in seals and stamps of the corporation.

== History ==
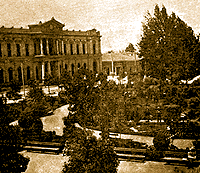
The central square of Curico in 1901, the most famous image of Curico.

The city of Curicó was originally inhabited by the indigenous Curis ("black"), named after the color of their lands near streams and wetlands.

Founded as San José de Buena Vista de Curicó on 9 October 1743, through donations from residents like Captain Pedro Nolasco Solorza and Mónica Donoso y Navarro, widow of Labra, under the authorization of José Antonio Manso de Velasco, governor of Chile and later viceroy of Peru.

In 1747, Governor Domingo Ortiz de Rozas relocated the city 3 kilometers east due to excessive humidity. However, it didn't thrive until after the 1751 earthquake forced the inhabitants of the old town to move.

Despite its strategic location, the city struggled with a small population and conservative influences from local convents and aristocratic families.

The oldest and most valuable building of the city is La Iglesia San Francisco ("San Francisco's Church"), built in 1734, and came to its current location in 1759.

Curicó gained city status in 1830. Luis Cruz Martínez, a Chilean military figure, is celebrated as the city's hero, and Curicó serves as a central hub for communication, commerce, and the economy of nearby agro-industries.

The 2010 Chilean Earthquake heavily impacted Curicó, causing the collapse of the historic district where sixty percent of houses and ninety percent of the district remain unreconstructed. Examples include the phased inauguration of the San José de Curicó Hospital.

Curicó is known for its strong local identity, fostered by a good neighborhood atmosphere, hero Luis Cruz Martínez, and its football club.

== Geography ==
Curicó is on the Guaiquillo River, 183 km (114 mi) south of Santiago along the route of the Chilean Central Railway. The city is situated in the fertile Chilean Central Valley, 228 m (748 ft) above sea-level, in the midst of a comparatively well-cultivated region. The eastern and western sides are mountainous, separated by the Chilean Central Valley. A volcano called Descabezado Grande can be seen from most parts at a distance of eighty kilometers. The commune spans an area of 1,328.4 km^{2} (513 sq mi).

The main rivers are the Lontué River and Teno River, which surround the city. The landscape is dominated by the Andes and Chilean Coastal Range.

=== Climate ===
Curicó has a warm-summer Mediterranean climate (Köppen climate classification Csb), relatively hot dry summers (November to March) with temperatures reaching 32 °C (90 °F) on the hottest days. Winters (June to August) are more humid, with typical maximum daily temperatures of 15 °C (59 °F). Mean rainfall is 855.98 mm (34 in) per year. In August 2007, Curicó experienced snowfall for the first time in over 60 years.

In the southern part of the valley the climate is more temperate and rainfall more abundant; the effects of this are to be seen in better pasturage. Irrigation is used to a large extent.

Climate data for Curicó (General Freire Airfield) 1991–2020, extremes 1950–present
Month	Jan	Feb	Mar	Apr	May	Jun	Jul	Aug	Sep	Oct	Nov	Dec	Year
Record high °C (°F)	37.3 (99.1)	37.4 (99.3)	35.2 (95.4)	32.2 (90.0)	27.5 (81.5)	21.7 (71.1)	22.8 (73.0)	25.9 (78.6)	29.6 (85.3)	31.7 (89.1)	36.6 (97.9)	36.6 (97.9)	37.4 (99.3)
Mean daily maximum °C (°F)	30.3 (86.5)	29.5 (85.1)	26.8 (80.2)	21.0 (69.8)	15.9 (60.6)	12.5 (54.5)	12.3 (54.1)	14.8 (58.6)	17.8 (64.0)	21.2 (70.2)	25.4 (77.7)	28.4 (83.1)	21.3 (70.3)
Daily mean °C (°F)	21.6 (70.9)	20.8 (69.4)	18.5 (65.3)	14.1 (57.4)	10.8 (51.4)	8.6 (47.5)	7.9 (46.2)	9.6 (49.3)	11.8 (53.2)	14.5 (58.1)	17.6 (63.7)	20.0 (68.0)	14.7 (58.5)
Mean daily minimum °C (°F)	12.8 (55.0)	12.0 (53.6)	10.2 (50.4)	7.2 (45.0)	5.7 (42.3)	4.6 (40.3)	3.5 (38.3)	4.4 (39.9)	5.8 (42.4)	7.7 (45.9)	9.8 (49.6)	11.7 (53.1)	8.0 (46.4)
Record low °C (°F)	−0.8 (30.6)	0.8 (33.4)	−2.0 (28.4)	−6.0 (21.2)	−8.1 (17.4)	−7.6 (18.3)	−9.8 (14.4)	−7.5 (18.5)	−7.4 (18.7)	−4.2 (24.4)	0.0 (32.0)	0.9 (33.6)	−9.8 (14.4)
Average precipitation mm (inches)	2.6 (0.10)	3.4 (0.13)	9.3 (0.37)	32.3 (1.27)	102.1 (4.02)	159.1 (6.26)	102.7 (4.04)	93.2 (3.67)	46.5 (1.83)	26.3 (1.04)	9.3 (0.37)	9.2 (0.36)	596.0 (23.46)
Average precipitation days (≥ 1.0 mm)	0.4	0.3	0.8	3.1	5.6	9.1	7.0	6.6	4.0	2.8	1.0	0.8	41.5
Average relative humidity (%)	51	54	60	71	81	86	84	79	73	66	58	53	68
Mean monthly sunshine hours	363.7	315.3	265.3	174.3	109.4	78.9	102.5	132.8	167.6	227.6	296.6	335.4	2,569.4
Source 1: Dirección Meteorológica de Chile (humidity 1970–2000)
Source 2: NOAA (precipitation days 1991–2020)

== Demographics ==
According to the 2012 census of the National Statistics Institute, Curicó spans an area of 1,328.4 km^{2} (513 sq mi) and has 147,017 inhabitants (68,768 men and 70,817 women). Of these, 130,506 (84%) lived in urban areas and 19,079 (16%) in rural areas. Between the 1992 and 2002 censuses, the population grew by 14.9% (15,472 persons).

== Economy ==
=== Primary sector ===
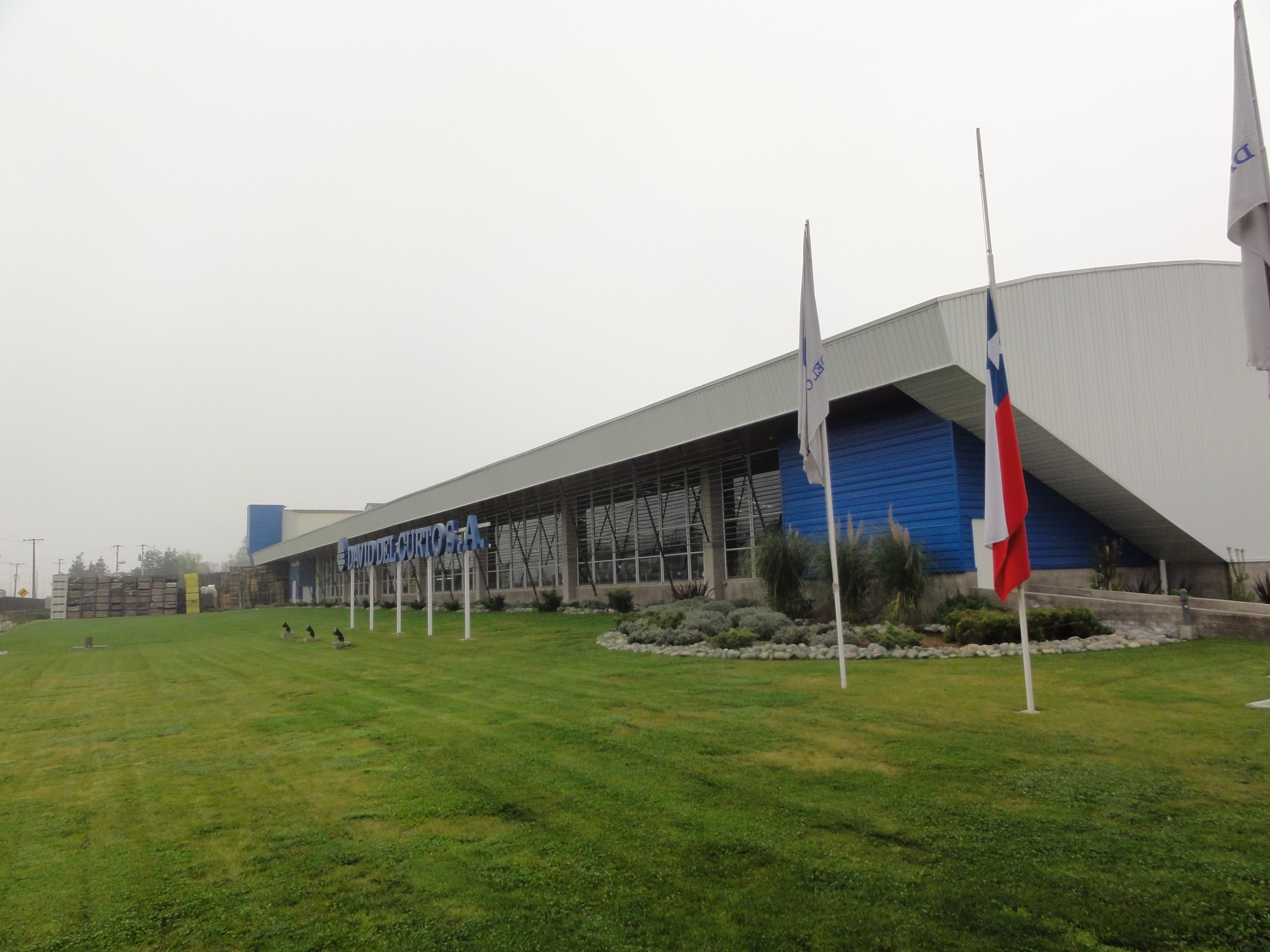
David del Curto Fruit Company.

The city's main economy relies heavily on agricultural activities, particularly large fruit plantations like apple orchards, cherry trees, vineyards, and kiwi farms, along with annual crops such as sugar beets, industrial tomatoes, wheat, corn, and fresh vegetables. Fruit-exporting companies like Agricom, Unifrutti, Copefrut, Del Monte, and others operate in the area. The city is also home to wineries like Viña San Pedro, Concha y Toro, and Santa Rita, producing wine for both domestic and international markets.

=== Secondary and tertiary sectors ===
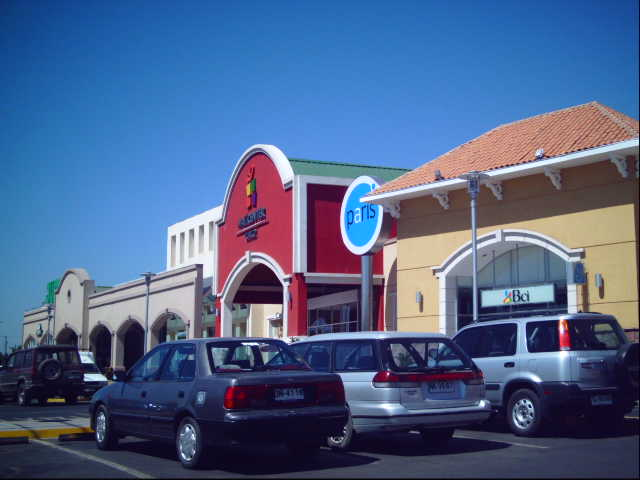
Mall Center Curicó.

In the tertiary sector, the city offers a full range of services, including financial institutions, transportation, department stores, professional institutes, universities, healthcare facilities, and entertainment options. In 2012, the country's largest particleboard panel plant, owned by Arauco, commenced operations.

In 2007, the region's major shopping center, Mall Curicó (105,000 m^{2}), owned by Inmobiliaria Mall Viña del Mar S.A., was inaugurated. Anchor stores like Ripley, París, Jumbo, and Easy attract visitors. The mall expanded in 2018, introducing the first H&M store between Santiago and Concepción. In 2019, a unique gastronomic boulevard opened, featuring stores like Burger King, Starbucks, Manarola, and La Serrana. The expansion also brought Cineplanet and the Apple product retail store MacOnline to the area.

In 2019, Mercado Quadra started operations, including the opening of a Tottus supermarket. Future plans include a gym by Energy and additional commercial spaces.

In 2018, Curicó had 5,562 registered companies. The Economic Complexity Index (ECI) for that year was 1.77. Key economic activities with high Revealed Comparative Advantage (RCA) indices were the Manufacture of Bituminous Mixtures (41.15), Production of Flower, Meadow, Fruit, and Vegetable Seeds (39.54), and Production in Nurseries, Except Forest Species (28.5).

== International Relations ==
The city of Curicó hosts a number of international relations institutions, such as the Internationalization Unit and International Center for Engineering Education of the Faculty of Engineering at the University of Talca, the Department of Migration and International Police of the Investigations Police of Chile, and the Office of Migratory Affairs of the Municipality of Curicó.

=== Consulates ===
- Spain (Honorary Consulate)

== Tourism and society ==
population trend
year	inhabitants
1895	12,669
1952	28,618
1960	34,646
1970	43,524
1982	63,658
1992	77,733
2002	119,585
2005	120,113

Curicó, a city characterized by its wine culture, hosts the Fiesta de la Vendimia ("Wine Harvest Festival") annually from March 15 to 20. This celebration reflects the rich tradition of Creole culture and the city's history, influenced by nearly five centuries of winemaking. Curicó boasts a wine route through the valley.

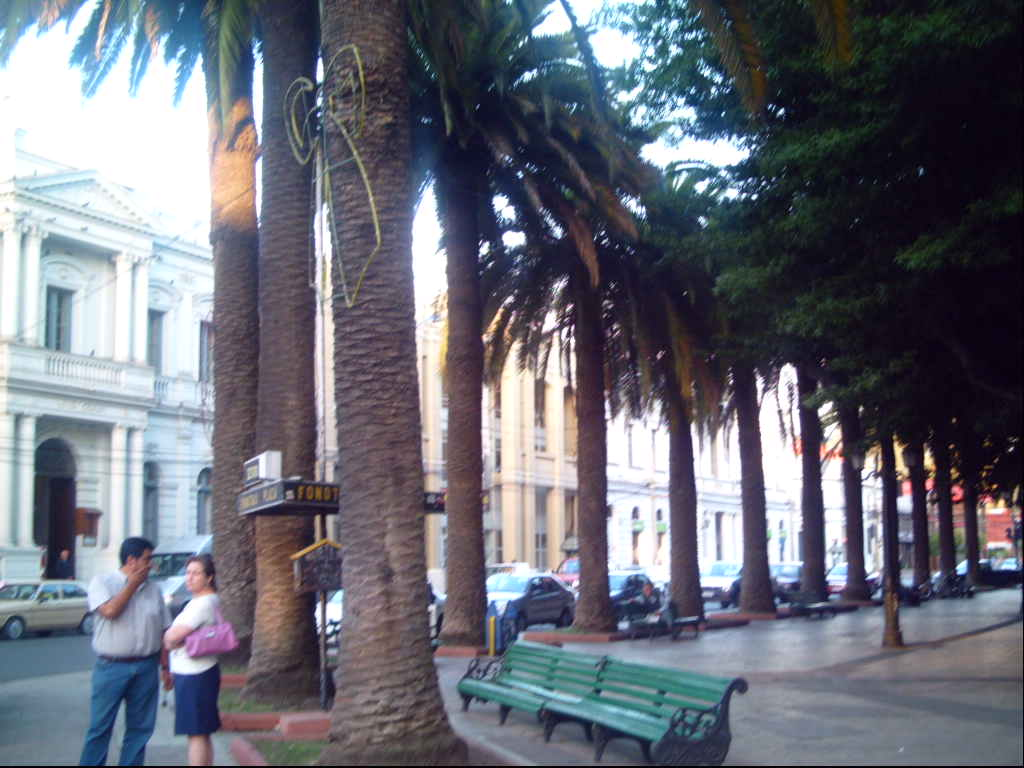
Plaza de Armas.

The Plaza de Armas, designated a "Typical Zone," is a major attraction adorned with sixty phoenix palm trees from the Canary Islands. It features sculptures, water fountains, and an Eiffel-style iron kiosk declared a National Monument. The square includes bronze busts of the city's founder, José Antonio Manso de Velasco, and a monument to the toqui Lautaro, carved by sculptor Heraclio Calquín.

The city's traditional cakes, known as "tortas curicanas," are popular among locals and tourists alike. Tortas Montero gained international recognition in 1995 by entering the Guinness World Records for creating the world's largest cake.

Cerro Condell, a prominent hill in the city center, is a popular spot during national holidays, offering panoramic views, recreational areas, and the Immaculate Conception monument. The Alameda Antonio Manso de Velasco avenue, adorned with gardens and trees, intersects the city, leading to the San Francisco church. Additionally, Potrero Grande, located around 30 km from Curicó, attracts nature enthusiasts with its mountainous terrain, forests, and waterfalls, ideal for hiking.

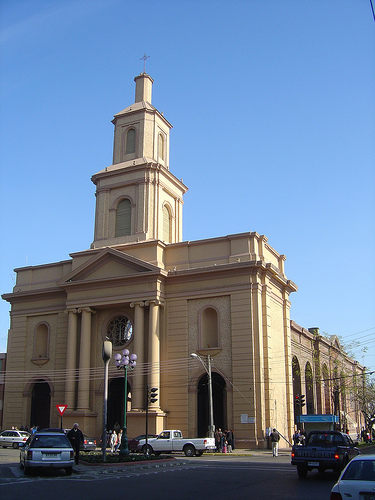
The main parish church around main square.

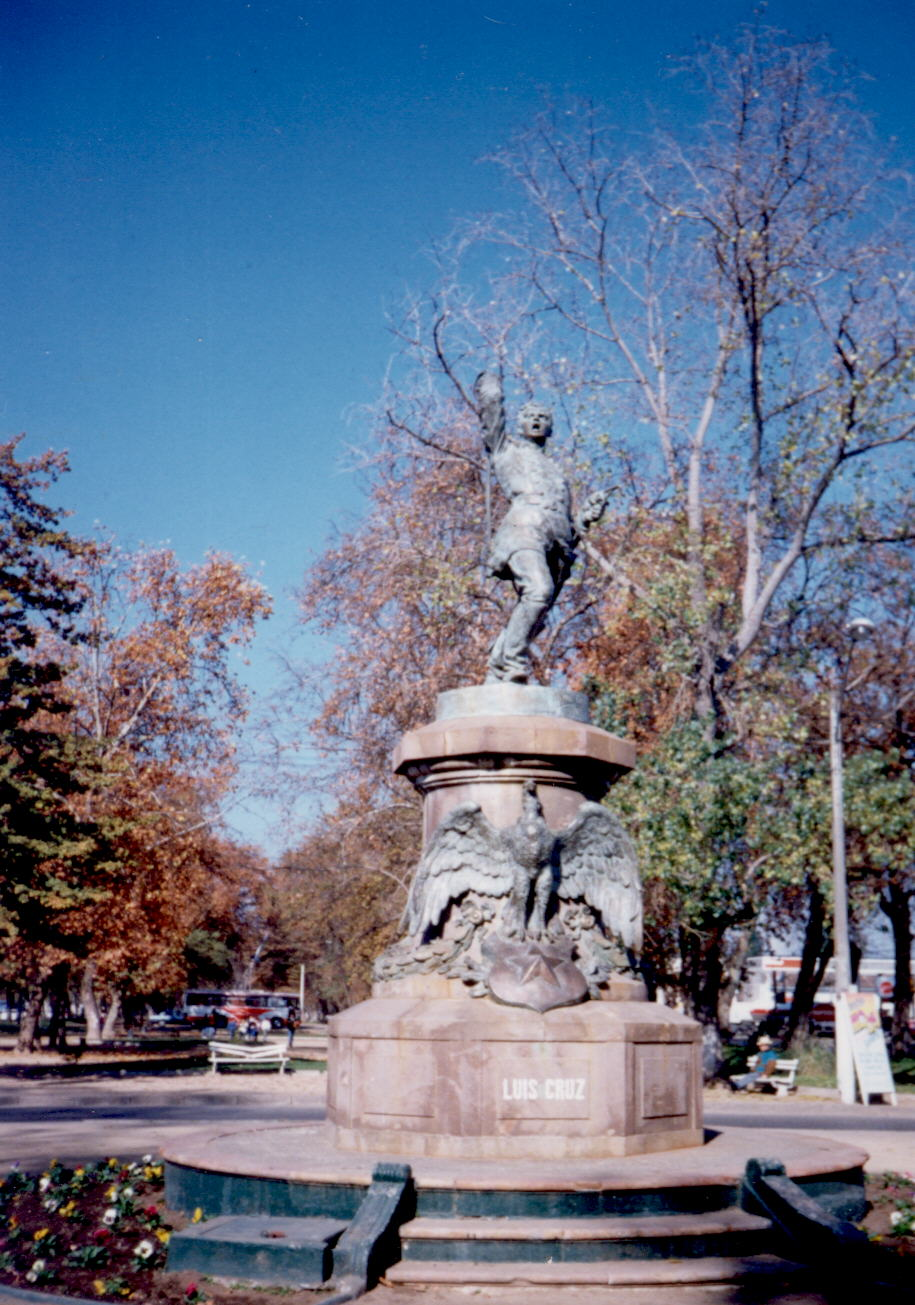
Luis Cruz Martínez, hero from Curicó.

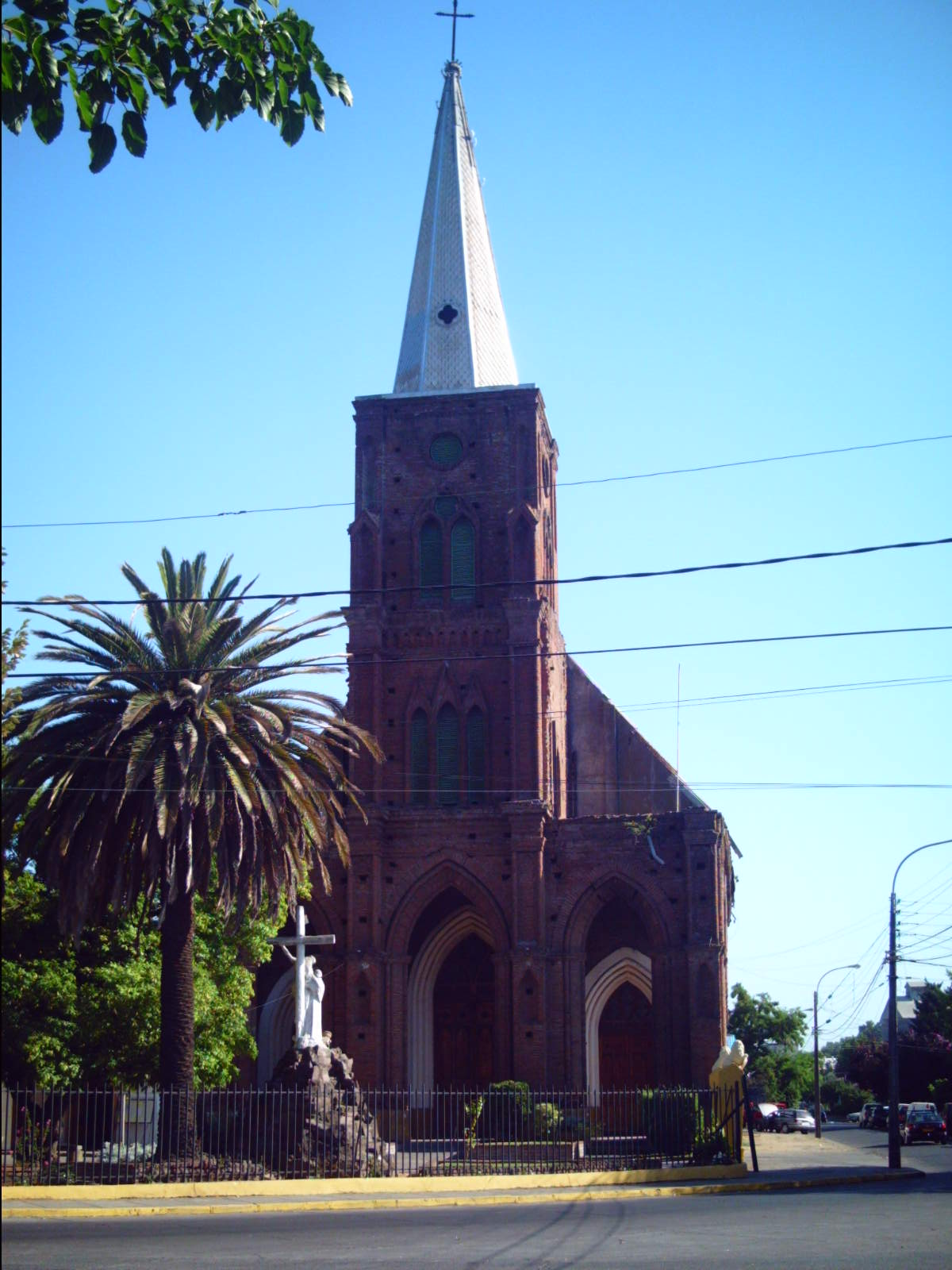
San Francisco Church, before being destroyed in the 2010 earthquake

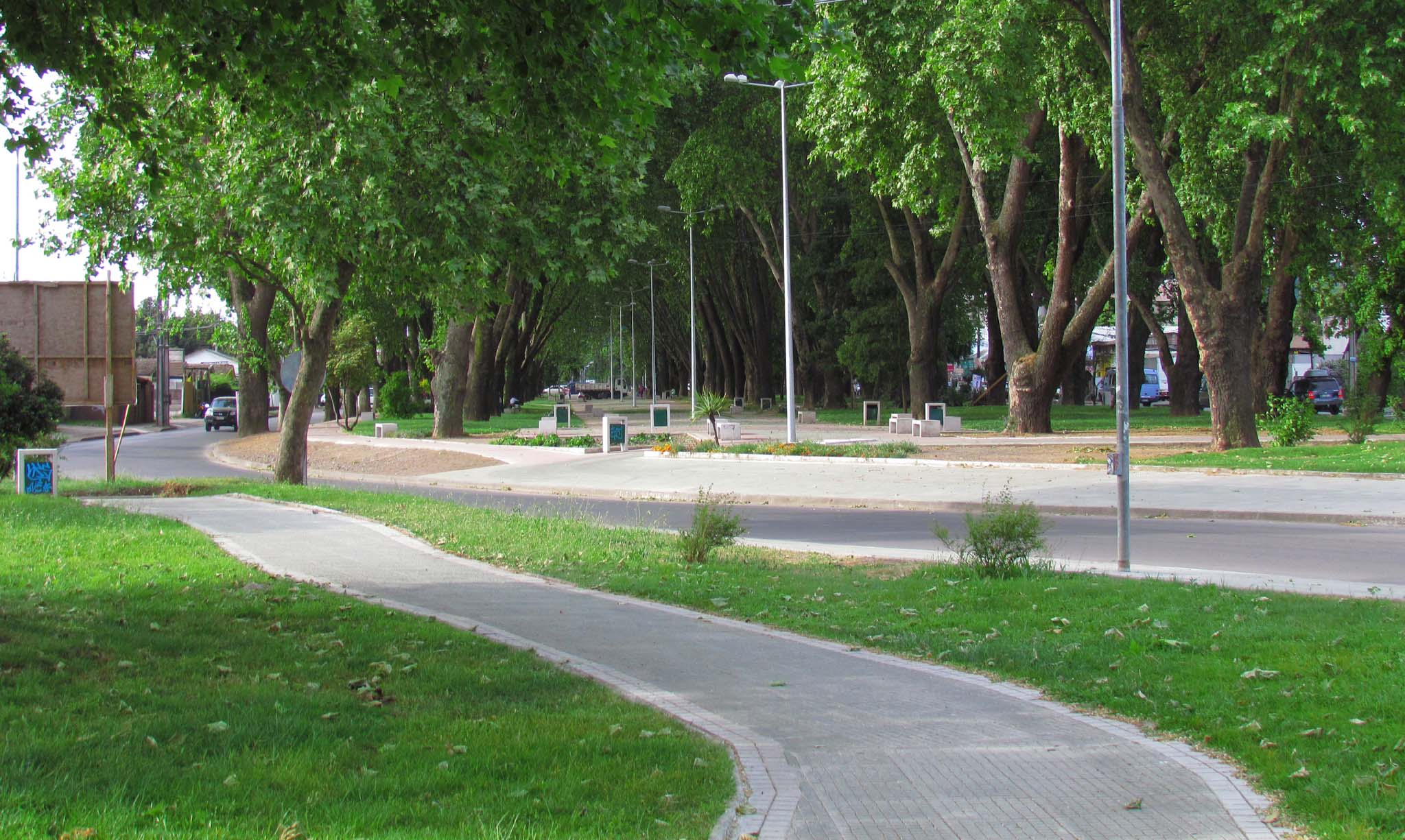
Curicó, Alameda, 2012

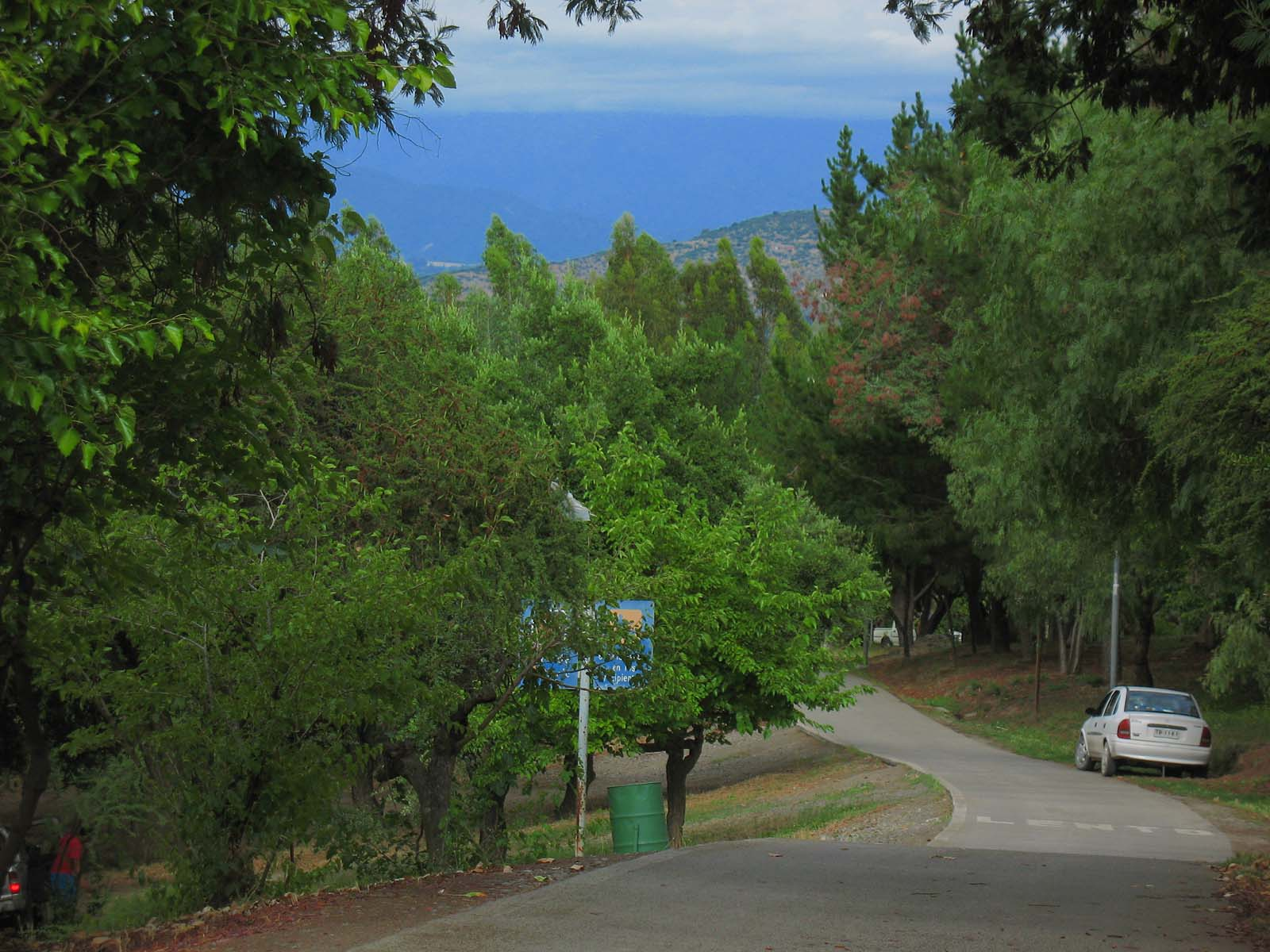
Cerro Condell, Curicó

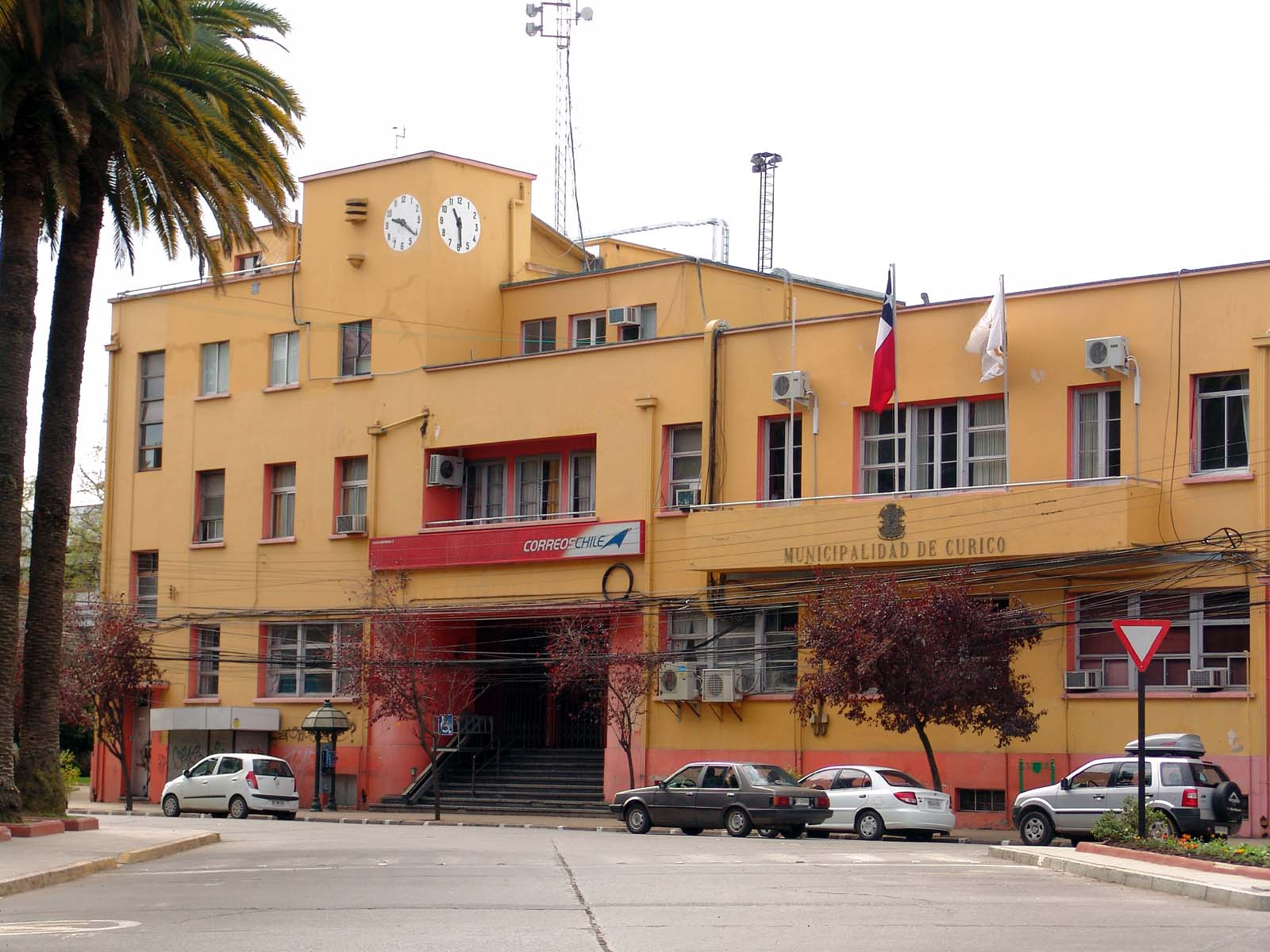
Correos de Chile (Post office) and Curicó's Municipalidad (City hall)

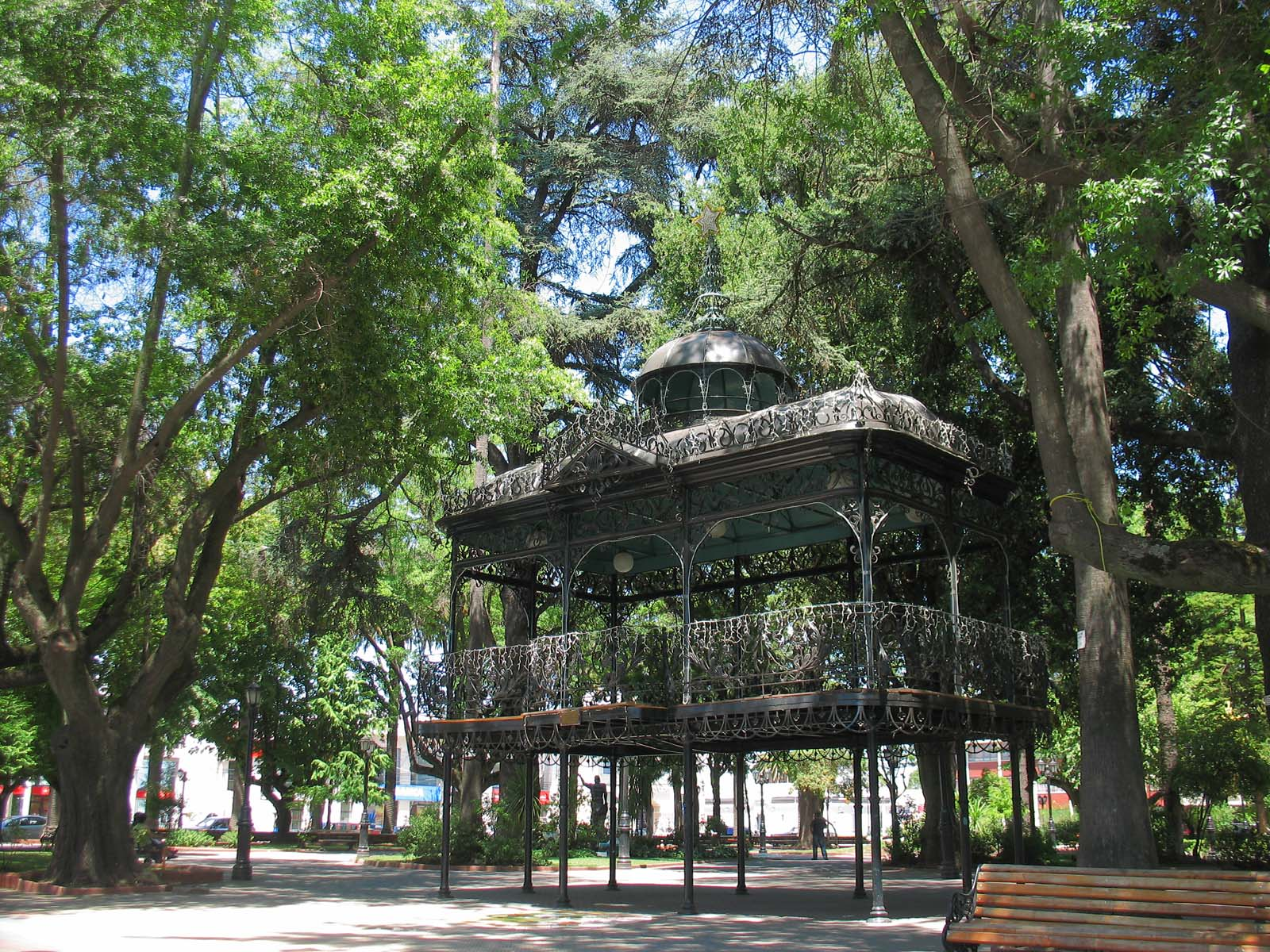
Kiosk in Curicó's Plaza de Armas

== Education ==
The city has two universities:

- Universidad de Talca (Traditional-Public),
- Universidad Católica del Maule (Traditional-Religious),

Higher-education institutions:

- Instituto Profesional DuocUC of the Pontificia Universidad Católica de Chile
- Instituto Profesional AIEP of the Universidad Andrés Bello

== Media ==
The city has one of the oldest newspapers in Chile, La Prensa de Curicó (Press of Curico), founded in 1898. Before the earthquake of 2010, its offices were located in front of the central square, but have been relocated since because the building collapsed.

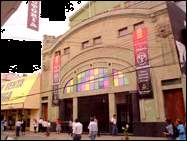
Victoria Theatre

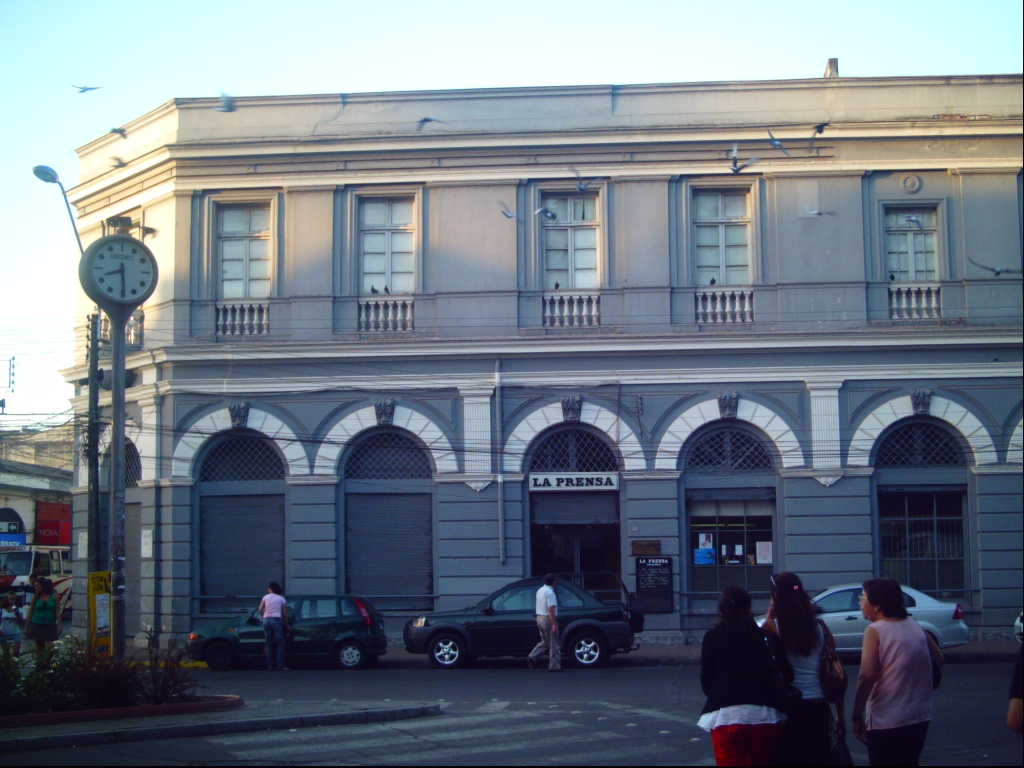
Diario La Prensa

== Notable people ==
- Jorge Eduardo Álvarez (born 1990), Chilean footballer
- Jorge Castro de la Barra (born 1953), Chilean radio and television personality and fraudster

== Sports ==
Curicó is known for its bicycle culture. Many Chilean cyclists of international level started riding in the city, such as Marco Arriagada, Marcelo Arriagada and Luis Fernando Sepúlveda.

The local football team is Club Provincial Curicó Unido.

== Administration ==
As a commune, Curicó is a third-level administrative division of Chile administered by a municipal council, headed by an alcalde who is directly elected every four years. Currently, the 2024-2028 alcalde is George Bordachar Sotomayor.

Within the electoral divisions of Chile, Curicó is represented in the Chamber of Deputies by Roberto León (PDC) and Celso Morales (UDI) as part of the 36th electoral district, together with Teno, Romeral, Molina, Sagrada Familia, Hualañé, Licantén, Vichuquén and Rauco. The commune is represented in the Senate by Juan Antonio Coloma Correa (UDI) and Andrés Zaldívar Larraín (PDC) as part of the 10th senatorial constituency (Maule-North).

== See also ==
- (in German) Census of Population in Chile

== Sources ==
- (in Spanish) History of Curicó by Tomás Guevara
- Information about cultural life and tourism.
- Report about urbanization in Latin American cities.
