= Deaths in September 2008 =

The following is a list of notable deaths in September 2008.

Entries for each day are listed alphabetically by surname. A typical entry lists information in the following sequence:

- Name, age, country of citizenship at birth, subsequent country of citizenship (if applicable), reason for notability, cause of death (if known), and reference.

== September 2008 ==
=== 1 ===
- Thomas J. Bata, 93, Czech-born Canadian businessman (Bata Shoes).
- Inge Bausenwein, 87, German Olympic athlete.
- Calvin Beale, 85, American demographer, colon cancer.
- Ian Edward Fraser, 87, British recipient of the Victoria Cross.
- Helen Galland, 83, American retail executive, president of Bonwit Teller (1980–1983), heart attack.
- Kevin Heinze, 80, Australian pioneer gardening television presenter, heart attack.
- Mel Ignatow, 70, American murderer, fall.
- Carl Kaufmann, 72, German Olympic silver medallist (1960).
- Sheldon Keller, 85, American comedy writer, complications from Alzheimer's disease.
- Don LaFontaine, 68, American voice-over artist, complications from pneumothorax.
- Henry Wako Muloki, 87, Ugandan Kyabazinga of Busoga since 1995, esophageal cancer.
- Michael Pate, 88, Australian actor (Matlock Police, Hondo, The Court Jester) and writer, pneumonia.
- Jerry Reed, 71, American musician ("When You're Hot, You're Hot", "East Bound and Down") and actor (Smokey and the Bandit), complications from emphysema.
- Oded Schramm, 46, Israeli mathematician, fall.
- Gerry White, 64, British businessman, prostate cancer.

=== 2 ===
- Andreas Zeier Cappelen, 93, Norwegian politician and minister.
- Todd Cruz, 52, American Major League Baseball player.
- Arne Domnérus, 83, Swedish jazz alto saxophonist and clarinetist.
- Joey Giardello, 78, American boxer, middleweight boxing champion (1963–1965), heart failure.
- Abdullah al-Harari, 98, Ethiopian-born Lebanese scholar, founder of the Al-Ahbash movement, natural causes.
- Bill Melendez, 91, Mexican-born American animator (Peanuts).
- Dame Alison Munro, 94, British civil servant and headmistress.
- Julia Pirie, 90, British MI5 spy.
- Sir Denis Rooke, 84, British industrialist.

=== 3 ===
- Charles-Robert Ageron, 84, French historian.
- Abdulla Alishayev, Russian Dagestani journalist, shot.
- Lalla Bahia, Moroccan royalty, third wife of Mohammed V.
- Donald Blakeslee, 89, American Air Force officer.
- Paul DiLascia, 49, American software developer.
- Françoise Demulder, 61, French war photographer, heart attack.
- Mark Guardado, 46, American mobster, President of Hells Angels San Francisco chapter, shot.
- Michael Hammer, 60, American management theorist, cranial bleeding.
- Earl Lunsford, 74, American Canadian Football League player (Calgary Stampeders, Winnipeg Blue Bombers), Hall of Famer.
- Ron Rivera, 60, American public health innovator, malaria.
- Joan Segarra, 80, Spanish football player (FC Barcelona and manager.
- May Shin, 91, Burmese actress and singer, pulmonary edema.
- Pierre Van Dormael, 56, Belgian guitarist, cancer.
- René Vingerhoet, 96, Belgian Olympic rower.
- Géo Voumard, 87, Swiss composer and producer, founder of the Montreux Jazz Festival.
- Jerry Zawadzkas, 62, American football player.

=== 4 ===
- Fernest Arceneaux, 68, American Creole Zydeco accordionist and singer.
- Mary Dunn, 66, American Iyengar Yoga instructor, peritoneal cancer.
- Colin Egar, 81, Australian test cricket umpire.
- Dick Enderle, 60, American football player.
- Fon Huffman, 95, American World War II veteran, last survivor of the Panay incident.
- Abdul Samad Ismail, 84, Malaysian journalist, lung infection and kidney failure.
- Alain Jacquet, 69, French pop artist, cancer.
- Jenny, 55, American western lowland gorilla, oldest gorilla in captivity (Dallas Zoo), euthanized.
- Tommy Johnston, 81, British footballer, top scorer for Leyton Orient.
- Francesca Lancellotti, 91, Italian farmer declared venerable.
- Erik Nielsen, 84, Canadian deputy prime minister (1984–1986), brother of Leslie Nielsen, heart attack.
- Eduard Paukson, 72, Estonian astrologer.
- Waldick Soriano, 75, Brazilian composer and singer, prostate cancer.
- Fernando Torres, 80, Brazilian actor, voice-over artist, director and producer, husband of Fernanda Montenegro, emphysema.
- Alina Vedmid, 68, Ukrainian politician.
- Jerome Weber, 92, Canadian abbot of St. Peter-Muenster of Saskatchewan.

=== 5 ===
- Kay Amert, 60, French scholar, cancer.
- Raymond Bernabei, 83, American soccer player, complications of non-Hodgkin lymphoma.
- Robert Giroux, 94, American editor and publisher (Farrar, Straus and Giroux).
- Miroslav Havel, 86, Czech-born Irish chief designer (Waterford Crystal).
- Thubten Jigme Norbu, 86, Tibetan lama (Taktser Rinpoche), eldest brother of the 14th Dalai Lama.
- Lucian Pye, 86, American political scientist and sinologist, expert on Chinese politics, pneumonia.
- Luis Santibáñez, 72, Chilean football team manager, complications from a kidney condition.
- Mila Schön, 91, Italian fashion designer.

=== 6 ===
- Abd Al-Halim Abu-Ghazala, 78, Egyptian politician, field marshal and defence minister, throat cancer.
- Aril Edvardsen, 69, Norwegian evangelical preacher and missionary.
- Antonio Innocenti, 93, Italian cardinal.
- Nicole Lai, 34, Singaporean singer, skin cancer.
- Allan Lawrence, 82, Canadian politician, MP for Northumberland—Durham (1972–1988).
- Ray Loring, 65, American professor and composer, heart attack.
- Sören Nordin, 91, Swedish harness racing trainer.
- Anita Page, 98, American actress (The Broadway Melody), natural causes.
- Larry Shaben, 73, Canadian politician, member of Legislative Assembly of Alberta (1975–1989), cancer.
- Bill Shorthouse, 86, British footballer.
- Mike Swoboda, 69, American politician, mayor of Kirkwood, Missouri (2000–2008), complications from gunshot wounds.
- Sally Willington, 77, English activist.

=== 7 ===
- Kune Biezeveld, 60, Dutch theologian.
- Ilarion Ciobanu, 76, Romanian actor.
- Dino Dvornik, 44, Croatian actor and pop singer.
- David Fitzsimons, 58, Australian Olympic athlete.
- Peter Glossop, 80, British operatic baritone.
- Don Gutteridge, 96, American Major League Baseball player, coach and manager.
- Don Haskins, 78, American college basketball coach, heart failure.
- Gregory Mcdonald, 71, American author (Fletch), cancer.
- Nagi Noda, 35, Japanese pop artist and director, complications from a traffic collision.
- Gordon Stromberg, 80, Canadian politician, member of Legislative Assembly of Alberta (1971–1986).
- Richard "Popcorn" Wylie, 69, American musician.

=== 8 ===
- Ahn Jae-hwan, 36, South Korean actor, suicide by carbon monoxide poisoning. (body discovered on this date)
- Nathan Green Gordon, 92, American politician and Medal of Honor recipient, Lt. Governor of Arkansas (1947–1967), pneumonia.
- Celia Gregory, 58, British actress.
- Ron Guthrey, 92, New Zealand politician, Mayor of Christchurch (1968–1971).
- Ralph Plaisted, 80, American Arctic explorer, natural causes.
- Evan Tanner, 37, American mixed martial arts fighter and UFC middleweight champion, hyperthermia. (body discovered on this date)
- Kunnakudi Vaidyanathan, 73, Indian violinist, after long illness.
- George Zarnecki, 92, Polish art historian and medievalist.
- Hector Zazou, 60, French composer and record producer.

=== 9 ===
- Tina Allen, 58, American sculptor, pneumonia.
- Betty Constable, 83, American squash player.
- Eddie Crowder, 77, American football player and coach, complications of leukemia.
- A. U. Fuimaono, 85, American Samoan politician, first Delegate to the United States House of Representatives (1970–1974).
- Nina Lawson, 82, British wigmaker for the Metropolitan Opera, pernicious anaemia.
- Jacob Lekgetho, 34, South African footballer.
- P. N. Menon, 80, Indian film director, after long illness.
- Warith Deen Mohammed, 74, American Islamic leader, son of Elijah Muhammad.
- Richard Monette, 64, Canadian actor and director, pulmonary embolism.
- Bheki Mseleku, 53, South African-born British jazz musician, diabetes.
- Nouhak Phoumsavanh, 98, Laotian politician, president (1992–1998), natural causes.

=== 10 ===
- Saleh al Aridi, 50, Lebanese pro-Syrian politician, car bomb.
- Gérald Beaudoin, 79, Canadian lawyer and senator (1988–2004).
- José Antonio Dammert Bellido, 91, Peruvian bishop.
- Cameron Buchanan, 80, British footballer.
- David Chipp, 81, British editor-in-chief (Press Association, Reuters), first resident correspondent for Reuters in China.
- Patrick Flynn, 72, American composer and conductor, pulmonary embolism.
- Robert Glasgow, 83, American organist and University of Michigan professor emeritus.
- Florian Goebel, 35, German astrophysicist, fall.
- Vernon Handley, 77, British conductor.
- J. J. Harrington, 89, American politician.
- Sherrill Headrick, 71, American football player, cancer.
- Fitzroy Hoyte, 68, Trinidad Olympic cyclist, traffic collision.
- Domagoj Kapec, 18, Croatian ice hockey player, car accident.
- Frank Mundus, 82, American shark fisherman, alleged inspiration for Quint in Jaws, heart attack.
- Gary O'Donnell, 40, British soldier, improvised explosive device.
- Yuri Osipyan, 77, Russian physicist.
- Reginald Shepherd, 45, American poet, cancer.
- Paul Williams, 85, British politician, MP (1953–1964).

=== 11 ===
- Bennett Campbell, 65, Canadian politician, premier of Prince Edward Island (1978–1979), cancer.
- Sue Garden-Bachop, 46, New Zealand rugby union player (national team), leukaemia.
- Dave Hanner, 78, American football player and coach (Green Bay Packers), heart attack.
- Klaus Johann Jacobs, 71, German-born Swiss billionaire, cancer.
- Fran Reed, 65, American teacher and fish skin artist, cancer.
- Nils Johan Ringdal, 56, Norwegian author and historian.
- Martin Tytell, 94, American manual typewriter expert, cancer.
- Joan Winston, 77, American author, founder of Star Trek convention, Alzheimer's disease.
- Lai Ying Xin, 16, Malaysian schoolgirl, strangulation.

=== 12 ===
- Camila Ashland, 97, American actress (Dark Shadows, 10).
- George Brown, 85, American football player.
- Simon Hantaï, 85, Hungarian-born French abstract artist.
- Tomislav Ladan, 76, Croatian encyclopedist and polymath, malignant tumor.
- Max Mermelstein, 65, American drug trafficker, cancer.
- George Putnam, 94, American television news reporter, heart failure.
- Bob Quinn, 93, Australian footballer (Port Adelaide) and Military Medal recipient.
- Marjorie Thomas, 85, British opera singer, after long illness.
- Paola S. Timiras, 85, American doctor, expert on the physiology of ageing, heart failure.
- Ferenc Velkey, 92, Hungarian Olympic handball player.
- Charlie Walker, 81, American country music singer, colon cancer.
- David Foster Wallace, 46, American author and essayist (Infinite Jest), suicide by hanging.

=== 13 ===
- Peter Camejo, 68, American politician and activist, lymphoma.
- Dean Hoge, 71, American sociologist, specialist in American Catholicism, cancer.
- Duncan Laing, 75, New Zealand swimming coach, cancer.
- James Snow, 79, Canadian politician, member of Legislative Assembly of Ontario (1967–1985), diabetes.
- Olin Stephens, 100, American yacht designer.
- John Usher, 62, British academic lawyer, leukaemia.
- Alice Van-Springsteen, 90, American stuntwoman, pneumonia.
- Abdullah Wardak, Afghan governor of Logar Province, suicide attack.

=== 14 ===
- John Burnside, 91, American inventor, brain cancer.
- Hyman Golden, 85, American co-founder of Snapple Beverage Corporation, complications from stroke.
- Ștefan Iordache, 67, Romanian actor, leukemia.
- Georgi Kitov, 65, Bulgarian archaeologist, heart attack.
- Lynn Kohlman, 62, American model and photographer, breast and brain cancer.
- Lobsang Nyima Pal Sangpo, 79, Tibetan 100th Ganden Tripa (1994–2002), head of the Gelug school of Tibetan Buddhism.
- Mu Tiezhu, 59, Chinese basketball player, heart attack.
- Ralph Russell, 90, British Urdu scholar.
- Gennady Troshev, 61, Russian politician and military commander (Second Chechen War), plane crash.

=== 15 ===
- Marion Dewar, 80, Canadian politician, mayor of Ottawa (1978–1985), fall.
- Barthélémy Djabla, 72, Ivorian archbishop of Gagnoa.
- Gangadhar Gopal Gadgil, 85, Indian writer, cancer.
- Jean-Jacques Guissart, 81, French Olympic silver medal-winning (1952) rower.
- Charlotte Kohler, 99, American editor, heart failure.
- Danny Lawson, 60, Canadian ice hockey player (Minnesota North Stars, Buffalo Sabres, Detroit Red Wings).
- John Matshikiza, 53, South African actor, writer and poet, heart attack.
- Juraj Njavro, 70, Croatian doctor and politician, after long illness.
- J. Patrick Rooney, 80, American insurance advocate.
- Stefano Rosso, 59, Italian singer-songwriter and guitarist.
- Richard Wright, 65, British Hall of Fame keyboardist (Pink Floyd) and songwriter ("The Dark Side of the Moon"), cancer.

=== 16 ===
- Verlie Abrams, 87, American football player.
- Jack Alderman, 57, American murderer, execution by lethal injection.
- Avraham Biran, 98, Israeli archaeologist, natural causes.
- Elizabeth Douglas-Hamilton, Duchess of Hamilton, 92, British peeress.
- John Fancy, 95, British World War II RAF airman.
- David Laycock, 61, English cricketer
- Andrei Volkonsky, 75, Russian composer.
- Charles Whitebread, 65, American professor of law, cancer.
- Norman Whitfield, 68, American Motown songwriter ("I Heard It Through the Grapevine") and record producer, diabetes.

=== 17 ===
- Princess Luluwah bint Abdulaziz Al Saud, 80, Saudi member of the royal family, sister of King Abdullah.
- James Crumley, 68, American crime writer, complications from kidney and pulmonary diseases.
- Didier Dagueneau, 52, French winemaker, plane crash.
- José María Cirarda Lachiondo, 91, Spanish bishop of the Archdiocese of Pamplona y Tudela (1978–1993).
- Anna Langford, 90, American politician, first African American woman to serve on the Chicago City Council, lung cancer.
- Michael Omondi, 46, Kenyan field hockey player, after short illness.
- Humberto Solás, 66, Cuban filmmaker, cancer.
- Robert Steinberg, 61, American physician, co-founder of Scharffen Berger Chocolate Maker, lymphoma.

=== 18 ===
- Ekaterina Andreeva, 66, Uzbek arachnologist.
- Mauricio Kagel, 76, Argentine-born German composer.
- Peter Kastner, 64, Canadian actor, heart attack.
- Ron Lancaster, 69, American Canadian Football League quarterback and coach, heart attack.
- Howard Mann, 85, American actor and comedian, cancer.
- Sherman Parker, 37, American politician, member of Missouri House of Representatives (2003–2006), brain aneurysm.
- Fabiola Salazar, 42, Peruvian congresswoman since 2006, car accident.
- Henry Z. Steinway, 93, American businessman (Steinway & Sons).
- Don Ultang, 91, American Pulitzer Prize–winning photographer.
- Florestano Vancini, 82, Italian film director and screenwriter, after long illness.
- John Webb, 82, American judge of the Supreme Court of North Carolina (1986–1998), Parkinson's disease.

=== 19 ===
- Ernie Andres, 90, American college baseball coach and Major League Baseball player (Boston Red Sox).
- Marcel Dierkens, 83, Luxembourgish cyclist.
- Ned Harkness, 89, American ice hockey coach, stroke.
- Jun Ichikawa, 59, Japanese film director.
- David Jones, 74, British theatre and film director.
- Dave Needham, 57, British bantamweight boxing champion (1974–1975).
- Earl Palmer, 83, American rhythm and blues drummer, after long illness.
- Robert Royston, 90, American landscape architect.
- Dick Sudhalter, 69, American jazz trumpeter, pneumonia.

=== 20 ===
- Nappy Brown, 78, American blues singer.
- Francis A. Dennis, Liberian diplomat.
- William Fox, 97, British actor.
- Duncan Glen, 75, British poet, literary critic and designer, professor emeritus of visual communication (Nottingham Trent).
- Steve Gray, 64, British musician.
- Ken Harris, 45, American member of Baltimore City Council (1999–2007), shot.
- Arne Haugestad, 73, Norwegian Supreme Court lawyer, Arne Treholt's defender.
- Johnny H. Hayes, 67, American fundraiser for Al Gore's presidential campaigns, stomach cancer.
- Willi Heidel, 92, Romanian Olympic field handball player.
- Paul Howell, 57, British member of the European Parliament (1979–1994), plane crash.
- George Larson, 96, Canadian Olympic swimmer.
- Ed Sutton, 73, American football player, complications following heart bypass surgery.
- John Taylor, 87, American military archivist at National Archives and Records Administration, heart failure.
- Frank Valenti, 97, American mob boss (Rochester crime family).
- Ivo Žďárek, 47, Czech ambassador to Vietnam (2004–2008) and Pakistan (2008), suicide bombing.

=== 21 ===
- Mary Garber, 92, American sportswriter.
- Carlos González Cruchaga, 87, Chilean bishop of the Diocese of Talca (1967–1996).
- Nancy Hicks Maynard, 66, American journalist, advocate for diversity in journalism, organ failure.
- Sir Brian Pippard, 88, British physicist, Cavendish Professor of Physics (1971–1984).
- Barefoot Sanders, 83, American federal judge, natural causes.
- Paul Tansey, 59, Irish economics editor (The Irish Times).
- Brian Thomsen, 49, American author and editor, heart attack.
- D. B. Wijetunga, 92, Sri Lankan prime minister (1989–1993), president (1993–1994), after long illness.

=== 22 ===
- Michael Andreevich, 88, Russian prince.
- Plato Andros, 86, American National Football League player (Chicago Cardinals), Alzheimer's disease.
- Olli Auero, 82, Finnish diplomat.
- H. Dale Cook, 84, American federal judge since 1974, cancer.
- Thomas Dörflein, 44, German zookeeper, surrogate parent of the polar bear Knut, heart attack.
- Connie Haines, 87, American singer, myasthenia gravis.
- Buddy McDonald, 85, American child actor (Our Gang), heart failure.
- Petrus Schaesberg, 41, German art historian, suicide by jumping.

=== 23 ===
- Mona Abul-Fadl, 62–63, Egyptian orientalist, breast cancer.
- José Martins Achiam, 64, Portuguese karate coach, stroke.
- Esther Figueiredo Ferraz, 92, Brazilian Minister of Education (1982–1985) and first female minister, stroke.
- Richard Henyard, 34, American murderer, execution by lethal injection.
- Wally Hilgenberg, 66, American National Football League player (Minnesota Vikings), amyotrophic lateral sclerosis.
- Rudolf Illovszky, 86, Hungarian footballer and manager, pneumonia.
- Peter Leonard, 66, Australian broadcaster, mesothelioma.
- Pedro Masó, 81, Spanish film director and producer, natural causes.
- Brock McElheran, 90, Canadian conductor and composer.
- Loren Pope, 98, American education consultant, heart failure.
- Sonja Savić, 47, Serbian actress, heroin overdose.
- Ellen Tarry, 101, American children's author.
- William Woodruff, 92, British historian and author.

=== 24 ===
- Bengt Anderberg, 88, Swedish poet, novelist, editor and playwright.
- Kwadwo Baah-Wiredu, 56, Ghanaian finance minister since 2005, after short illness.
- Oliver Crawford, 91, American television writer blacklisted by the House Un-American Activities Committee.
- Irene Dailey, 88, American actress (Five Easy Pieces, The Amityville Horror, Another World), colon cancer.
- Sir Peter Derham, 83, Australian businessman and philanthropist, stroke.
- Uno Laht, 84, Estonian writer.
- Dick Lynch, 72, American football player and radio announcer (New York Giants), leukemia.
- Maurits van Nierop, 25, Dutch international cricketer, fall.
- Thiago da Silva, 24, Brazilian footballer, shot.
- Cherry Smith, 65, Jamaican singer (The Wailers), heart attack.
- Mickey Vernon, 90, American baseball player, stroke.
- Vice Vukov, 72, Croatian singer and politician.
- Claude Wilton, 89, Irish politician and solicitor.
- Ruslan Yamadayev, 46, Chechen warlord and member of Russian State Duma, shot.

=== 25 ===
- Glenn Andrews, 99, American politician, Representative (1965–1967), oldest surviving member of the House of Representatives.
- Brian Donnelly, 59, New Zealand diplomat and politician, MP (1996–2008).
- Edward Klima, 77, American linguist, complications from brain surgery.
- Guillermo López Langarica, 40, Mexican YouTube celebrity, car accident.
- Horațiu Rădulescu, 66, Romanian composer, spectral music pioneer.
- Ralph Sazio, 86, Canadian football coach (Hamilton Tiger-Cats).
- Jimmy Sirrel, 86, British football manager (Notts County), after long illness.
- Roger Vanderfield, 80, Australian rugby union referee, IRB chairman and ARU president.

=== 26 ===
- Bernadette Greevy, 68, Irish mezzo-soprano, after short illness.
- Joli Jászai, 101, Hungarian actress.
- Géza Kalocsay, 95, Hungarian football player and manager.
- Aggie Kukulowicz, 75, Canadian ice hockey player (New York Rangers), heart failure.
- Phyllis Welch MacDonald, 95, American theater and film actress.
- Raymond Macherot, 84, Belgian cartoonist.
- Stanisław Marucha, 71, Polish Olympic shooter.
- Jan Mazur, 88, Polish bishop of Siedlce.
- Marian McQuade, 91, American founder of National Grandparents Day, heart failure.
- Ernie Meissner, 71, Canadian Olympic diver.
- Marc Moulin, 66, Belgian jazz musician and journalist, throat cancer.
- Paul Newman, 83, American actor (The Sting, Cool Hand Luke, The Color of Money) and entrepreneur, Oscar winner (1987), lung cancer.
- Cirio H. Santiago, 72, Filipino filmmaker and producer, complications from lung cancer.
- Yonty Solomon, 71, South African pianist, brain tumour.

=== 27 ===
- Len Browning, 80, British footballer.
- John Houston, 78, British painter.
- Mahendra Kapoor, 74, Indian playback singer, heart attack.
- Mario Maya, 71, Spanish dancer and choreographer, cancer.
- Jimmy Murray, 72, British footballer, prostate cancer.
- Henri Pachard, 69, American pornographic film director, throat cancer.
- Olaf Poulsen, 88, Norwegian president of the International Skating Union (1980–1994).
- Gerald Small, 52, American football player (Miami Dolphins).

=== 28 ===
- Georges Adda, 92, Tunisian politician, heart attack.
- Andrzej Badeński, 65, Polish Olympic bronze medal-winning (1964) athlete.
- Osborn Elliott, 83, American editor of Newsweek (1961–1976), complications from cancer.
- Jack Faulkner, 82, American football coach and administrator.
- Margot Gayle, 100, American historic preservationist and author.
- Malalai Kakar, 41, Afghan senior policewoman, shot.
- Konstantin Pavlov, 75, Bulgarian poet and screenwriter, after long illness.
- Athos Tanzini, 95, Italian Olympic fencer.
- Thomas Thewes, 76, American businessman, co-owner of the Carolina Hurricanes, leukemia.

=== 29 ===
- Youssef Sabri Abu Taleb, 79, Egyptian general.
- Hayden Carruth, 87, American poet and literary critic, stroke.
- Richard Clayton, 93, American actor and talent agent (Burt Reynolds, James Dean), heart failure.
- Miguel Córcega, 79, Mexican actor and director.
- Milt Davis, 79, American football player (Baltimore Colts), cancer.
- Tim Fortescue, 92, British politician, MP (1966–1974).
- Elinor Guggenheimer, 96, American philanthropist and author.
- Louis Guss, 90, American actor (Moonstruck, Highlander, The Godfather).
- Stan Kann, 83, American organist and Tonight Show regular, complications from heart procedure.
- Sultan Salahuddin Owaisi, 72, Indian politician.
- Antônio Sarto, 82, Brazilian bishop of Barra do Garças.
- Glen Sheil, 78, Australian medical practitioner and politician, Senator (1974–1981, 1984–1990).
- Anthony Spero, 79, American financier, leader of Bonanno crime family, after short illness.
- Relus ter Beek, 64, Dutch politician, Minister of Defence (1989–1994), abolished conscription, lung cancer.
- Jock Wilson, 105, British soldier, UK's oldest D-Day veteran.

=== 30 ===
- Henry Adler, 93, American drummer, teacher of Buddy Rich.
- Ed Brinkman, 66, American baseball player and coach, lung cancer.
- Sam Calder, 92, Australian politician and World War II fighter pilot, MP (1966–1980).
- J. L. Chestnut Jr., 77, American civil rights lawyer, kidney failure.
- Richard Haine, 91, British Royal Air Force officer.
- J. B. Jeyaretnam, 82, Singaporean politician, MP (1981–1986), NCMP (1997–2001), heart failure.
