= Guardado =

Guardado is a Portuguese and Spanish surname, which derives from guardar, meaning "to guard".Notable people with the surname include:

- Albert Guardado (born 1973), American boxer
- Andrés Guardado (born 1986), Mexican football player
- Eddie Guardado (born 1970), American baseball player
- Emilio Guardado, Salvadoran football coach
- Mark Guardado (1961–2008), American mobster
- Oscar Whalley Guardado

== See also ==
- Cuadrado
