= John Usher =

John Usher may refer to:

- John Palmer Usher (1816–1889), American administrator
- John Usher (academic) (1945–2008), British legal writer and academic
- John Usher (colonist) (1642–1722), colonial administrator; lieutenant governor of New Hampshire
- John Usher (cricketer) (1859–1905), English cricketer

== See also ==
- John Ussher (disambiguation)
- Usher (disambiguation)
