= Frances Reid (disambiguation) =

Frances Reid (1914–2010) was an American actress.

Frances Reid or Reed may also refer to:

- Frances Reid (director), American documentary filmmaker and cinematographer
- Fran Reed (1943–2008), American fiber artist and teacher

== See also ==
- Frances Reed Elliot (1892–1965), first African American women accepted into the American Red Cross Nursing Service
- Francis Reid (1900–1970), male British Army officer
