= Thiago Silva (disambiguation) =

Thiago Silva (born 1984) is a Brazilian footballer.

Thiago (da) Silva may also refer to:

- Thiago Silva (fighter) (born 1982), Brazilian kickboxer and mixed martial artist
- Thiago Silva (footballer, born 1983), Brazilian football player
- Thiago da Silva (footballer, born 1983) (1983–2008), Brazilian footballer
- Thiago Braz da Silva (born 1993), Brazilian pole vaulter
- Thiago Silva (weightlifter), Brazilian weightlifter
- "Thiago Silva" (song), 2016 song by Dave and AJ Tracey about the Brazilian footballer born in 1984

== See also ==
- Tiago Silva (disambiguation)
