= José Santana =

José Santana may refer to:

- José Santana (economist) (born 1962), Dominican economist
- José Santana (karateka) (born 1957)
- José Antonio Santana (born 1981), Spanish footballer
