= FUA =

FUA or Fua may refer to:

== People ==
- Alani Fua (born 1992), American football player
- Fua Haripitak (1910–1993), Thai artist
- Sione Fua (born 1988), American football player
- Fua (footballer) (born 1969), Angolan footballer

== Other uses ==
- Frente Única Antifascista, antifa organization of Brazil
- Al-Fu'ah, a town in Syria
- Argentine University Federation (Spanish: Federación Universitaria Argentina)
- Federal Union Army, a military coalition of insurgent groups in Myanmar (Burma)
- Force Unit Access (computing), an I/O write command option
- El Fua, an Internet meme
- Futura International Airways (ICAO code), a defunct Spanish airline
- Functional urban area, a measure of the population and expanse of metropolitan areas in countries
