= John Ussher =

John Ussher may refer to:

- John Ussher, publisher in 1571 of Aibidil Gaoidheilge agus Caiticiosma, the first book printed in Ireland in the Irish language
- John Ussher (died 1741) (c. 1682–1741), Irish MP for Carrick
- John Ussher (died 1749) (1703–1749), Irish MP for Dungarvan
- John Ussher (1730–1796), Irish MP for Innistiogue
- John Ussher (priest) (died 1835), Irish Anglican priest
- Johnny Ussher (1830–1879), Canadian gold commissioner

== See also ==
- John Usher (disambiguation)
- Ussher (surname)
