= Seigokan =

Karate organisation in Japan

Seigokan 正剛館
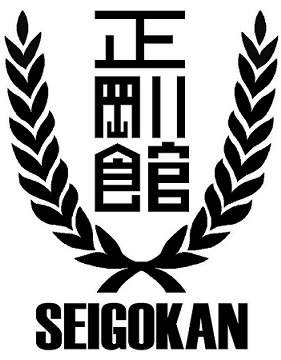
- Date founded: 1945
- Country of origin: Kyoto (Japan)
- Founder: Seigo Tada(多田正剛), (1922–1997)
- Current head: In alphabetical order: (1) Founder / Seigo Tada, Hanshi (10th Dan). (2) Seigo Tada II / Mrs.Okamoto Michiko, Soke. (3) Seigo Tada III / Akira Okamoto, Kancho. (4) Seigokan Overseas / Tsuji Masatomi (8th Dan), Head Director.
- Arts taught: Goju-Ryu • Karate-do
- Ancestor arts: Shaolin Nam Pai Chuan • Fujian White Crane
- Ancestor schools: Naha-te
- Descendant schools: Gojuryu Karatedo Kyokai (GKK)
- Practitioners: Atsuko Wakai • Cynthia Luster
- Official website: Nihon Seigokan

Seigokan (正剛館) is the Goju-Ryu Karate-do organization founded in 1945 by Seigo Tada (1922-1997) Hanshi (8th Dan). With its Hombu Dojo (headquarters) in Himeji, Japan, the Seigokan All Japan Karate-do Association (SAJKA) — its official name — has branches in Australia, Brazil, Canada, China (including Hong Kong and Macau), India, Italy, the Philippines, Portugal, Sri Lanka, the United States, England, Chile, Colombia, Indonesia and Venezuela.

Master Seigo Tada was a pupil of Chojun Miyagi and the head of the Karate Club at Ritsumeikan University. In the 1960s, Seigokan was considered the most important Goju-Ryu Association (Kai-Ha) in Japan, with more than 200,000 members.

Seigokan includes two unique kata created by Seigo Tada — Kihon-Tsuki-no kata and Kihon-Uke-no kata — in addition to the traditional Goju-ryu kata Sanchin, Tensho, Gekisai Dai Ichi, Gekisai Dai Ni, Saifa, Seienchin, Seipai, Shisochin, Sanseru, Seisan, Kururunfa and Suparinpei.

The Seigokan curriculum also includes Yakusoku Kumite (set sparring techniques) in the variants 1 to 7 of Zenkutsu and 1 to 7 of Shikodachi, as well as seven Torite (grappling and striking techniques). Today, SAJKA is directed by Sandaime Kancho — or Soke Seigo Tada III — who succeeded Mrs. Okamoto Michiko (Seigo Tada II), the widow of Seigo Tada Hanshi.

The most well-known Seigokan member is Ms. Atsuko Wakai, four-time WKF Women's Kata World Champion. Two senior members of Seigokan took important roles in continental and world karate affairs. The late Jose Martins Achiam 7th Dan (1944-2008) was an Executive Committee Member of World Karate Federation (WKF) and Secretary General of Asian Karatedo Federation (AKF). Bill K.S. Mok (7th Dan) was an Executive Committee Member of World Karate Federation 2004-2010 and Secretary General of Asian Karatedo Federation 2008-2010. The European Seigokan Chief Instructor is José Manuel Guerreiro Santana (7th Dan), twice World Seigokan Kumite Champion in 1998 and 2004, from Portugal Seigokan. The Italian Seigokan Chief Instructor is Shihan Francesco Cuzzocrea (6th Dan), from Reggio Calabria (Italy) The Indonesian Seigokan Chief Instructor is Shihan Dody Rochadi (6th Dan), from Jakarta (Indonesia).
