= Cuadrado =

Cuadrado is Spanish for "square". It may refer to:

- Carlos Cuadrado, Spanish professional tennis player
- Ibán Cuadrado, Spanish footballer
- Irene Cuadrado, Spanish painter
- José Fernando Cuadrado, Colombian football goalkeeper
- Juan Cuadrado, Colombian footballer
- Oliver Cuadrado, Spanish football goalkeeper
- Radha Cuadrado, Filipino singer and songwriter
- Verónica Cuadrado, Spanish handball player

== See also ==
- Quadrado (disambiguation)
