= José Martins Achiam =

Karate coach

José Martins Achiam 龚智仁
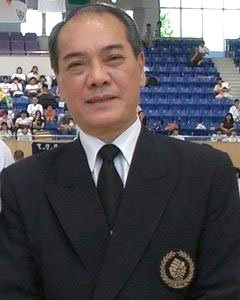
- Achiam at Himeji Budokan (2003)
- Born: April 18, 1944; Portuguese Macau
- Died: September 23, 2008 (aged 64); Macau
- Style: Gōjū-ryū
- Teachers: Seigo Tada, Yukiaki Yoki
- Rank: Sifu, Founder of Seigokan Macau. Shihan 7th Dan (SAJKA)

Other information
- Notable students: Pansy
- Website: www.aksm.weebly.com

José Martins Achiam (Simplified Chinese: 龚智仁, Macau, April 18, 1944 – Macau, September 23, 2008; 7th Dan), whose Chinese name was Gong Zhiren (Traditional Chinese: 龔智仁), was a renowned athlete[1] and sports administrator[1] from Macau of Portuguese nationality who introduced[1] Goju-Ryu Karate-Do Seigokan to Macau during the colonial era[1]. Founder[1] of the Macau Karate Association (AKM), of which he was president, and of the Macau Seigokan Karate-Do Association (AKSM)[1], he was a member of the Executive Committee of the World Karate Federation (WKF)[1] and Secretary-General of the Asian Karate Federation (AKF)[1].

He was born in Macau on April 18, 1944, into a Macanese family, the son of Joaquim Achiam[2], an inspector with the Macau Judicial Police, and Maria Celina Tang[2]. He attended St. Joseph’s Seminary[3] in Macau. He began training with a Japanese executive and Goju Ryu[4] instructor before 1965, the year Seigokan was officially introduced in Hong Kong.

Like Bill Mok and Dickie Chow, José Martins Achiam stood out as one of the pioneering students of Seigo Tada—founder of Seigokan and a disciple of Chojun Miyagi—and of Yukiaki Yoki[5] (Yukiaki Yang Ki), whom Seigo Tada appointed to introduce Seigokan in Hong Kong. José Martins Achiam began traveling weekly to Hong Kong[6] to refine his skills, and between 1966 and 1967, with Seigo Tada’s approval, he introduced[4] the Goju-Ryu Karate-Do Seigokan style in Macau.

Of his twenty-four enrolled students, only eighteen attended[7], and after three months, seven remained capable of keeping up with the demands of the rigorous training[7] led by José Martins Achiam, forming a core group[8] that would go on to spread Seigokan throughout Brazil, Australia, and the U.S.[7]. These were Luís Alberto Borges da Silva Pedruco, Alberto Carlos Paes D’Assumpção, Américo Machado de Mendonça, the brothers Jacinto Novo and Mário Novo, César Pereira, and Francisco Conceição[7].

In 1970, Luís Alberto Borges da Silva Pedruco and Alberto Carlos Paes D’Assumpção, known as Sensei Pedruco and Sensei Acaio, introduced Seigokan Goju-Ryu Karate-Do to Brazil,[9] founding the Seigokan Karate-Do Brazil Association, headquartered in Rio de Janeiro, with the approval of Seigo Tada. Américo Machado de Mendonça, known as Sensei Puchy, would join them later.[7] That same year, José Martins Achiam represented Hong Kong in Tokyo, and his contribution was instrumental in the subsequent hosting of the first World Karate Championships (WUKO I) in Hong Kong.[1]

In 1973, César Pereira[10] introduced Seigokan Goju-Ryu Karate-Do to Australia, founding Seigokan Australia.

In 1994, in order to better promote the visibility of Macau karate, José Martins Achiam encouraged the unification of all schools in the territory, promoting the creation of the Macau Karatedo Association (AKM)[1], of which he was the founder and re-elected president. Macau karate began to be recognized and awarded in a series of international competitions.

In the same decade, he was elected Secretary-General of the Asian Karate Federation (AKF) and a member of the Executive Committee of the World Karate Federation (WKF), where he was responsible for China’s admission to the organization[1]. Together with Bill Mok (7th Dan), head of the Hong Kong Seigokan, he developed the project for the International Goju-Ryu Seigokan Karate Federation (IGKSF), which was approved by Seigo Tada. In July 2006, he presided over the first training session for Chinese karate coaches organized by the Chinese Karatedo Association, the precursor to the Chinese Karatedo Federation, and was subsequently appointed Secretary-General of the AKF to promote and secure the official inclusion of this sport in the Asian Games in Seoul[1]. In 2008, he was appointed to the Macau Sports Committee.

For over 40 years, José Martins Achiam promoted the spread of karate in Macau and around the world, ensuring the international prestige of this discipline. He thus became known locally as “Shihan,” “Master,” and “father of karate.” One of his students[6] was the Macao athlete Paula Cristina Pereira Carion, winner of the gold medal at the 2005 East Asian Games, held in Macao, and the bronze medal at the 2006, 2010, and 2014 Asian Games.
