= Karate at the 2005 World Games – Women's kata =

Women's kata at the 2005 World Games
- Venue: Kfraftzentrale
- Date: 24 July 2005
- Competitors: 8 from 7 nations

Medalists
| 1st place, gold medalist(s) | | (Japan) Atsuko Wakai |
| 2nd place, silver medalist(s) | | (France) Myriam Szkudlarek |
| 3rd place, bronze medalist(s) | | (Venezuela) Ana Martínez |

The women's kata competition in karate at the 2005 World Games took place on 24 July 2005 at the Kfraftzentrale in Duisburg, Germany.

== Competition format ==
A total of 8 athletes entered the competition. In elimination round they fought in two groups. From this stage the best two athletes qualifies to the semifinals.

== Results ==
=== Elimination round ===
==== Group A ====
| Rank | Athlete | B | W | D | L | Pts | Score |
|---|---|---|---|---|---|---|---|
| 1 | Myriam Szkudlarek (FRA) | 3 | 3 | 0 | 0 | 6 | 8–1 |
| 2 | Ana Martínez (VEN) | 3 | 2 | 0 | 1 | 4 | 7–2 |
| 3 | Miora Razafindrakoto (MAD) | 3 | 1 | 0 | 2 | 2 | 2–7 |
| 4 | Natasha Hardy (AUS) | 3 | 0 | 0 | 3 | 0 | 1–8 |

| | Score | |
|---|---|---|
| Myriam Szkudlarek (FRA) | 3–0 | Miora Razafindrakoto (MAD) |
| Natasha Hardy (AUS) | 0–3 | Ana Martínez (VEN) |
| Myriam Szkudlarek (FRA) | 3–0 | Natasha Hardy (AUS) |
| Miora Razafindrakoto (MAD) | 0–3 | Ana Martínez (VEN) |
| Myriam Szkudlarek (FRA) | 2–1 | Ana Martínez (VEN) |
| Miora Razafindrakoto (MAD) | 2–1 | Natasha Hardy (AUS) |

==== Group B ====
| Rank | Athlete | B | W | D | L | Pts | Score |
|---|---|---|---|---|---|---|---|
| 1 | Atsuko Wakai (JPN) | 2 | 2 | 0 | 0 | 4 | 6–0 |
| 2 | Yohana Sánchez (VEN) | 2 | 1 | 0 | 1 | 2 | 3–3 |
| 3 | Lim Lee Lee (MAS) | 2 | 0 | 0 | 2 | 0 | 0–6 |
| | Alessandra Caribe (BRA) | DNS | | | | | |

| | Score | |
|---|---|---|
| Yohana Sánchez (VEN) | 0–3 | Atsuko Wakai (JPN) |
| Lim Lee Lee (MAS) | 0–3 | Atsuko Wakai (JPN) |
| Lim Lee Lee (MAS) | 0–3 | Yohana Sánchez (VEN) |

=== Finals ===
Semifinals
Myriam Szkudlarek (FRA) | 2
Yohana Sánchez (VEN) | 1
Atsuko Wakai (JPN) | 3
Ana Martínez (VEN) | 0

Final
Myriam Szkudlarek (FRA) | 2
Atsuko Wakai (JPN) | 3
Third place
Yohana Sánchez (VEN) | 1
Ana Martínez (VEN) | 2
