= Quadrado =

Quadrado is Portuguese for "square". It may refer to:

- Quadrado (dance step) a dance step
- José María Quadrado (1819–1896), Spanish historian and writer
- Quadrado, the name of the town square in some places, such as Trancoso, Bahia

== See also ==
- Cuadrado, a surname
