= José Santana (karateka) =

Portuguese karateka

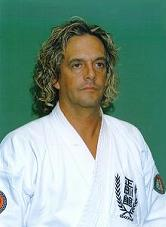
- Santana Shihan (7th Dan)
- Born: May 17, 1957 (age 69); Lisbon, Portugal
- Style: Boxing, Taekwondo, and Seigokan
- Teachers: Seigo Tada, Katsumune Nagai
- Rank: 7th dan Seigokan

Other information
- Website: aksp-seigokan.blogspot.com

José Manuel Guerreiro Santana (born May 17, 1957, in Lisbon, Portugal) is a karateka, and a two-time world champion in kumite.

== Biography ==
José Santana started practicing martial arts at the age of fourteen under Luís Cunha, a Shotokan Karate instructor at Ginásio Clube Português (GCP) in Lisbon. He later trained at the Budo School in Sapadores, where Mitsuharu Tsuchiya founded Goju-ryu Seigokan.

In addition to karate, Santana pursued boxing, achieving national championship titles for two consecutive years and securing a spot on Portugal's Olympic team for the 1980 Moscow games. After a hiatus in Seigokan's practice in Portugal, he trained in Taekwondo at Sporting Clube de Portugal under Chung Sun Yong. Santana traveled to Japan and Macau multiple times, where he met Kata World Champion Atsuko Wakai to participate in seminars, championships and to take his Dan grading tests at Hombu Dojo of Seigokan, in the city of Himeji, Japan.

In 1998, Santana became the Seigokan Karate World Champion in Kumite and World Vice-Champion in Kata. He repeated this achievement in 2004 by again becoming the Seigokan World Champion in Kumite. In 2008, he achieved the 6th Dan rank and was appointed Chief Instructor of Seigokan for Portugal and Europe, a charge usually played by Japanese Masters.

In 2012, Santana was appointed a full member of the Nippon Seigokan Board of Directors by the Seigokan Japanese Masters collective at the annual meeting at Hombu Dojo in Himeji.

In July 2017, Santana obtained the 7th Dan grade with distinction at an examination held at the Budokan in Himeji, Japan, under the supervision of a jury of several Grand Masters of Seigokan.

== Bibliography ==
- "Seigokan Portugal (Genesis) - Photo Album" by AKSP. CreateSpace Edition (2017); ISBN 978-1981352623
- "História da Seigokan em Portugal" by Eduardo Lopes. Bubok Edition (2015); ISBN 978-84-686-6750-8
- "Karate-do Seigokan em Macau - UMA LONGA HISTÓRIA DE SUCESSOS". CreateSpace Publishing (2017); ISBN 978-1981340231

== Press ==
- "Destak" Newspaper
- "Cinturão Negro n.172" Magazine
- "Cinturão Negro n.181" Magazine
- "Ripa Desporto" Newspaper
- "Sem Mais" Newspaper
