= Tiago Silva =

Tiago Silva may refer to:

- Tiago Silva (footballer, born 1979), Bulgarian footballer who played as a defender
- Tiago da Silva (born 1985), Brazilian baseball pitcher
- Tiago Silva (footballer, born 1991), Portuguese footballer who plays as a full-back
- Tiago Silva (footballer, born 1993), Portuguese footballer who plays as a midfielder
- Tiago Silva (footballer, born 2000), Portuguese footballer who plays as a goalkeeper
- Tiago Silva (footballer, born 2007), Portuguese football midfielder for Porto B

== See also ==
- Thiago Silva (disambiguation)
