= Jean-Pierre Warner =

British jurist (1924–2005)

Jean-Pierre Frank Eugene Warner (24 September 1924 – 1 February 2005) was a jurist who served as the first British Advocate-General of the European Court of Justice after Britain's entry into the European Community in 1972. Warner was educated at Trinity College, Cambridge, serving as an officer of the Rifle Brigade during the Second World War before starting his career as a barrister. Appointed Advocate-General in 1972, he returned to England in 1981, where he was made a judge of the High Court of Justice, retiring in 1994 and dying in 2005.

== Biography ==
Warner was born on 24 September 1924, to an English father, who died when he was 4, and a French mother. He was educated in France, first at Ste Croix de Neuilly and then at the École des Roches, before transferring to Harrow in 1938. After leaving Harrow he went to Trinity College, Cambridge to study history before being commissioned into the Rifle Brigade as a second lieutenant on 23 October 1943. He later served on Lord Mountbatten's personal staff, becoming an acting major by the end of the Second World War at age 22. He retained a reserve commission until at least 1949. After demobilisation in 1947 he returned to Trinity College, reading law for a year and graduating with first-class honours.

He became a member of Lincoln's Inn in 1950, being called to the Bar in the same year, and practised at the Chancery Bar, soon acquiring a strong practice. In 1961, he became junior counsel to the Registrar of Restrictive Practices, and in 1964 became junior counsel to HM Treasury. When Britain joined the European Community in 1972, Warner, a French-speaking lawyer, was sent to Luxembourg as Britain's first Advocate-General. He was appointed Queen's Counsel on 2 November 1972. After returning to Britain in 1981 he became a judge of the High Court of Justice's Chancery Division on 3 March, receiving the customary knighthood on 20 May 1981. He retired in 1994. He was appointed Grand Cross of the Order of Merit of the Grand Duchy of Luxembourg in 1998. He was awarded honorary degrees from the University of Leicester, University of Exeter and University of Edinburgh. He died on 1 February 2005, aged 80.

== Arms ==
Coat of arms of Jean-Pierre Warner

Motto
Honore Et Labore

== See also ==
- List of members of the European Court of Justice
