= Johnny H. Hayes =

American politician (1941–2008)

Johnny H. Hayes (1941 – 20 September 2008) was a Democratic fundraiser and politician from Tennessee. Hayes is best known for his effort as finance chief for Al Gore's presidential campaigns, both in 1988 and in 2000. Hayes had been with Gore since he managed the finances of Gore's congressional campaign in 1976, and later for his Senate elections in 1984 and 1990. Hayes also held similar positions for Tennessee Governor Phil Bredesen for the 2002 and 2006 campaigns. As vice president, Gore made Hayes director of the Tennessee Valley Authority in 1993. This post he held until 1999, when he left to manage Gore's presidential campaign.

Haynes graduated from Tennessee Technological University in 1961. He died 20 September 2008 in Sideview, Tennessee from stomach cancer. He and his wife, Mary Howard Reese Hayes, had three children.
