= Irene Cuadrado =

Spanish painter (born 1979)

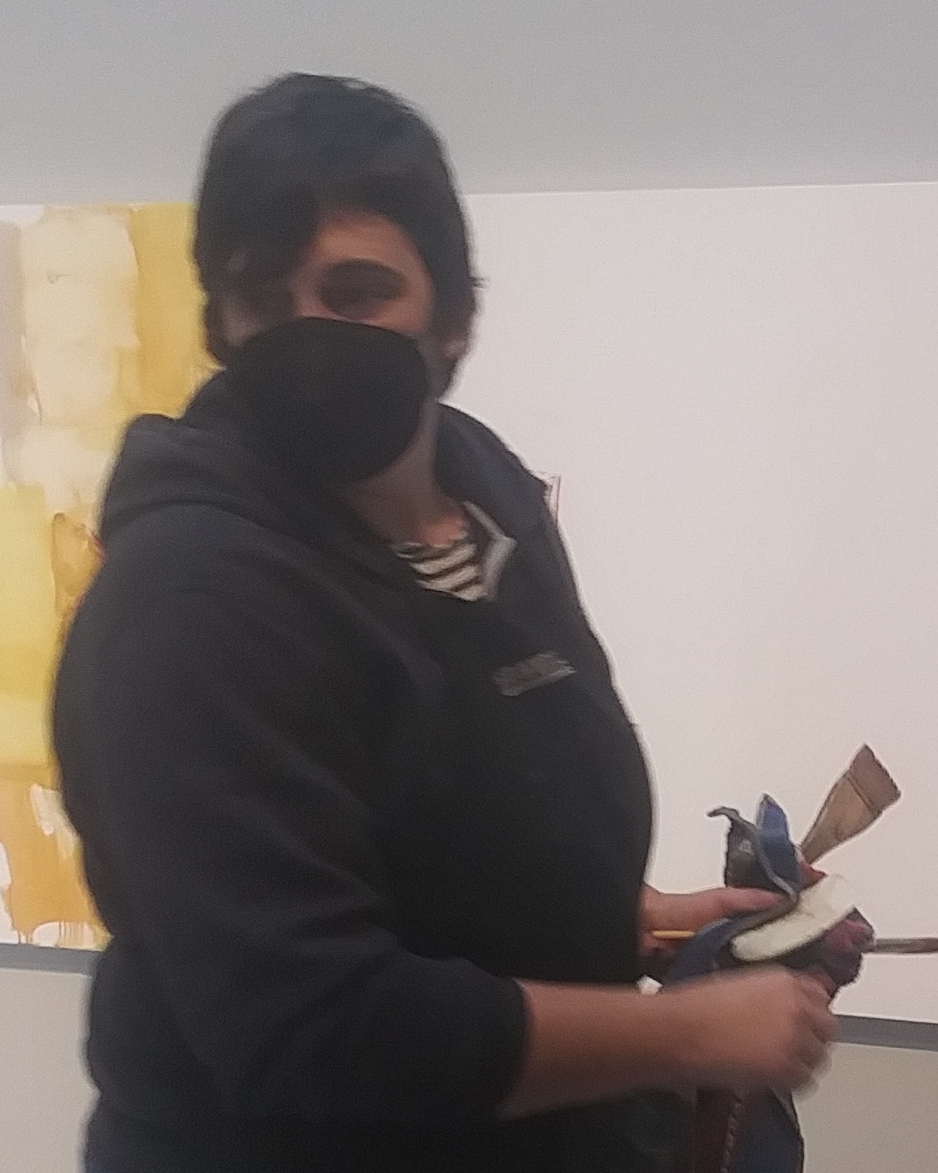
- Irene Cuadrado in 2021
- Born: 1979 (age 46–47); Madrid, Spain
- Education: Complutense University of Madrid
- Occupation: Painter

Irene Cuadrado Hernández (born 1979) is a Spanish painter.

== Career ==
Irene graduated in Fine Arts from the Complutense University of Madrid in 2006. She has taught painting classes as a tutor, including in a course at Casa de Vacas in Madrid's Retiro Park in 2017. In 2015, Her work Madre, 1979, oil painting 148x121 cm, was selected to participate in the Figurative exhibition at the European Museum of Modern Art. Between December 3 and 26, 2021, he presented his exhibition “Process and Excess” at the Casa de Vacas, and in 2022 he presented his exhibition 'Entremedias; Lo visible' at the Sala Rivadavia of the Cádiz Provincial Council.

In January 2024 he exhibited his painting “Intertwined Locations”, an oil on canvas, at the Quan Shanshi Art Center in Hangzhou and the National Centre for the Performing Arts of China as part of a joint traveling exhibition of contemporary painting from Spain and China. The same year he participated in the exhibition “Beyond Realism, Figurative Art from China and Spain” with his painting “La noche II”, an oil on canvas panel measuring 150x150 centimeters, exhibited in China and at the Royal Palace of Madrid.

== Awards ==
Among the awards he has received are the XXXVII Edition of the outdoor painting contest “San Miguel” of Pravia in 2011, the first prize in the XIII edition of the Speed Painting Contest of Trillo and in the XXXI Outdoor Painting Contest of Tazones, and the Diputación Award XXVIII Award López-Villaseñor Award of Ciudad Real in 2019, among others.

== Personal life ==
Irene has her workshop in Ciempozuelos and has two daughters: Gala and Vera.
