= Helen Galland =

Helen Galland (June 1, 1925 – September 1, 2008) was an American retail executive and businesswoman who served as president of Bonwit Teller from 1980 to 1983. The New York Times described her as "one of the few women of her time to run a fashion-oriented retailer". She was also the first woman to serve on the board of the Whitman Corporation.

== Early life ==
Galland was born in Brooklyn, New York, an only child, and grew up in Washington Heights, Manhattan. She earned a degree in psychology from Hunter College.

== Career ==
In 1945, while taking graduate classes in retailing at New York University, she took a position at Lord & Taylor. After five years, she went to Bonwit Teller as a millinery buyer. When she left Bonwit Teller in 1975 to become President of Wamsutta Trucraft Home Fashions, she had risen to senior vice president and general merchandise manager. She returned to Bonwit Teller five years later in 1980 as President/CEO. Galland presided from 1980 to 1983, a time when the company's brand had undergone a decline. The company was acquired in 1979 by Allied Stores Corporation, which closed Bonwit-Teller’s flagship store on Fifth Avenue. Galland oversaw the opening of a new Bonwit store, a third the size, in the Trump Tower.

She eventually left Bonwit Teller again to form her own eponymous marketing/consulting firm, Helen Galland Associates. Bonwit Teller and all its remaining stores closed for good in 1990.

== Affiliations ==
She served on the boards of Hunter College and the Fashion Institute of Technology as well as several charities.

== Family ==
Helen Galland's first husband, Samuel Frishberg, a lawyer, died in 1964. She married Frederick E. Loewus, a handbag manufacturer, in 1967; he died in 2006. She had a son David Frishberg of VA, two daughters, Susan Frishberg of VT, Judy Frishberg of Jackson New Jersey and two stepchildren, all of whom survived her.

David Frishberg said of his mother: "She was the kind of woman who could follow you into a revolving door and come out in front of you".

== Death ==
Galland died of a heart attack at a Manhattan restaurant, aged 83.
