= John Usher (cricketer) =

Irish cricketer

Personal information
- Full name: John Usher
- Born: 26 February 1859; Templemore, Ireland
- Died: 9 August 1905 (aged 46); Haslingden, Lancashire, England
- Batting: Left-handed
- Bowling: Slow left-arm orthodox

Domestic team information
- Years: Team
- 1888: Yorkshire

Career statistics
| Competition | First-class |
|---|---|
| Matches | 1 |
| Runs scored | 7 |
| Batting average | 3.50 |
| 100s/50s | –/– |
| Top score | 5 |
| Balls bowled | 72 |
| Wickets | 2 |
| Bowling average | 15.50 |
| 5 wickets in innings | – |
| 10 wickets in match | – |
| Best bowling | 2/11 |
| Catches/stumpings | 1/– |
- Source: Cricinfo, 7 November 2018

John Usher (26 February 1859 – 9 August 1905) was an Irish first-class cricketer, who played one match for Yorkshire County Cricket Club in 1888.

Born in Templemore, County Tipperary, Ireland, Usher was a slow left arm orthodox spinner, who took two wickets for 31 runs, and scored seven runs at an average of 3.50, in his match against the MCC. The MCC won the game by 103 runs.

Usher died in August 1905 in Haslingden, Lancashire, England. He drowned himself in a pond.
