= El Fua =

2011 viral YouTube video

A still photo of the Noche de Emergencias program, depicting Julio Segura yelling Fua.

El FUA (Universal Applied Force, or Fuerza Universal Aplicada in Spanish) is an Internet meme involving a viral YouTube video of an intoxicated Mexican man called Julio César Segura, who claims to have divine powers, including fortune-telling and revival of the dead.

El Fua became popular after an online news program, Nayarit en Línea, from Nayarit, Mexico, uploaded the video to YouTube.

== Origin ==
In June 2011, while Fabián García, journalist of Nayarit en Línea was with a group of rescuers in Tepic's headquarters to the National Commission of Emergencies, a man called Julio César Segura "asked [them] for a cigarette in exchange for 'reading their hand'." After noticing there were journalists in the place, he asked them to record him, and afterwards he explained what El Fua was: a "method of personal growth."

Segura asked the journalist to interview him, because he wanted to send greetings to his wife and sons, whom he claimed to be living in Mexico City. Recorded bits of the interview appeared for the first time in Noche de Emergencias, on Nayarit en Línea.

=== Identity ===
Julio César Segura was a seminarist and a waiter; he told press he had to leave his family because of his alcoholism. He also said he would "get rid of his alcoholism [in order] to get a new life," because he was homeless. Segura also said he had the ability to 'read the hands' (fortune-telling) and to revive the dead.

He resides in the city of Tepic, in the state of Nayarit, Mexico. He is also now nicknamed the Fua, after the meme.

== Spread ==
The video showing Segura, lasting two minutes and forty-seven seconds, was uploaded to YouTube by a user on June 27, 2011; two days later, it had 379,107 views. In late June 2011, the hashtag #fuaaa, the phrase Fuerza Universal Aplicada, and the word Fua became global trending topics on Twitter. The YouTube video had nearly six million views as of January 2015.

=== Appearances and parodies ===
Julio César Cavadia has also made appearances on television, such as on Televisa's game show Sabadazo, on July 16, 2011. According to Milenio, Segura was 'mockingly interviewed' on that program; an El Fua song and a dance were also created for Sabadazo.

El Fua has also been parodied, by example, in a video called El Fua y sus aplicaciones en la vida diaria (English: The Fua and its applications in everyday life), in which four youngs recorded a video through Ustream showing moments in which the Fua would be necessarily used. A Flash game inspired in the Fua was released on July 7, 2011 by Héctor and Alejandro Sobrevilla Viveros, called El Fuaaa!!.

The Fua was also used as a chant in a football match, the final one of the 2011 FIFA U-17 World Cup in Mexico, held on July 10, 2011 between the host country and Uruguay. Attendants shouted Fua every time the Mexican goalkeeper Richard Sánchez kicked the ball. "[El Fua] will most likely become a trend featured in every Primera División and International match where Mexican fans are supporting their team, [...] El Fua is a perfect example of the power of social media and the effect it has in the sports we love," wrote Edgar Álvarez on football-only, English-language online newspaper FMF State of Mind.

In Chile, "the Fua concept" has been used during the 2011 protests for free and better education in several occasions by students occupying schools or in barricades. "Go Penguins (secondary students)! Fuaa!!! Resist the commercial boot!," the Las Últimas Noticias newspaper put in a headline; the newspaper also called using the "Fua philosophy [in the protests] is an outstanding success that floods Chile." The Fua was also used by Chilean football fans during the 2011 Copa América held in Argentina. "We've got to put Fuaa to things; if something's bad, it's because it doesn't have enough Fuaa," Chilean journalist Nicolás Copano told Las Últimas Noticias.

Julio César Segura most recently appeared in a Netflix ad, in which he further explains and develops the Fua philosophy in order to eventually promote the Cobra Kai show. Responding to a user who expressed their desire for the figure to be "paid well" for his appearance, the streaming network jokingly replied that "They paid him with FUA".

== 'Fua philosophy' ==
Julio Segura's Fua has been called a 'philosophy' by some news sources. Segura said in the viral video that El Fua means to "bring out one's character, force, power," and affirmed it was "some kind of inner willforce when you can't or you think you can't do more." "The Fua means when you extract the character from your stomach and you say, 'I will do it'," he said.

Segura said on Televisa's Sabadazo that "being the communicator of the Fua is a social responsibility." FMF State of Mind described the Fua, based on Segura's tellings, as "that 'extra' we possess as humans, an unexplainable source of energy within us to give more than what we are capable of." It has been also proposed that Fua means Fuerza Universal Aplicada (English: Applied Universal Force).

== See also ==
- Guillermo López Langarica, mostly known as "the Canaca"
