= Lobsang Nyima Pal Sangpo =

Lobsang Nyima Rinpoche(second from right), visiting Grandmaster Sheng-Yen Lu at the Ling Shen Ching Tze Temple.

Lobsang Nyima Pal Sangpo (1929 – September 14, 2008), also known as Lobsang Nyima Rinpoche, a Tibetan religious leader, was the 100th Ganden Tripa, or spiritual leader of the Gelug school of Tibetan Buddhism from 1994 until 2002.

Lobsang Nyima was born in 1929 to parents, Lobsang Tsering and Yeshi Lhamo. Nyima began his studies in the "Five Treatises of Buddhism" in 1945 when he was seventeen years old at Drepung Loseling Monastic University in Tibetan under the instruction of the Dalai Lama.

His many degrees and spiritual positions included a degree of Lharampa Geshe, Jangtse Choeje, serving as abbot of Namgyal Monastery, abbot of Gyudmed Tantric University, and an honorary doctorate degree from the Tibetan Institute of Higher Studies in Varanasi, India. Nyima was also well versed in both poetry and grammar.

Lobsang Nyima was elevated to the highest position in the Gelug school of Tibetan Buddhism in 1994, becoming the 100th Ganden Tripa. The Ganden Tripa is the spiritual leader of the Gelug school. He remained Ganden Tripa until 2002, when he was succeeded by the Venerable Khensur Lungri Namgyel.

== Writings ==
Examples of Lobsang Nyima Pal Sangpo's major writings included:

- Religious History and Prayers for Lineages of abbots of Gyudmed Tantric Monastery
- Prayers for Long-Life and Swift Return of Incarnations of Many High Lamas
- An Eulogy of Maitreya (Gyalwa Jampa)

== Death ==
Lobsang Nyima Pal Sangpo, the "100th holder of Ganden Tripa," died at Kles Hospital and MRC in Belgaum, India, on September 14, 2008, after a brief illness. He was 79 years old.
