= Olli Auero =

Finnish diplomat

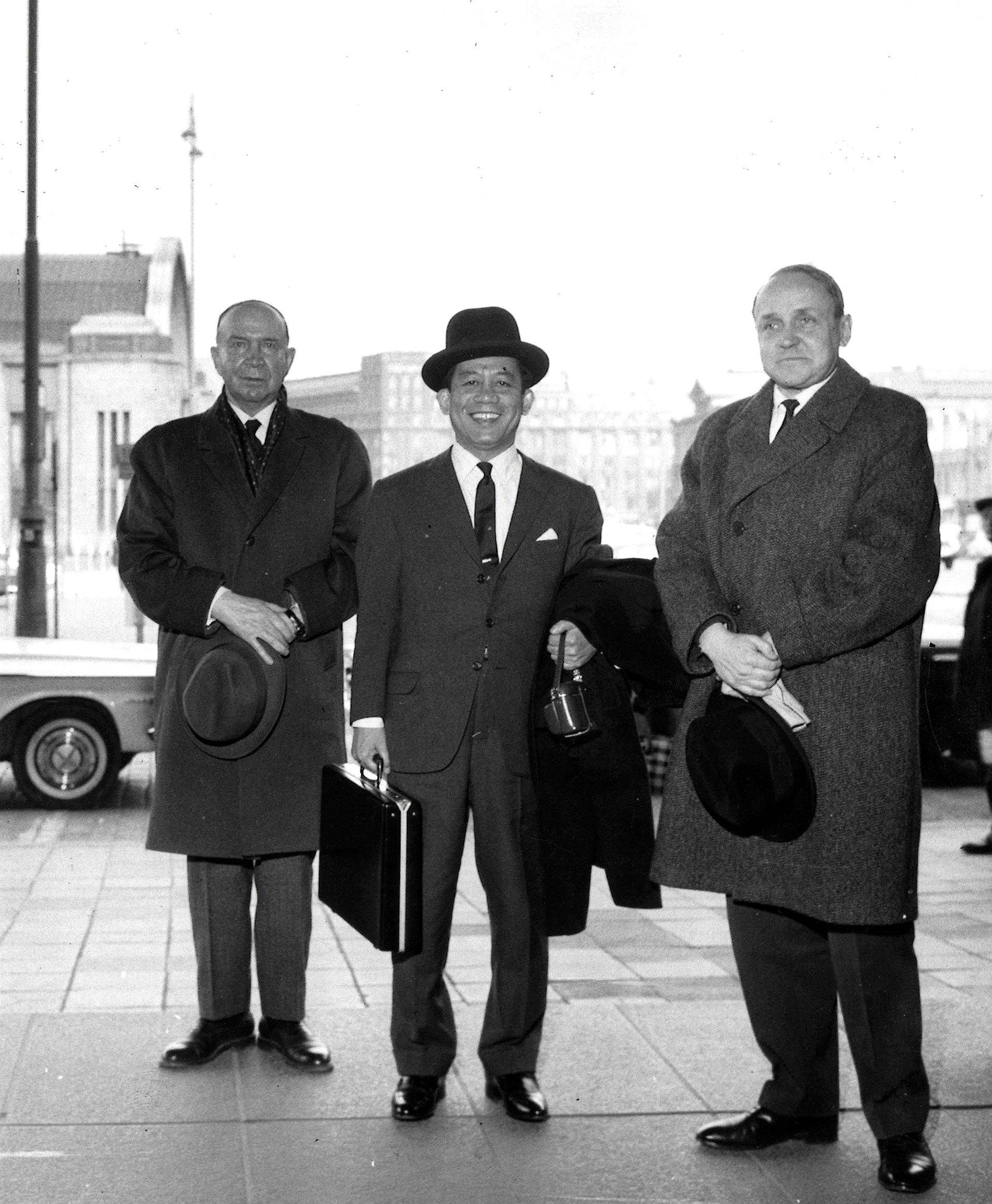
Olli Auero (right) receiving the Ambassador of the Philippines Melchor P. Aquino in 1964. On the left, Lieutenant General Paavo Talvela.

Olli Johannes Auero (12 May 1926 – 22 September 2008) was a Finnish diplomat.

Auero was born in Helsinki and has a master's degree in political science. He worked as ambassador in Lagos from 1969 to 1971, was deputy director of the Department for Ministry for Foreign Affairs, 1971–1976, Ambassador in Prague from 1976 to 1980, Cairo from 1980 to 1984, Head of the Protocol Department of the Ministry for Foreign Affairs 1984–1988 and Ambassador in Lisbon 1988–1991.
