= David Laycock =

English cricketer

Personal information
- Full name: David Allen Laycock
- Born: 2 September 1947; Woolwich, London
- Died: 16 September 2008 (aged 61); Eastbourne, Sussex
- Batting: Right-handed

Domestic team information
- Years: Team
- 1969–1973: Kent
- FC debut: 6 August 1969 Kent v Leicestershire
- Last FC: 18 July 1973 Kent v West Indians
- LA debut: 14 August 1969 Kent v Yorkshire
- Last LA: 16 August 1973 Kent v Lancashire

Career statistics
Competition	First-class	List A
Matches	10	5
Runs scored	266	34
Batting average	19.00	11.33
100s/50s	0/1	0/0
Top score	58	23
Catches/stumpings	2/0	0/0
- Source: Cricinfo, 5 April 2014

David Allen Laycock (2 September 1947 – 16 September 2008) was an English professional cricketer. He played for Kent County Cricket Club between 1969 and 1973.

Laycock was born at Woolwich in east London in 1947. He first played for Kent's Second XI in 1966 and went on to make his first-class cricket debut in August 1969 against Leicestershire at Canterbury. After making five appearances for the First XI in 1969, including one in the John Player League, Laycock appeared infrequently for the side in the coming years. He made a total of 10 first-class (Note: The CricInfo article announcing Laycock's death makes reference to 12 first-class appearances, but statistics from CricInfo, CricketArchive and Kent County Cricket Club all agree on him having made 10 first-class appearances.) and five List A appearances for Kent between his debut and his final match in August 1973, playing as a batsman and occasional wicket-keeper in a strong Kent side which won the County Championship in 1970 and one-day trophies in each season between 1972 and 1974.

Despite playing 69 matches for the Second XI, including scoring runs during 1974, (Note: CricInfo's article announcing his death says that Laycock played for Sussex County Cricket Club's Second XI between 1966 and 1974. This is an error - he only played for Kent.) Laycock was released by Kent at the endow the 1974 season. He became a postman, although he continued to coach cricket.

Laycock died at Eastbourne in Sussex in September 2008 after a long battle with brain cancer. He was 61.
