= Guillermo López Langarica =

Mexican YouTube celebrity (1968–2008)

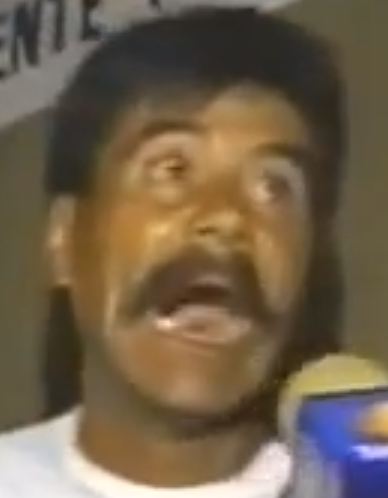
El Canaca

Guillermo López Langarica (1968 – 25 September 2008) was a Mexican YouTube celebrity, who accidentally rose to fame in 2007. Prior to his death, he was mostly known as El Canaca, (the Canaca guy). He was later remembered as 'Don Memo'.

== Early life ==
López Langarica was born in 1968 in El Salto, Jalisco. Before the 2002 incident that ultimately led to his viral fame years later, López Langarica lived the life of an ordinary businessman or merchant (comerciante). He was involved in the sale of food products, operating primarily in the region around the Central de Abastos (Supply Center) in Guadalajara.

== Rise to fame ==
López Langarica came to the public spotlight when he was detained in Guadalajara, Jalisco, for speed-driving under the influence of alcohol in 2002. He was interviewed and featured in the TV show El Show de la Barandilla, which mostly aired comical police interventions against drunks, through Canal 4 de Guadalajara, a company belonging to the Televisa consortium. A few years later, his video was uploaded to YouTube and quickly gained notoriety.

In the video, he explains how he was wrongly detained, as he was drunk-driving but had not 'crashed yet'. He claimed the police officers robbed him of $50,000 Mexican pesos, explaining he had a pack of a hundred $500 pesos bills. (Y mis cincuenta mil pesos ¿qué?) When asked about his income's origins he claimed to work at Promotora Mexicana Gaitán, a commerce located at Calle 6 No.630 with phone number of 671-33-33 (with the then recent change from 7- to 8-digit phone numbers gone into effect two years earlier, in his inebriated state he forgot to mention a 3 before the phone number). He identified himself as the son o the owner, Miguel Ángel Gaytán Uribe, who also allegedly served as President of an organization called CANACA, an acronym ghat he said stands for 'Centrales de Abastos de la República Mexicana'. Finally, he asked the cameraman to tape his right ankle, angrily accusing the officers of restraining him like a pig. (¡Me amarraron como puerco!)

The YouTube video was an instant phenomenon, receiving over ten million views as of 2022. López Langarica rose to national fame because of his comical explanation of events, places, and his catchphrases '¿Y qué? No he chocado' (So what? I haven't crashed yet), 'Apúntele bien' ("Write this down"), 'Soy hijo del papá' (I'm son of the father) referring to his relation with "the owner", '¡Me amarraron como puerco!' (They tied me like a pig!!), and his definition of CANACA.

== Truthfulness of statements ==
Mexico has no organization named CANACA, although Cámara Nacional de Comercio (CANACO), Confederación Nacional de Agrupaciones de Comerciantes de Centros de Abastos (CONACCA), and Cámara Nacional de Autotransportes de Carga (CANACAR) do exist.

Promotora Mexicana Gaitán (PROMEGA) does exist. It trades in fruits and vegetables, specially strawberries, with offices in Guadalajara and Mexico City. The former is located at 630 6th Street. The phone number is +52(33)3671-3333. Whether López Langarica worked there is unknown. No one by the name Miguel Ángel Gaytán works at PROMEGA, but a Miguel Ángel Gaytán Uribe served as the vigilancy committee's president at the Unión de Comerciantes del Mercado de Abastos de Guadalajara (UCMA).

== Death ==
On the night of September 25, 2008, López Langarica was run over in Guadalajara by a Dodge Neon, driven by an intoxicated Silvia Teresa Borbón Valenzuela. He was sober. When the police arrived, the woman claimed someone had put the body under her car. The scene immediately made it to national news.

== Legacy ==
Numerous parodies and tributes spawned after the original video's popularity, including imitations, animated versions, musical remixes, and even religious prayers. Other Mexican drunken celebrities have gained fame, such as Dios Eolo (God Aeolus), Dulce Sarahí Villarreal, the Ni Merga guy, the Sicarios de Montemorelos (Montemorelos killers), the Tengo Miedo (I'm Afraid) guy, and Me Estoy yendo por la Banqueta, (I'm on the Sidewalk) amongst others.

After López Langarica's death tribute and farewell videos appeared in YouTube. T-shirts imprinted with his famous phrases or the Mexican soccer team Atlas's logo are for sale in some street markets. Many YouTube users posted in memoriam comments below his famous video, while some users encourage fans to call and denounce Silvia Teresa Borbón, while doxxing her.

Some Guadalajarans claimed to have witnessed López Langarica's ghost, leading users on the net to jokingly refer to him as San Canaca.

== See also ==
- El Fua, another Mexican Internet meme
