= John Usher (legal scholar) =

- Born: 12 August 1945; Hyde, Cheshire
- Died: 13 September 2008 (aged 62); Exeter, Devon
- Occupation: Legal academic

John Usher FRSE (12 August 1945 – 13 September 2008) was a British academic specialising in European law. Educated at Newcastle University, he earned a scholarship to study French private law at the University of Nancy, working as an assistant at the University of Exeter after his graduation. In 1974 he became the secretary of Jean Pierre Warner at the European Court of Justice, a position he held for four years before becoming a lecturer at the University of Edinburgh, where he stayed until 1983, when he moved to University College London. In 1986 he became Professor of European Law at the University of Exeter before returning to the University of Edinburgh in 1995 to be Edinburgh as Salvesen Professor and Director of the Europa Institute. In 2004 he again returned to Exeter as head of the School of Law. Planning early retirement, Usher was diagnosed with leukaemia, and died on 13 September 2008.

== Life ==
Usher was born on 12 August 1945 and educated at Hyde Grammar School and Newcastle University, graduating in 1966 and receiving a scholarship to study French private law at the University of Nancy. After receiving his degree he worked as an assistant to Professor Dominik Lasok at the University of Exeter, one of the "only [two] universities in the UK that took seriously the study of European law and institutions". After the United Kingdom joined the European Economic Community, Usher was recruited to be the secretary of Jean Pierre Warner at the European Court of Justice, a position he held between 1974 and 1978, dealing with "technical problems of customs, restrictions on imports and exports, and the minutiae of the Common Agricultural Policy" which gave him a good grasp on the intricacies of European law.

In 1978, Usher took up a post as a lecturer at the University of Edinburgh, under John Mitchell, who died two years later and left Usher in charge of maintaining the Centre of European Governmental Studies (now the Europa Institute) at the university during a period of budget cuts. He published European Community Law and National Law: The Irreversible Transfer in 1981, which has been called "highly influential", followed by European Court Practice in 1983, a "well-thought out, lucid and also readable guide to the practice of the Court of Justice". In 1983 he moved to University College London, where he taught for two years before moving to the University of Exeter in 1986 as Professor of European Law and head of the Centre for European Legal Studies, where he stayed until 1995. While at Exeter he published The Legal Foundations of the Single European Market and the Oxford EC Law Library, in 1988 and 1991 respectively. In 1993 he was elected a Bencher of Lincoln's Inn and at the same time called to the Bar.

In 1995, he returned to the University of Edinburgh as Salvesen Professor and Director of the Europa Institute, where he spent three years as Dean of Law and published General Principles of EC Law and EC Institutions and Legislation (both 1998), along with The State of the European Union (2000) and The Treaty of Nice and Beyond – Enlargement Institutional Reform (2003). He was elected a Fellow of the Royal Society of Edinburgh in 1998. In 2004 he returned to the University of Exeter, where he was Chair of the Department of Law, After deciding to take early retirement he was diagnosed with leukemia, and died on 13 September 2008.

== Bibliography ==
- Gormley, Laurence (2008). "Obituary: Professor John Usher (1945-2008)". European Law Review. 33 (6). Sweet & Maxwell. ISSN 0307-5400.
