= Lynn Kohlman =

American model and photographer (1946–2008)

- Lynn Kohlman on the Oprah Winfrey Show in 2005
- Born: Lynn Eleanor Kohlman; August 12, 1946; Teaneck, New Jersey, U.S.
- Died: September 14, 2008 (aged 62); Manhattan, New York City, U.S.
- Education: Oberlin College
- Spouse: Mark Obenhaus (m. 1983)
- Children: 1
- Parent: Clement Wolfe Kohlman (1916–2000)

Lynn Eleanor Kohlman (August 12, 1946 – September 14, 2008) was a fashion model, photographer, author, and creative director at DKNY.

== Biography ==
Kohlman was born in Teaneck, New Jersey, to Clement Wolfe Kohlman (1916–2000), and his wife, Eleanor. She majored in art history at Oberlin College, graduating summa cum laude, and was a member of Phi Beta Kappa society. While at Oberlin, she spent one semester in Florence, Italy, helping restore works of art.

She began as a fashion model while in high school and appeared on the covers of major fashion magazines.

In the 1970s, she was a photographer for Interview, Vogue, GQ and Glamour. In 1983, she married Mark Obenhaus, a documentary film producer that she had known as a student at Oberlin College.

In 1989 she was appointed the fashion director of the Donna Karan Company and later was involved with Tommy Hilfiger's launch of his women's wear line. In 2002, she was diagnosed first with breast cancer, then with glioblastoma multiforme, a brain cancer. She appeared on The Oprah Winfrey Show.

One day while I was going through all this [the mastectomy], two friends stopped by my New York apartment. I told them, "This wouldn't be so bad, but my breasts were the best part of my body." And one of them said: "Pick something else." So I decided to love my legs, which had always been the least favorite part of my body. Today I feel more beautiful than I ever did, which is one of the main reasons the book is called Front to Back.

She died on September 14, 2008, from complications from her cancer. In British newspaper The Guardian, Kohlman was described as "the beautiful public body of cancer":

She posed for the camera unclothed with both breasts gone, with titanium staples encircling her scalp after a brain operation, with hair frazzled away by radiation. In a radical gesture consistent with her life, she published proximate portraits of her youthful perfection and post-op, scarred self, defiantly lovely, in her autobiography, Lynn Front to Back, published in 2005.

== Personal life ==
She is survived by her husband, Mark Obenhaus, and their son, Sam.

== Publications ==
- Lynn: Front to Back (2005); ISBN 2-84323-576-6
