= Fabiola Salazar =

Peruvian politician (d. 2008)

Fabiola Salazar Leguía

Member of the Congress of Peru
- In office 2006–2008
- Constituency: Amazonas

Personal details
- Born: 1966
- Died: 18 September 2008 (aged 41–42) Near Chiclayo, Peru
- Cause of death: Car accident
- Party: Peruvian Aprista Party
- Children: 2
- Occupation: Medical doctor, Politician
- Profession: Physician

Fabiola Salazar Leguía was a Peruvian medical doctor and politician. For the last two years of her life she was a Congresswoman representing Amazonas from 2006, and belonged to the Peruvian Aprista Party.

== Family ==
Salazar had three sisters and four brothers, all of whom are very successful. She had one son and one daughter.

== Death ==
Salazar died at the age of 42 on September 18, 2008, in a car accident near Chiclayo.
