= Florian Goebel =

German astrophysicist (1972–2008)

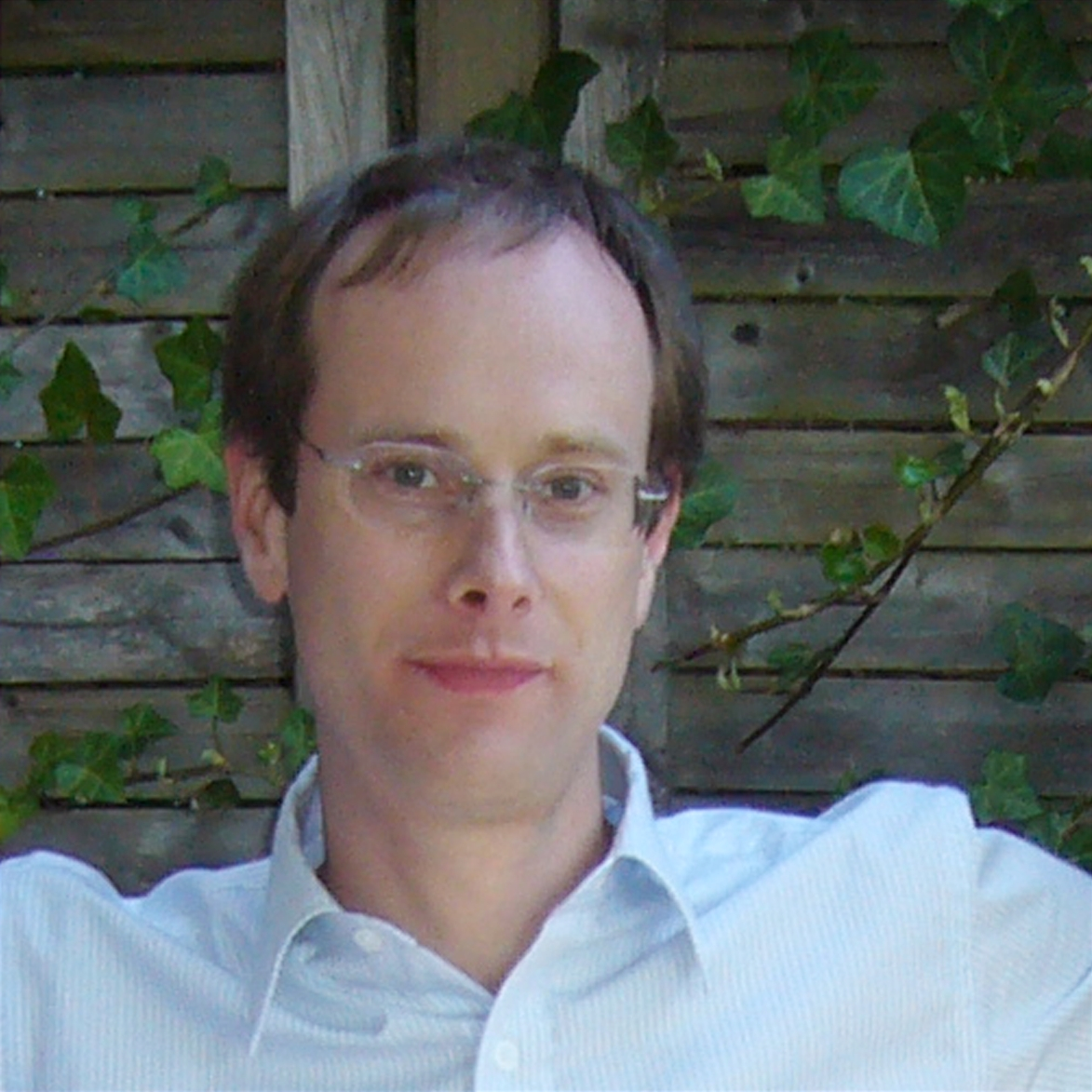
- Born: 18 October 1972; Cologne, Germany
- Died: 10 September 2008 (aged 35); La Palma, Spain
- Education: Heidelberg University; Stony Brook University; DESY in Hamburg
- Known for: MAGIC and MAGIC-II telescopes
- Scientific career
- Fields: Astrophysics
- Workplaces: Max Planck Institute for Physics; Roque de los Muchachos Observatory
- Thesis: Measurement of the Diffactive Contribution to the DIS Cross Section using the ZEUS Forward Plug Calorimeter (2001)
- Website: www-zeus.desy.de/~fgoebel/

Karl Florian Goebel (18 October 1972 — 10 September 2008) was a German astrophysicist attached to the Max Planck Institute for Physics in Munich. He had also been a member of DESY, a German-based research center that develops and runs several particle accelerators and detectors, most notably the ZEUS project.

At the time of his death he was managing the MAGIC-II telescope project. His death led to the suspension of the official inauguration date for MAGIC-II, originally set for 19 September 2008.

== Education and career ==
Goebel graduated from Heidelberg University in July 1995 with an undergraduate degree in Physics. As a recipient of a Fulbright scholarship, he earned his master's degree in Physics from Stony Brook University, the first degree awarded from work with the Stony Brook Nucleon decay and Neutrino Group's participation in the Super-Kamiokande experiment, in December 1996. Goebel completed his PhD in Physics at the DESY in Hamburg in September 2001 as part of his work on the ZEUS project.

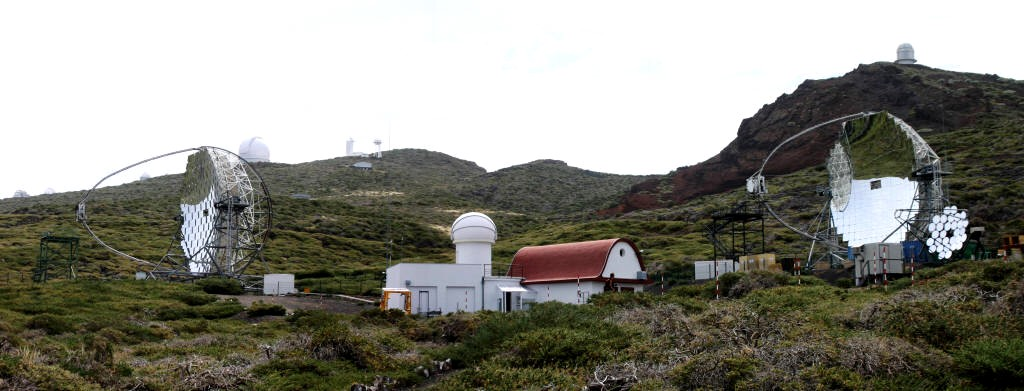
MAGIC telescopes with some of the other facilities at the Roque de los Muchachos Observatory

In 2002, Goebel joined the Max Planck Institute for Physics's MAGIC project, becoming the project manager for MAGIC-II in 2005. MAGIC-II, the companion to the MAGIC (Major Atmospheric Gamma-ray Imaging Cherenkov) telescope, is situated 85 metres from its counterpart at the Roque de los Muchachos Observatory on La Palma, one of the Canary Islands.

== Death and legacy ==
On 10 September 2008, just nine days prior to the scheduled inauguration of MAGIC-II, Goebel fell about 10 metres (33 ft) to his death while changing one of that telescope's lenses, leading to the suspension of the telescope's commencement of operations. After his death, the pair of telescopes were renamed the "MAGIC Florian Goebel Telescopes" in his memory. MAGIC-II had its "first light" on 25 April 2009 after a ceremony during which Goebel's brother assisted with the ribbon-cutting.

== Selected publications ==
- Goebel, Karl Florian (December 1996). "A Study of Particle Identification with the Super-Kamiokande Detector" (PDF). Stony Brook NN Group.
- Bamberger, A; Böttcher, S; Bohnet, I; Fernández, J.P; Goebel, F; et al. (August 2000). "The ZEUS forward plug calorimeter with lead–scintillator plates and WLS fiber readout". Nuclear Instruments and Methods in Physics Research Section A: Accelerators, Spectrometers, Detectors and Associated Equipment. 450 (2–3): 235–252. arXiv:hep-ex/9912045. Bibcode:2000NIMPA.450..235B. doi:10.1016/S0168-9002(00)00274-6. S2CID 7669937.
- Goebel, Florian (October 2000). "Performance of the ZEUS forward plug calorimeter". Nuclear Instruments and Methods in Physics Research Section A: Accelerators, Spectrometers, Detectors and Associated Equipment. 453 (1–2): 230–232. Bibcode:2000NIMPA.453..230G. doi:10.1016/S0168-9002(00)00636-7.
- Goebel, Florian (2001). "Inclusive diffraction at HERA with a measured leading proton" (PDF).
- Bartko, H.; Goebel, F.; Mirzoyan, R.; Pimpl, W.; Teshima, M. (August 2005). "Tests of a prototype multiplexed fiber-optic ultra-fast FADC data acquisition system for the MAGIC telescope". Nuclear Instruments and Methods in Physics Research Section A: Accelerators, Spectrometers, Detectors and Associated Equipment. 548 (3): 464–486. arXiv:astro-ph/0505204. Bibcode:2005NIMPA.548..464B. doi:10.1016/j.nima.2005.05.029. S2CID 13307832.
- Mazin, Daniel; Goebel, Florian (20 January 2007). "Break in the Very High Energy Spectrum of PG 1553+113: New Upper Limit on Its Redshift?". The Astrophysical Journal. 655 (1): L13–L16. arXiv:astro-ph/0611817. Bibcode:2007ApJ...655L..13M. doi:10.1086/511751. S2CID 10322460.
- Cortina, Juan; Goebel, Florian; Schweizer, Thomas (7 July 2009). "Technical Performance of the MAGIC Telescopes". arXiv:0907.1211 [astro-ph.IM].
