= Kune Biezeveld =

Dutch theologian

Kunegonda Elizabeth (Kune) Biezeveld (13 April 1948 – 7 September 2008) was a Dutch theologian. She was a member of the Dutch Reformed Church (since 2004 the Protestant Church in the Netherlands).

Biezeveld was born in The Hague, and studied theology at Leiden University. Afterwards she was a minister in Zandvoort, Voorthuizen and in a hospital in Blaricum.

She took her Doctor of Theology in 1996. In the same year she became a lecturer dogmatics and Biblical theology at Leiden University. She became a personal professor in women's studies theology at the same university in 2002.

Biezeveld was especially interested in feminist theology. She had moderate views of this brand of theology and was in favour of a connection with classical theology.

Kune Biezeveld diedin Hilversum at the age of 60, of pancreatic cancer.

== Books ==
- Spreken over God als vader. Hoe kan het anders?, 1996
- Towards a Different Transcendence. Feminist Findings on Subjectivity, Religion and Values, with Anne-Claire Mulder, 2001
- De splinter en het beeld. Het beeldverbod in klassieke en feministische theologie, oration Leiden University, 2002
- Als scherven spreken. Over God in het leven van alledag, 2008
