= Paul DiLascia =

American software developer

Paul DiLascia (October 9, 1959 – September 3, 2008) was an American software developer, author, web developer and programming journalist and one of the most celebrated columnists for MSDN.

He grew up in Manhattan, where he went to a special high school for smart children. After that he went to Columbia University and MIT, where he got a bachelor's degree in mathematics. After that he studied at Harvard for a year working on a PhD, also in mathematics. There he realised that where in mathematics it was quite hard to contribute something useful, this was not the case in software. At that time it was possible to contribute right away.

In the 1980s he worked for Infocom as a programmer, first on a Zork interpreter for the Commodore 64, and later on the ill-fated Cornerstone database product.

In 1992 he published his influential book, Windows++, one of the first serious attempts at encapsulating the complexity of Windows 3.X programming with C++ classes.

For 13 years he wrote the C++ Q&A column, aka "C++ At Work" for MSDN Magazine.

According to Matt Pietrek (MSDN magazine columnist): "Paul was an amazing technical writer, and one with the gift of adding humor to what could be an otherwise dry topic. Eric Maffei once told me that without humor, MSJ would read like "Microsoft Pravda". Paul's contributions were a big part of why it wasn't."

Paul DiLascia died suddenly on the evening of September 3, 2008. He was only 49 years old at the time. Many present day C++ and MFC programmers still use his reusable modules and pieces of code containing his famous article/code comment: "If this code works, it was written by Paul DiLascia. If not, I don't know who wrote it".

== Selected works ==
- Windows++: Writing Reusable Windows Code in C++ (Addison-Wesley, 1992)
