= Edda and Eduard Paukson =

Estonian astrologers

Edda Paukson (born 10 February 1949) and Eduard Paukson (29 October 1935 – 4 September 2008) were a couple of prominent Estonian astrologers. Together they published a yearly astrological almanac Astroloogiline abimees (The Astrological Guide) until the death of Eduard Paukson.

== Recognition ==
Eduard Paukson is a posthumously honorary member of the Estonian Astrological Association.
