= Gerry White =

Gerard John ("Gerry") White
- Born: 1943; Huyton, Lancashire
- Died: 2008 (aged 64–65); Thurstaston, Merseyside

Gerry White (1943–2008) was a wealthy English born businessman and self-made millionaire.

The son of Gerard and Martha White, Gerry started life as butcher and established Hurstwood Meats in Birkenhead on the Wirral. He later established Reddington Finance Group. He once owned Cammell Laird shipyard in Birkenhead; he purchased it for £10m and sold it for £100m in 2007.

In 1999, he led a consortium to purchase Everton F.C. He was chairman of Wirral Chamber of Commerce group.

He died age 64 in September 2008.
