= Fran Reed =

American fiber artist and teacher

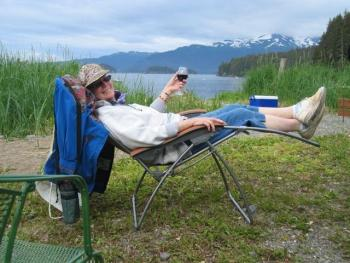
- Born: June 12, 1943; La Jolla, California
- Died: September 11, 2008 (aged 65); Anchorage, Alaska
- Occupations: Artist, fiber artist, teacher
- Spouse: Dick Reed

Frances Ann Reed (née Williams; June 12, 1943 – September 11, 2008) was an American fiber artist and teacher based in Alaska who specialized in a distinctive style of basketry made from dried fish skins and other natural materials found in the state.

== Biography ==
=== Early life ===
Reed was born Frances Williams in La Jolla, California, on June 12, 1943, to parents Charles and Mary Alice Williams. Reed, a competitive swimmer, graduated from La Jolla High School in 1961. She met her husband, Dick Reed, in 1961 while both were students at the University of Oregon. The couple had two children, Collin and Jocelyn.

=== Career ===
Reed graduated from University of Oregon with a Bachelor of Science degree in art education. She began teaching weaving at an art school in Eugene, Oregon, after her graduation.

She relocated to Fairbanks, Alaska, in 1969. Once in Fairbanks, Reed began teaching qiviut weaving (musk ox wool) at the University of Alaska Fairbanks. She also worked as a lecturer at Alaska Pacific University, where she taught Alaska Native arts for fifteen years. Additionally, Reed worked for the Alaska Marine Highway Elderhostel program.

Reed began working with dried fish as an art material in 1986 using dead "river kill" fish collected from the Chena River. The family moved south to Anchorage shortly afterwards when her husband, Dick Reed, an architect, was hired for a large project. Southcentral Alaska offered more numerous, diverse fish species than those found near Reed's former home in Fairbanks. This allowed her to incorporate more fish skins in her art and expand her interests.

Through her art, Reed became an expert on the use of fish skins and their uses, especially in the traditional indigenous art of Alaska, such as baskets. She extensively researched Alaskan fish skin and their uses independently. Her unique art and expertise attracted attention from throughout Alaska and the rest of the United States. This led to a number of awards and honors.

Reed's fish skin baskets and other crafts were featured in the book, Arctic Clothing, which was published by the British Museum Press. She received the Lila Wallace-Reader's Digest Artists at Giverny fellowship in 1996, which allowed her to study at the home of Claude Monet in France for three months. She also received the Rasmuson Foundation and Western States Arts Federation fellowships during her career. In 1989, Reed was adopted into the Tsimshian Killer Whale clan, which is also known as the Gispwudwada.

In 1997, Reed was commissioned by the Governor of Alaska to create the prizes given to the recipients of the Alaska Governor's Arts Awards.

Reed was awarded the Anchorage Mayor's Award for Outstanding Individual Artist by Mayor Mark Begich in 2008. Despite being ill with cancer, Reed spent four days in 2008 at the Smithsonian Institution in Washington, D.C. Reed aided Smithsonian staff and curators to restore and identify animal skins in the museum's Native Alaskan collection.

Reed was a member of The Friends of Fiber Arts International and Northwest Designer Craftsmen.

=== Death ===
Fran Reed died of cancer on September 11, 2008, at the age of 65, in Anchorage, Alaska. She is survived by her husband and children.

Reed's final scholarly paper, entitled Embellishment of the Alaska Native Gut Parka, was presented posthumously at the 11th Biennial Textile Society of America Symposium in Honolulu, Hawaii, by Audrey Armstrong. Armstrong, an Athabascan basket maker and friend of Reed, had been taught many techniques and skills by Reed.
