= Mark Guardado =

American mobster

Mark "Papa" Guardado (November 29, 1961 – September 3, 2008) was a member of the Hells Angels Motorcycle Club and president of the club's San Francisco chapter. He was also an advisor for the television show Sons of Anarchy, which follows an outlaw motorcycle club.

On February 10, 2008, Guardado allegedly beat up a man in Petaluma, California but died before he could appear in court to fight the charges. Guardado was charged with battery and Jonathan Nelson, vice-president of the Sonoma County chapter of the Hells Angels, was charged with felony battery in that incident. In March, 2010, Jonathan Nelson was acquitted of felony assault and gang charges related to the McNear's altercation by a Sonoma County jury. The jury found that the Hells Angels were not a criminal street gang under California law. Guardado was murdered in San Francisco's Mission District on September 3, 2008. He got into a fight with a man in a bar and was shot during that altercation at around 10:30 p.m. and later died at a nearby hospital. The San Francisco Police Department then issued a $5 million arrest warrant for Christopher Ablett, a member of the Mongols Motorcycle Club, in connection with the murder. Ablett turned himself in to authorities in Bartlesville, Oklahoma on October 4 of that year. He was sentenced to life without parole for Guardado's murder.

Around 3,000 Hells Angels members from all over the United States, as well as Australia, Canada, and Germany, attended Guardado's funeral, which was held in Daly City, California, on September 15.
