= Thiago da Silva (footballer, born 1983) =

Brazilian footballer (1983–2008)

- Born: Thiago Jotta da Silva; 14 February 1983; Brazil
- Died: 24 September 2008 (aged 25); Rio de Janeiro, Brazil
- Cause of death: Homicide
- Occupation: Footballer

Thiago Jotta da Silva (14 February 1983 – 24 September 2008) was a Brazilian footballer who played for Estácio de Sá (at the time of his death) and Vasco de Gama.

== Death ==
On 24 September 2008, Silva died at the Salgado Filho Hospital in the Méier area in Rio de Janeiro six days after receiving mortal wounds from a kidnapping and torture incident. Police arrested Silva's ex-girlfriend, Aline de Pádua (also written as Alyne Padula), and Padula's aunt, Márcia Pádua Viana (also written as Marcia Padula Viana), in connection with the crime. Three men, including a member of the military police, were friends of Márcia Pádua. The men shot Thiago Jotta da Silva when he tried to escape the attackers, he was 25.

== See also ==
- List of kidnappings
