= Seigo Tada =

Japanese karateka and coach

Seigo Tada 多田 正剛
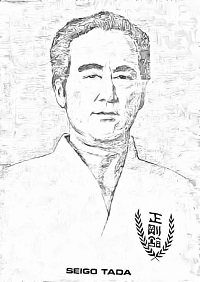
- Charcoal pencil drawing
- Born: February 18, 1922; Kyoto - Japan
- Died: September 18, 1997 (aged 75); Himeji - Hyogo (Japan)
- Style: Goju-ryu
- Teacher: Chojun Miyagi,
- Rank: Soke, Founder of Seigokan, Hanshi 10th Dan (SAJKA)

Other information
- Notable students: Atsuko Wakai, Cynthia Luster
- Website: seigokan-japan.com

Seigo Tada (多田 正剛, Kyoto, Japan, 1922–1997) (8th Dan) was the founder of Goju-Ryu Seigokan Karatedo.

== Biography ==
Tada was born on February 18, 1922, in Kyoto, Japan.

In 1937 he learned the internal Chinese martial arts (Chinese Kempo) with Ching Lou in Shanghai.

He joined the Ritsumeikan University in Kyoto and its same Karate Club. There, he studied the essence of Goju-ryu Karate-Do with Chojun Miyagi.

In 1943 he was appointed Coach of the Karate Club of the University. After graduation, he established the Nihon Karate-Do Seigokan Doshikai (SAJKA), the Nihon Karate-Do Goju-Ryu and Doshikai Nihon Seigokai in Kyoto. He led about 120 Seigokan Dojos, Associations and Karate-Do Clubs and Karate-Do University's Dojos and beyond, as Chief Instructor and President.

During the war, he was a member of the "Tokotai" Battalion with suicide identical missions to the "Kamikaze" (Divine Wind).

After the Second World War (1939–1945), he made testing for movie actor, together with Toshirō Mifune, but soon abandoned this career.

In 1952 he established the rules of competition and developed the original protector for the head, with the aim of modernizing the Karate-Do as a sport and in particular, as a future Olympic Sport.

In 1964, Seigo Tada was one of the promoters and executives of the All Japan Karate-Do Federation (JKF) in the district of Kansai, as in the Kinki District and held the lead and union of the Federations of such districts.

In order to expand Goju-Ryu Seigokan and to transform Karate as an Olympic Sport, he traveled abroad and sent instructors, creating Associations (Branches) of Seigokan in Hong Kong, Macau, Brazil, Portugal, United States, Canada, Australia, Italy, Philippines, Singapore, India and Sri Lanka.

At that time, Seigokan was the largest Association (Kai-Ha) of Goju-Ryu in Japan, with more than 200,000 members.

In 1981 he won the Medal of Athletic Merit of Hyogo Prefecture.

After his sudden death by myocardial infarction in 1997, his wife Michiko Okamoto, succeeded him as President of Seigokan All Japan Karate-Do Association (SAJKA).

== Charges ==
- Founder, Chairman and Chief Instructor of Seigokan All Japan Karate-Do Association (SAJKA).
- Member of the Executive Members Board and Instructor at Japan Karate Federation (JKF).
- Director of the Japan Karate-Do Federation (JKF).
- Head-Director of the Karate Federation of Kansai District.
- Head-Director of the Karate Federation of Kinki District.
- Head-Director, VP and Executive Chairman of the Karate Federation of Hyogo Prefecture.

== Bibliography ==
- "Sagi Ashi Dachi kamae eien nale - Seigokan Golden Book" - Limited Edition by JKS (Out of Print).
- "Yoki´s Karate Errantry in America" by Yukiaki Yoki (2001); Betty D.Greenberg Edition. 104 pages. ISBN 978-1545371978.
- "História da Seigokan em Portugal" by Eduardo Cunha Lopes (2015); Bubok Edition. 340 pages. ISBN 978-1548579487.
- "Karaté-Do Seigokan em Macau - Uma Longa História de Sucessos" - Edition by Regional Government of Macao (1991) (Reprint in Press).
