= List of Chile-related topics =

The following is an outline of topics related to the Republic of Chile.

== Chile ==
- Chile
- ISO 3166-1 alpha-2 country code for Chile: CL
- ISO 3166-1 alpha-3 country code for Chile: CHL
- ISO 3166-2:CL region codes for Chile

== Archaeological sites of Chile ==
- Easter Island
- Monte Verde

=== Easter Island ===
- Aku-Aku
- Easter Island
- Hanga Roa
- Mataveri International Airport
- Music of Easter Island
- Rapa Nui (film)
- Rapa Nui National Park
- Rapa Nui language
- Rapanui
- Williamson-Balfour Company

== Buildings and structures in Chile ==
- Bahá'í House of Worship
- Christ the Redeemer of the Andes
- Churches of Chiloé
- Costanera Center
- Cruz del Tercer Milenio
- Estación Mapocho
- Ex Congreso Nacional
- Humberstone and Santa Laura Saltpeter Works
- Casa de Isla Negra
- Morandé 80

=== Observatories in Chile ===
- Atacama Large Millimeter Array
- Atacama Pathfinder Experiment
- Atacama Submillimeter Telescope Experiment
- Birmingham Solar Oscillations Network
- Cerro Tololo Inter-American Observatory
- Cosmic Background Imager
- European Southern Observatory
- Gemini Observatory
- Giant Magellan Telescope
- La Silla Observatory
- Large Synoptic Survey Telescope
- Las Campanas Observatory
- Llano de Chajnantor Observatory
- Magellan telescopes
- Manuel Foster Observatory
- NANTEN2 Observatory
- Paranal Observatory
- SOAR telescope

=== Bridges in Chile ===
- Chacao Channel bridge

=== Cemeteries in Chile ===
- Cementerio General de Chile

=== Houses in Chile ===
- Guaraculén

=== Museums in Chile ===
- Huáscar (ship)

=== Sports venues in Chile ===
- Arena Santiago
- Estadio Víctor Jara
- Medialuna Monumental de Rancagua

==== Football venues in Chile ====
- Estadio Municipal de Calama
- Estadio Carlos Dittborn
- Estadio El Cobre
- Estadio El Teniente
- Estadio Fiscal
- Estadio Francisco Sánchez Rumoroso
- Estadio La Portada
- Estadio Las Higueras
- Estadio Monumental David Arellano
- Estadio Municipal de Concepción
- Estadio Municipal de La Florida
- Estadio Nacional de Chile
- Estadio Playa Ancha
- Estadio Regional de Antofagasta
- Estadio Regional de Chinquihue
- Estadio San Carlos de Apoquindo
- Estadio Santa Laura
- Estadio Santiago Bueras
- Estadio Sausalito

== Settlements in Chile ==
=== Cities in Chile ===
- List of cities in Chile grouped by region, also largest cities
- Ancud, Chile
- Andacollo, Chile
- Angol, Chile
- Antofagasta, Chile
- Arica, Chile
- Lo Barnechea, Chile
- Batuco, Santiago
- El Bosque, Chile
- Calama, Chile
- Caldera, Chile
- Calera, La
- Cañete, Chile
- Castro, Chile
- Cerrillos, Chile
- Cerro Navia, Chile
- Chanco, Chile
- Chañaral, Chile
- Chile Chico, Chile
- Chillán, Chile
- La Cisterna, Chile
- Colbún, Chile
- Collipulli, Chile
- Concepción, Chile
- Conchalí, Chile
- Las Condes, Chile
- Constitución, Chile
- Copiapó, Chile
- Coquimbo, Chile
- Coronel, Chile
- Coyhaique, Chile
- Curepto, Chile
- Curicó, Chile
- Dalcahue, Chile
- Empedrado, Chile
- Lo Espejo, Chile
- Estación Central
- La Florida, Chile
- Frutillar, Chile
- Gran Valparaíso, Chile
- La Granja, Chile
- Huechuraba, Chile
- Illapel, Chile
- Independencia, Chile
- Iquique, Chile
- La Serena, Chile
- Licantén, Chile
- Linares, Chile
- Longaví, Chile
- Los Andes, Chile
- Los Ángeles, Chile
- Lota, Chile
- Macul, Chile
- Maipú, Chile
- Maule, Chile
- Mejillones, Chile
- Mulchén, Chile
- Nirivilo, Chile
- Ñuñoa, Chile
- Osorno, Chile
- Ovalle, Chile
- Parral, Chile
- Pedro Aguirre Cerda, Chile
- Pelarco, Chile
- Pelluhue, Chile
- Pencahue, Chile
- Penco, Chile
- Peñalolén, Chile
- La Pintana, Chile
- Lo Prado, Chile
- Porvenir
- Providencia, Chile
- Pucón, Chile
- Pudahuel, Chile
- Puerto Aisén, Chile
- Puerto Montt, Chile
- Puerto Natales, Chile
- Puerto Varas, Chile
- Punta Arenas, Chile
- Putre, Chile
- Quellón, Chile
- Quilicura, Chile
- Quillota, Chile
- Quilpué, Chile
- Quinta Normal, Chile
- Rancagua, Chile
- Rauco, Chile
- Recoleta, Chile
- La Reina, Chile
- Renaico, Chile
- Renca, Chile
- Rengo, Chile
- Retiro, Chile
- Romeral, Chile
- Río Claro, Chile
- Río Negro, Chile
- Saavedra, Chile
- Sagrada Familia (Chile)
- San Carlos, Chile
- San Clemente, Chile
- San Fabián de Alico
- San Fernando, Chile
- San Javier, Chile
- San Joaquín
- San Miguel (municipality)
- San Rafael, Chile
- San Ramón, Chile
- Santiago (municipality)
- Santo Domingo, Chile
- Sewell, Chile
- Talca
- Talcahuano
- Temuco
- Teno
- Tocopilla
- Valdivia (city)
- Vallenar
- Valparaíso
- Vichuquén
- Vicuña, Chile
- Villa Alegre, Chile
- Villarrica, Chile
- Viña del Mar
- Vitacura
- Yerbas Buenas

==== Santiago ====
- Santiago
- Lo Barnechea
- Barrio Bellavista
- Barrio Suecia
- Battle of Santiago
- Centro Cultural Palacio de La Moneda
- Cerrillos (municipality)
- Cerro Navia
- Cerro San Cristóbal
- Cerro Santa Lucía
- Club Deportivo Palestino
- Club Deportivo Universidad Católica
- Club de Deportes Santiago Morning
- Colo-Colo
- Conchalí
- El Bosque (municipality, Chile)
- Lo Espejo
- Estación Central railway station
- Estación Central
- Estadio Monumental David Arellano
- Estadio Nacional de Chile
- Estadio San Carlos de Apoquindo
- Estadio Santa Laura
- Estadio Santiago Bueras
- Estadio Víctor Jara
- Ex Congreso Nacional
- Huechuraba
- Independencia
- La Cisterna
- La Florida, Chile
- La Granja (municipality)
- La Pintana
- Las Condes
- Lo Prado
- Macul
- Maipú (municipality)
- Mapocho River
- Ñuñoa
- O'Higgins Park
- Palacio de La Moneda
- Pedro Aguirre Cerda (municipality)
- Peñalolén
- Providencia (municipality, Chile)
- Pudahuel
- Quilicura
- Quinta Normal
- Recoleta (municipality)
- La Reina
- Renca
- San Joaquín
- San Miguel (municipality)
- San Ramón, Chile
- Sanhattan
- Santiago (municipality)
- Santiago Metro
- Santiago Metropolitan Region
- Torre Entel
- Universidad Metropolitana de Ciencias de la Educación
- Universidad Tecnológica Metropolitana
- Universidad de Chile (football club)
- Universidad de los Andes (Chile)
- University of Santiago, Chile
- Universidad Catolica (football club)
- Unión Española
- Vitacura

===== People from Santiago =====
- Ricardo Acuña
- Xavier Castellà
- Jaime Fillol
- Fernando González
- Anita Lizana
- Marcelo Ríos
- Horatio Sanz
- Teresa of Los Andes
- Andrés Zaldívar
- Iván Zamorano

== Towns in Chile ==
- Cerro Sombrero
- Colonia Dignidad
- Curanipe
- Guanaqueros
- Huara
- Lican Ray
- Parral
- Pica, Chile
- Pisco Elqui
- Puerto Edén
- Puerto Williams
- Puerto Toro
- Putagán
- San Gregorio, Chile
- San Pedro de Atacama
- Tongoy
- Villa Las Estrellas
- Villa Tehuelches

== Communications in Chile ==
- Communications in Chile
- List of people on stamps of Chile
- .cl
- Time in Chile

== Chilean culture ==
- Culture of Chile
- Chamanto
- Chilean rodeo
- Cueca
- Huaso
- List of Chilean chess champions
- Public holidays in Chile

=== Chilean art ===
==== Chilean artists ====
- Grupo Montparnasse
- Máximo Carvajal
- Felipe Barral Momberg

=== Chilean comics ===
- Condorito
- Cucalón (comic strip)

=== Chilean mythology ===
- City of the Caesars

==== Chilote mythology ====
- Caleuche
- Invunche
- Pincoya
- Trauco

==== Mapuche mythology ====
- Kalku
- Machi (Shaman)
- Nguruvilu

==== Rapa Nui mythology ====
- Hotu Matu'a
- Makemake (mythology)
- Manutara
- Moai
- Motu Nui
- Rongorongo
- Tangata manu

=== Chilean national symbols ===
- Coat of arms of Chile
- Flag of Chile
- National Anthem of Chile

=== Cinema of Chile ===
- ChilePuede
- Machuca
- Tony Manero (film)
- Pretendiendo

==== Chilean actors ====
- Antonio Prieto
- Cecilia Amenábar
- Patricio Contreras
- Cristián de la Fuente
- Christina Montt
- Leonor Varela
- Valentina Vargas

==== Chilean film directors ====
- Alejandro Amenábar
- Diego Barros
- Marco Bechis
- Juan Downey
- Alejandro Jodorowsky
- Miguel Littin
- Raoul Ruiz

==== Chilean films ====
- Kiltro
- Las películas de mi vida
- Machuca

==== Chilean screenwriters ====
- Marco Bechis
- Miguel Littin

=== Chilean cuisine ===
See also Chilean cuisine

- Cuisine of Chile
- Anticuchos
- Asado
- Cazuela
- Charquicán
- Churrasco
- Curanto
- Empanada
- Humita
- Manjar blanco
- Sopaipilla

==== Chilean wine ====
- Chilean wine
- Carmenère
- Melchor de Concha y Toro
- Concha y Toro Winery

=== Languages of Chile ===
- Ayacucho Quechua
- Huillice language
- Kawésqar language
- Mapudungun
- Selkʼnam language
- Quechua
- Rapa Nui language
- Spanish language
- Tsesungun language
- Yaghan language

==== Indigenous languages of the South American Cone ====
- Kawésqar language
- Puelche
- Saraveca
- Yaghan language

=== Chilean literature ===
- The House of the Spirits
- La Araucana
- Papelucho

==== Chilean writers ====
- Isabel Allende
- Miguel Arteche
- Sergio Badilla Castillo
- Alberto Baeza Flores
- Eduardo Barrios
- Gregorio Billikopf
- Alberto Blest Gana
- Roberto Bolaño
- María Luisa Bombal
- Roberto Castillo Sandoval
- Jaime Collyer
- Francisco Coloane
- José Donoso
- Ariel Dorfman
- Jorge Edwards
- Diamela Eltit
- Alberto Fuguet
- Jorge González von Marées
- José Toribio Medina
- Gabriela Mistral
- Hernán Neira
- Carlos Pezoa Véliz
- Gonzalo Rojas
- Carlos Ruiz-Tagle
- Luis Sepúlveda
- Miguel Serrano
- Víctor Domingo Silva
- Antonio Skármeta
- Jorge Urrutia
- Matilde Urrutia

==== Chilean songwriters ====
- Víctor Jara
- Violeta Parra
- Eduardo Parra

=== Chilean music ===
- Music of Chile
- Chilean rock
- El Derecho de Vivir en Paz (album)
- Music of Easter Island
- Nueva canción
- Piedra Roja (festival)

==== Nueva canción ====
- Nueva canción
- Basta (album)
- El Derecho de Vivir en Paz (album)
- El pueblo unido jamás será vencido
- La Población (album)
- Manifiesto (Víctor Jara album)
- Pongo En Tus Manos Abiertas (album)
- Víctor Jara (album)

===== Nueva canción musicians =====
- Eduardo Alquinta
- Eduardo Carrasco
- Eduardo Gatti
- Illapu
- Inti-Illimani
- Víctor Jara
- Los Jaivas
- Guillermo "Willy" Oddó
- Sergio Ortega
- Rodolfo Parada
- Violeta Parra
- Quilapayún

==== Chilean musicians ====
- Pablo Salvador Naranjo-Golborne

===== Chilean composers =====
- Luis Advis
- Gustavo Becerra-Schmidt
- Alfonso Leng
- Juan Orrego-Salas
- Sergio Ortega
- Jorge Peña Hen
- Jorge Urrutia

===== Chilean guitarists =====
- Oscar Lopez
- Margot Loyola
- Cristián Alvear Montecino

===== Chilean pianists =====
Chilean classical pianists

- Claudio Arrau
- Alberto Guerrero

===== Chilean singers =====
- German Casas
- Claudio Narea

Chilean classical singers

- Tito Beltrán
- Ramón Vinay
- Clorinda Corradi

Chilean folk singers

- Eduardo Alquinta
- Eduardo Carrasco
- Eduardo Gatti
- Víctor Jara
- Margot Loyola
- Mario Mutis
- Guillermo "Willy" Oddó
- Rodolfo Parada
- Parra family
- Claudio Parra
- Eduardo Parra
- Gabriel Parra
- Violeta Parra

Chilean popular singers

- Tom Araya
- Daniela Castillo
- Nicole
- Beto Cuevas
- Lucho Gatica
- Colombina Parra
- Javiera Parra
- Alejandro Silva (musician)

==== Chilean musical groups ====
- Chilean rock
- Gondwana (Chilean band)
- Hetroertzen
- Illapu
- Inti-Illimani
- Kudai
- La Ley (band)
- Lesbos in love
- Los Jaivas
- Los Miserables (band)
- Los Prisioneros
- Los Tetas
- Los Tres
- Lucybell
- Pyros
- Quilapayún
- Sol y Lluvia
- Vigilante (band)

== Economy of Chile ==
- Economy of Chile
- Chile under Pinochet
- Economic history of Chile
- Chilean escudo
- Miracle of Chile
- Chilean nationalization of copper
- Chilean peso
- Project Cybersyn
- Santiago Stock Exchange
- Trans-Pacific Strategic Economic Partnership
- US-Chile Free Trade Agreement
- Unidad de Fomento

=== Companies of Chile ===
- List of Chilean companies
- Antofagasta plc
- Codelco
- Copec
- Distribución y Servicio
- Entel
- Falabella
- LAN Airlines
- El Mercurio
- Sky Airline
- VTR Globalcom
- Vigatec (Chile)
- Williamson-Balfour Company

=== Mines in Chile ===
- Chuquicamata
- Escondida
- Radomiro Tomic (mine)
- El Teniente
- El Toqui mine

=== Trade unions of Chile ===
- Central Autónoma de Trabajadores
- Workers' United Center of Chile

== Education in Chile ==
- List of universities in Chile
- Chile Student Strike of 2006
- Education in Chile
- 2006 student protests in Chile
- 2011 student protests in Chile

=== Chilean educators ===
==== Chilean academics ====
- Gabriela Mistral

==== Chilean schoolteachers ====
- Gabriela Mistral

=== Schools in Chile ===
- Instituto Nacional
- Santiago College
- Nido de Aguilas
- The Mayflower School
- Saint George's College, Santiago
- Colegio de Nuestra Senora de Andacollo (Santiago)

=== Universities in Chile ===
- Central University of Chile
- Universidad Adolfo Ibáñez
- Universidad de Antofagasta
- Universidad de Chile (university)
- Universidad de Concepción
- Universidad Gabriela Mistral
- Universidad de La Frontera
- Universidad de La Serena
- Universidad de las Américas (Chile)
- Universidad de Los Lagos
- Universidad de Playa Ancha de Ciencias de la Educación
- Pontifical Catholic University of Chile
- Universidad San Sebastián
- University of Santiago, Chile
- Template:Chilean Traditional Universities
- Universidad Católica de Temuco
- Universidad Alberto Hurtado
- Universidad Arturo Prat
- Universidad Austral de Chile
- Universidad Católica de la Santísima Concepción
- Universidad Católica del Maule
- Universidad Católica del Norte
- Universidad Diego Portales
- Universidad Metropolitana de Ciencias de la Educación
- Universidad Tecnológica Metropolitana
- Universidad Tecnológica de Chile
- Universidad Técnica Federico Santa María
- Universidad de Artes, Ciencias y Comunicación
- Universidad de Atacama
- Universidad de Magallanes
- Universidad de Talca
- Universidad de Tarapacá
- Universidad de Valparaíso
- Universidad de los Andes (Chile)
- Universidad del Bío-Bío
- Universidad Técnica Federico Santa María
- Pontifical Catholic University of Valparaíso

== Environment of Chile ==
=== Biota of Chile ===
==== Fauna of Chile ====
- Alpaca
- Andean cat
- Andean condor
- Andean tinamou
- Black-necked swan
- Chilean dolphin
- Chilean flamingo
- Chilean horse
- Coscoroba swan
- Culpeo
- Darwin's fox
- Common degu
- Elegant crested tinamou
- Emperor penguin
- Flying steamer duck
- Geoffroy's cat
- Green-backed firecrown
- Guanaco
- Haig's tuco-tuco
- Huemul (zoology)
- Humboldt penguin
- James's flamingo
- Kelp goose
- King penguin
- Kodkod
- Long-nosed shrew opossum
- Macaroni penguin
- Magellanic penguin
- Monito del monte
- Pampas cat
- Pampas fox
- Pudú
- Puna tinamou
- Sechura fox
- Short-eared dog
- South American sea lion
- South American gray fox
- Torrent duck
- Vampire bat
- Vicuña

==== Flora of Chile ====
- Aextoxicon
- Antarctic flora
- Araucaria
- Araucaria araucana
- Austrocedrus
- Berberis buxifolia
- Berberis darwinii
- Berberis negeriana
- Boldo
- Chilean Matorral
- Coihue
- Copihue
- Drimys
- Eucryphia
- Fitzroya
- Francoaceae
- Gomortega
- Juan Fernández Islands
- Lardizabala
- Lenga beech
- Luma apiculata
- Luma chequen
- Magellanic subpolar forests
- Mitraria
- Myrceugenia
- Nolana
- Nothofagus
- Nothofagus antarctica
- Pilgerodendron
- Podocarpus nubigenus
- Prumnopitys andina
- Saxegothaea
- Soap bark tree
- Solanum crispum
- Tetragonia
- Ugni
- Valdivian temperate rain forests
- Yareta

=== Conservation in Chile ===
==== World Heritage Sites in Chile ====
- Churches of Chiloé
- Easter Island
- Humberstone and Santa Laura Saltpeter Works
- Sewell, Chile
- Valparaíso

=== Ecoregions in Chile ===
- Atacama
- Chilean Matorral
- Desventuradas Islands
- Juan Fernández Islands
- Magellanic subpolar forests
- Valdivian temperate rain forests

== Geography of Chile ==
- Geography of Chile
- Altiplano
- Azapa Valley
- Chilean Central Valley
- Darwin Sound
- El Tatio
- Extreme points of Chile
- Guanaqueros
- Gulf of Ancud
- Gulf of Corcovado
- Huinay
- ISO 3166-2:CL
- Intermediate Depression
- La Portada
- Lauca
- List of Biosphere Reserves in Chile
- Los Ruiles
- Peru–Chile Trench
- Puerto del Hambre
- Pumalín Park
- Tongoy, Chile
- Valdivian Coastal Range

=== Craters of Chile ===
- Monturaqui crater

=== Deserts of Chile ===
- Atacama

=== Glaciers of Chile ===
- Brüggen Glacier
- Northern Patagonian Ice Field
- San Quintín Glacier
- San Rafael Glacier
- Southern Patagonian Ice Field

=== Headlands of Chile ===
- False Cape Horn
- Cape Froward
- Cape Horn

=== Islands of Chile ===
- Isla Chañaral
- Chiloé Island
- Chonos Archipelago
- Dawson Island
- Desventuradas Islands
- Diego Ramírez Islands
- Easter Island
- Guafo Island
- Guayaneco Archipelago
- Hermite Islands
- Hoste (island)
- Ildefonso Islands
- Mocha (island)
- Isla Navarino
- Picton, Lennox and Nueva
- Riesco Island
- Sala y Gómez
- Santa Inés
- Tierra del Fuego
- Isla Grande de Tierra del Fuego
- Wellington Island

==== Chiloé Island ====
- Chiloé Island
- Chiloé Province

==== Juan Fernández Islands ====
- Juan Fernández Islands
- Alejandro Selkirk Island
- Robinson Crusoe Island
- Santa Clara (Juan Fernández Islands)

=== Lakes of Chile ===
- Lake Chungará
- Fagnano Lake
- Buenos Aires/General Carrera Lake
- Lake Llanquihue
- O'Higgins/San Martín Lake
- Lake Villarrica

=== Mountains of Chile ===
- Acotango
- Cerro Azul (Chile volcano)
- Cerro Bayo
- Cerro Chaltén
- Copahue
- Cordillera de Talinay
- Cordillera del Paine
- Cordón del Azufre
- Mount Darwin (Andes)
- Cerro Escorial
- Falso Azufre
- Mount Hudson
- Irruputuncu
- Sierra Nevada de Lagunas Bravas
- Lanin
- Lascar Volcano
- Lastarria
- Lazufre
- Lautaro (volcano)
- Licancabur
- Llullaillaco
- Maipo (volcano)
- Marmolejo
- Cerro Minchincha
- Sierra Nevada (stratovolcano)
- Nevado de Longaví
- Ojos del Salado
- Olca
- Volcán Osorno
- Cerro Paranal
- Parinacota Volcano
- Paruma
- Pomerape
- Robledo (volcano)
- Monte San Valentin
- Socompa
- Cerro Torre
- Tronador
- Tupungato
- Villarrica (volcano)

=== National parks of Chile ===
- List of national parks of Chile
- Alberto de Agostini National Park
- Alerce Andino National Park
- Archipiélago de Juan Fernández National Park
- Bernardo O'Higgins National Park
- Bosque de Fray Jorge National Park
- Cabo de Hornos National Park
- Conguillío National Park
- Cordillera del Paine
- Isla Magdalena National Park
- La Campana National Park
- Laguna San Rafael National Park
- Lauca National Park
- Pali-Aike National Park
- Queulat National Park
- Rapa Nui National Park
- Vicente Pérez Rosales National Park

=== Patagonia ===
- Patagonia
- City of the Caesars
- Lake Huechulafquen
- Patagonian Ice Sheet
- In Patagonia
- Kingdom of Araucania and Patagonia
- Patagon
- Tehuelche people

=== Peninsulas of Chile ===
- Arauco Peninsula
- Brunswick Peninsula
- Hardy Peninsula
- Mejillones Peninsula
- Taitao Peninsula

=== Rivers of Chile ===
- Achibueno
- Aconcagua River
- Ancoa
- Baker River (Chile)
- Bío-Bío River
- Cauquenes river
- Cautín River
- Elqui River
- Futaleufú River
- Itata River
- Laja River (Chile)
- Loa River
- Loncomilla River
- Longaví River
- Mapocho River
- Mataquito River
- Maule river
- Pascua River
- Perquilauquén
- Puelo River
- River Melado
- River Purapel
- River Putagán
- Valdivia River

=== Ski areas and resorts in Chile ===
- Antillanca
- Coyhaique
- Valle Nevado
- Pucón
- Termas de Chillán

=== Straits of Chile ===
- Beagle Channel
- Chacao Channel
- Darwin Sound
- Drake Passage
- Moraleda Channel
- Strait of Magellan

=== Chile geography stubs ===
- Achibueno
- Aconcagua River
- Alameda del Libertador Bernardo O'Higgins
- Alberto de Agostini National Park
- Alto Hospicio
- Ancoa
- Ancud
- Andacollo
- Angol
- Antillanca
- Antofagasta Province
- Araucanía Region
- Arauco Province
- Archipiélago de Juan Fernández National Park
- Arica Province
- Arica and Parinacota Region
- Atacama Department
- Atacama Region
- Aisén Fjord
- Aisén Region
- Baker River (Chile)
- Barrio Suecia
- Batuco, Santiago
- Bernardo O'Higgins National Park
- Biobío Province
- Brunswick Peninsula
- Brüggen Glacier
- Buenos Aires/General Carrera Lake
- Bío-Bío Region
- Bío-Bío River
- Cabo de Hornos Biosphere Reserve
- Cabo de Hornos National Park
- Calama, Chile
- Caldera, Chile
- Cape Froward
- Casa de Isla Negra
- Castro, Chile
- Cauquenes
- Cauquenes Province
- Cauquenes river
- Cautín Province
- Cautín River
- Cañete
- Cementerio General de Chile
- Cerrillos (municipality)
- Cerro Azul (Chile volcano)
- Cerro Bayo
- Cerro Escorial
- Cerro Navia
- Cerro Paranal
- Cerro San Cristóbal
- Cerro Torre
- Chacao Channel
- Chañaral
- Chile Chico
- Chilean Sea
- Chiloé Province
- Chimbarongo
- Chonos Archipelago
- Churches of Chiloé
- Cochrane, Chile
- Colchagua Province
- Colina, Chile
- Combarbala
- Conchalí
- Constitución, Chile
- Copahue
- Copiapó
- Coquimbo
- Coquimbo Region
- Cordillera Province, Chile
- Cordillera de Talinay
- Cordón del Azufre
- Coronel, Chile
- Curepto
- Curicó Province
- Dalcahue
- Dawson Island
- El Bosque (municipality, Chile)
- El Monte (Chile)
- Elqui River
- Empedrado, Talca
- Escondida
- Estación Central
- Fagnano Lake
- False Cape Horn
- Falso Azufre
- Frutillar
- Futaleufú River
- Gran Valparaíso, Chile
- Guafo Island
- Guanaqueros
- Guayaneco Archipelago
- Gulf of Ancud
- Gulf of Corcovado
- Hanga Roa
- Hardy Peninsula
- Hermite Islands
- Hoste (island)
- Huara
- Huechuraba
- Illapel
- Independencia (municipality, Chile)
- Iquique
- Iquique Province
- Isla Chañaral
- Isla Grande de Tierra del Fuego
- Itata River
- La Campana National Park
- La Campana-Peñuelas
- La Cisterna
- La Dehesa
- La Florida, Chile
- La Granja (municipality)
- La Pintana
- La Reina
- Laguna San Rafael National Park
- Laguna Verde, Chile
- Laja Falls
- Laja River (Chile)
- Lake Ballivián
- Lake Chungará
- Lake Llanquihue
- Lake Villarrica
- Lampa, Chile
- Lanin
- Las Condes
- Lascar Volcano
- Lastarria
- Lauca
- Lauca National Park
- Lautaro (volcano)
- Lican Ray, Chile
- Licancabur
- Licantén
- Linares Province
- Llanquihue Province
- Lo Barnechea
- Lo Espejo
- Lo Prado
- Loncomilla River
- Longaví
- Longaví River
- Los Andes, Chile
- Los Lagos Region
- Los Ruiles
- Los Vilos
- Los Ángeles
- Lota, Chile
- Macul
- Maipo (volcano)
- Maipo Province
- Maipú (municipality)
- Malleco Province
- Mapocho River
- Marmolejo
- Mataquito River
- Maule (Chile)
- Maule river
- Mejillones
- Mocha (island)
- Monte San Valentin
- Monte Verde
- Monturaqui crater
- Moraleda Channel
- Motu Nui
- Mulchén
- Northern Patagonian Ice Field
- O'Higgins Region
- O'Higgins/San Martín Lake
- Ojos del Salado
- Osorno Province
- Osorno, Chile
- Ovalle, Chile
- Palena Province
- Pali-Aike National Park
- Pali-Aike Volcanic Field
- Paranal Mountain
- Parinacota, Chile
- Parinacota Province
- Parral, Chile
- Paso Libertadores
- Pedro Aguirre Cerda (municipality)
- Pelarco
- Pencahue
- Penco
- Perquilauquén
- Peru–Chile Trench
- Peñalolen
- Peñalolén
- Pica, Chile
- Pichidangui
- Picton, Lennox and Nueva
- Pisagua, Chile
- Pisco Elqui, Chile
- Pomerape
- Pozo Almonte
- Providencia (municipality, Chile)
- Province of Los Andes, Chile

=== Subdivisions of Chile ===
- Electoral division of Chile
- Municipalities of Chile
- Provinces of Chile
- Regions of Chile

=== Tierra del Fuego ===
- Tierra del Fuego
- Alacalufe people
- Beagle Channel
- Darwin Sound
- Fagnano Lake
- Isla Grande de Tierra del Fuego
- Isla Navarino
- Kawésqar language
- Mount Darwin (Andes)
- Saraveca language
- Selkʼnam
- Tierra del Fuego Province, Chile
- Yaghan language

==== Cities and towns in Tierra del Fuego ====
- Isla Navarino
- Porvenir, Chile
- Puerto Toro
- Puerto Williams

=== Volcanoes of Chile ===
- Acotango
- Cerro Azul (Chile volcano)
- Cerro Bayo
- Calbuco (volcano)
- Chaiten
- Copahue
- Cordón del Azufre
- Cerro Escorial
- Falso Azufre
- Hornopirén
- Mount Hudson
- Irruputuncu
- Sierra Nevada de Lagunas Bravas
- Lanin
- Lascar Volcano
- Lastarria
- Lautaro (volcano)
- Licancabur
- Llullaillaco
- Maipo (volcano)
- Cerro Minchincha
- Sierra Nevada (stratovolcano)
- Nevados de Payachata
- Nevados de Quimsachata
- Ojos del Salado
- Olca
- Volcán Osorno
- Pali-Aike Volcanic Field
- Parinacota Volcano
- Paruma
- Pomerape
- Robledo (volcano)
- Socompa
- Villarrica (volcano)
- Wallatiri
- Yaté

=== Waterfalls of Chile ===
- Laja Falls

== Government of Chile ==
- Carabineros de Chile
- Chamber of Deputies of Chile
- Constitution of Chile
- Ministry of Foreign Affairs of Chile
- Government Junta of Chile (1973)
- National Congress of Chile
- National Women's Service
- Royal Audiencia of Concepción
- Royal Audiencia of Santiago
- Ministry General Secretariat of Government
- Senate of Chile
- Supreme Court of Chile

=== Foreign relations of Chile ===
- List of Ambassadors from New Zealand to Chile
- Beagle conflict
- Papal mediation in the Beagle conflict
- Beagle Channel Arbitration
- Direct negotiations between Chile and Argentina in 1977-78
- Papal mediation in the Beagle conflict
- Treaty of Peace and Friendship of 1984 between Chile and Argentina
- Beagle Channel cartography since 1881

==== Chilean diplomats ====
- Jorge Edwards
- Gabriela Mistral
- Pablo Neruda

=== Official residences in Chile ===
- Palacio de La Moneda

== Health in Chile ==
- List of hospitals in Chile

== History of Chile ==
- History of Chile
- Alejandrina Cox incident
- Alessandri family
- Allende stamps
- Alto de la Alianza
- Antonio Samoré
- Arauco War
- Army of the Andes
- Slit Throats Case
- Burnt Alive Case
- Captaincy General of Chile
- Caravan of Death
- Carrera family
- Chicago Boys
- Chile under Allende
- Chile under Pinochet
- 1891 Chilean Civil War
- Chilean Revolution of 1829
- Chilean coup of 1973
- Chilean political scandals
- City of the Caesars
- Colonia Dignidad
- Operation Condor
- Covadonga (ship)
- Crossing of the Andes
- DINA
- Economic history of Chile
- Erasmo Escala
- Esmeralda (BE-43)
- Pedro Espinoza Bravo
- Estadio Nacional de Chile
- Estadio Víctor Jara
- Forced disappearance
- Frei family
- 1992 Galvarino
- List of Government Juntas of Chile
- Charles Horman
- Huaso (horse)
- Juntas de Abastecimientos y Precios
- Kingdom of Araucania and Patagonia
- Liberal-Conservative Fusion (Chile)
- Maitland Plan
- Mapuche
- Massacre of Seguro Obrero
- Miracle of Chile
- Missing (1982 film)
- Montt family
- National Party (Chile)
- Chilean nationalization of copper
- Nueva Extremadura
- Operation Colombo
- President of Chile
- Project Cybersyn
- Project FUBELT
- Rettig Report
- Royal Governor of Chile
- Santiago meteorite
- Paul Schäfer
- Schneider Doctrine
- Scorpion scandal
- Inés Suárez
- Tanquetazo
- Timeline of Chilean history
- Operation TOUCAN (KGB)
- Michael Townley
- Pedro de Valdivia
- Valech Report
- Valparaiso bombardment
- Villa Grimaldi

=== Elections in Chile ===
- Elections in Chile
- Chilean National Plebiscite, 1980
- 2005 Chilean parliamentary election
- 1826 Chilean presidential election
- 1827 Chilean presidential election
- 1829 Chilean presidential election
- 1831 Chilean presidential election
- 1836 Chilean presidential election
- 1841 Chilean presidential election
- 1846 Chilean presidential election
- 1851 Chilean presidential election
- 1856 Chilean presidential election
- 1861 Chilean presidential election
- 1866 Chilean presidential election
- 1871 Chilean presidential election
- 1876 Chilean presidential election
- 1881 Chilean presidential election
- 1886 Chilean presidential election
- July 1891 Chilean presidential election
- October 1891 Chilean presidential election
- 1896 Chilean presidential election
- 1901 Chilean presidential election
- 1906 Chilean presidential election
- 1920 Chilean presidential election
- 1925 Chilean presidential election
- 1927 Chilean presidential election
- 1931 Chilean presidential election
- 1932 Chilean presidential election
- 1938 Chilean presidential election
- 1942 Chilean presidential election
- 1946 Chilean presidential election
- 1952 Chilean presidential election
- 1958 Chilean presidential election
- 1964 Chilean presidential election
- 1970 Chilean presidential election
- 1989 Chilean presidential election
- 1993 Chilean presidential election
- 1999–2000 Chilean presidential election
- 2005–06 Chilean presidential election
- 2009–10 Chilean presidential election

=== Wars of Chile ===
- Arauco War
- War of the Confederation
- 1891 Chilean Civil War
- Chincha Islands War
- Chilean Independence
- War of the Pacific

==== War of the Pacific ====
- War of the Pacific
- Antofagasta Region
- Arica, Chile
- Atacama border dispute
- BAP Atahualpa
- Biblioteca Nacional del Perú
- Covadonga (ship)
- Ferrocarril de Antofagasta a Bolivia
- Huáscar (ship)
- BAP Manco Cápac
- Tacna
- Tacna-Arica compromise
- Tarapacá Region
- Toro Submarino
- Treaty of Ancón
- USS Lackawanna (1862)

===== Battles of the War of the Pacific =====
- Battle of Arica
- Bombardment of Callao
- Battle of Huamachuco
- Battle of Pisagua
- Battle of San Francisco
- Battle of Tarapacá
- Battle of Topáter

Naval battles of the War of the Pacific

- Battle of Angamos
- Battle of Chipana
- Battle of Iquique
- Battle of Punta Gruesa

===== War of the Pacific people =====
- Eduardo Abaroa
- Francisco Bolognesi
- Manuel Baquedano
- Alberto Blest Gana
- Mariano Bustamante
- Ladislao Cabrera
- Andrés Avelino Cáceres
- Narciso Campero
- Ignacio Carrera Pinto
- Melitón Carvajal
- Hilarión Daza
- Abel-Nicolas Bergasse du Petit-Thouars
- Erasmo Escala
- Miguel Grau Seminario
- Pedro Lagos
- Juan José Latorre
- Patricio Lynch
- Lizardo Montero Flores
- Nicolás de Piérola
- Aníbal Pinto
- Mariano Ignacio Prado
- Arturo Prat
- Roque Sáenz Peña
- Domingo Santa María
- Robert Souper
- Alfonso Ugarte
- Juan Williams Rebolledo

==== Battles of Chile ====
- Battle of Arica
- Bombardment of Callao
- First Battle of Cancha Rayada
- Second Battle of Cancha Rayada
- Battle of Chacabuco
- Disaster of Curalaba
- Battle of Huamachuco
- Battle of Maipú
- Battle of the Maule
- Battle of Pisagua
- Disaster of Rancagua
- Battle of San Francisco
- Battle of Tarapacá
- Battle of Topáter
- Battle of Tucapel
- Battle of Yungay

===== Battles of the Chilean War of Independence =====
- First Battle of Cancha Rayada
- Second Battle of Cancha Rayada
- Battle of Chacabuco
- Battle of Maipú
- Disaster of Rancagua

===== Battles of the War of the Confederation =====
- Battle of Yungay

===== Battles of the Arauco War =====
- Disaster of Curalaba
- Battle of Tucapel

===== Naval battles of Chile =====
- Battle of Papudo

Naval battles of the Chincha Islands War

- Battle of Abtao
- Battle of Callao
- Battle of Papudo

==== War of the Confederation ====
- War of the Confederation
- Republic of North Peru
- Republic of South Peru
- Peru-Bolivian Confederation

===== War of the Confederation people =====
- José Ballivián
- Manuel Blanco Encalada
- Manuel Bulnes
- Ramón Castilla
- Agustín Gamarra
- Luis José de Orbegoso
- Candelaria Perez
- Diego Portales
- José Joaquín Prieto
- José de la Riva Agüero
- Andrés de Santa Cruz
- Robert Winthrop Simpson

==== War of Chilean independence ====
- Chilean Independence
- The Road to Maipo

===== Chilean War of Independence people =====
- Javiera Carrera
- José Miguel Carrera
- Luis Carrera
- Thomas Cochrane, 10th Earl of Dundonald
- Ramón Freire
- Francisco de la Lastra
- Juan Mackenna
- Casimiro Marcó del Pont
- Rafael Maroto/Translation
- Juan Martinez de Rozas
- Bernardo O'Higgins
- Mariano Osorio
- Antonio Pareja
- Manuel Rodríguez
- José de San Martín
- Mateo de Toro y Zambrano

==== Chincha Islands War ====
- Covadonga (ship)
- Valparaiso bombardment

===== Chincha Islands War people =====
- Manuel Blanco Encalada
- Pedro Diez Canseco
- Mariano Melgarejo
- Casto Méndez Núñez
- Lizardo Montero Flores
- Leopoldo O'Donnell, 1st Duke of Tetuan
- Juan Manuel Pareja
- José Joaquín Pérez
- Juan Antonio Pezet
- Mariano Ignacio Prado
- Ramón María Narváez y Campos, 1st Duke of Valencia
- Manuel Ignacio de Vivanco
- Juan Williams Rebolledo

==== Arauco War ====
- Arauco War

===== Arauco War people =====
- Alonso de Ercilla y Zúñiga
- García Hurtado de Mendoza, Marquis of Cañete
- Lautaro (toqui)
- Pedro de Valdivia

=== Operation Condor ===
- Operation Condor
- Alianza Americana Anticomunista
- Alianza Anticomunista Argentina
- Martín Almada
- Augusto Pinochet's arrest and trial
- Batallón de Inteligencia 601
- Orlando Bosch
- Caravan of Death
- Colonia Dignidad
- Coordination of United Revolutionary Organizations
- DINA
- Stefano Delle Chiaie
- John Dinges
- Dirección de los Servicios de Inteligencia y Prevención
- Pedro Espinoza Bravo
- Forced disappearance
- Eduardo Frei Montalva
- Juan Guzmán Tapia
- Henry Kissinger
- Ed Koch
- Peter Kornbluh
- Saul Landau
- Bernardo Leighton
- Orlando Letelier
- José López Rega
- Kenneth Maxwell
- Montoneros
- Operation Colombo
- Operation TOUCAN (KGB)
- Augusto Pinochet
- Luis Posada Carriles
- Carlos Prats
- Otto Reich
- Rettig Report
- Virgilio Paz Romero
- SISMI
- Paul Schäfer
- Strategy of tension
- Alfredo Stroessner
- Terror archives
- Juan José Torres
- Michael Townley
- Valech Report
- Cyrus Vance
- Jorge Rafael Videla
- Villa Grimaldi
- Western Hemisphere Institute for Security Cooperation
- Robert White (ambassador)

=== History of the foreign relations of Chile ===
- ABC Powers
- Treaty of Peace and Friendship of 1984 between Chile and Argentina
- Atacama border dispute
- Augusto Pinochet's arrest and trial
- Baltimore Crisis
- Beagle conflict
- Chilean nationalization of copper
- Foreign relations of Chile
- Joel Roberts Poinsett
- Tacna-Arica compromise
- Treaty of Ancón
- United States intervention in Chile

=== Colonial Chile ===
- Francisco de Aguirre (conquistador)
- Diego de Almagro
- Lorenzo de Arrau
- Caupolican
- Colocolo (tribal chief)
- Catalina de Erauso
- Alonso de Ercilla y Zúñiga
- Alonso García de Ramón
- García Hurtado de Mendoza, 5th Marquis of Cañete
- Lautaro (toqui)
- Francisco López de Zúñiga
- Francisco Maldonado da Silva
- Luis Merlo de la Fuente
- Michimalonco
- Juan Ignacio Molina
- Ambrosio O'Higgins, Marquis of Osorno
- Domingo Ortiz de Rosas
- Mariano Osorio
- Rodrigo de Quiroga
- Alonso de Ribera
- Martín Ruiz de Gamboa
- Inés Suárez
- Pedro de Valdivia
- Francisco de Villagra
- Pedro de Villagra

=== Maps of the history of Chile ===
- Maps of Chile

== Chilean law ==
- Gay rights in Chile

== Chile-related lists ==
- List of cities in Chile
- List of Chilean Flags
- List of Chilean freeways
- List of hospitals in Chile
- List of ecoregions in Chile
- List of Chilean magazines
- List of national parks of Chile
- List of Chilean newspapers
- List of political parties in Chile
- List of people on stamps of Chile
- Timeline of Chilean history
- List of Government Juntas of Chile

== Chilean media ==
- .cl Internet country code top-level domain for Chile
- Informe Especial
- List of Chilean magazines
- List of Chilean newspapers
- Sábado Gigante

=== Newspapers published in Chile ===
- List of Chilean newspapers
- The Clinic
- La Cuarta
- El Siglo (Chile)
- Fortín Mapocho
- El Mercurio
- La Prensa de Curicó
- La Segunda
- La Tercera
- Las Últimas Noticias

=== Radio stations in Chile ===
- Radio Cooperativa

=== Television stations in Chile ===
- List of Chilean television channels
- Canal del Fútbol (Chile)
- CDtv
- Canal 13 (Chile)
- Chilevisión
- Etc...TV
- Óptima Televisión
- Red Televisiva Megavisión
- Compañía Chilena de Televisión
- TV Chile
- TV Senado
- TVN (Chile)
- TVU
- UCV TV
- Telecanal
- Via X
- Zona Latina

== Military of Chile ==
- Military of Chile
- Chilean Air Force
- Chilean Army
- Carabineros de Chile
- Halcones
- Chilean Navy
- Unidad Anti-Terrorista

=== Chilean military personnel ===
==== Chilean military officers ====
- Ignacio Carrera Pinto
- Luis Carrera
- Pedro Espinoza Bravo
- Dagoberto Godoy
- Alberto Larraguibel
- Francisco de la Lastra
- Juan Mackenna
- Arturo Prat
- Manuel Rodríguez
- Robert Souper
- Roberto Souper
- José Antonio Vidaurre
- Klaus von Storch

==== Chilean generals ====
- Luis Altamirano
- Alberto Bachelet
- Manuel Baquedano
- Bartolomé Blanche
- Manuel Bulnes
- Julio Canessa
- José Miguel Carrera
- Juan Emilio Cheyre
- Manuel Contreras
- Erasmo Escala
- Ramón Freire
- Marmaduque Grove
- Carlos Ibáñez del Campo
- Miguel Krasnoff
- Pedro Lagos
- Gustavo Leigh
- Fernando Matthei
- César Mendoza
- Bernardo O'Higgins
- Guillermo Pickering
- Augusto Pinochet
- Francisco Antonio Pinto
- Carlos Prats
- José Joaquín Prieto
- René Schneider
- Rodolfo Stange
- Camilo Valenzuela
- Roberto Viaux

==== Chilean admirals ====
- Manuel Blanco Encalada
- Juan José Latorre
- Patricio Lynch
- José Toribio Merino
- Raúl Montero
- Jorge Montt
- Francisco Nef
- Robert Winthrop Simpson
- Juan Williams Rebolledo

==== Chilean military enlisted personnel ====
- Candelaria Perez

=== Military equipment of Chile ===
==== Chilean military aircraft ====
===== Chilean military aircraft 1990-1999 =====
Chilean fighter aircraft 1990–1999

- ENAER Pantera

==== Naval ships of Chile ====
- Almirante Condell 3
- Almirante Lynch 3
- USS Charles J. Badger (DD-657)
- Covadonga (ship)
- Huáscar (ship)
- Chilean destroyer Ministro Portales
- O'Higgins (frigate)
- USS Spot (SS-413)
- USS Springer (SS-414)

===== World War I naval ships of Chile =====
World War I destroyers of Chile

- Almirante Condell
- Almirante Lynch

===== World War II naval ships of Chile =====
World War II battleships of Chile

- Chilean battleship Almirante Latorre

World War II destroyers of Chile

- Chilean destroyer Aldea (1928)
- Almirante Condell
- Almirante Lynch
- Serrano class destroyer

===== Cold War naval ships of Chile =====
Cold War battleships of Chile

- Chilean battleship Almirante Latorre

===== Battleships of Chile =====
- Chilean battleship Almirante Latorre

===== Cruisers of Chile =====
- USS Brooklyn (CL-40)
- HSwMS Göta Lejon
- USS Nashville (CL-43)

===== Destroyers of Chile =====
- HMS Antrim (D18)
- USS Charles S. Sperry (DD-697)
- HMS Glamorgan (D19)
- Chilean destroyer Ministro Portales
- USS Rooks (DD-804)
- USS Wadleigh (DD-689)

== Chilean people ==
- Clarence Acuña
- Luis Advis
- Carolina Aguilera
- Memo Aguirre
- Pedro Aguirre Cerda
- Marlene Ahrens
- Arturo Alessandri
- Jorge Alessandri
- Isabel Allende Bussi
- Andrés Pascal Allende
- Isabel Allende
- Salvador Allende
- Clodomiro Almeyda
- Eduardo Alquinta
- Carlos Altamirano
- Luis Altamirano
- Cristián Andrés Álvarez Valenzuela
- Anacleto Angelini
- Tom Araya
- Claudio Arrau
- Lorenzo de Arrau
- Alberto Bachelet
- Michelle Bachelet
- Sergio Badilla Castillo
- Alberto Baeza Flores
- José Manuel Balmaceda
- Manuel Baquedano
- Rodrigo Barrera
- Claudio Barrientos
- Eduardo Barrios
- Diego Barros Arana
- Ramón Barros Luco
- Diego Barros
- Gustavo Becerra-Schmidt
- Marco Bechis
- Andrés Bello
- Tito Beltrán
- Gregorio Billikopf
- Bartolomé Blanche
- Manuel Blanco Encalada
- Roberto Bolaño
- Cecilia Bolocco
- María Luisa Bombal
- Erik Bongcam-Rudloff
- Manuel Bulnes
- Claudio Bunster
- Carlos Camus
- Julio Canessa
- Eduardo Carrasco
- Ignacio Carrera Pinto
- Javiera Carrera
- José Miguel Carrera
- Luis Carrera
- Máximo Carvajal
- Daniela Castillo
- Roberto Castillo Sandoval
- Carlos Catasse
- Caupolican
- Juan Emilio Cheyre
- Elicura Chihuailaf
- Abdón Cifuentes
- Francisco Coloane
- Colocolo (tribal chief)
- Manuel Contreras
- Patricio Contreras
- Luis Corvalán
- Carlos Dávila
- Paul Delano
- Patricia Demick
- Juan Downey
- Luisa Durán
- Jorge Edwards
- Francisco Antonio Encina
- Miguel Enríquez Espinosa
- Francisco Javier Errázuriz Ossa
- Eugenia Errázuriz
- Federico Errázuriz Zañartu
- Fernando Errázuriz Aldunate
- Francisco Javier Errázuriz Talavera
- Alejandro Escalona
- Jéssica Eterovic
- Agustín Eyzaguirre
- Elías Figueroa
- Emiliano Figueroa Larraín
- Fernando Flores
- Don Francisco (television host)
- Eduardo Frei Montalva
- Eduardo Frei Ruiz-Tagle
- Cristián de la Fuente
- Alberto Fuguet
- Lucho Gatica
- Eduardo Gatti
- Hans Gildemeister
- Arturo Godoy
- Dagoberto Godoy
- Eric Goles
- Gabriel González Videla
- Fernando González
- Marmaduque Grove
- Juan Guzmán Tapia
- Lucía Hiriart de Pinochet
- Tomás Hirsch
- Vicente Huidobro
- Aucán Huilcamán
- Alberto Hurtado
- Carlos Ibáñez del Campo
- José Miguel Insulza
- Víctor Jara
- Carlos Kaiser
- Carlos Keller
- Lady P
- Pedro Lagos
- Ricardo Lagos
- Alberto Larraguibel
- Francisco de la Lastra
- Juan José Latorre
- Lautaro (toqui)
- Joaquín Lavín
- Gustavo Leigh
- Bernardo Leighton
- Orlando Letelier
- Gonzalo Lira
- Sergio Livingstone
- Themo Lobos
- Carlos Lorca
- Margot Loyola
- Carlos Lucas
- Andrónico Luksic
- Patricio Lynch
- Juan Mackenna
- Juan Maino
- Francisco Maldonado da Silva
- Javier Margas
- Beatriz Marinello
- Juan Martinez de Rozas
- Nicolás Massú
- Roberto Matta
- Fernando Matthei
- Manfred Max-Neef
- Jorge Medina Estévez
- José Toribio Medina
- César Mendoza
- José Toribio Merino
- Michimalonco
- Milovan Mirosevic
- Paulina Mladinic
- Juan Ignacio Molina
- Juan Esteban Montero
- Christina Montt
- Jorge Montt
- Manuel Montt
- Pedro Montt
- Iván Morovic
- Heraldo Muñoz
- Mario Mutis
- Claudio Naranjo
- Francisco Nef
- Manuel Negrete (human rights victim)
- Hernán Neira
- Humberto Nilo
- Osvaldo Nunez
- Bernardo O'Higgins
- Guillermo "Willy" Oddó
- Rafael Olarra
- Víctor Olea Alegría
- Pedro Opazo
- Sergio Ortega
- José Tomás Ovalle
- Abraham Oyanedel
- Leonor Oyarzún
- Rodolfo Parada
- Ángel Parra (singer-songwriter)
- Ángel Parra Jr.
- Claudio Parra
- Colombina Parra
- Eduardo Parra
- Gabriel Parra
- Javiera Parra
- Nicanor Parra
- Jorge Peña Hen
- Candelaria Perez
- José Joaquín Pérez
- Carlos Pezoa Véliz
- Rodolfo Amando Philippi
- José Piñera
- Sebastián Piñera
- Augusto Pinochet
- Aníbal Pinto
- Carlos Pinto (journalist)
- Francisco Antonio Pinto
- Manuel Plaza
- Diego Portales
- Carlos Prats
- José Joaquín Prieto Vial
- Carmen Gloria Quintana
- Carlos Reinoso
- Pedro Reyes (footballer)
- Germán Riesco Errázuriz
- Juan Antonio Ríos
- Marcelo Ríos
- Ted Robledo
- Laura Rodríguez (Chilean politician)
- Manuel Rodríguez
- Rodrigo Rojas DeNegri
- Ricardo Francisco Rojas
- Raoul Ruiz
- Marcelo Salas
- Juan Luis Sanfuentes
- Domingo Santa María
- Federico Santa María
- José Santos Ossa
- Horatio Sanz
- René Schneider
- Luis Sepúlveda
- Miguel Serrano
- Raúl Silva Henríquez
- Alejandro Silva (musician)
- Víctor Domingo Silva
- Robert Winthrop Simpson
- Antonio Skármeta
- Fernando Solis
- Juan Somavía
- Mario Benavides Soto
- Carlos Sotomayor
- Robert Souper
- Roberto Souper
- Rodolfo Stange
- Inés de Suárez
- Juan Subercaseaux
- Jonnathan Tafra
- Nelson Tapia
- Carolina Tohá
- José Tohá
- Radomiro Tomic
- Tonka Tomicic
- Mateo de Toro y Zambrano
- Carlos Torres
- Orelie-Antoine I of Araucania and Patagonia
- Jorge Urrutia
- Matilde Urrutia
- Jorge Valdivia
- Pedro de Valdivia
- Sergio Valech
- Camilo Valenzuela
- Francisco Varela
- Leonor Varela
- Martín Vargas
- Valentina Vargas
- José María Vélaz
- Roberto Viaux
- Francisco Ramón Vicuña
- Benjamín Vicuña MacKenna
- José Antonio Vidaurre
- Benedicto Villablanca
- Ramón Vinay
- Klaus von Storch
- Gert Weil
- Juan Williams Rebolledo
- Iván Zamorano
- Manuel Ortíz de Zárate

=== Chilean people by occupation ===
- List of Chileans

==== Chilean astronomers ====
- Carlos Torres

==== Chilean aviators ====
- Dagoberto Godoy
- Klaus von Storch

==== Chilean biologists ====
- Erik Bongcam-Rudloff
- Humberto Maturana
- Francisco Varela

==== Chilean boxers ====
- Claudio Barrientos
- Patricia Demick
- Arturo Godoy
- Carlos Lucas
- Martín Vargas
- Benedicto Villablanca

==== Chilean canoers ====
- Jonnathan Tafra

==== Chilean chess players ====
- Klaus Junge
- Beatriz Marinello
- Iván Morovic

==== Chilean clergy ====
- Alberto Hurtado
- Juan Ignacio Molina
- José María Vélaz

===== Chilean bishops =====
- Carlos Camus
- Juan Subercaseaux

===== Chilean cardinals =====
- Francisco Javier Errázuriz Ossa
- Jorge Medina Estévez
- Raúl Silva Henríquez

==== Chilean computer scientists ====
- Eric Goles

==== Chilean economists ====
- Manfred Max-Neef
- José Piñera

==== Chilean footballers ====
- Clarence Acuña
- Cristián Andrés Álvarez Valenzuela
- Pedro Araya (footballer)
- Mauricio Aros
- Rodrigo Barrera
- Eduardo Bonvallet
- Claudio Bravo
- Carlos Campos (footballer, born 1937)
- Christian Castañeda
- Nicolás Córdova
- Fernando Cornejo
- Alejandro Escalona
- Fabián Estay
- Luis Eyzaguirre
- Elías Figueroa
- Ronald Fuentes
- Patricio Galaz
- Marcos González
- Mark González
- Sebastián González
- Antonio Luis Jiménez
- Honorino Landa
- Sergio Livingstone
- Cláudio Andrés Maldonado
- Javier Margas
- Nicolás Millán
- Milovan Mirosevic
- David Moya
- Luis Musrri
- Reinaldo Navia
- Manuel Neira
- Rafael Olarra
- Sebastián Pardo
- Nelson Parraguez
- Mauricio Pinilla
- David Pizarro
- Marcelo Ramírez
- Miguel Ramírez
- Carlos Reinoso
- Pedro Reyes
- George Robledo
- Ted Robledo
- Francisco Rojas Rojas
- Ricardo Francisco Rojas
- Roberto Rojas
- Sebastián Rozental
- Rodrigo Ruiz
- Marcelo Salas
- Alexis Sánchez (monoymous footballer "Alexis")
- Leonel Sánchez
- José Luis Sierra
- Mario Benavides Soto
- Hector Tapia
- Nelson Tapia
- Carlos Tejas
- Rodrigo Tello
- Jorge Valdivia
- Rodrigo Valenzuela
- Marcelo Vega
- Moisés Villarroel
- Iván Zamorano

==== Chilean golfers ====
- Felipe Aguilar
- Nicole Perrot

==== Chilean heads of state ====
- Luis Altamirano
- Bartolomé Blanche
- Julio Canessa
- José Miguel Carrera
- Carlos Dávila
- Agustín Eyzaguirre
- Ramón Freire
- Marmaduque Grove
- Carlos Ibáñez del Campo
- Francisco de la Lastra
- Gustavo Leigh
- Juan Martinez de Rozas
- Fernando Matthei
- César Mendoza
- José Toribio Merino
- Francisco Nef
- Bernardo O'Higgins
- Augusto Pinochet
- Rodolfo Stange
- Mateo de Toro y Zambrano

===== Royal Governors of Chile =====
- Royal Governor of Chile
- Francisco de Aguirre (conquistador)
- Melchor Bravo de Saravia
- Gabriel Cano de Aponte
- Alonso García de Ramón
- Francisco Antonio García Carrasco
- Martín García Óñez de Loyola
- García Hurtado de Mendoza, Marquis of Cañete
- Francisco Laso de la Vega
- Francisco López de Zúñiga
- Casimiro Marcó del Pont
- Tomás Marín de Poveda
- Luis Merlo de la Fuente
- Ambrosio O'Higgins, Marquis of Osorno
- Domingo Ortiz de Rosas
- Mariano Osorio
- Rodrigo de Quiroga
- Alonso de Ribera
- Martín Ruiz de Gamboa
- Alonso de Sotomayor
- Mateo de Toro y Zambrano
- Pedro de Valdivia
- Francisco de Villagra
- Pedro de Villagra

==== Chilean historians ====
- Diego Barros Arana
- Francisco Antonio Encina
- Benjamín Vicuña MacKenna
- Sergio Villalobos
- Gabriel Salazar

==== Chilean journalists ====
- Carolina Aguilera
- Carlos Pinto
- Fernando Solis

==== Chilean judges ====
- Juan Guzmán Tapia

==== Chilean mathematicians ====
- Eric Goles

==== Olympic competitors for Chile ====
- Marlene Ahrens
- Claudio Barrientos
- Matias Brain
- Sebastián González
- Alberto Larraguibel
- Carlos Lucas
- César Mendoza
- Reinaldo Navia
- Rafael Olarra
- David Pizarro
- Manuel Plaza
- Pedro Reyes
- Nelson Tapia
- Gert Weil
- Iván Zamorano

===== Olympic athletes of Chile =====
- Marlene Ahrens
- Manuel Plaza

==== Chilean ornithologists ====
- Juan Ignacio Molina
- Rodolfo Amando Philippi

==== Chilean painters ====
- Carlos Catasse
- Claudio Gonzalez
- Roberto Matta
- Camilo Mori
- Manuel Ortíz de Zárate
- Pedro Lira Rencoret
- Alfredo Valenzuela Puelma
- Álvaro Casanova Zenteno
- Eugenio Cruz Vargas
- Nicolás Guzmán Bustamante
- Pascual Ortega Portales
- Juan Mochi
- Alberto Valenzuela Llanos

==== Chilean philosophers ====
- Helio Gallardo
- Humberto Maturana
- Francisco Varela

==== Chilean photographers ====
- Ricardo Carrasco
- Claudio Gonzalez
- Juan Maino

==== Chilean physicians ====
- Salvador Allende
- Michelle Bachelet
- Jose Ignacio Egaña

==== Chilean physicists ====
- Claudio Bunster

==== Chilean poets ====
- Sergio Badilla Castillo
- Alberto Baeza Flores
- Elicura Chihuailaf
- Vicente Huidobro
- Pedro Lastra
- Gabriela Mistral
- Pablo Neruda
- Nicanor Parra
- Carlos Pezoa Véliz
- David Rosenmann-Taub
- Víctor Domingo Silva
- Eugenio Cruz Vargas

==== Chilean polymaths ====
- Gabriela Mistral

==== Chilean models ====
- Belén Montilla
- Constanza Silva
- Gabriela Barros
- Hil Hernández
- Marie Ann Salas
- Renata Ruiz
- Valentina Cárdenas

==== Chilean psychologists ====
- Claudio Naranjo

==== Chilean racecar drivers ====
- Juan Carlos Carbonell
- Juan Zanelli

===== Formula One drivers from Chile =====
- Eliseo Salazar

==== Chilean tennis players ====
- Ricardo Acuña
- Paul Capdeville
- Jaime Fillol
- Hans Gildemeister
- Fernando González
- Anita Lizana
- Nicolás Massú
- Marcelo Ríos

==== Chilean triathletes ====
- Matias Brain

=== Chilean families ===
- Alessandri family
- Carrera family
- Cruz Family
- Frei family
- Errázuriz Family
- Montt family
- Parra family
- Vergara family

=== Chilean human rights victim ===
- Alberto Bachelet
- Charles Horman
- Víctor Jara
- Orlando Letelier
- Carlos Lorca
- Juan Maino
- Manuel Negrete (human rights victim)
- Víctor Olea Alegría
- Jorge Peña Hen
- Carmen Gloria Quintana
- Rodrigo Rojas DeNegri

=== Chilean people by ethnic or national origin ===
- List of Chilean Jews

==== People of Chilean descent ====
===== Chilean-Americans =====
- Arturo Valenzuela
- Ariel Dorfman
- Don Francisco (television host)
- Jorge Garcia
- Isabel Allende
- Patricia Demick
- Horatio Sanz
- Alexander Witt
- Tom Araya

===== Chilean Argentines =====
- Alicia Kirchner
- Néstor Kirchner

===== Chilean Australians =====
- Rodrigo Vargas

===== Chilean-Canadians =====
- José Miguel Contreras
- Beto Cuevas
- Alberto Guerrero
- Oscar Lopez

===== Chilean-Mexicans =====
- Lucho Gatica
- Luis Gatica
- Alejandro Jodorowsky
- Carlos Reinoso
- Rodrigo Ruiz

===== Chilean-New Zealanders =====
- Marco Rojas

===== Chilean-Spaniards =====
- Alejandro Amenábar

===== Chilean Swedes =====
- Erik Bongcam-Rudloff

==== Chilean expatriates ====
- Osvaldo Nunez

==== Expatriates in Chile ====
===== American expatriates in Chile =====
- Todd Temkin

==== Bolivian-Chileans ====
- Andrónico Luksic

==== Brazilian-Chileans ====
- Marcos González

==== Croatian Chileans ====
- Jéssica Eterovic
- Eric Goles
- Andrónico Luksic
- Milovan Mirosevic
- Paulina Mladinic
- Iván Morovic
- Leonor Oyarzún
- Antonio Skármeta
- Jonnathan Tafra
- Radomiro Tomic
- Tonka Tomicic
- Néstor Kirchner
- Andrés Morales Milohnic

==== English-Chileans ====
- Jorge Edwards
- Marmaduque Grove
- Gustavo Leigh
- Bernardo Leighton
- Sergio Livingstone
- Carlos Walker Martínez
- Juan Williams Rebolledo
- George Robledo
- Ted Robledo
- Alexander Witt

==== French Chileans ====
- Bartolomé Blanche
- Alberto Fuguet
- Nicole Perrot
- Augusto Pinochet
- Roberto Viaux

==== German Chileans ====
- Marlene Ahrens
- Gustavo Becerra-Schmidt
- Erik Bongcam-Rudloff
- Hans Gildemeister
- Jorge González von Marées
- Oscar Hahn
- Tomás Hirsch
- Carlos Kaiser
- Sebastián Keitel
- Carlos Keller
- Mathias Klotz
- Don Francisco (television host)
- Fernando Matthei
- Rodolfo Amando Philippi
- René Schneider
- Klaus von Storch
- Gert Weil

==== Hungarian Chileans ====
- Nicolás Massú
- Antonio Horvath
- Carlos Caszely
- Mathias Vidangossy

==== Irish Chileans ====
- Patricio Aylwin
- Alberto Blest Gana
- Charlotte Lewis
- Patricio Lynch
- Juan Mackenna
- Bernardo O'Higgins
- Benjamín Vicuña MacKenna
- Andrés Wood

==== Italian Chileans ====
- Arturo Alessandri
- Jorge Alessandri
- Anacleto Angelini
- Cecilia Bolocco
- Eduardo Gatti
- Fernando González
- Beatriz Marinello
- Joaquín Toesca

==== Japanese Chileans ====
- Camilo Mori

==== Chilean Jews ====
- Ariel Dorfman
- Don Francisco (television host)
- Tomás Hirsch
- Alejandro Jodorowsky
- Francisco Maldonado da Silva
- Nicolás Massú
- Sebastián Rozental
- Volodia Teitelboim

==== Moldovan Chileans ====
- Volodia Teitelboim

==== Palestinian Chileans ====
- Miguel Littin
- Nicolás Massú

==== Polish-Chileans ====
- Ignacy Domeyko

==== Russian Chileans ====
- Alejandro Jodorowsky

==== Scottish Chileans ====
- Carlos Condell
- Alexander Cameron
- Andrés Wood

==== South African-Chileans ====
- Mark González

==== Spanish-Chileans ====
- Mark González

==== Swiss-Chileans ====
- Eduardo Frei Montalva
- Eduardo Frei Ruiz-Tagle

==== Ukrainian Chileans ====
- Volodia Teitelboim

==== Uruguayan Chileans ====
- Nelson Acosta

=== Chilean Freemasons ===
- Arturo Alessandri
- Salvador Allende
- Alberto Bachelet
- Bernardo O'Higgins

=== People by city in Chile ===
==== People from Chillan ====
- Claudio Arrau
- Ramón Vinay

=== LGBT people from Chile ===
- Raúl Ruiz

=== Chilean people stubs ===
- Abraham Oyanedel
- Alberto Bachelet
- Alberto Baeza Flores
- Alberto Fuguet
- Alberto Guerrero
- Aliro Godoy
- Álvaro Guevara
- Antonio Luis Jiménez
- Antonio Skármeta
- Arturo Alessandri
- Aucán Huilcamán
- Bartolomé Blanche
- Benjamín Vicuña MacKenna
- Bernardo Leighton
- Camilo Valenzuela
- Candelaria Pérez
- Carlos Campos
- Carlos Lucas
- Carlos Pinto
- Carlos Reinoso
- Carmen Gloria Quintana
- Carolina Tohá
- Caupolicán
- Christian Castañeda
- Clarence Acuña
- Claudio Barrientos
- Claudio González
- Claudio Huepe
- Claudio Naranjo
- Claudio Parra
- Claudio Valenzuela
- Clodomiro Almeyda
- Colocolo (tribal chief)
- Cristián Andrés Álvarez Valenzuela
- Dagoberto Godoy
- Diamela Eltit
- Diego Barros
- Diego Barros Arana
- Diego Portales
- Domingo Ortiz de Rosas
- Eduardo Barrios
- Eduardo Carrasco
- Emiliano Figueroa Larraín
- Fabián Estay
- Federico Errázuriz Echaurren
- Federico Errázuriz Zañartu
- Fernando Errázuriz Aldunate
- Fernando Matthei
- Fernando Solís
- Francisco Antonio Encina
- Francisco Antonio Pinto
- Francisco Coloane
- Francisco Ibáñez de Peralta
- Francisco Maldonado da Silva
- Francisco Nef
- Francisco Ruiz-Tagle
- Francisco de la Lastra
- Gabriel Cano de Aponte
- Germán Riesco
- Gonzalo Rojas
- Guillermo "Willy" Oddó
- Gustavo Leigh
- Hans Gildemeister
- Heraldo Muñoz
- Hernán Neira
- Honorino Landa
- Horacio Salinas
- Huillac Ñusca
- Humberto Maturana
- Humberto Nilo
- Iván Morovic
- Javiera Carrera
- Javiera Parra
- Joaquín Larraín Gandarillas
- Joaquín Lavín
- Jorge Medina Estévez
- Jorge Edwards
- Jorge González von Marées
- Jorge Montt
- Jorge Peña Hen
- Jorge Urrutia
- José Antonio Vidaurre
- José Donoso
- José Joaquín Pérez
- José Manuel Balmaceda
- José María Vélaz
- José Tohá
- José de Santiago Concha Jiménez Lobatón
- Juan Andrés de Ustariz
- Juan Emilio Cheyre
- Juan Esteban Montero
- Juan Ignacio Molina
- Juan Mackenna
- Juan Orrego-Salas
- Juan Somavía
- Julio Canessa
- Jéssica Eterovic
- Klaus von Storch
- Laura Rodríguez (Chilean politician)
- Lorenzo de Arrau
- Lucía Hiriart de Pinochet
- Luis Altamirano
- Luis Carrera
- Luis Musrri
- Luisa Durán
- Manfred Max-Neef
- Manuel Blanco Encalada
- Manuel Bulnes
- Manuel Montt
- Manuel Neira
- Manuel Plaza
- Marco Bechis
- Mario Mutis
- Marlene Ahrens
- Matilde Urrutia
- Mauricio Aros
- Milovan Mirosevic
- Máximo Carvajal
- Nicanor Parra
- Nicolás Córdova
- Osvaldo Andrade
- Patricio Contreras
- Patricio Galaz
- Paul Delano
- Paulina Mladinic
- Pedro Aguirre Cerda
- Pedro Araya (footballer)
- Pedro Lastra
- Pedro Montt
- Pedro Opazo
- Ramón Barros Luco
- Raúl Silva Henríquez
- Ricardo Acuña
- Ricardo Francisco Rojas
- Roberto Castillo Sandoval
- Roberto Souper
- Rodolfo Amando Philippi
- Rodolfo Parada
- Rodolfo Stange
- Rodrigo Barrera
- Sebastián Rozental
- Sergio Livingstone
- Sergio Valech
- Template:Chile-bio-stub
- Themo Lobos
- Tito Beltrán
- Tomás Hirsch
- Tomás Marín de Poveda
- Tonka Tomicic
- Violeta Parra
- Virgilio Paz Romero
- Vittorio Corbo
- Víctor Domingo Silva
- Víctor Olea Alegría

== Politics of Chile ==
- Abortion in Chile
- Chile under Allende
- Chile under Pinochet
- Chilean political scandals
- Electoral division of Chile
- Manuel Rodríguez Patriotic Front
- List of Government Juntas of Chile
- Liberalism and radicalism in Chile
- Chilean nationalization of copper
- Politics of Chile
- President of Chile

=== Political parties in Chile ===
- List of political parties in Chile
- Alliance for Chile
- Chilean Communist Party (Proletarian Action)
- Christian Democrat Party of Chile
- Christian Left Party (Chile)
- Coalition of Parties for Democracy
- Communist Party of Chile
- Green Party of Chile
- Humanist Party (Chile)
- Independent Democrat Union
- Juntos Podemos Más
- National Alliance of Independents
- National Party (Chile)
- National Renewal (Chile)
- National Socialist Movement of Chile
- Party for Democracy
- People's Revolutionary Party (Chile)
- Popular Unity
- Progressive Union of the Centrist Center
- Radical Democracy Party (Chile)
- Regionalist Action Party of Chile
- Revolutionary Communist Party (Chile)
- Revolutionary Left Movement (Chile)
- Social Democrat Radical Party
- Socialist Party of Chile

=== Chilean politicians ===
- Arturo Alessandri
- Jorge Alessandri
- Isabel Allende Bussi
- Andrés Pascal Allende
- Salvador Allende
- Clodomiro Almeyda
- Carlos Altamirano
- Soledad Alvear
- Osvaldo Andrade
- Patricio Aylwin
- Michelle Bachelet
- Abdón Cifuentes
- Carlos Dávila
- Miguel Enríquez Espinosa
- Federico Errázuriz Echaurren
- Francisco Javier Errázuriz Talavera
- Fernando Flores
- Eduardo Frei Montalva
- Eduardo Frei Ruiz-Tagle
- Jorge González von Marées
- Marmaduque Grove
- Tomás Hirsch
- Claudio Huepe
- Aucán Huilcamán
- José Miguel Insulza
- Carlos Keller
- Ricardo Lagos
- Joaquín Lavín
- Bernardo Leighton
- Orlando Letelier
- Carlos Lorca
- Gladys Marín
- Manfred Max-Neef
- Heraldo Muñoz
- Abraham Oyanedel
- José Piñera
- Sebastián Piñera
- Augusto Pinochet
- Diego Portales
- Carlos Prats
- Laura Rodríguez (Chilean politician)
- Sonia Tschorne
- Volodia Teitelboim
- Carolina Tohá
- José Tohá
- Radomiro Tomic
- Adolfo Zaldívar
- Andrés Zaldívar

==== Presidents of Chile ====
- President of Chile
- Pedro Aguirre Cerda
- Arturo Alessandri
- Jorge Alessandri
- Salvador Allende
- Patricio Aylwin
- Michelle Bachelet
- José Manuel Balmaceda
- Ramón Barros Luco
- Manuel Blanco Encalada
- Manuel Bulnes
- Carlos Dávila
- Federico Errázuriz Echaurren
- Federico Errázuriz Zañartu
- Fernando Errázuriz Aldunate
- Agustín Eyzaguirre
- Elías Fernández Albano
- Emiliano Figueroa Larraín
- Eduardo Frei Montalva
- Eduardo Frei Ruiz-Tagle
- Ramón Freire
- Gabriel González Videla
- Carlos Ibáñez del Campo
- Ricardo Lagos
- Juan Esteban Montero
- Jorge Montt
- Manuel Montt
- Pedro Montt
- Pedro Opazo
- José Tomás Ovalle y Bezanilla
- Abraham Oyanedel
- José Joaquín Pérez
- Sebastián Piñera
- Augusto Pinochet
- Aníbal Pinto
- Francisco Antonio Pinto
- José Joaquín Prieto
- Germán Riesco Errázuriz
- Juan Antonio Ríos
- Francisco Ruiz-Tagle Portales
- Juan Luis Sanfuentes
- Domingo Santa María González
- Francisco Ramón Vicuña Larraín

==== Chilean communists ====
- Luis Corvalán
- Víctor Jara
- Gladys Marín
- Pablo Neruda
- Violeta Parra

==== Supreme Directors of Chile ====
- José Miguel Carrera
- Ramón Freire
- Francisco de la Lastra
- Bernardo O'Higgins

== Provinces of Chile ==
- Provinces of Chile
- Antártica Chilena Province
- Antofagasta Province
- Arica Province
- Biobío Province
- Cardenal Caro Province
- Cauquenes Province
- Cautín Province
- Chacabuco Province
- Chiloé Province
- Colchagua Province
- Cordillera Province, Chile
- Curicó Province
- Iquique Province
- Isla Navarino
- Linares Province
- Llanquihue Province
- Maipo Province
- Ñuble Province
- Osorno Province
- Palena Province
- Parinacota Province
- Province of Los Andes, Chile
- Santiago Province (Chile)
- Talca Province
- Tierra del Fuego Province, Chile
- Última Esperanza Province
- Valdivia Province

=== Llanquihue Province ===
- Frutillar
- Puerto Montt
- Puerto Varas

=== Última Esperanza Province ===
- Última Esperanza Province
- Cerro Chaltén
- Cerro Torre
- Cordillera del Paine
- Magallanes y la Antártica Chilena Region
- Puerto Natales
- Southern Patagonian Ice Field

== Regions of Chile ==
- Regions of Chile
- Antofagasta Region
- Araucanía Region
- Arica-Parinacota Region
- Atacama Region
- Aisén Region
- Bío-Bío Region
- Coquimbo Region
- Los Lagos Region
- Los Ríos Region
- Magallanes y la Antártica Chilena Region
- Maule Region
- O'Higgins Region
- Santiago Metropolitan Region
- Tarapacá Region
- Valparaíso Region
- Wikipedia:WikiProject Countries/Templates/Navboxes

=== Bío-Bío Region ===
- Arauco Province
- Biobío Province
- Biotren
- Biobío Province
- Bío-Bío Region
- Bío-Bío River
- Chillán
- Club Deportivo Ferroviario Almirante Arturo Fernández Vial
- Cobquecura
- Concepción, Chile
- Laja Falls
- Laja River (Chile)
- Los Ángeles
- Ñuble Province (1974–2018)
- Penco
- Talcahuano
- Universidad Católica de la Santísima Concepción
- Universidad San Sebastián
- Universidad de Concepción
- Universidad del Bío-Bío

=== Municipalities of Chile ===
- La Calera
- Lo Barnechea
- El Bosque (municipality, Chile)
- Cerrillos (municipality)
- Cerro Navia
- Chanco (Chile)
- La Cisterna
- Colbún
- Las Condes
- Conchalí
- Corral
- Curacautin
- Empedrado, Talca
- Lo Espejo
- Estación Central
- La Florida, Chile
- La Granja (municipality)
- Huechuraba
- Independencia (municipality, Chile)
- Linares, Chile
- Longaví
- Macul
- Maipú (municipality)
- Ñuñoa
- Parral, Chile
- Pedro Aguirre Cerda (municipality)
- Pelluhue
- Pencahue
- Peñalolén
- La Pintana
- Lo Prado
- Providencia (municipality, Chile)
- Pudahuel
- Quilicura
- Quinta Normal
- Recoleta (municipality)
- La Reina
- Renca
- Retiro, Chile
- San Fabián
- San Javier, Chile
- San Joaquín
- San Miguel (municipality)
- San Ramón, Chile
- Santiago (municipality)
- Villa Alegre, Chile
- Vitacura
- Yerbas Buenas

== Religion in Chile ==
- Islam in Chile
- Roman Catholicism in Chile

=== Roman Catholic dioceses in Chile ===
- Archdiocese of Antofagasta
  - Diocese of Arica
  - Diocese of Iquique
  - Territorial Prelature of Calama
- Archdiocese of Concepción, Chile (created as Diócesis de La Santísima Concepción)
  - Diocese of Chillán
  - Roman Catholic Diocese of Los Ángeles
  - Diocese of Temuco
  - Diocese of Villarrica
  - Diocese of Valdivia
- Archdiocese of La Serena
  - Diocese of Copiapó
  - Territorial Prelature of Illapel
- Archdiocese of Santiago de Chile
  - Diocese of San Felipe
  - Diocese of Valparaíso
  - Diocese of Melipilla
  - Diocese of San Bernardo
  - Diocese of Rancagua
  - Diocese of Talca
  - Diocese of Linares, Chile
- Archdiocese of Puerto Montt
  - Diocese of Osorno
  - Diocese of San Carlos de Ancud
  - Diocese of Punta Arenas
- Apostolic Vicariate of Aysén
- Diocese for the Military Services (Obispado Castrense)

== Science and technology in Chile ==
- Atacama Submillimeter Telescope Experiment
- Cetacean Conservation Center
- European Southern Observatory
- Very Large Telescope

=== Chilean scientists ===
"See also: Chilean biochemists"

=== Ships of Chile ===
==== World War I ships of Chile ====
- Chilean cruiser Chacabuco (1898)

==== World War II ships of Chile ====
- Chilean cruiser Chacabuco (1898)

== Chilean society ==
- Asociación de Guías y Scouts de Chile
- Demographics of Chile
- Huaso
- Mapuche
- Public holidays in Chile

=== Ethnic groups in Chile ===
- Alacalufe people
- Austronesian people
- Aymara people
- Diaguita
- Mapuche
- Rapanui
- Selkʼnam

=== Mapuche ===
- Caupolican
- Colocolo (tribal chief)
- Huilliche
- Lautaro (toqui)
- Mapuche
- Picunche
- Toqui

==== Mapudungu ====
- Huillice language
- Mapudungun

== Sport in Chile ==
- Chile at the 2006 Winter Paralympics
- Chile national rugby union team
- Chilean rodeo
- Surfing in Chile

=== Basketball in Chile ===
- Chile national basketball team
- 1932 South American Basketball Championship
- 1937 South American Basketball Championship
- 1942 South American Basketball Championship

=== Sports festivals hosted in Chile ===
- 1962 FIFA World Cup

==== 1962 FIFA World Cup ====
- 1962 FIFA World Cup
- Battle of Santiago
- 1962 FIFA World Cup qualification
- 1962 FIFA World Cup squads

===== 1962 FIFA World Cup players =====
- Jozef Adamec
- Adelardo Rodríguez
- Flórián Albert
- Enrico Albertosi
- José Altafini
- Altair Gomes de Figueiredo
- Amarildo
- Stan Anderson
- Jimmy Armfield
- Georgi Asparuhov
- Gordon Banks
- Hilderaldo Bellini
- Jozef Bomba
- Albert Brülls
- Lorenzo Buffon
- Giacomo Bulgarelli
- Carlos Campos
- Antonio Carbajal
- Carlos José Castilho
- Bobby Charlton
- Igor Chislenko
- John Connelly (footballer, born 1938)
- Luís Cubilla
- Mario David (footballer)
- Alfredo Di Stéfano
- Valdir Pereira
- Djalma Santos
- Bryan Douglas
- George Eastham
- Herbert Erhardt
- Luis Eyzaguirre
- Ron Flowers
- Milan Galić
- Garrincha
- Francisco Gento
- Gilmar
- Jimmy Greaves
- Gyula Grosics
- Helmut Haller
- Johnny Haynes
- Gerry Hitchens
- Alan Hodgkinson
- Don Howe
- Roger Hunt
- Valentin Ivanov
- Josef Jelínek
- Dražan Jerković
- Josef Kadraba
- Derek Kevan
- Andrej Kvašňák
- Jan Lála
- Honorino Landa
- Cesare Maldini
- Eulogio Martínez
- Silvio Marzolini
- Humberto Maschio
- Václav Mašek
- Josef Masopust
- Mauro Ramos
- Bobby Moore
- Nílton Santos
- Maurice Norman
- Ladislav Novák
- Alan Peacock
- Joaquín Peiró
- Pelé
- José Macia
- Svatopluk Pluskal
- Viktor Ponedelnik
- Ján Popluhár
- Ferenc Puskás
- Antonio Rattín
- Severino Reija
- Gianni Rivera
- Bobby Robson
- Antonio Roma
- Leonel Sánchez
- José Santamaría
- Hans Schäfer
- Adolf Scherer
- Heinz Schneiter
- Karl-Heinz Schnellinger
- Viliam Schrojf
- Uwe Seeler
- Dragoslav Šekularac
- Omar Sivori
- Josip Skoblar
- Ron Springett
- Luis Suárez Miramontes
- Peter Swan
- Horst Szymaniak
- Ely Tacchella
- Lajos Tichy
- Hans Tilkowski
- Giovanni Trapattoni
- Horacio Troche
- Vavá
- Ray Wilson (footballer)
- Rolf Wüthrich
- Dimitar Yakimov
- Lev Yashin
- Mário Zagallo
- José Ely de Miranda
- Zózimo

===== FIFA World Cup 1962 managers =====
- Lajos Baróti
- Giovanni Ferrari
- Sepp Herberger
- Helenio Herrera
- Juan Carlos Lorenzo
- Aymoré Moreira
- Adolfo Pedernera
- Walter Winterbottom

===== 1962 FIFA World Cup Squad Templates =====
- Template:Argentina squad 1962 FIFA World Cup
- Template:Brazil squad 1962 FIFA World Cup
- Template:West Germany squad 1962 FIFA World Cup
- Template:Italy squad 1962 FIFA World Cup

=== Football in Chile ===
- Chile national football team
- Chile national under-20 football team
- Chile national under-17 football team
- 1962 FIFA World Cup
- Ballet Azul
- Battle of Santiago
- Federación de Fútbol de Chile
- Chilean football league system
- Liga Chilena de Fútbol: Primera División
- Los de Abajo

==== Chilean football clubs ====
- Club de Deportes Antofagasta
- Audax Club Sportivo Italiano
- Cobreloa
- Club Deportes Cobresal
- Colo-Colo
- Coquimbo Unido
- Corporación Deportiva Everton de Viña del Mar
- Club Deportivo Huachipato
- Club de Deportes La Serena
- Club Deportivo O'Higgins
- Club Deportivo Palestino
- Club de Deportes Puerto Montt
- Club Social de Deportes Rangers de Talca
- Club de Deportes Santiago Morning
- Club de Deportes Santiago Wanderers
- Club Deportivo Universidad Católica
- Club Deportivo Universidad de Concepción
- Universidad de Chile (football club)
- Unión Española

==== Footballers in Chile by club ====
===== Universidad de Chile players =====
- Clarence Acuña
- Mauricio Aros
- Faustino Asprilla
- Richard Báez
- Carlos Campos
- Christian Castañeda
- Luis Eyzaguirre
- Ronald Fuentes
- Patricio Galaz
- Marcos González
- Luis Musrri
- Rafael Olarra
- Sebastián Pardo
- Manuel Pellegrini
- Mauricio Pinilla
- David Pizarro
- Jorge Quinteros
- Pedro Reyes
- Ricardo Francisco Rojas
- Marcelo Salas
- Leonel Sánchez
- Rodrigo Tello
- Rodrigo Valenzuela
- Marcelo Vega

==== Chilean football managers ====
- Nelson Acosta
- Manuel Pellegrini

==== Chile national football team templates ====
- Template:Chile squad 1998 FIFA World Cup

=== Chile at the Olympics ===
- Chile at the 1928 Summer Olympics
- Chile at the 1936 Summer Olympics
- Chile at the 1948 Summer Olympics
- Chile at the 1952 Summer Olympics
- Chile at the 1956 Summer Olympics
- Chile at the 1960 Summer Olympics
- Chile at the 1964 Summer Olympics
- Chile at the 1968 Summer Olympics
- Chile at the 1972 Summer Olympics
- Chile at the 1976 Summer Olympics
- Chile at the 1984 Summer Olympics
- Chile at the 1988 Summer Olympics
- Chile at the 1992 Summer Olympics
- Chile at the 1996 Summer Olympics
- Chile at the 2000 Summer Olympics
- Chile at the 2004 Summer Olympics
- Chile at the 2006 Winter Olympics

==== Olympic tennis players of Chile ====
- Fernando González
- Nicolás Massú
- Marcelo Ríos

=== Chilean sportspeople ===
==== Chilean athletes ====
- Marlene Ahrens
- Sebastián Keitel
- Manuel Plaza
- Gert Weil

==== Chilean equestrians ====
- Alberto Larraguibel
- César Mendoza
- Oscar Cristi
- Gabriel Donoso
- José A. Santos
- Ramón Cardemil

==== Chilean field hockey players ====
- Veronica Planella

== Tourism in Chile ==
=== Airlines of Chile ===
- Aero Cardal
- Aerovías DAP
- Alpine Air Express Chile
- LAN Airlines
- LAN Chile Cargo
- LANExpress
- Ladeco
- Sky Airline

== Transportation in Chile ==
=== Roads ===
- List of expressways in Chile
- List of highways in Chile

=== Buses ===
- Transantiago

=== Mountain passes ===
- List of mountain passes of Chile

=== Subways ===
- Santiago Metro
- List of Valparaíso metro stations
- Metrotrén

=== Trains ===
- Biotren
- FC Caleta Coloso a Aguas Blancas
- FC de Junin
- Ferrocarril de Antofagasta a Bolivia

=== LATAM Airlines ===
- ABSA – Aerolinhas Brasileiras
- LATAM Airlines
- LATAM Airlines destinations
- LAN Chile Cargo
- LATAM Ecuador
- LATAM Peru
- LANExpress

== Chile stubs ==
- Abortion in Chile
- Aero Cardal
- Almirante Condell
- Almirante Lynch
- Alpine Air Express Chile
- Arena Santiago
- Baltimore Crisis
- First Battle of Cancha Rayada
- Second Battle of Cancha Rayada
- Battle of Pisagua
- Battle of San Francisco
- Battle of Tarapacá
- Battle of Topáter
- Slit throats case
- Bombardment of Callao
- CDtv
- Canal 13 (Chile)
- Canal del Fútbol (Chile)
- Carretera Austral
- Cetacean Conservation Center
- Chile at the 1928 Summer Olympics
- Chile at the 1936 Summer Olympics
- Chile at the 1948 Summer Olympics
- Chile at the 1952 Summer Olympics
- Chile at the 1956 Summer Olympics
- Chile at the 1960 Summer Olympics
- Chile at the 1964 Summer Olympics
- Chile at the 1968 Summer Olympics
- Chile at the 1972 Summer Olympics
- Chile at the 1976 Summer Olympics
- Chile at the 1984 Summer Olympics
- Chile at the 1992 Summer Olympics
- Chile at the 2006 Winter Paralympics
- Chilean Council of State
- Chilean battleship Almirante Latorre
- Chilean cruiser Chacabuco (1898)
- Chilean destroyer Aldea (1928)
- 1925 Chilean presidential election
- Chilean rodeo
- Chilevisión
- Compañía Chilena de Televisión
- Corral
- Costanera Center
- Cruz del Tercer Milenio
- DINA
- Diocese of La Santísima Concepción
- Disaster of Rancagua
- Distribución y Servicio
- El Siglo (Chile)
- Entel
- Estadio Carlos Dittborn
- Estadio El Cobre
- Estadio El Teniente
- Estadio Fiscal
- Estadio Francisco Sánchez Rumoroso
- Estadio La Portada
- Estadio Las Higueras
- Estadio Monumental David Arellano
- Estadio Municipal de Calama
- Estadio Municipal de Concepción
- Estadio Municipal de La Florida
- Estadio Playa Ancha
- Estadio Regional de Antofagasta
- Estadio Regional de Chinquihue
- Estadio San Carlos de Apoquindo
- Estadio Santa Laura
- Estadio Santiago Bueras
- Estadio Sausalito
- Etc...TV
- Fatherland and Liberty
- Gondwana (Chilean band)
- Guaraculén
- Huaso
- Huilliche
- Humberstone and Santa Laura Saltpeter Works
- Ignacio Carrera Pinto
- Instituto Nacional
- Jaime Guzmán
- Kudai
- La Negra Antofagasta
- La Prensa de Curicó
- La Tercera
- Las Últimas Noticias
- Liberal Party of Chile
- List of Chilean companies
- Los Ríos Region
- Lucybell
- Manuel Rodríguez Patriotic Front
- Medialuna
- National Women's Service
- Operation Colombo
- Party for Democracy
- Picunche
- Plaza de la Ciudadanía
- Putagán
- Radio Cooperativa
- Red Televisiva Megavisión
- Rettig Report
- Rodrigo Rojas DeNegri
- Rojasfilms
- Saavedra, Chile
- San Fernando, Chile
- Santiago College
- Serrano class destroyer
- Sex and Pornography Day
- TV Senado
- TVU (Chile)
- Telecanal
- Template:Chile-stub
- The Grange School, Santiago
- The House of the Spirits (film)
- The Road to Maipo
- Tierra del Fuego Province, Chile
- Tocopilla
- UCV TV
- Unidad Anti-Terrorista
- Universidad Alberto Hurtado
- Universidad Arturo Prat
- Universidad Austral de Chile
- Universidad Católica de Temuco
- Universidad Católica de la Santísima Concepción
- Universidad Católica del Maule
- Universidad Católica del Norte
- Universidad Gabriela Mistral
- Universidad Metropolitana de Ciencias de la Educación
- Universidad San Sebastián
- Universidad Tecnológica Metropolitana
- Universidad de Antofagasta
- Universidad de Artes, Ciencias y Comunicación
- Universidad de La Frontera
- Universidad de La Serena
- Universidad de Los Lagos
- Universidad de Magallanes
- Universidad de Playa Ancha de Ciencias de la Educación
- Universidad de Talca
- Universidad de Tarapacá
- Universidad de Valparaíso
- Universidad del Bío-Bío
- University of Santiago, Chile
- VTR Globalcom
- Via X
- Visviri
- Wallatiri
- Williamson-Balfour Company
- Wisetrack
- Zona Latina
- Óptima Televisión
- Última Esperanza Province

== Other ==
- Hiking in Chile
- Asociación de Guías y Scouts de Chile
- Chile Antarctic Geopolitics
- Communications in Chile
- Economic history of Chile
- Education in Chile
- Elections in Chile
- Foreign relations of Chile
- Holidays in Chile
- Human rights in Chile
- ISO 3166-2:CL
- Law of Chile
- List of Chilean companies
- List of Chilean television channels
- List of Chileans
- SURES
- Transport in Chile
- United Nations
- U.S. intervention in Chile
- Water supply and sanitation in Chile

== See also ==
- List of international rankings
- Lists of country-related topics
- Outline of geography
- Outline of South America
- United Nations
