= TVU =

TVU may refer to:

== Entertainment and media ==
- RadioU TV, formerly known as TVU, an American Christian rock music channel
- TVU (Chile), Chilean educational channel
- TVUnetworks, a company that manufactures live mobile television broadcasting equipment
- The Velvet Underground, was an American rock band
- The Veer Union, a Canadian rock band
- TV-U Fukushima, a television station (channel 26 digital) licensed to Fukushima, Fukushima Prefecture, Japan
- TV-U Yamagata, a television station (channel 20 digital) licensed to Yamagata, Yamagata Prefecture, Japan

== Universities ==
- Technical and Vocational University, a public university in Iran
- Thames Valley University, a university in England

== Other ==
- Matei Airport (IATA airport code)
