= Carlos Kaiser =

Carlos Kaiser may refer to:

- Carlos Kaiser (footballer) (born 1963), Brazilian footballer
- Carlos Kaiser (activist) (born 1974), Chilean activist for people with disabilities

== See also ==
- Kaiser (surname)
