= Roberto Castillo Sandoval =

Chilean author (born 1957)

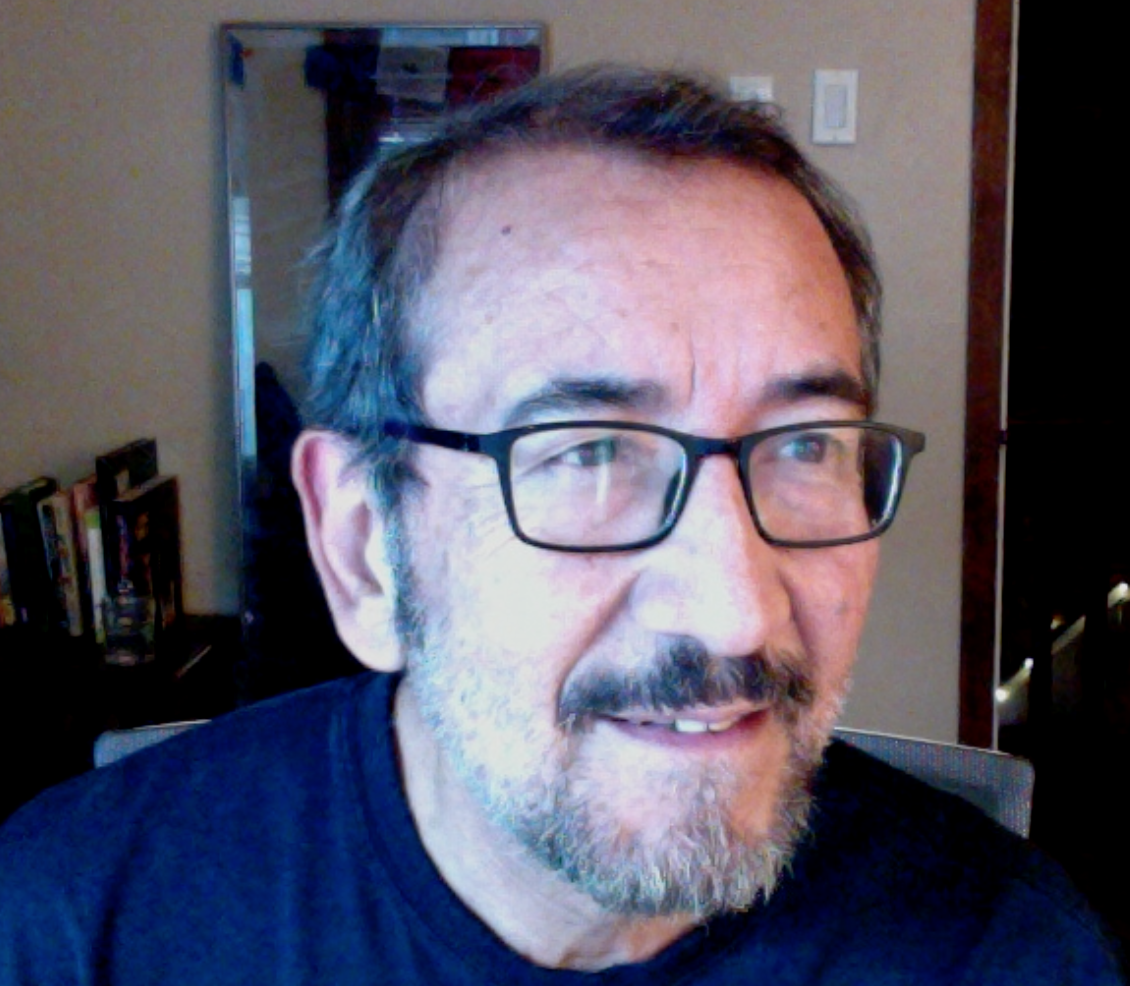
- Roberto Castillo in 2022
- Born: November 14, 1957 (age 68); Santiago, Chile

Roberto Castillo Sandoval (born November 14, 1957) is a Chilean author, translator and professor of Spanish and Comparative Literature at Haverford College in Haverford, Pennsylvania. He has a Ph.D. and A.M. in Romance Languages and Literatures from Harvard University (1992 and 1987, respectively), an M.A. in Latin American Literature from Vanderbilt University (1985) and a B.A. in Sociology from Kenyon College (1982).

His latest novel, La novela del corazón (Laurel Editores, 2022) loosely based on the history of heart transplants in Chile in the 1960's, won the prestigious Santiago Municipal Literature Award, Chile's oldest continuous literary award, in 2023.

His novel in the form of fictional obituaries, Muertes imaginarias (Laurel Editores, 2020) was named "Best of 2020 Narrative Fiction Book" by the Chilean Art Critics Circle.

His novel Muriendo por la dulce patria mía (Planeta, 1998; republished, with a new version and postscript by Laurel Editores, 2017) is a fictional account centered on Chilean heavyweight boxer Arturo Godoy A film based on this book, Rey del Ring, produced by Max Gandarillas, directed by Rodrigo Sepúlveda, starring Marko Zaror, Benjamín Vicuña, and Fiorella Bottaioli, was released in theaters in Chile in October, 2025 and streamed in Disney+ Latin America in February 2026.

A collection of essays and chronicles, Antípodas. Ensayos y crónicas (Cuarto Propio, 2014) was one of three finalists for the Santiago Municipal Prize in the Essay category, 2015.

Among his translations from English into Spanish are Herman Melville's Bartleby, the Scrivener and Nathaniel Hawthorne's Wakefield, published by Hueders in 2017 and 2019, respectively.

In addition, he has published scholarly essays on Latin American colonial and contemporary literature, short fiction, poetry, travel chronicles, and literary and opinion columns for Chilean, Argentinean, American, and Spanish print and web media.

He maintains the blog Antípodas, which hosts a selection of his essays, fiction, and translation work.

== Bibliography ==
- La novela del corazón. Santiago, Chile: Laurel Editores, 2022. ISBN 9789569450860
- Muertes imaginarias. Santiago, Chile: Laurel Editores, 2020. Art by Andrea Goic. ISBN 9789569450587
- "The Laws of motion." in The Kenyon Review, May-June 2019.
- Wakefield. Santiago, Chile: Hueders Editores, 2019. ISBN 9789563651218
- Muriendo por la dulce patria mía. Santiago, Chile: Laurel Editores, 2017. ISBN 9789569450297
- Bartleby, el escribano. Una historia de Wall Street. Santiago, Chile: Hueders Editores, 2017. ISBN 9789563650464
- Antípodas. Ensayos y crónicas. Santiago: Chile, Cuarto Propio Editores, 2014. ISBN 9789562606660
- Muriendo por la dulce patria mía Santiago, Chile: Planeta, 1998. ISBN 956-247-195-0
