= Telecommunications in Chile =

The technical regulator of communications in Chile is the Ministry of Transportation and Telecommunications, through the Undersecretariat of Telecommunications (Subtel).

== Telephone ==
=== History ===
Telephone and telegraph services started in Chile in 1879, three years after Alexander Graham Bell, presented his patent for a telephonic system. José Dottin Husbands, an associate of Thomas Edison, arrived into the port of Valparaíso carrying the first set of switching equipment and telephones. By 1880 the first telephone company of the country is born (Compañía Chilena de Teléfonos de Edison), while in 1893, after a rapid expansion in the northern regions of Chile, telephone services started operating in the south, thanks to the founding of Telefónica del Sur (current day Grupo GTD), a company created by a group of German immigrants that had previously settled in the area of Valdivia, Región de los Ríos.

- Main lines in use: 2,567,938 (2020 est.)
- Mobile cellular: 25,068,249 (2020 est.)
  - Pre-paid: 17,283,257
  - Post-paid: 6,847,497
- System: privatization began in 1988; advanced telecommunications infrastructure; modern system based on extensive microwave radio relay facilities; fixed-line connections have dropped in recent years as mobile-cellular usage continues to increase, reaching a level of 85 telephones per 100 persons
  - Domestic: extensive microwave radio relay links; domestic satellite system with 3 earth stations
  - international: country code - 56; submarine cables provide links to the US and to Central and South America; satellite earth stations - 2 Intelsat (Atlantic Ocean) (2007)

== Radio ==
- Broadcast stations: 1,490 (175 AM; 1,315 FM) (2006)
- 88.5 MHz Radio Neura Arica
- 89.1 MHz FM Más
- 90.9 MHz Radio Estación
- 91.3 MHz Radio Canal 95 (Antofagasta)
- 92.1 MHz Radio Puerta Norte
- 93.1 MHz Radio Montecarmelo
- 93.5 MHz FM Plus (Antofagasta)
- 93.5 MHz Radio Primavera
- 94.9 MHz Frecuencia Tropical
- 95.9 MHz Radio Universidad de Tarapacá
- 96.5 MHz Radio Proclamación
- 98.9 MHz Presencia FM
- 100.1 MHz Radio Andina
- 104.9 MHz Cappíssima Multimedial
- 107.9 MHz Radio Alas de Águila

== Television ==
- Broadcast stations: 63 (plus 121 repeaters) (1997)
- Broadcast television system: NTSC
- Pay television: 4,158,874 (2012)

== Internet ==
- Internet hosts: 847,215 (2008)
- Internet users: 16,822,264 (2020 est.)
- Internet mobile users: 4,921,587
- Internet country code: .cl

== Other technical details ==
- Electricity: 220 volts AC, 50 Hz
