= Frei family =

The Frei family of Chile is formed by the descendants of Swiss Eduardo Frei Schlinz and Chilean Victoria Montalva Martínez. It became politically influential during the 20th century, and has played and still plays a significant role in Chilean politics. Its most prominent members are:

- Eduardo Frei Montalva (1911–1982), President of Chile 1964-1970, his wife María Ruiz-Tagle Jiménez, and their children Irene, Carmen, Isabel Margarita, Mónica, Eduardo, Jorge and Francisco Javier Frei Ruiz-Tagle. Among them:
  - Carmen Frei Ruiz-Tagle (b. 1938), Chilean politician, former senator
  - Eduardo Frei Ruiz-Tagle (b. 1942), President of Chile 1994–2000, his wife Marta Larraechea Bolívar, and their children Verónica, Cecilia, Magdalena and Catalina Frei Larraechea.
- Irene Frei Montalva (1916–1964)
- Arturo Frei Bolívar (1939–2022), nephew of Eduardo Frei Montalva, Chilean politician, presidential candidate in 1999, senator.

== See also ==
- History of Chile
