= Barrio Suecia =

Small neighborhood in Santiago, Chile known for nightlife and European architecture

Coordinates: 33°25′12″S 70°36′31″W

Barrio Suecia (Spanish for "Swedish neighborhood") is a section of Santiago, Chile, centered on Calle Suecia ("Sweden Street"), in the upscale Providencia municipality, which once included many pubs, discos and restaurants. Frequently the area is simply referred to as "Calle Suecia."

A commonly used pun is formed by changing the word Suecia to sucia, Spanish for "dirty", because the area is notorious for drunkenness and debauched nightlife.

Many venues on Calle Suecia have closed down since reaching its historic peak.
