= Fernando Solís (journalist) =

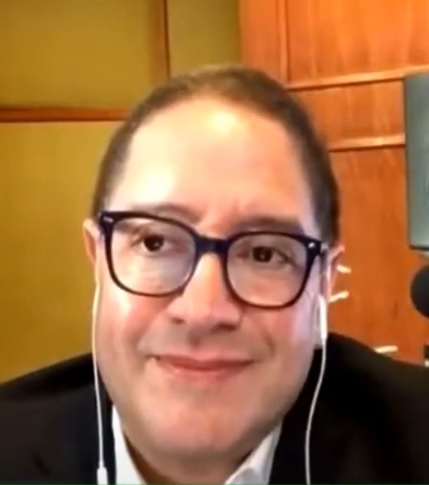
Fernando Solis

Fernando Solís Lara is a professional radio and TV host, born in Valdivia, Chile.

Internationally recognized for his work during more than 20 years in radio and television, Solís is the official voice of Canal 7 in Chile, TVN. He is also the voice of Sr. Manguera in the popular children's program 31 Minutos ("31 minutes") on TVN. His work transcended the national borders with his participation in the Latin American MTV Video Music Awards. He is also a host at Universal Channel, FM2 & ADN radios in Santiago and does many commercials.
