= Cruz del Tercer Milenio =

Monument cross in Coquimbo, Chile

Coordinates: 29°57′08″S 71°20′51″W

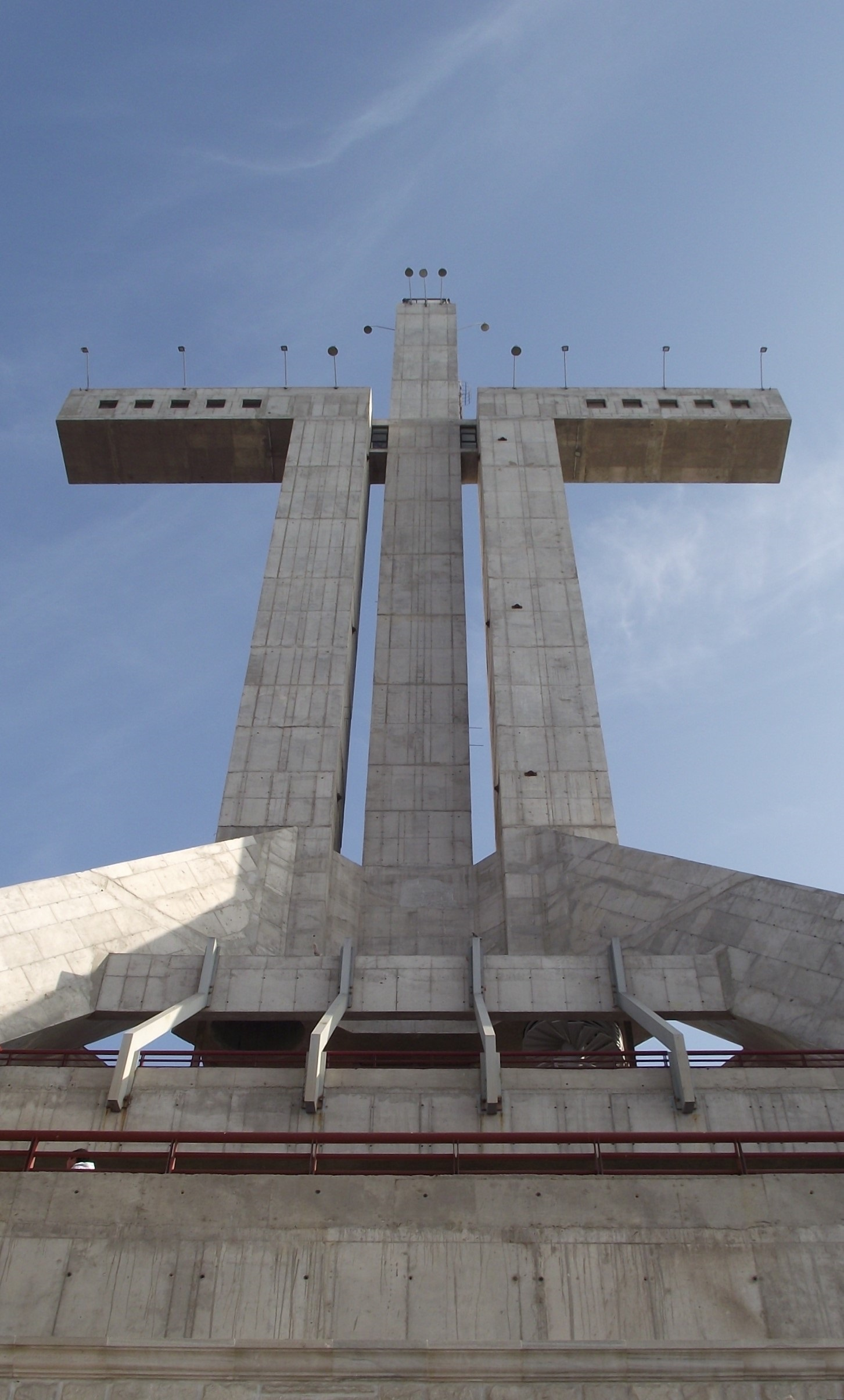
Cruz del Tercer Milenio

Cruz del Tercer Milenio (Spanish for "Third Millennium Cross") is an 83 meter tall, 40 meter wide, concrete cross located at the top of El Vigía hill in Coquimbo, Chile. Construction began in 1999 and it was completed in 2001. It sits 197 meters above sea level. It was considered the tallest monument in South America.
