= El Siglo (Chile) =

Chilean Communist Party newspaper

- Front page of El Siglo's 9–15 August 2013 edition. Front page of El Siglo's 9–15 August 2013 edition.
- Type: Weekly newspaper/magazine
- Format: Tabloid
- Owner: Communist Party of Chile
- Founded: 1940
- Headquarters: Santiago, Chile
- Website: www.elsiglo.cl

El Siglo (The Century) is a Chilean weekly newspaper, that is the official organ of the Central Committee of the Chilean Communist Party. The newspaper was founded on August 31, 1940.

On July 14, 1948, it was closed down as consequence of the anti-communist Defense of Democracy Law. From September 10, 1949, it was published clandestinely. On October 25, 1952, it was once again openly published. After the Chilean coup of 1973, it was once again closed down, although it was published clandestinely under Augusto Pinochet. In 1989 it became a weekly magazine.
