= Jéssica Eterovic =

Chilean model

Jéssica Miroslava Eterovic Pozas is a Chilean former model and beauty pageant titleholder who was crowned Miss World Chile 1993 and represented her country at the Miss World 1993 pageant in Sun City, South Africa where she was unplaced.

She is married to television producer Eduardo Dominguez.

Jessica Miroslava is of Croat origin.

Awards and achievements
Preceded by Paula Caballero	Miss World Chile; 1993	Succeeded by Yulissa Del Pino
