= Diego Barros =

Diego Barros may refer to:

- Diego Barros Arana (1830–1907), Chilean historian, politician and diplomat
- Diego Barros Ortiz (1908–1990), Chilean aviator, poet and politician
- Diego Barros (footballer), played for Club Atlético Nueva Chicago
