= Alejandro Silva (musician) =

- Origin: Santiago, Chile
- Genres: Speed metal, groove metal, power metal, Progressive Metal
- Occupations: Musician, songwriter
- Instruments: Guitar, bass
- Years active: 1999–present
- Label: Independent

Alejandro Silva is a Chilean instrumental heavy metal guitarist, best known as the founder and lead guitarist of his band, Alejandro Silva Power Cuarteto.

Silva started guitar when he was fourteen years old. Other musicians he has played with include Marty Friedman, Joe Satriani, Steve Vai, and Billy Sheehan, on the 2004 G3 tour held in Chile.

He is also a guitar teacher and a sound engineer.

== Discography ==
Year	Album	Label
1999	Alejandro Silva I	Independent
2002	Dios Eol	Independent
2003	ASPC Live	Independent
2007	Orden&Caos	Independent
2004	En Concierto	Independent
2008	Live2007	Independent
2014	"Solo Caos"	Independent
2024	"V"	Independent
