= Máximo Carvajal =

Chilean comic book artist (1935–2006)

Máximo Gorky Carvajal Belmar (October 6, 1935 – August 21, 2006) was a Chilean comic book artist.

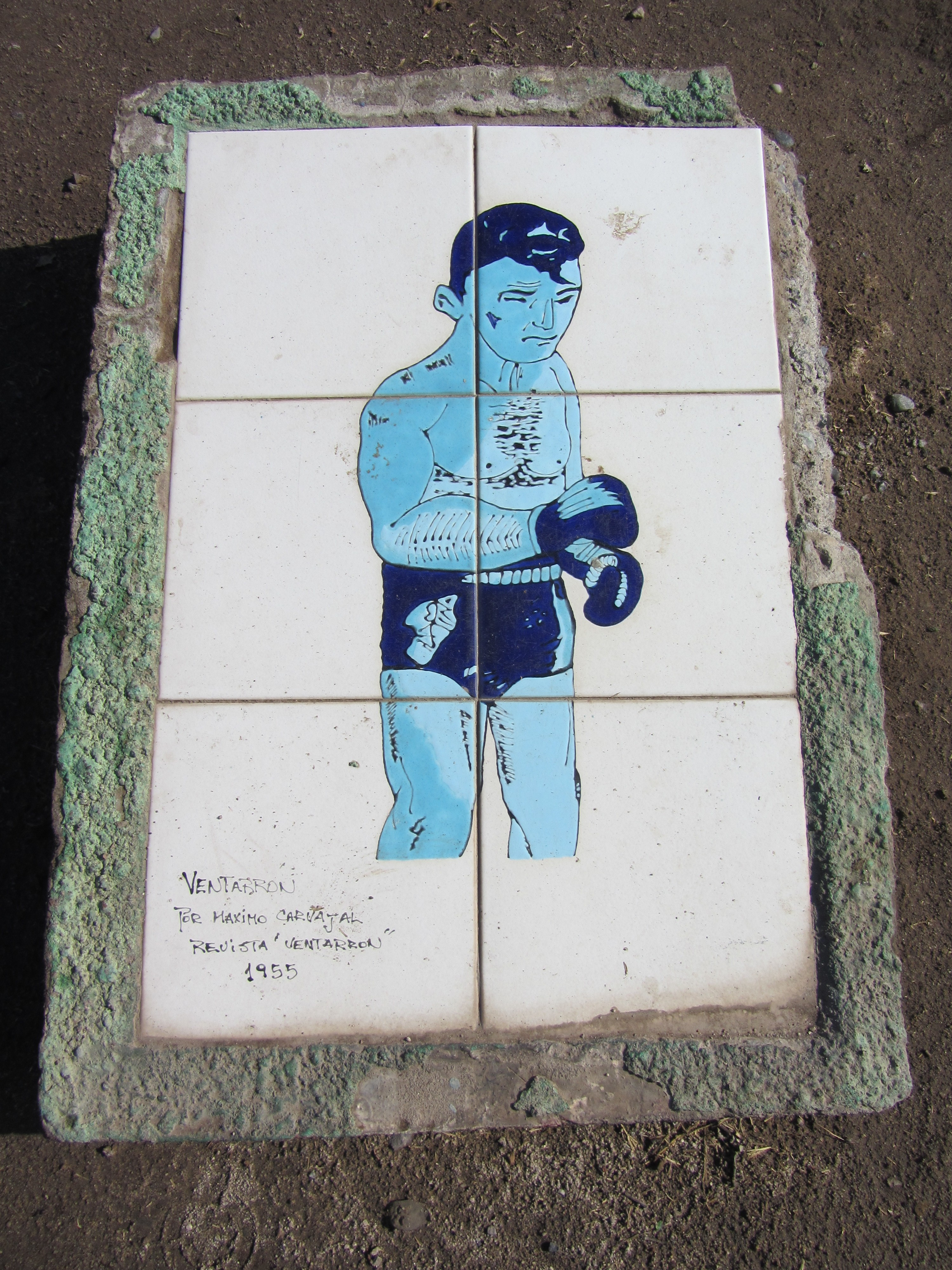

Carvajal was born in Valparaíso, Chile. He studied fine arts in Viña del Mar, later moving to Santiago to study applied arts. Carvajal worked in Chilean comics for nearly 50 years, creating the characters Dr. Mortis and Black Sloane.
