= Cordillera de Talinay =

Mountain range in Chile

Coordinates: 31.4833333°S 71.5666667°W

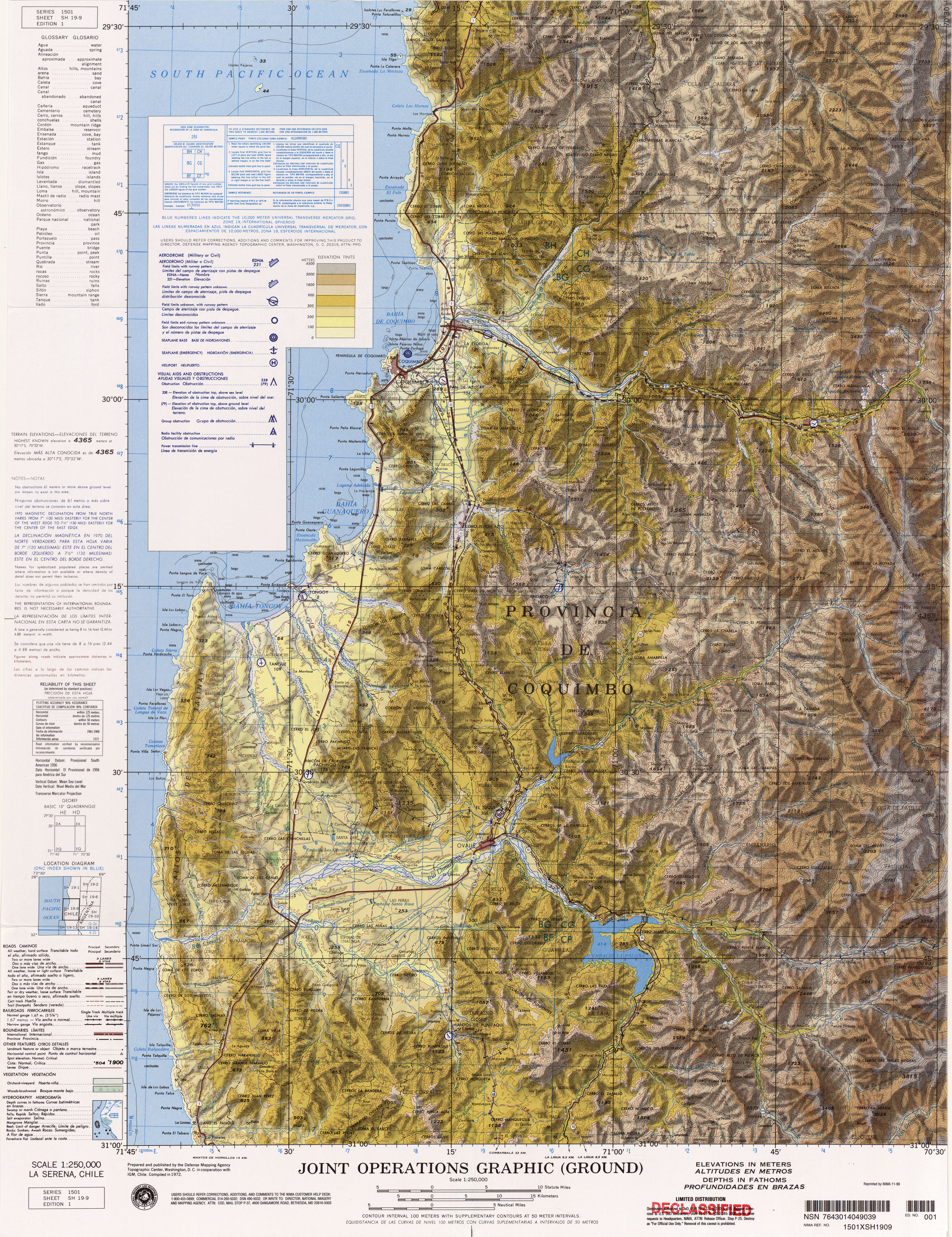
Cordillera de Talinay, south of Bahía Tongoy, (right and down)

The Cordillera de Talinay is a mountain range situated in the Coquimbo Region of Chile. The range consists of a series of hills and foothills spreading more than 40 km in a north–south direction from the coast, but which descend to meet the Limari river as it crosses Chile's Intermediate Depression (Depresión Intermedia or Valle Longitudinal (longitudinal valley)).

On Talinay mountain slopes can be found the city of Ovalle, capital of the Province of Limarí, several rich copper mines, such as the mine of Tamaya, and the Forest of Fray Jorge National Park (Parque Nacional Bosque Fray Jorge), which has been declared a World Biosphere Reserve by UNESCO. The Talinay's heights do not generally reach above 600 meters, although there exist certain exceptions, such as the "Guanaqueros Hill" (Cerro Guanaqueros) which is considerably taller than average.
