= CDtv =

Chilean legislative TV channel

Camara De Diputados Televisión
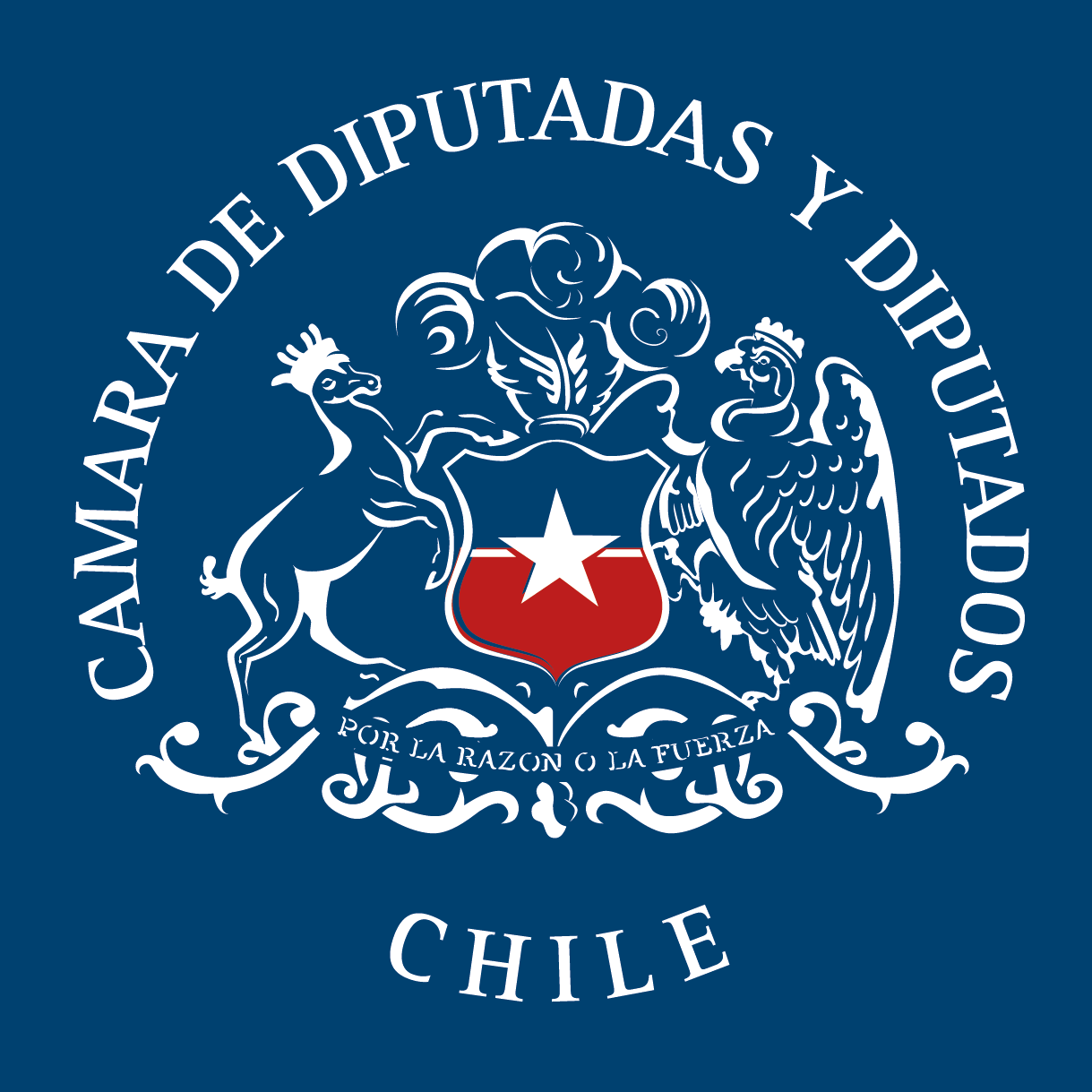
- Type: Pay TV public service broadcaster
- Country: Chile
- Headquarters: Avenida Pedro Montt s/n, Edificio del Congreso Nacional, Valparaíso, Chile

Programming
- Language: Spanish
- Picture format: 1080i HDTV (downscaled to 480i for the SDTV feed)

Ownership
- Owner: State of Chile

History
- Founded: 1 September 2000
- Launched: 1 September 2000

Links
- Website: www.cdtv.cl

Camara De Diputados Televisión or CDtv is a public owned cable TV channel in Chile.

CDtv broadcasts the sessions of the Chamber of Deputies of Chile live.

== See also ==
- List of Chilean television channels
