= SURES =

Fair trade organization

SURES (Red de Comercio Justo del Sur, South of Chile Fair Trade Network) is a Chilean association created in 2006 during the first Fair Trade Meetings, organized by the Chol-Chol Foundation and the AVINA Foundation. It is a network of small scale producer cooperatives of the Bio-Bio Region and the Araucanía Region, in the south of Chile.

Its mission is to enlighten south of Chile’s artisans and use fair trade as a tool to overcome poverty, so that they can live dignified lives from their work.

== Priorities ==
Producers associated with this network are mostly Mapuche women living within a poor family in the countryside. Selling their products brings them the main income of their home, which is a regular - and at least - minimum wage. SURES also works with urban artisans, the majority of them coming from Concepción.

For all members of SURES, Fair Trade ensures a direct relationship with marginalized producers, which is based on justice and dignity, and non-profit organizations play the part of “matchmaker” between these producers and responsible consumers.

== Key principles ==
- Defend and promote fair trade in the south of Chile
- Encourage democratic producers’ association
- Give value to the Person as much as to the product, thanks to a transparent marketing.

== Members ==
6 associations are part of SURES Network:

- Relmu Witral Native Association, made up of 120 Lavkenche women from Tirua, all traditional textile weavers.
- Ngen Cooperative, formed of 130 Mapuche women from Curarrehue who created 9 different workshops.
- The Chol-Chol Foundation supports almost 200 Mapuche craftswomen and craftsmen from the Araucanía Region.
- The Work for a Brother Foundation (TPH) enables artisans from Concepción to promote and sell their products.
- Hands of Bío Bío applies itself to creating a place dedicated to craftsmen who are excluded from the main distribution networks.
- Ñimi Kafé Pu Domo Native Association regroups 150 women weavers from 6 communities of the Araucanía Region.

== See also ==
- Fair Trade
- World Fair Trade Organization
- Mapuche
