= Manuel Negrete (shooting) =

Manuel Estanislao Negrete Hernández (1946 – 10 October 1973), was a Chilean man who was allegedly killed by policemen serving Chilean dictator Augusto Pinochet.

Negrete was a farm worker who worked on plantation fields and had experience with plants, fruits and vegetables. He married a local girl in his town, the city of Curico. In a case that would later on make headline news in Chile, Negrete was killed and two others were injured during a shooting on September 19 of that year. According to eyewitnesses, on 19 September 1973, Negrete was drinking with some friends at a bar in Sagrada Familia. A fight broke out at the scene, prompting three arriving men (possibly police officers) to start shooting. According to records that were discovered after Pinochet regime ended, three gunmen entered the bar after the argument had spilled into a fist fight and started firing shots, injuring Negrete. Negrete ran to the back of the bar, finding a door that led him outside the store. Thinking that he could get away from the chaos without further injury, Negrete was surprised to find policemen there. They began to shoot him, hitting him several times, specifically in the brain and thorax.

Negrete was taken by friends to a hospital in Curico following the shooting. He remained hospitalized there in intensive care for 21 days before dying from sepsis on 10 October 1973. Medical records, also disclosed publicly after Pinochet left the presidency, showed that Negrete may have survived had it not been for one specific bullet wound between his thorax and his brain. That specific wound caused his blood to become poisoned, and he died of sepsis.
