= Lorenzo de Arrau =

Spanish military engineer

- Born: 1735; Barcelona, Spain
- Died: 1781 (aged 45–46); Chillán, Chile
- Military career
- Allegiance: Kingdom of Spain
- Rank: Military engineer

Lorenzo de Arrau (1740–1781) was a Spanish military engineer who served in Chile during the second half of the 18th century.

== Biography ==
Arrau (Catalan: Llorenç d'Arrau) was born in Barcelona in 1740.

He was sent to the Spanish colony of Chile by King Carlos III to work as a military engineer. De Arrau arrived in Chile in 1763, accompanying Juan Garland and Ambrosio O'Higgins (future Marquis of Osorno and Viceroy of Perú and father of Bernardo O'Higgins, the father of the Chilean independence). He served in Valdivia in 1764, and in Santiago where he established an arsenal for the manufacture of cannons.

He married Isabel de Santa María Escobedo y Baeza, and they had six children: Juan (single), Pedro Juan (a down-to-earth rancher and an ancestor of pianist Claudio Arrau), Clara, Juana, Cruz, and Manuela Bárbara (nun).

He died in 1781 in Chillán, Chile.

His son Pedro Juan de Arrau y Santa Maria married Carmen Darroch del Solar, a descendant of Reverend John Darroch (who descended from the Campbells of Craignish, Scotland) and his wife Elspeth Campbell (of the Campbells of Glenorchy, Scotland).

Lorenzo de Arrau y Alguer-Suari belonged to a family of painters and artists from Barcelona famous since the 17th century. The origins of the Arraus can be found in Barcelona and, further, in France. One of his descendants is the Chilean pianist Claudio Arrau.

== Citations and sources ==
=== Sources ===
- Manent, Albert (1992). Comissió Amèrica (ed.). Diccionari dels catalans d'Amèrica [Dictionary of Catalans of America] (in Catalan). Vol. 1. Barcelona: Generalitat de Catalunya. ISBN 9788472569812.
