= Carolina Aguilera =

Chilean journalist

Carolina Aguilera is a Chilean journalist who lives in New York City.

Carolina Aguilera's first book was published by Planeta in September 2002. Our Heroes profiles the Latino firemen who died on September 11, 2001. This was the first time that Planeta, the largest of the Spanish-language publishers, released a book in English. The book was also published in Spanish, under the title Nuestros Héroes. It was selected by Críticas magazine as one of the best Spanish-language books of 2002.

Her play, In the Shadow of the Lighthouse, premiered at the Gallery Players Black Box Festival in June 2009.

== Bibliography ==
- Our Heroes (2002)
- In the Shadow of the Lighthouse (2009)
