= People's Revolutionary Party (Chile) =

Chilean political party

People's Revolutionary Party (Spanish: Partido Revolucionario del Pueblo) is a small political party in Chile. The group has its origins in the Revolutionary Left Movement (Movimiento de Izquierda Revolucionaria or MIR).

== See also ==
- List of political parties in Chile
