= Unidad Anti-Terrorista =

The Chilean Counter-Terrorism Unit (Spanish: Unidad Anti-Terrorista) or UAT is a tactical unit of the Chilean Air Force designated to handle terrorist threats. Operationally it is under the direction of the Ministry of the Interior. It is based at Tobolaba Airport in Santiago. It is considered the leading anti-terrorist unit in the country and consists of 120 members working in 7-man teams.
