= Chilean ship Almirante Lynch =

Several ships of the Chilean Navy have been named Almirante Lynch after Patricio Lynch (1824–1886), a Chilean hero during the War of the Pacific

- Chilean torpedo gunboat Almirante Lynch, a Almirante Lynch-class torpedo gunboat, launched in 1890, and decommissioned in 1919
- Chilean destroyer Almirante Lynch, lead ship of her class of destroyers, launched in 1912, and decommissioned in 1945
- Chilean frigate Almirante Lynch (PFG-07), a Condell-class frigate, launched in 1972, decommissioned in 2007, and sold to Ecuador in 2008
- Chilean frigate Almirante Lynch (FF-07), a Type 23 frigate, the former HMS Grafton (F80), commissioned into the Chilean Navy in 2007
