= Jorge Urrutia =

Jorge Urrutia Blondel (September 17, 1905 – July 5, 1981), was a Chilean composer, educator and writer, born in 1905. He has composed ballet music, symphonic poems, and works for piano and for voice. He is regarded as a Chilean nationalist in his music, but nevertheless the influence of Claude Debussy and Maurice Ravel can be detected in his orchestration and harmony. He co-authored, with S. Claro, Historia de la musica en Chile (History of Music in Chile), published in 1971.

== Works ==
- "Tres canciones campesinas de Chile"
