= Humberto Nilo =

Chilean academic

Humberto Nilo Saavedra (born in Santiago de Chile in 1954) was the director of the University of Chile school of arts. He set up a mail art exhibit at a museum in Santiago. The exhibit criticized the lack of liberty in Chile. He was dismissed a few months later.
