= La Prensa (Curicó) =

- Front page of La Prensa's 9 September 2013 edition. Front page of La Prensa's 9 September 2013 edition.
- Type: Daily newspaper
- Format: Tabloid
- Owner: Empresa Periodística Curicó Ltda.
- Editor: Manuel Massa Mautino
- Founded: 1898
- Headquarters: Curicó, Chile
- Website: www.diariolaprensa.cl

La Prensa de Curicó (Spanish: "The Press"), is a daily newspaper published in Curicó and owned by Empresa Periodística Curicó LTDA. The headquarters is located in Sargento Aldea 632 Curicó, Chile. The newspaper was founded on November 13, 1898.

== History ==
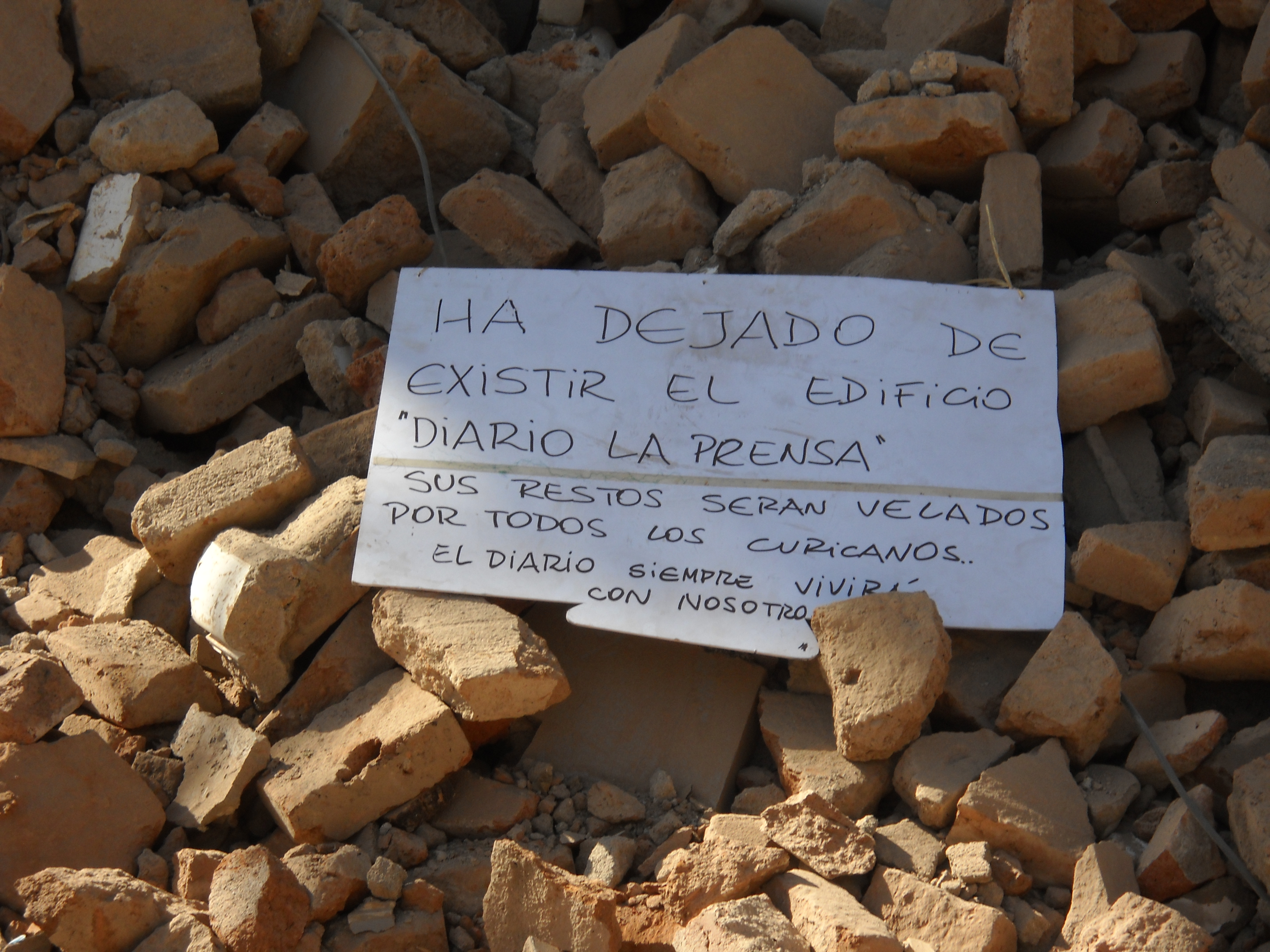
Debris of the newspaper’s headquarters after the 2010 Chile earthquake.

It was founded in 1886, and in its first period it circulated until 1890. In 1898, the Morán Aliaga family revived the idea and re-launched the newspaper. Initially, it focused on classified advertising and notices, but later expanded into other areas of journalism.

In 1998, it established an office in the city of Talca with the aim of expanding coverage throughout the Maule Region. On May 28, 2001, La Prensa began circulating officially across the region’s four provinces.

Its headquarters in Curicó were completely destroyed after the 2010 Chile earthquake, due to the collapse of one of its façades. La Prensa did not circulate for five days, resuming publication on Thursday, March 4, with an edition whose front page showed the destruction suffered by the company’s headquarters.

After the earthquake, the offices of ''La Prensa'' were relocated to Sargento Aldea Street 632, pending the reconstruction of the main headquarters on Merced Street.

== Supplements ==
On Mondays, the newspaper publishes La Prensa Agrícola, which reports on the latest trends in agricultural production in the region, Chile, and the world, as well as recent technological advances in the sector.

On Sundays, the weekly supplement ''Domingo en Familia'' is published, featuring various reports and a magazine. In addition, special editions are released for important national or regional events, such as municipal anniversaries or notable local figures.
