= Paulina Mladinic =

Paulina Mladinic Zorzano (born c. 1980) is a Chilean model and beauty pageant titleholder who was the Chilean delegate for Miss World in 1997. Paulina is of Croatian and Basque descent.

Awards and achievements
| Preceded by Luz Francisca Valenzuela | Miss World Chile; 1997 | Succeeded by Daniella Campos |
