= TVU (Chilean TV channel) =

Televisión Universidad de Concepción
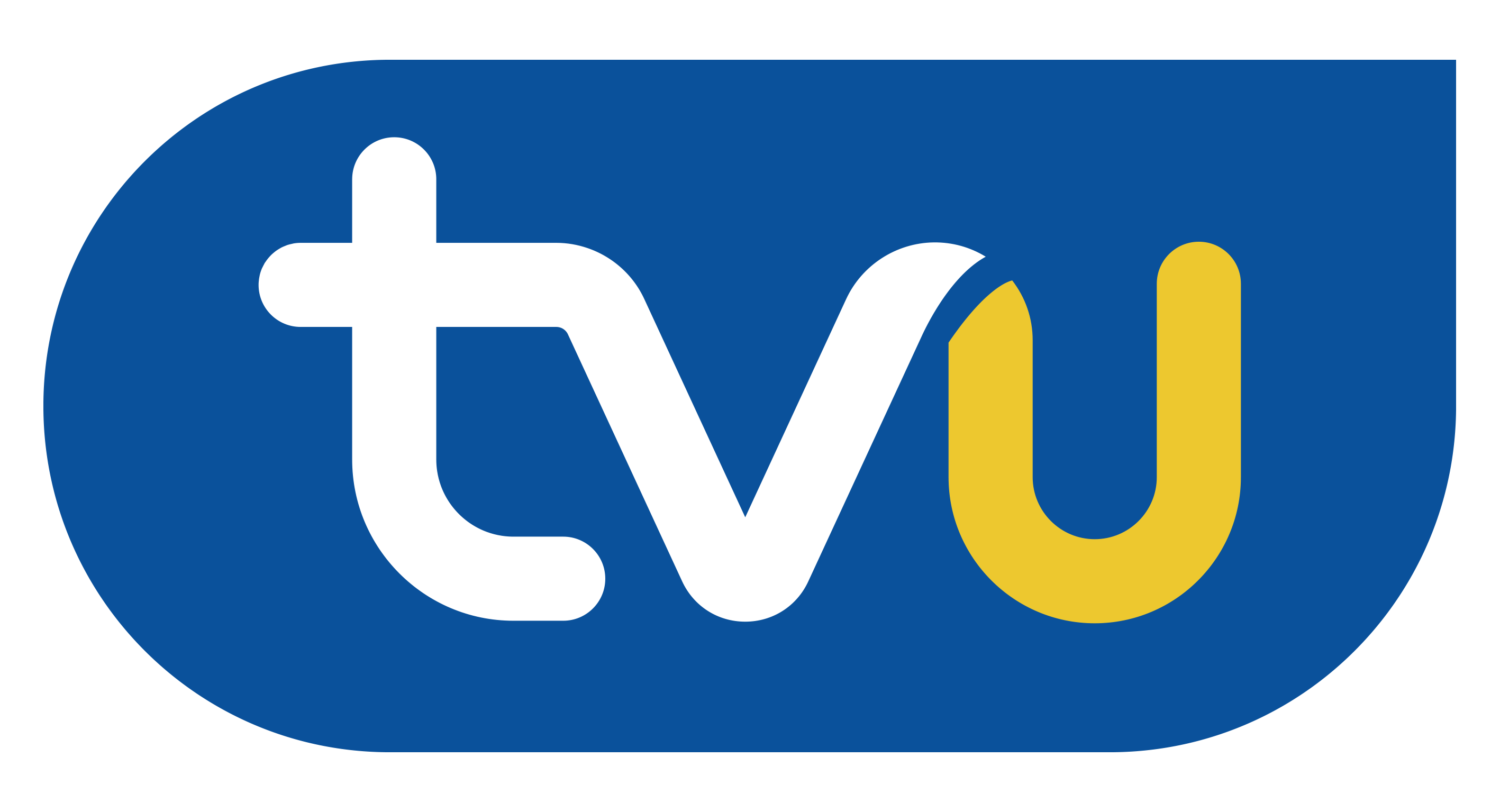

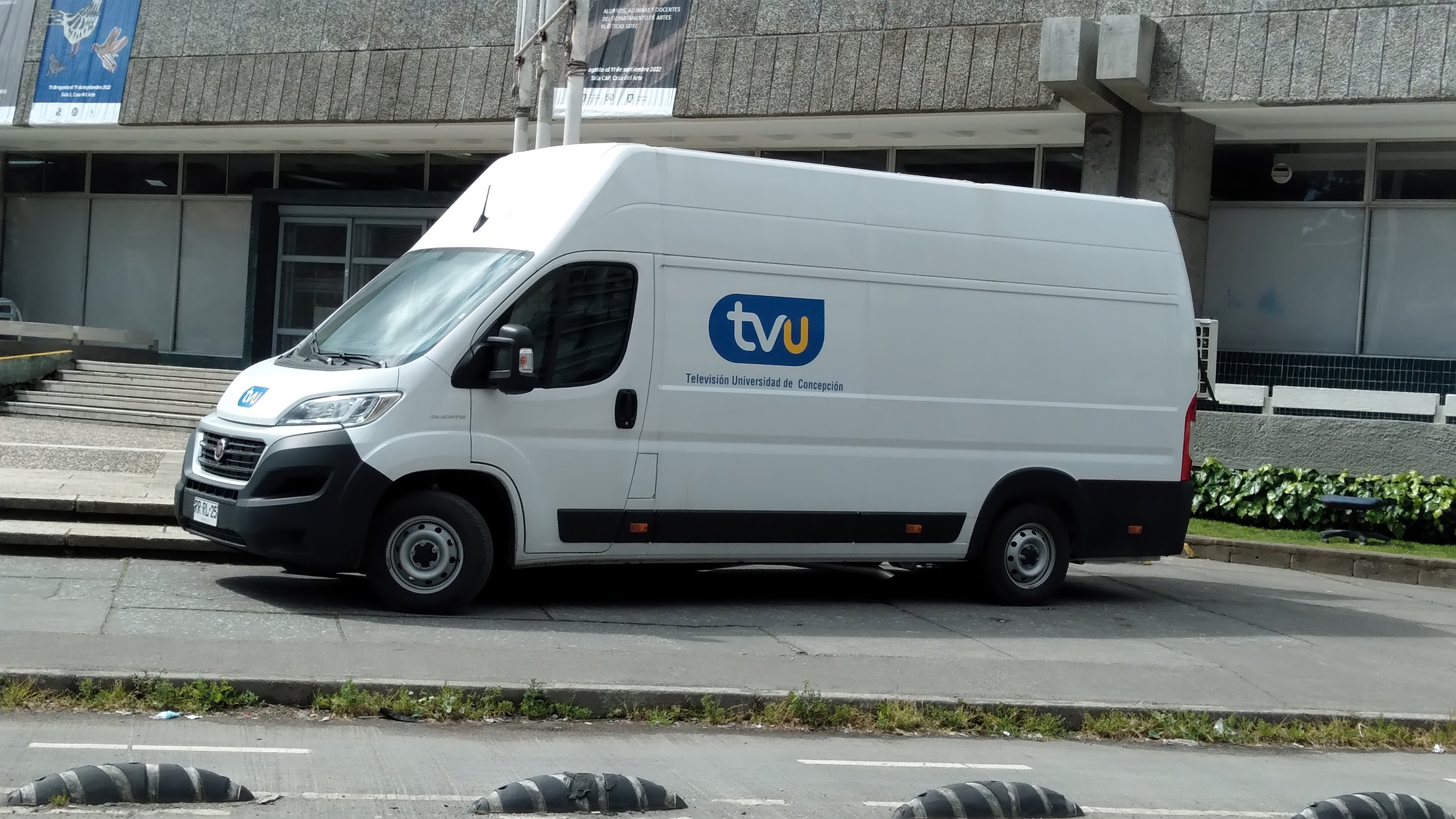
- Country: Chile
- Broadcast area: Regional: Chillán; Concepción; Temuco; Valdivia; Puerto Montt

Programming
- Language: Spanish

Ownership
- Owner: Holding Octava Comunicaciones S.A.

History
- Launched: 4 April 1997

Links
- Website: tvu.cl

Availability

Terrestrial
- VHF: Channel 11 (Concepción, Chile)

Televisión Universidad de Concepción, TVU, is a television channel of Chile. It currently airs in Concepción on VHF channel 11. Its headquarters are in Concepción, Chile, in the Universidad de Concepción.

TVU mostly aired documentaries and some low budget entertainment television shows.

== Logos ==
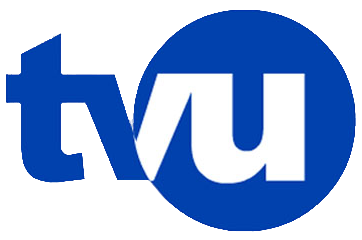
2002-2016

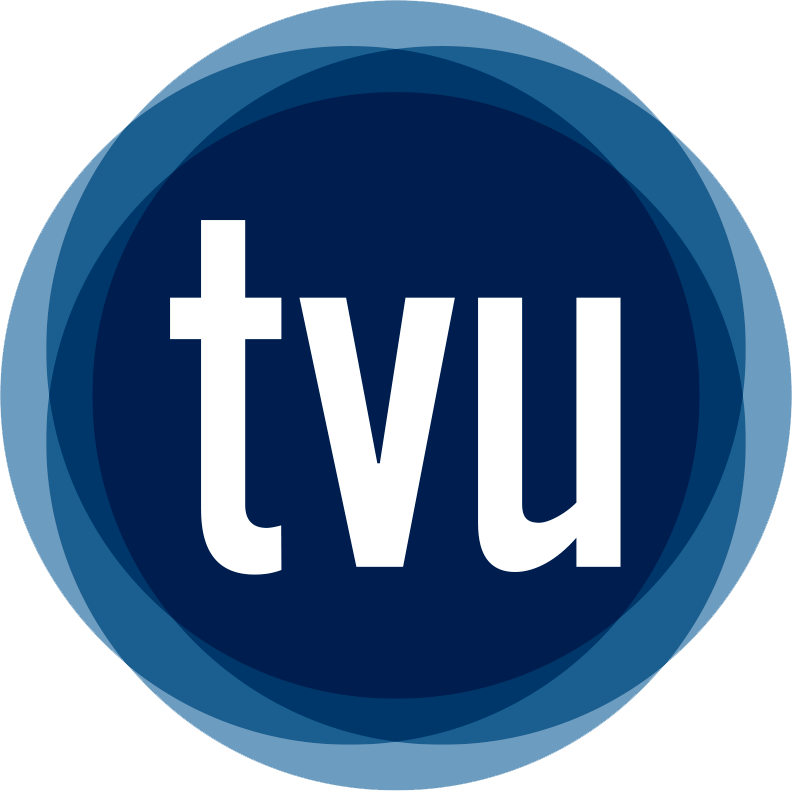
2016-2021

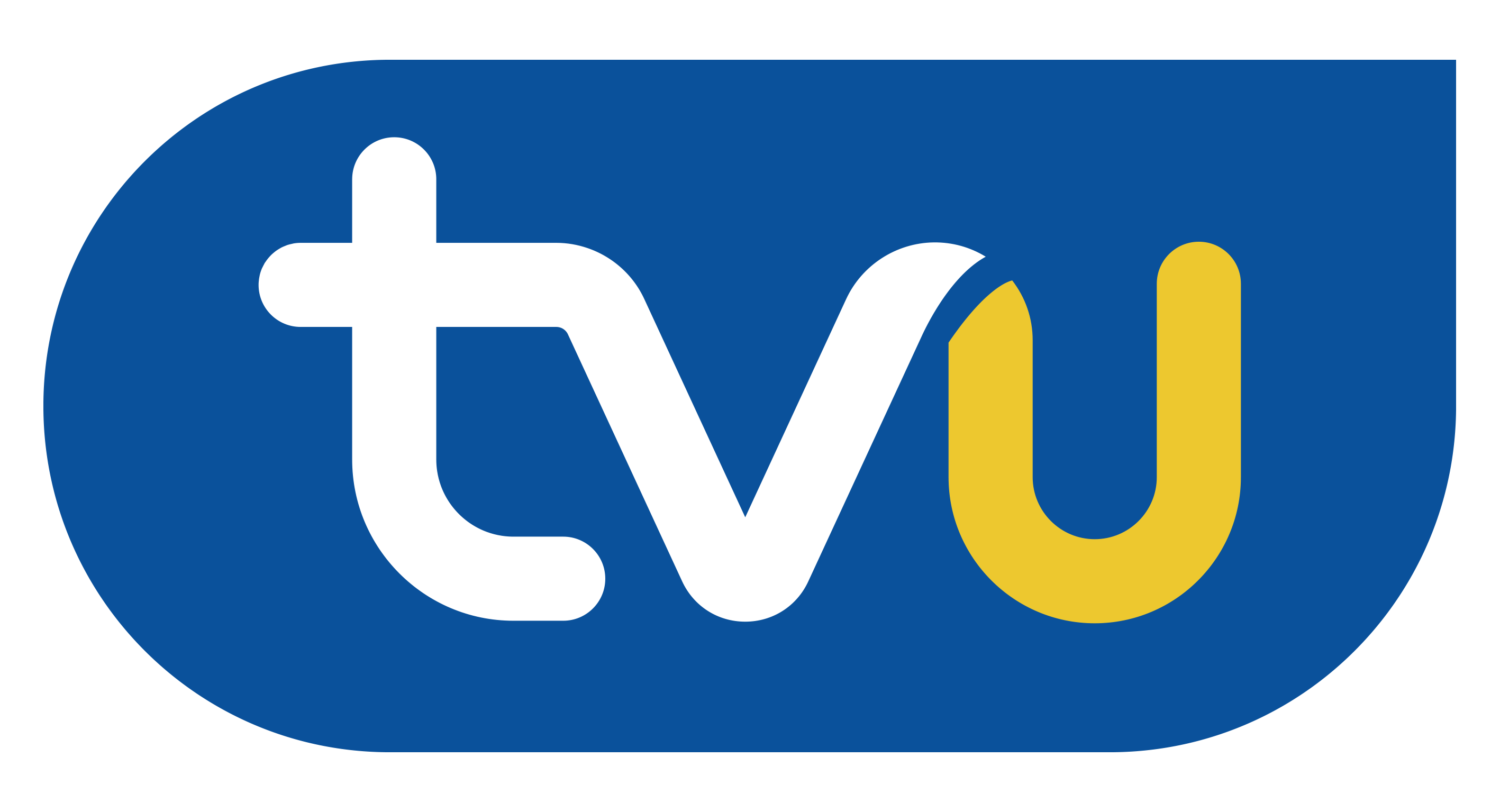
2021-now
