= Carlos Kaiser (activist) =

Chilean disability advocate (born 1974)

Carlos Kaiser (born in Santiago in 1974) is a Chilean campaigner on issues affecting people with disabilities. He has an amputated upper and lower limbs. In 2001 Kaiser presented a section of the young people's television programme Mekano, called "being a person with disability in Chile".

== Overview ==
Kaiser belonged to a team of disabled people that helped the Chilean government to improve the national law concerning disability issues. In 2003 he received a scholarship to work at the Japan International Cooperation Agency. There, he learned about various ways in which to improve the situation of disabled people in Chile, as well as learning about Independent Living concepts from the Mexican Ignacio González Saravia. Upon his return to Chile, Kaiser created Independent Living Chile. In 2003 he married Carla Salinas, a well-known social worker. Kaiser later served as an expert in a commission created by the UN to establish an international agreement ensuring the rights of people with disabilities.

In 2004 he was named as one of the 100 most promising Chilean young leaders by the El Mercurio newspaper's El Sábado magazine. In 2005 he created the Municipal Office for People with Disabilities' Affairs in Algarrobo, a seaside town in central Chile. In 2005, the Office won a national award for its work; in the same year, Independent Living Chile received funds for one year of independent living training.

In 2006, former President of Chile Michelle Bachelet appointed Kaiser as the new national director of the National Fund for Disabilities.
