= District 18 (Chamber of Deputies of Chile) =

Electoral district of the Chamber of Deputies of Chile

- Distrito 18
- Electoral District for the Chamber of Deputies
- Location of District 18 within Chile
- Commune: List: Cauquenes; Chanco; Colbún; Linares; Longaví; Parral; Pelluhue; Retiro; San Javier; Villa Alegre; Yerbas Buenas
- Region: Maule
- Population: 343,301 (2017)
- Electorate: 307,618 (2021)
- Area: 13,097 km^{2} (2020)

Current Electoral District
- Created: 2017
- Seats: 4 (2017–present)
- Deputies: List: Gustavo Benavente (UDI); Paula Labra (Ind); Jaime Naranjo (PS); Consuelo Veloso (Ind)

District 18 (Spanish: Distrito 18) is one of the 28 multi-member electoral districts of the Chamber of Deputies, the lower house of the National Congress, the national legislature of Chile. The district was created by the 2015 electoral reform and came into being at the following general election in 2017. It consists of the communes of Cauquenes, Chanco, Colbún, Linares, Longaví, Parral, Pelluhue, Retiro, San Javier, Villa Alegre and Yerbas Buenas in the region of Maule. The district currently elects four of the 155 members of the Chamber of Deputies using the open party-list proportional representation electoral system. At the 2021 general election the district had 307,618 registered electors.

== Electoral system ==
District 18 currently elects four of the 155 members of the Chamber of Deputies using the open party-list proportional representation electoral system. Parties may form electoral pacts with each other to pool their votes and increase their chances of winning seats. However, the number of candidates nominated by an electoral pact may not exceed the maximum number of candidates that a single party may nominate. Seats are allocated using the D'Hondt method.

== Election results ==
=== Summary ===
Election	Apruebo Dignidad AD / FA			Dignidad Ahora DA			New Social Pact NPS / NM			Democratic Convergence CD			Chile Vamos Podemos / Vamos			Party of the People PDG			Christian Social Front FSC		
Election	Votes	%	Seats	Votes	%	Seats	Votes	%	Seats	Votes	%	Seats	Votes	%	Seats	Votes	%	Seats	Votes	%	Seats
2021	18,208	15.44%	1	2,549	2.16%	0	27,890	23.65%	1				40,417	34.28%	2	5,419	4.60%	0	8,253	7.00%	0
2017	7,441	6.17%	0				26,247	21.77%	1	30,286	25.12%	1	47,876	39.70%	2						

=== Detailed ===
==== 2021 ====
Results of the 2021 general election held on 21 November 2021:

Party		Pact	Party														Pact		
Party		Pact	Votes per commune											Total votes	%	Seats	Votes	%	Seats
Party		Pact	Cauqu- enes	Chanco	Colbún	Linares	Lon- gaví	Parral	Pellu- hue	Retiro	San Javier	Villa Alegre	Yerbas Buenas	Total votes	%	Seats	Votes	%	Seats
National Renewal	RN	Chile Podemos +	1,289	398	572	7,668	819	6,059	309	3,001	1,606	591	758	23,070	19.56%	1	40,417	34.28%	2
Independent Democratic Union	UDI	Chile Podemos +	820	272	410	4,445	3,789	1,672	267	489	2,357	965	585	16,071	13.63%	1	40,417	34.28%	2
Evópoli	EVO	Chile Podemos +	123	43	36	181	86	149	51	62	253	230	62	1,276	1.08%	0	40,417	34.28%	2
Socialist Party of Chile	PS	New Social Pact	1,408	311	913	3,840	1,188	2,003	225	710	3,058	1,181	1,162	15,999	13.57%	1	27,890	23.65%	1
Christian Democratic Party	PDC	New Social Pact	443	155	3,641	3,155	467	536	154	447	1,088	309	1,092	11,487	9.74%	0	27,890	23.65%	1
Radical Party of Chile	PR	New Social Pact	61	33	17	64	31	41	20	16	59	36	26	404	0.34%	0	27,890	23.65%	1
Democratic Revolution	RD	Apruebo Dignidad	3,531	640	292	2,863	498	1,073	1,260	356	1,264	390	332	12,499	10.60%	1	18,208	15.44%	1
Communist Party of Chile	PC	Apruebo Dignidad	263	69	293	2,668	406	335	117	158	597	192	187	5,285	4.48%	0	18,208	15.44%	1
Social Green Regionalist Federation	FREVS	Apruebo Dignidad	36	17	21	86	26	59	50	20	65	21	23	424	0.36%	0	18,208	15.44%	1
Republican Party	REP	Christian Social Front	1,026	243	316	2,642	448	803	368	323	1,227	376	481	8,253	7.00%	0	8,253	7.00%	0
United Centre	CU	United Independents	3,829	199	119	389	218	283	299	116	266	120	79	5,917	5.02%	0	5,917	5.02%	0
Party of the People	PDG		489	126	228	1,831	402	519	130	235	980	231	248	5,419	4.60%	0	5,419	4.60%	0
Paula Nuche Garrido (Independent)	Ind		205	40	114	2,834	333	353	70	147	272	126	361	4,855	4.12%	0	4,855	4.12%	0
Felipe Gonzalez Lopez (Independent)	Ind		340	91	122	1,257	282	375	78	149	424	183	169	3,470	2.94%	0	3,470	2.94%	0
Humanist Party	PH	Dignidad Ahora	125	43	48	226	85	151	32	78	230	212	56	1,286	1.09%	0	2,549	2.16%	0
Equality Party	IGUAL	Dignidad Ahora	74	42	31	109	62	676	27	81	93	36	32	1,263	1.07%	0	2,549	2.16%	0
Progressive Party	PRO		123	53	40	192	81	114	50	51	149	41	43	937	0.79%	0	937	0.79%	0
Valid votes			14,185	2,775	7,213	34,450	9,221	15,201	3,507	6,439	13,988	5,240	5,696	117,915	100.00%	4	117,915	100.00%	4
Blank votes			1,077	601	273	1,356	634	1,042	418	626	1,271	447	453	8,198	6.23%				
Rejected votes – other			669	279	233	1,310	363	709	199	300	847	279	291	5,479	4.16%				
Total polled			15,931	3,655	7,719	37,116	10,218	16,952	4,124	7,365	16,106	5,966	6,440	131,592	42.78%				
Registered electors			37,684	9,369	18,716	82,252	27,055	38,210	7,912	17,799	39,506	14,020	15,095	307,618					
Turnout			42.28%	39.01%	41.24%	45.12%	37.77%	44.37%	52.12%	41.38%	40.77%	42.55%	42.66%	42.78%					

The following candidates were elected: Gustavo Benavente (UDI), 8,114 votes; Paula Labra (RN), 13,044 votes; Jaime Naranjo (PS), 15,023 votes; and Consuelo Veloso (RD), 8,903 votes.

==== 2017 ====
Results of the 2017 general election held on 19 November 2017:

Party		Pact	Party														Pact		
Party		Pact	Votes per commune											Total votes	%	Seats	Votes	%	Seats
Party		Pact	Cauqu- enes	Chanco	Colbún	Linares	Lon- gaví	Parral	Pellu- hue	Retiro	San Javier	Villa Alegre	Yerbas Buenas	Total votes	%	Seats	Votes	%	Seats
Independent Democratic Union	UDI	Chile Vamos	2,939	899	1,228	11,238	3,419	6,167	706	2,263	2,962	1,270	1,363	34,454	28.57%	2	47,876	39.70%	2
National Renewal	RN	Chile Vamos	3,435	571	417	2,768	530	936	376	1,023	2,271	633	462	13,422	11.13%	0	47,876	39.70%	2
Christian Democratic Party	PDC	Democratic Convergence	3,319	877	3,508	9,133	1,919	2,451	823	1,194	3,898	1,555	1,609	30,286	25.12%	1	30,286	25.12%	1
Socialist Party of Chile	PS	Nueva Mayoría	826	387	1,156	3,185	756	1,306	125	642	2,851	1,096	1,060	13,390	11.10%	1	26,247	21.77%	1
Party for Democracy	PPD	Nueva Mayoría	915	298	217	829	1,069	3,291	345	1,212	509	184	180	9,049	7.50%	0	26,247	21.77%	1
Social Democrat Radical Party	PRSD	Nueva Mayoría	1,275	66	123	1,001	184	117	118	32	215	135	542	3,808	3.16%	0	26,247	21.77%	1
Democratic Revolution	RD	Broad Front	550	113	218	1,845	299	431	122	143	559	186	152	4,618	3.83%	0	7,441	6.17%	0
Humanist Party	PH	Broad Front	291	71	138	834	192	253	79	118	580	146	121	2,823	2.34%	0	7,441	6.17%	0
Citizens	CIU	Sumemos	1,056	162	283	821	809	296	428	154	421	115	188	4,733	3.92%	0	4,733	3.92%	0
Progressive Party	PRO	All Over Chile	443	195	204	777	353	366	110	202	510	189	195	3,544	2.94%	0	4,003	3.32%	0
País	PAIS	All Over Chile	79	21	19	100	40	50	10	18	60	30	32	459	0.38%	0	4,003	3.32%	0
Valid votes			15,128	3,660	7,511	32,531	9,570	15,664	3,242	7,001	14,836	5,539	5,904	120,586	100.00%	4	120,586	100.00%	4
Blank votes			1,277	524	762	1,705	865	866	284	642	1,421	490	519	9,355	6.88%				
Rejected votes – other			812	264	349	1,486	498	679	126	322	834	288	313	5,971	4.39%				
Total polled			17,217	4,448	8,622	35,722	10,933	17,209	3,652	7,965	17,091	6,317	6,736	135,912	46.16%				
Registered electors			37,336	9,193	17,015	80,185	25,681	37,035	6,851	16,427	37,641	13,069	13,995	294,428					
Turnout			46.11%	48.38%	50.67%	44.55%	42.57%	46.47%	53.31%	48.49%	45.41%	48.34%	48.13%	46.16%					

The following candidates were elected: Manuel Matta (PDC), 12,825 votes; Jaime Naranjo (PS), 13,390 votes; Rolando Rentería (UDI), 16,715 votes; and Ignacio Urrutia (UDI), 17,739 votes.
