= Manuel Matta Aragay =

Chilean politician

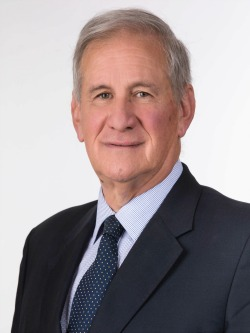

Member of the Chamber of Deputies
- In office 11 March 2018 – 11 March 2022
- Constituency: District 18
- In office 11 March 1990 – 11 March 1994
- Preceded by: Creation of the district
- Succeeded by: Guillermo Ceroni
- Constituency: 40th District

Member of the Senate of Chile
- In office 11 March 2014 – 11 March 2018
- Preceded by: Ximena Rincón
- Succeeded by: Dissolution of the charge
- Constituency: 11th Circunscription
- In office 11 March 1994 – 11 March 2002
- Preceded by: Mario Papi
- Succeeded by: Jaime Naranjo

Ambassador of Chile to El Salvador
- In office 11 March 2006 – 11 March 2010
- President: Michelle Bachelet
- Preceded by: Victoria Morales Etchevers
- Succeeded by: José Renato Sepúlveda

Ambassador of Chile to Portugal
- In office 2003 – 11 March 2006
- President: Ricardo Lagos
- Preceded by: Belisario Velasco
- Succeeded by: Francisco Pérez Walker

Personal details
- Born: 10 November 1946 (age 79) Talca, Chile
- Party: Christian Democratic Party
- Spouse: Isabel Aylwin Oyarzún
- Children: Three
- Education: University of Chile (LL.B)
- Occupation: Politician
- Profession: Lawyer

Manuel José Ramón Matta Aragay (born 10 November 1946) is a Chilean politician, militant from Christian Democratic Party.

Over several decades, he has alternated between legislative and diplomatic responsibilities, serving both in Congress and abroad as ambassador. His career reflects the long trajectory of a centrist politician advocated to social, rural, and institutional issues.

Educated at the University of Chile, Matta began his public life during the 1970s and later held seats in both chambers of Parliament. His work has centered on agricultural policy, rural development, and regional representation, with particular attention to the Maule Region area.

After serving as senator and ambassador, he returned to the Chamber of Deputies for the 2018–2022 term, continuing his involvement in matters related to social equity and the modernization of Chile’s countryside.

== Biography ==
He studied at the Internado Nacional Barros Arana, where he was elected president of the Student Center. He then entered the Faculty of Law of the University of Chile, where he obtained his law degree. He joined the Democracia Cristiana Universitaria (DC) (University Christian Democracy), becoming its National Vice President in 1973.

He worked as an advisor to the National Union of Trade Union Organizations of the National Foundation for Rural Development Projects of the Archbishopric of Santiago; and to the national peasant confederations Libertad, Triunfo Campesino, and Sargento Candelaria.

Matta served as chief lawyer of the Legal Department of Agra Ltda., the former peasant department of the Vicariate of Solidarity. He was also a law professor at the Institute of Christian Humanism and at the Diego Portales University.

== Political career ==
He was elected deputy for District 40, which includes Longaví, Retiro, Parral, Cauquenes, Pelluhue, and Chanco. He served on the Standing Committee on Health and the Committee on Agriculture, Rural and Maritime Development, and was a member of the Special Committee on Congressional Property.

In the 1993 parliamentary elections, he was elected senator for Constituency 11 (Southern Maule) for the 1994–2002 term. He served on the Standing Committees on Economy and Agriculture, chairing the latter in 1998. He ran for re-election but was defeated by Socialist senator Jaime Naranjo.

After leaving Parliament, Matta served in the diplomatic field as Ambassador to Portugal (2003–2006) and to El Salvador (2006–2010).

In 2013 he ran again as a candidate for deputy for District 40 but was not elected. In April 2014, he ran as a candidate in the primary elections organized by the PDC to determine the replacement for Ximena Rincón, who had taken office as a minister of state, in the Senate seat for Constituency XI (Southern Maule), winning with 47.94 percent of the vote. He took office as senator on May 7 of that same year.

From 2018 to 2022, Matta served as a deputy representing District 18, which includes the provinces of Cauquenes, Linares, and Curicó in the Maule Region. During his term, he focused on issues related to rural development, agricultural modernization, and the protection of small farmers, maintaining a strong connection with his district’s local communities.

He also participated actively in legislative debates on social welfare, environmental protection, and regional equity, emphasizing the importance of decentralization and public investment in the country’s southern territories. His tenure was characterized by a pragmatic approach.
