= Ignacio Urrutia =

Chilean politician (born 1957)

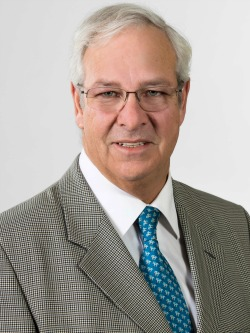

Member of the Senate
- Incumbent
- Assumed office 11 March 2026
- Constituency: Maule Region

Member of the Chamber of Deputies
- In office 11 March 2018 – 11 March 2022
- Constituency: District 18
- In office 11 March 2002 – 11 March 2018
- Preceded by: Osvaldo Vega Vega
- Constituency: 40th District

Personal details
- Born: 16 September 1957 (age 68) Santiago, Chile
- Party: Renovación Nacional (1987−1997); Independent Democratic Union (UDI; 2001−2018); Republican Party (2019–)
- Occupation: Politician

Ignacio Urrutia Bonilla (born 16 September 1957) is a Chilean farmer and politician.

A member of the Republican Party of Chile since 2019, he served as a Deputy for the 18th electoral district of the Maule Region from 2018 to 2022, and previously represented the former 40th electoral district of the same region for four consecutive terms (2002–2018).

A supporter of Augusto Pinochet, he campaigned and voted against the legalization of same-sex marriage in the National Congress of Chile, calling it "a light show or cover to distract from the situations being lived through in Chile today."

== Biography ==
Urrutia was born in Santiago, Chile, on 16 September 1957. He is the son of Ignacio Urrutia del Río and Rebeca Bonilla, the grandson of Ignacio Urrutia de la Sotta, and the great-grandson of Ignacio Urrutia Manzano.

He is married to Carmen Guzmán Hernández, and they have three children: Ignacio, Josefina, and José Tomás. He completed his secondary education at the Sagrados Corazones school (Padres Franceses de Alameda) in Santiago.

Professionally, Urrutia has worked primarily in agriculture and livestock brokerage. He has also served for several terms as president of agricultural associations in his local area.

== Political career ==
Urrutia began his political career in 1987 as a member of National Renewal (RN), motivated by his friendship with former senator Sergio Onofre Jarpa. Between 1993 and 1997, he served as the party’s regional president, resigning from RN in 1997.

In December 2001, he was elected as a Deputy for the 40th electoral district of the Maule Region—covering the communes of Cauquenes, Chanco, Longaví, Parral, Pelluhue, and Retiro—as an independent candidate within the Alliance for Chile coalition.

After taking office in 2002, he formally joined the Independent Democratic Union (UDI). He was subsequently re-elected as Deputy for the same district in the parliamentary elections of 2005, 2009, and 2013.

In the 2017 parliamentary elections, Urrutia won a fifth term in the Chamber of Deputies, this time representing the newly created 18th electoral district of the Maule Region as a member of the UDI within the Chile Vamos coalition.

In December 2018, he resigned from the UDI in order to support the presidential candidacy of José Antonio Kast. Since 2019, he has been a member of the Republican Party (REP), initially serving as vice president of the party.
