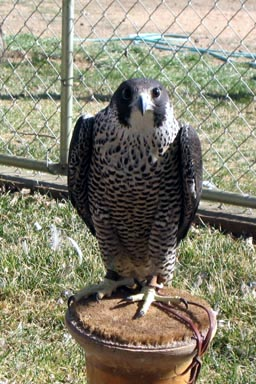
- Female

Scientific classification
- Kingdom: Animalia
- Phylum: Chordata
- Class: Aves
- Order: Falconiformes
- Family: Falconidae
- Genus: Falco
- Species: F. peregrinus
- Subspecies: F. p. pealei

Trinomial name
- Falco peregrinus pealei Ridgway, 1873

= Peale's falcon =

Species of Bird

Peale's falcon (Falco peregrinus pealei) is a subspecies of the peregrine falcon. This subspecies was first identified by the ornithologist Robert Ridgway in 1873, named in honor of Titian Ramsay Peale. These birds are the largest subspecies of peregrines (on average) anywhere in the world.

== Description ==
Measurements for male F. p. pealei are as follows: length 16.3 inches (41 cm), wingspan 36.2 inches (92 cm), wing chord 12.60–13.58 in (320–345 mm). For females: length 18.7 inches (47 cm), wingspan 43.6 inches (111 cm), wing chord 14.29–15.39 in (363–391 mm)

Weight range for male F. p. pealei are 28.57–37.32 oz (810–1,058 g), averaging 33.65 oz (954 g); females range 43.88–56.33 oz (1,244–1,597 g), averaging 49.31 oz (1,398 g).

The adults are generally identified by the presence of heavy horizontal barring across their abdomen, large "tear-drop" shaped markings on their breast (more pronounced in the females) extending up into the auriculars, a white, smokey-white, or grayish background color on the breast (as opposed to the salmon to orangish background color on most other subspecies), very broad malar stripe to a full dark cap, and wider, stronger mandibles than is commonly seen in the species as a whole.

Immature birds are overall very dark, with little to no buff-colored edging to the feathers of the mantle, nearly completely dark heads, and very heavily streaked ventral markings. Rectrices are usually unbarred. Feet and cere color varies from light blue to light yellow.

== Distribution, habitat, and population status ==
The breeding range of F. p. pealei is a rather linear one being entirely coastal in orientation. Starting in the western part of the range, the Commander Islands are generally thought to be the extent to which they exist in Russia. Although they are speculatively referenced as nesting on the Kamchatka Peninsula and possibly the northern Kurile Islands, no evidence has been provided to support these locations. From the Commander Islands eastward they are found throughout the Aleutian Islands to the Sanak Islands, Cherni Island, Deer Island, the Pavlof Islands, and the Shumagin Islands. This area constitutes the western sub-population of F. p. pealei and is an estimated 375–580 breeding pairs strong in Alaskan territory and 20–25 pairs in Russian territory. This group has a very uniformly and densely distributed population, with roughly 5–8 miles (8.0–12.9 km) of coastline between each eyrie on average. This group also has a tendency to be more uniform in morphology.

The Alexander Archipelago, Haida Gwaii, portions of the British Columbia coast, the outer coast of Vancouver Island, and the Olympic Peninsula make up the eastern sub-population of F. p. pealei. The highest density of peregrines anywhere in the world was recorded on Langara Island in the mid 1950s. Ten nests being occupied in a single small bay of only 7.5 mi (12.1 km) of coastline, and a total of 21 nests on the whole island. Unfortunately this astounding concentration of peregrine falcons was intimately linked to the very robust local seabird population that has declined since the 1950s due to unknown factors. Possible culprits for the decline include introduced non-native predators of seabirds such as rats and raccoons, coupled with possible changes brought on by human activities in the oceanic food chain on which the seabird colonies depend. The peregrine population of Langara Island is now believed to be about 25% of what it once was. The current population of the eastern sub-group of F. p. pealei is about 20 breeding pairs in Washington, about 100 pairs in British Columbia, and about another 100 pairs in the Alexander Archipelago.

Along the south side of the Alaska Peninsula, the Kodiak Islands, portions of Cook Inlet, the Kenai Peninsula, Prince William Sound, and eastward to Glacier Bay constitutes the central sub-population of F. p. pealei. This area is marked by a decidedly lower population density than either the eastern or western populations. This fact and the slightly different morphology of this sub-group has caused some confusion amongst researchers as to the validity of F. p. pealei existing within this range.

Within its range, Peale's falcon can be found on rough, rocky seashores, sea cliffs, seastacks, islands, islets, and beaches.

== Hunting and food habits ==
Peale's falcon concentrates on hunting Alcids, often nesting very near seabird colonies for this purpose. However, this is not necessary for a successful eyrie. A study on Amchitka Island from 1968 to 1973 found that an average of 18.6 eyries on the island were in no close proximity to seabird colonies, as no sizeable colonies existed on the island. Instead, these large, robust birds fly out to sea to hunt up to 50 miles from land, rather than inland. This is an impressive physical feat, as peregrines are not able to rest floating on water as seabirds do. They must either eat their prey while flying, or carry it a very long way back to land to consume it. Preferred species on Amchitka consisted of: Crested auklet (Aethia cristatella), 26.48% of the diet's biomass; Ancient murrelet (Synthliboramphus antiquus), 17.18% of the biomass; and alcids as a group provided 65.52% of the biomass.

Other important prey species that this specialized population of peregrines are fond of are fork-tailed storm petrels, Leach's storm petrels, and black-legged kittiwakes.
