= Piedra Negra Airport =

- IATA: none; ICAO: SCKE

Summary
- Airport type: Public
- Serves: Pelluhue, Chile
- Location: Curanipe
- Elevation AMSL: 164 ft / 50 m
- Coordinates: 35°51′15″S 72°38′45″W

Map
- Location of Piedra Negra Airport in Chile

Runways
Direction	Length		Surface
Direction	m	ft	Surface
04/22	635	2,083	Grass
- Source: Landings.com Google Maps GCM

Piedra Negra Airport (Spanish: Aeropuerto Piedra Negra), (ICAO: SCKE) is an airstrip just southwest of Curanipe, a Pacific coastal town 6 kilometres (4 mi) southwest of Pelluhue, in the Maule Region of Chile.

The airstrip is in a wooded section less than 1 kilometre (0.6 mi) inland from the shore. The runway has a rising slope to the northeast.

== See also ==
- Transport in Chile
- List of airports in Chile
