= List of shipwrecks in March 1885 =

The list of shipwrecks in March 1885 includes ships sunk, foundered, grounded, or otherwise lost during March 1885.

== 1 March ==
List of shipwrecks: 1 March 1885
Ship	State	Description
Little Beauty	United Kingdom	The ship was driven ashore at North Saltfleet Haven, Lincolnshire.

== 2 March ==
List of shipwrecks: 2 March 1885
Ship	State	Description
Lykus	United Kingdom	The ship ran aground in the River Tweed.

== 4 March ==
List of shipwrecks: 4 March 1885
Ship	State	Description
John Henry	United Kingdom	The lighter sank after striking the Rae, a sunken rock off the Lowlands, St Keverne, Cornwall. Her crew survived.
River Lagan	United Kingdom	The barque was wrecked on the Islas Año Nuevo, Argentina. Her eighteen crew survived.

== 5 March ==
List of shipwrecks: 5 March 1885
Ship	State	Description
Carlos	Germany	The steamship ran aground in the River Blyth.
Tonquin	France	The ocean liner, chartered to the French Government as a troop transport, collided with the steamship Maurice et Réunion (France) and sank off Málaga, Spain with the loss of 24 of her 62 crew.

== 7 March ==
List of shipwrecks: 7 March 1885
Ship	State	Description
Blanche Maud	United Kingdom	The ship was sighted off Prawle Point, Devon whilst on a voyage from Leith, Lothian to Valparaíso, Chile. No further trace, reported missing.

== 8 March ==
List of shipwrecks: 8 March 1885
Ship	State	Description
Akyab	Italy	The schooner ran aground on the Cross Sand, in the North Sea off the coast of Suffolk, United Kingdom. She was on a voyage from Cyprus to Hull, Yorkshire, United Kingdom. She was refloated and taken in to Harwich, Essex, United Kingdom in a leaky condition.
Lizzie Bovell	Netherlands	The barque foundered in the North Sea 40 nautical miles (74 km) off Lowestoft. Her crew were rescued, some of them by the lugger Little Pet (United Kingdom). Lizzie Bovell was on a voyage from Amsterdam, North Holland to Lowestoft.
Vixen	United Kingdom	The smack was run into by Monarch (United Kingdom) and sank in the River Laggan. Her crew were rescued.

== 9 March ==
List of shipwrecks: 9 March 1885
Ship	State	Description
Blonde	United Kingdom	The schooner ran aground on the Maplin Sand, in the North Sea off the coast of Essex.
Cheviot	United Kingdom	The ship departed from Port Augusta, South Australia for Cape Town, Cape Colony. No further trace, reported missing.
Water Lily	United Kingdom	The steam trawler foundered off Moss Head. Her crew were rescued by a steamship.

== 10 March ==
List of shipwrecks: 10 March 1885
Ship	State	Description
Hispania, and Vane Tempest	United Kingdom	The steamships collided in the River Thames at Barking, Essex. Hispania was severely damaged. Vane Tempest sank. She was later refloated and towed in to Limehouse, Middlesex.
Magneta	United Kingdom	The steamship was sighted off Portland, Dorset whilst on a voyage from London to Singapore, Straits Settlements. Presumed subsequently foundered in the Bay of Biscay with the loss of all 51 people on board. A lifeboat was discovered on 24 March by the steamship Palmyra (United Kingdom) 200 nautical miles (370 km) north of Cape Finisterre, Spain. Two bodies thought to have been crew members of Magneta washed ashore at "Cobas".
Queen of Devon	United Kingdom	The brig collided with the steamship Prudhoe Castle (United Kingdom) and foundered in the Bristol Channel off the coast of Glamorgan. Her crew were rescued byPrudhoe Castle.
Shannon	United Kingdom	The steamship was sighted in the Atlantic Ocean whilst on a voyage from London to Calcutta, India. No further trace, reported missing.

== 11 March ==
List of shipwrecks: 11 March 1885
Ship	State	Description
Unnamed	Flag unknown	The steamship sank off The Cumbraes, Buteshire.

== 12 March ==
List of shipwrecks: 12 March 1885
Ship	State	Description
Williams	United Kingdom	The schooner ran aground on the Holme Sand, in the Humber. She was on a voyage from Hull, Yorkshire to Southampton, Hampshire. She was refloated and towed in to Hull in a leaky condition.

== 13 March ==
List of shipwrecks: 13 March 1885
Ship	State	Description
Andalusian	United Kingdom	The steamship ran aground in the River Ouse. She was on a voyage from Goole, Yorkshire to London.
Kate	(United Kingdom of Great Britain and Ireland) Isle of Man	The fishing lugger collided with the steamship Caledonian (United Kingdom) west of the Calf of Man and sank with the loss of four of her crew. Survivors were rescued by Caledonian. Kate was on a voyage from Peel to Silloth, Cumberland.

== 14 March ==
List of shipwrecks: 14 March 1885
Ship	State	Description
Cort Adler	Norway	The barque ran aground at Port Talbot, Glamorgan, United Kingdom and was severely damaged. She was on a voyage from Norway to Port Talbot. She was refloated on 17 March.
Klistine	Flag unknown	The barque was destroyed by fire in the Atlantic Ocean (30°30′N 77°34′W).
Vennerne	Denmark	The ship was driven ashore and severely damaged at Montevideo, Uruguay. She was refloated was assistance from a tug.

== 15 March ==
List of shipwrecks: 15 March 1885
Ship	State	Description
Corean	United Kingdom	The steamship was damaged by fire in the Royal Victoria Dock, London.

== 16 March ==
List of shipwrecks: 16 March 1885
Ship	State	Description
Bessie M. Wells	United States	The fishing schooner was lost on Seal Island, Nova Scotia, Canada. Her crew were on the island for eight days before being able to return to the mainland.
Champion	United States	The fishing schooner was wrecked at White Head, near Rockland, Maine. Her crew got off in her dories.

== 17 March ==
List of shipwrecks: 17 March 1885
Ship	State	Description
Eddie Pierce	United States	The fishing schooner was wrecked on Peaked Hill Bars, Massachusetts. Her seventeen crew were rescued by the United States Life Saving Service.
Hannah	United Kingdom	The schooner ran aground on Taylor's Bank, in Liverpool Bay. Her crew were rescued by the tug City of London (United Kingdom). Hannah was on a voyage from Belfast, County Antrim to Widnes, Cheshire. She was refloated and taken in tow by the tug Lord Stanley, which put two of her crew aboard, but sank 1 nautical mile (1.9 km) north north east of the Formby Lightship ( Trinity House) with the loss of a life.
La Clochetterie	French Navy	The cruiser sank at Cherbourg, Manche.

== 18 March ==
List of shipwrecks: 18 March 1885
Ship	State	Description
J. P. Frecker	United Kingdom	The ship was run down and sunk off the Isle of May, Fife by the steamship Nina. Her crew were rescued. She was on a voyage from Sunderland, County Durham to Port Gordon, Inverness-shire.

== 19 March ==
List of shipwrecks: 19 March 1885
Ship	State	Description
Gloria del Mare	United Kingdom	The barque was run ashore at Faro, Portugal with some loss of life. She was on a voyage from Plymouth, Devon, United Kingdom to Savona.
Marys	United Kingdom	The sloop ran aground on Taylor's Bank, in Liverpool Bay. Her three crew were rescued by a lifeboat. She was on a voyage from Douglas, Isle of Man to Liverpool, Lancashire.
Michigan	United States	The passenger ship was sunk by ice in Lake Michigan with the loss of one of her 29 crew. Survivors were rescued by the tug Arctic (United States).
Pinnas	United Kingdom	The steamship struck the breakwater at Sunderland, County Durham and was severely damaged. She was on a voyage from Hamburg, Germany to Sunderland.

== 20 March ==
List of shipwrecks: 20 March 1885
Ship	State	Description
Ellora	United Kingdom	The ship departed from Calcutta, India for London. No further trace, reported overdue.
Hirondelle	United Kingdom	The brigantine collided with the barquentine Mary Ann (United Kingdom) and sank north east of Lundy Island, Devon. Her seven crew were rescued by Mary Ann. Hirondelle was on a voyage from Cardiff, Glamorgan to Dakar, Senegal.
Rhondda	United Kingdom	The ship collided with Brooklyn City (Flag unknown) and sank between Holmes and the lightship. Her crew were rescued.
Saga	United Kingdom	The ship collided with the tug Ranger (United Kingdom) and was severely damaged at Liverpool, Lancashire. She was on a voyage from Charleston, South Carolina, United States to Liverpool.
Staghound	United Kingdom	The ship departed from Astoria, Oregon, United States for a British port. No further trace, reported missing.
William	United Kingdom	The schooner was run into by the steamship Owen Tudor (United Kingdom) and sank in the River Mersey. Her crew were rescued.

== 21 March ==
List of shipwrecks: 21 March 1885
Ship	State	Description
Nares	United Kingdom	The barge caught fire at London Bridge, London. The fire was extinguished with assistance from the fire float Buffalo (United Kingdom).

== 22 March ==
List of shipwrecks: 22 March 1885
Ship	State	Description
Charlotte	Germany	The barque collided with the barque Erato (United Kingdom) and sank in the English Channel 4 nautical miles (7.4 km) off Dungeness, Kent, United Kingdom. Her crew were rescued by Erato.
Tregenna	United Kingdom	The steamship ran aground in the Dardanelles. She was on a voyage from Nicholaieff, Russia to Bristol, Gloucestershire. She was refloated and resumed her voyage.

== 23 March ==
List of shipwrecks: 23 March 1885
Ship	State	Description
Cornwallis	Canada	The ship was abandoned in the Atlantic Ocean. Her crew were rescued by the steamship Rhynland (Belgium). Cornwallis was on a voyage from Antwerp, Belgium to New York, United States.

== 25 March ==
List of shipwrecks: 25 March 1885
Ship	State	Description
Hunter	United States	The steamship foundered 60 nautical miles (110 km) north of the Turks Islands. Her crew were rescued. She was on a voyage from Boston, Massachusetts to Baracoa, Cuba.
Twenty-one Friends	United States	The schooner was abandoned in the Atlantic Ocean off Cape Hatteras, Virginia. She was discovered off the Irish coast in October. The Royal Navy were ordered to destroy the wreck.

== 27 March ==
List of shipwrecks: 27 March 1885
Ship	State	Description
Eliza	United Kingdom	The schooner was wrecked on Taylor's Bank, in Liverpool Bay. Her crew were rescued by the Liverpool Lifeboat.
Loyalty	United Kingdom	The schooner was driven ashore at Milford Haven, Pembrokeshire. She was on a voyage from Cardiff, Glamorgan to Holyhead, Anglesey.

== 28 March ==
List of shipwrecks: 28 March 1885
Ship	State	Description
Inver Leith	United Kingdom	The steamship ran aground in the Clyde near Port Glasgow, Renfrewshire. She was refloated.
Lin Yun	China	The ferry was run into by the steamship Oroates (flag unknown) and sank in the Huantupa River with the loss of 75 of the 112 people on board.
Marys	United Kingdom	The 52-foot (16 m) trawling smack stranded on Jordan Bank in the River Mersey and was abandoned, a Total Loss.
Nan B	United States	The schooner sprang a leak and sank on the southeast point of Chernaburna Island, District of Alaska. Her crew of three survived.
St. Bernard	United Kingdom	The steamship was run into by the steamship Trio (United Kingdom) and sank in the River Tyne. She was on a voyage from the River Tyne to Bombay, India. She was refloated the next day and taken in to drydock for repairs.

== 29 March ==
List of shipwrecks: 29 March 1885
Ship	State	Description
French Van Gilder	United States	The schooner was wrecked on the Tuckernuck Shoal in Nantucket Sound (41°24.1′N 070°13′W). Her crew survived.
Grace	United Kingdom	The brig was driven ashore and severely damaged at Drummore, Wigtownshire. She was on a voyage from Maryport, Cumberland to Drummore.
Hestia	United Kingdom	The steamship departed from Newport, Monmouthshire for Saint-Malo, Ille-et-Vilaine, France. No further trace, reported missing.
Willie	United Kingdom	The Mersey Flat collided with Sappho (United Kingdom) in the River Mersey. She was beached at Tranmere, Cheshire.

== 30 March ==
List of shipwrecks: 30 March 1885
Ship	State	Description
Gnat	United Kingdom	The Mersey Flat was holed by her anchor and sank at Egremont, Lancashire. She was on a voyage from Rhyl, Denbighshire to Liverpool, Lancashire. She subsequently became a wreck.
Rhuddland Castle	United Kingdom	The barque ran aground on the Goodwin Sands, Kent. She was on a voyage from South Shields, County Durham to Valparaíso, Chile. She was refloated with assistance from the tug Victor (United Kingdom) and anchored in The Downs. Subsequently repaired at Birkenhead, Cheshire.

== 31 March ==
List of shipwrecks: 31 March 1885
Ship	State	Description
Princess Beatrice	United Kingdom	The steamship collided with the quayside at Larne, County Antrim and became embedded. She was on a voyage from Stranraer, Wigtownshire to Larne.

== Unknown date ==
List of shipwrecks: Unknown date in March 1885
Ship	State	Description
Alamo	United States	The steamship was driven ashore in the Dry Tortugas.
Albert	Sweden	The barque was abandoned in the North Sea. She was on a voyage from Kragerø, Norway to London, United Kingdom. She was discovered on the Dogger Bank by a fishing smack and was subsequently towed in to the River Tyne in a waterlogged condition by the tug America (United Kingdom).
Alderman Ridley	United Kingdom	The tugboat collided with Captain Parry (United Kingdom) and sank in the River Liffey.
Alexandria	United Kingdom	The barque was driven ashore at Benghazi, Ottoman Tripolitania. She was later refloated and taken in to Malta for repairs.
Amulet	Netherlands	The steamship was driven ashore at Monster, South Holland. She was on a voyage from Leith, Lothian, United Kingdom to Rotterdam, South Holland.
Anna	Italy	The barque was wrecked on the Isla de los Estados, Argentina. Her crew were rescued. She was on a voyage from Genoa to Valparaíso, Chile.
Annettin	Italy	The barque was driven ashore at Selsey, Sussex, United Kingdom. She was refloated with assistance from the tug Malta (United Kingdom) and taken in to Portsmouth, Hampshire, United Kingdom.
Asia	United Kingdom	The steamship ran aground in the Hooghly River. She was refloated and put back to Calcutta, India for repairs.
Bedale	United Kingdom	The steamship ran aground on the Shipwash Sand, in the North Sea off the coast of Suffolk. Her crew were rescued by the Caister Lifeboat Covent Garden ( Royal National Lifeboat Institution). Bedale was refloated with assistance from Covent Garden, the yawls Deben and Jane, and the tugs Harwich and Robert Owen (all United Kingdom).
Bothwell Castle	New South Wales	The barque was wrecked in the "Ngarik Islands". Her crew were rescued.
Catherine	United Kingdom	The ship struck rocks off Ballywalter, County Antrim. She was on a voyage from Dublin to Larne, County Antrim. She put in to Donaghadee, County Down in a leaky condition.
City of Atlanta, and D. J. Foley	United States	The steamship City of Atlanta collided with D. J. Foley. Both vessels were severely damaged. City of Atlanta was on a voyage from Charleston, South Carolina to New York. D. J. Foley was on a voyage from Philadelphia, Pennsylvania to Port Antonio, Jamaica.
City of Chelsea	United Kingdom	The schooner was wrecked in the Cayman Islands. She was on a voyage from Lucca, Italy to Mobile, Alabama, United States.
Concettina	Italy	The barque was wrecked at the Point de Coubre, Gironde, France with loss of life. She was on a voyage from Pensacola, Florida, United States to Bordeaux, Gironde.
Corrientes	United Kingdom	The barque foundered off Curanipe, Chile. Her crew were rescued.
Cupido	Norway	The barque was abandoned at sea. Her crew were rescued. She was on a voyage from Drammen to Glasgow, Renfrewshire, United Kingdom. She was substequently towed in to Stavanger by a steamship.
Deerhound	United Kingdom	The steam trawler was driven ashore on Inchkeith, Fife. She was refloated on 31 March but consequently foundered.
Easdale	United Kingdom	The steam lighter was driven ashore on Great Cumbrae, Bute.
Elizabeth	United Kingdom	The steamship ran aground at the Trekroner Fort, Denmark. She was on a voyage from Oxelösund, Sweden to Gloucester. She was later refloated and resumed her voyage.
Elizabeth Ann	United Kingdom	The ship ran aground on the Middle Spit Bank, in the Bristol Channel. She floated off and sank off the Whiteford Lighthouse, Glamorgan. Her crew were rescued by the tug Ranger (United Kingdom).
Esther	Austria-Hungary	The brig was driven ashore on the Talland Sand, on the coast of Cornwall, United Kingdom. She was on a voyage from Falmouth, Cornwall to London. She was refloated on 15 March with the assistance of a tug and taken in to Fowey, Cornwall.
Fawn	United Kingdom	The steamship was driven ashore at Ballantrae, Ayrshire.
Gallant	United Kingdom	The ship was wrecked at Torrevieja, Spain. She was on a voyage from Dublin to Santander, Spain.
Harald Haarfager	Flag unknown	The ship was driven ashore on Liat Island, Netherlands East Indies. She was later refloated and towed in to Batavia, Netherlands East Indies.
Ironopolis	United Kingdom	The steamship sank at Brest, Finistère, France. She was a total loss.
Itaska	Flag unknown	The ship was abandoned at sea. Her crew were rescued. She was on a voyage from Penedo, Brazil to New York.
Jeune Amiral	Brazil	The steamship foundered at sea. All on board were rescued. She was on a voyage from Amarração to Cayenne, French Guiana.
John James	United Kingdom	The schooner was driven ashore in Duart Bay. She was refloated on 30 March and taken in to Craignure, Isle of Mull.
John Morrison	United Kingdom	The ship ran aground on the Black Rock, in Newry Lough.
Kenilworth	United Kingdom	The ship foundered off the Isla de la Juventud, Cuba. Her crew were rescued. She was on a voyage from Buenos Aires, Argentina to New York.
Lady Frances	United Kingdom	The steamship was driven ashore at Scardovari, Italy. She was later refloated and taken in to Venice.
Leader	United Kingdom	The steamship ran aground on the Ketelplaat. She was on a voyage from Odesa, Russia to Antwerp, Belgium. She broke in two and was a total loss.
Leonard Hollis	United Kingdom	The schooner was wrecked on the North Rock, off the coast of County Down. Her crew were rescued.
Livlig	Norway	The barque was driven ashore at Blokhus, Denmark. Her crew were rescued.
Ludwig	Flag unknown	The ship was abandoned in the Atlantic Ocean. Her crew were rescued. She was on a voyage from Galveston, Texas, United States to Falmouth
Maria	Netherlands	The brig was abandoned in the Atlantic Ocean before 30 March. She was discovered on 1 April by Beatrice ()United Kingdom and set afire.
Meta	Germany	The schooner was driven ashore and wrecked at Thisted, Denmark. She was on a voyage from London to Malmö, Sweden.
Morocco	United Kingdom	The steamship was driven ashore at "Erekleya", Ottoman Empire.
Nedjed	United Kingdom	The steamship was severely damaged by fire at Marseille, Bouches-du-Rhône, France. She was on a voyage from Bombay, India to Marseille.
Olivia	United Kingdom	The steamship was driven ashore at "Berberin", Manche, France. Her crew were rescued.
Orion	Germany	The schooner was driven ashore 6 nautical miles (11 km) south of Memel.
Penang	United Kingdom	The ship caught fire at Singapore, Straits Settlements and was scuttled.
Prince	United Kingdom	The pilot boat collided with the pilot boat Alfred William (United Kingdom) and sank at Cardiff, Glamorgan.
Princeport	United Kingdom	The ship was wrecked on Dyer's Island, Cape Colony. Her crew were rescued. She was on a voyage from Calcutta to New York.
Prinz Heinrich	Germany	The steamship was driven ashore at "Barra Falsa", Brazil.
Queen of Devon	United Kingdom	The brig collided with a steamship and sank off Swansea, Glamorgan. Her crew survived.
Queen of the Fleet	United Kingdom	The barque was driven ashore at Holyhead, Anglesey. She was refloated on 31 March.
Reaper	United Kingdom	The schooner was driven ashore on "Island Lewes", County Londonderry.
Severn	United Kingdom	The steamship collided with the steamship Indus (France) and sank off Havre de Grâce, Seine-Inférieure, France. Her crew were rescued. Severn was on a voyage from Sicily, Italy to Rouen, Seine-Inférieure.
Solway Queen	United Kingdom	The steamship ran aground at Port Talbot, Glamorgan. She was on a voyage from Port Talbot to Taibach.
Thomas Russell	New Zealand	The steamship was driven ashore and wrecked in Poverty Bay. All on board were rescued.
Tregenna	United Kingdom	The steamship ran aground off the coast of the Ottoman Empire. She was on a voyage from Nicholaieff, Russia to Malta.
Tripudio	Italy	The barque was wrecked on the Oyster Reef, off the coast of Burma. She was on a voyage from South Shields, County Durham, United Kingdom to Rangoon, Burma.
Ulleswater	United Kingdom	The steamship ran aground at Gibraltar.
Vivid	United Kingdom	The brig ran aground on the Haisborough Sands, in the North Sea off the coast of Norfolk. She was on a voyage from Southampton, Hampshire to Sunderland, County Durham. She was refloated and towed in to Lowestoft, Suffolk in a leaky condition.
No. 45	French Navy	The No. 24-class torpedo boat sank in a storm.
Unnamed	United States	The barque sank during a severe gale at Tamatave, Madagascar.
Three unnamed vessels	France	Three transport ships sank during a severe gale at Tamatave with the loss of seventeen lives.
Unnamed	Flag unknown	The steamship sank in the Bristol Channel off Weston-super-Mare, Somerset.
