= Midun Island =

Island in Alaska

- Coordinates: 54°50′24″N 162°10′30″W
- Elevation: 46 m (150 ft)

Midun Island or Miduun Island is an uninhabited island in Aleutians East Borough, Alaska, United States. It is at the southwestern end of the Aleutian Range, about 4 mi (6.4 km) southeast of Deer Island and northeast of the Sanak Islands.

Midun Island was named by W. H. Dall of the United States Coast and Geodetic Survey in 1882.
