= Mario Papi =

Chilean politician

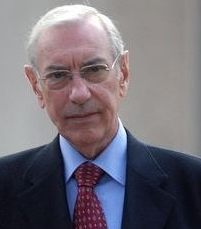

Head of Televisión Nacional de Chile
- In office 2008–2010
- President: Michelle Bachelet

Member of the Senate
- In office 11 March 1990 – 11 March 1994
- Preceded by: District created
- Succeeded by: Manuel Matta Aragay
- Constituency: 11th Circunscription

Personal details
- Born: 10 November 1946 Puerto Montt, Chile
- Died: 13 May 2012 (aged 65) Santiago, Chile
- Party: Social Democracy Party; Radical Left Party; Radical Social Democratic Party
- Spouse: Claudia Musatadi
- Children: Two
- Parent(s): Mario Papi Botti; Nely Beyer Bórquez
- Education: Pontifical Catholic University of Valparaíso (LL.B)
- Occupation: Politician
- Profession: Lawyer

Mario Egidio Papi Beyer (born 6 November 1946−13 May 2012) was a Chilean lawyer, politician and former head of Televisión Nacional de Chile.

== Biography ==
Born in 1948, he is the son of Mario Papi Botti and Nely Beyer Bórquez. Also, Mario Papi was the uncle of the disappeared boy Rodrigo Anfruns. He was first married to Claudia Musatadi Sibisa, with whom he had two children. In his second marriage, he met Marta Parodi.

His studies were carried out at the Instituto Nacional Barros Arana (IBAN). Then, Papi joined the Pontificia Universidad Católica de Valparaíso Law School obtaining his BA on 9 June 1980. His undergraduate thesis was titled «The Municipal Concession».

He has been a professor at his alma mater since 1972. At the PUCV, Papi taught the chairs of Public International Law and Introduction to Law. He also worked at the DUOC Valparaíso from 1978 to 1979 in the Chair of Introduction to Law. On the other hand, he also taught at the Universidad La República (1989) and at the Miguel de Cervantes University, where he was dean of the Faculty of Law.

In his professional activity, he was the Attorney General of the BancoEstado in Valparaíso (1971−1980). After receiving his law degree, he dedicated himself to the free exercise of his profession, so he founded his legal firm Papi & Kegevic.

Mario Papi also collaborated in the journalistic field (1981−1982) where he was a columnist for Las Últimas Noticias and Qué Pasa. He also wrote in El Mercurio de Valparaíso, La Segunda, Hoy Magazine and Ercilla Magazine. Papi was also a regular panellist for Radio Agricultura and Radio Portales.

== Political career ==
He began his activities in politics at the INBA, being a leader of the Federation of Secondary Students of Chile: "Fesech". In 1972, Mario Papi joined the Radical Left Party, where he became president of the youth branch and served as undersecretary, general secretary and vice president.

In 1989, Papi was elected senator in the 1989 parliamentary election as an independent candidate close to the Concertación. He served for the period 1990-1994 representing the provinces of Linares and Cauquenes (Maule Sur Region). In the Congress, Papi was a member of the Permanent Commission of National Defense and Transport and Telecommunications. He was a replacement senator on the Permanent Commission on Mining and on the Fisheries and Aquaculture Commission. He didn't run for reelection in the 1993 elections. Nevertheless, Papi tried to return to Congress as a deputy in 2001, without success.

On 18 October 1990, he joined the Chilean Social Democracy Party, which dissolved in 1994. That year he automatically became a member of the Social Democratic Radical Party (PRSD).

Papi was president of Televisión Nacional de Chile from 2008 to 2010. Similarly, he was director of the National Television Council from 2004 to 2012. On the other hand, he was part of the editorial committee of Cambio21. In 2011, he was also appointed member of the Media Ethics Council of Communication of Chile.

He died on 13 May 2012 at the age of 63, product of advanced cancer. A week before his death, he presented his book «Politics of State and Human Rights».
