= Naranjazo (speech) =

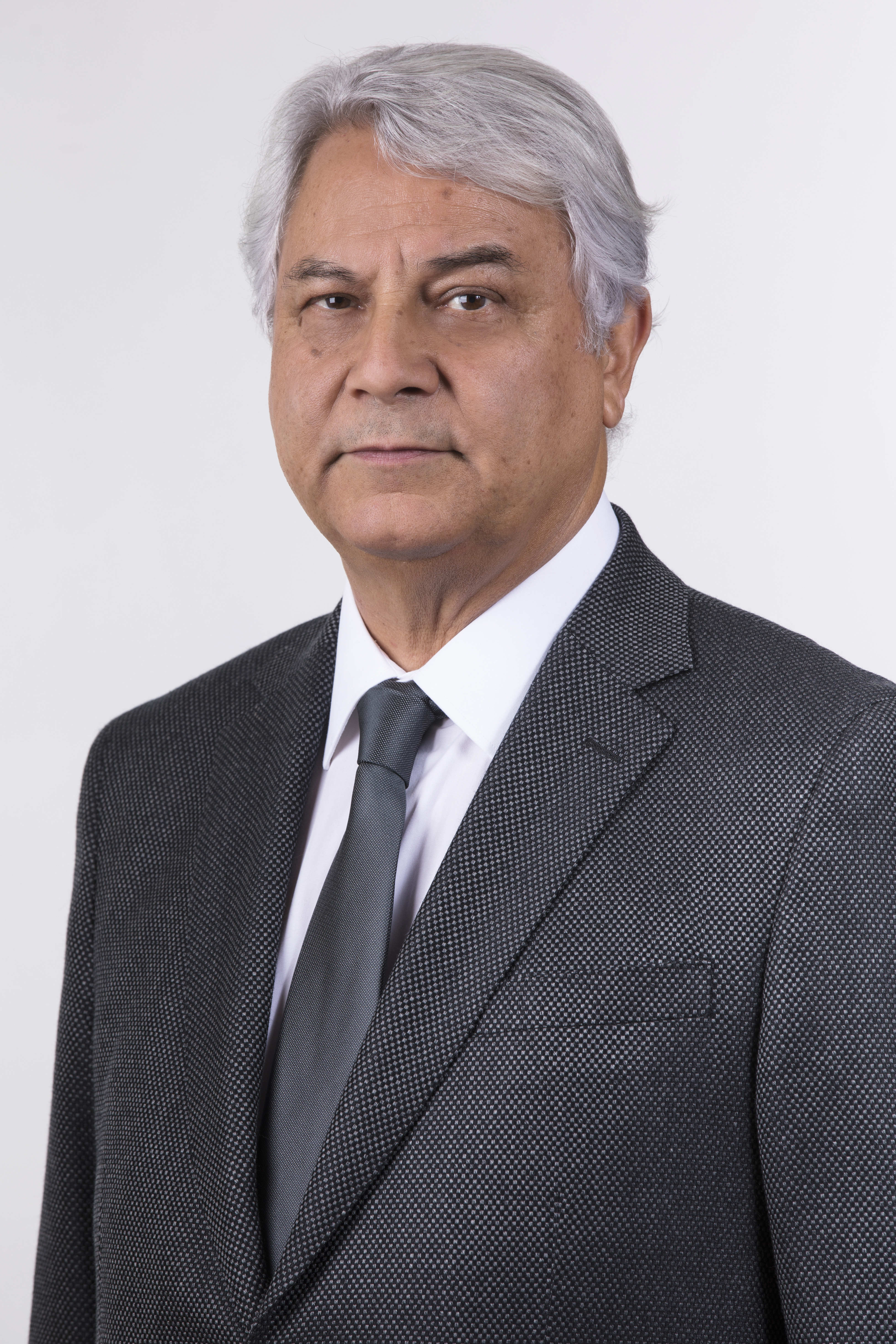
Jaime Naranjo, deputy for district n°18

Naranjazo is the fifteen hours and three minutes speech made on 8 and 9 November 2021 by the Chilean socialist deputy Jaime Naranjo during the debate of a second constitutional accusation against the president of Chile Sebastián Piñera, due to his implication in the Pandora Papers . Due to the fact that the opposition would not have the necessary votes for its approval until the expiration of the preventive quarantines of deputies Giorgio Jackson and Jorge Sabag, Naranjo decided to use filibustering techniques until the arrival of both legislators. This was due to a legal loophole in the rules of procedure of the lower chamber that allowed the presenter of the constitutional accusation to speak in the hemicycle with no time limit.

According to Naranjo himself, his intervention was based on the reading of more than 1300 pages with the data of the accusation, extending from 10:24 a.m. on Monday, 8 November until the early morning of Tuesday, 9 November 2021, when the two missing deputies had already arrived. This event takes its name from the "naranjazo" of 1964, which resulted in the unexpected election of Congressman Óscar Naranjo Arias and had repercussions in the presidential election of that year.

== See also ==
- Filibuster
