= Retiro, Chile =

Retiro
- Town and Commune
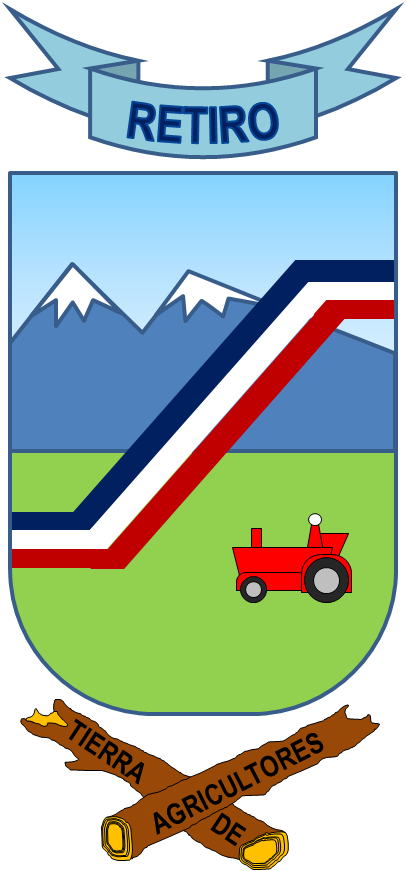
- Coat of arms Location of the Retiro commune in the Maule Region Location in Chile
- Coordinates (city): 36°02′S 71°46′W
- Country: Chile
- Region: Maule
- Province: Linares
- Founded: 1937

Government
  - Type: Municipality
  - Alcalde: Patricio Contreras Contreras (PDC)

Area
  - Total: 827.1 km^{2} (319.3 sq mi)
- Elevation: 143 m (469 ft)

Population (2012 Census)
  - Total: 18,754
  - Density: 22.67/km^{2} (58.73/sq mi)
  - Urban: 4,708
  - Rural: 13,779

Sex
  - Men: 9,451
  - Women: 9,036
- Time zone: UTC-4 (CLT)
  - Summer (DST): UTC-3 (CLST)
- Postal code: 3640000
- Area code: 56 + 73
- Website: www.retiro.cl

Retiro is a town and commune in Chile, located in Linares Province, in the seventh region of Maule.

== Geography ==
Retiro is located 335 km (208 mi) to the south of Santiago, 27 km (17 mi) to the south of the city of Linares (the provincial capital), and 15 km to the north of the city of Parral. The municipality has a surface of 827.1 km^{2} (319 sq mi) and is bordered by San Javier and Longaví on the north, by Parral on the south, by Cauquenes (Province of Cauquenes), on the west and by Longaví on the east.

== History ==
The commune was founded officially on December 22, 1891. President Ramón Barros Luco owned a manor house in this area. Retiro was, therefore, visited frequently by well-known politicians and statesmen of the time, and in general by those that contributed to the decision-making process in the country affairs. The name of "Retiro" (Retirement) was given to the commune on account of being the place of retirement - leisure - of President Barros Luco.

== Demography ==
According to data from the 2002 Census of Population and Housing, the population of the commune of Retiro was 18,487; of these, 4,708 (25.4%) lived in urban areas and 13,779 (74.5%) in rural areas. At that time, there were 9,036 women and 9,451, men. The town of Retiro, has 3,300 inhabitants, whereas Copihue, the second most populated locality in the commune has 1,300 and the village of Villaseca, slightly more than 300. Between 1992 and 2002, the communal population dropped by 6.2% from its 1992 population of 19,703 (a drop of 1,216 persons). During the same period of time, the population of the town of Retiro grew only marginally (70 people).

== Economy ==
Agriculture, in particular wine producing and cereals cultivation constitutes the main economic activity of Retiro. The commune lies within the Maule Valley subregion of the Viticultural Region of the Central Valley of Chile.

== Environs ==
In the area of Copihue (in the southern border of the commune, next to the Pan-American Highway or Ruta 5 Sur), lies the larger poplar wood of the country. It is owned by the "Compañía Chilena de Fósforos".

== Administration ==
As a commune, Retiro is a third-level administrative division of Chile administered by a municipal council, headed by an alcalde who is directly elected every four years. The 2008-2012 alcalde is Patricio Contreras Contreras (PDC).

Within the electoral divisions of Chile, Retiro is represented in the Chamber of Deputies by Guillermo Ceroni (PPD) and Ignacio Urrutia (UDI) as part of the 40th electoral district, together with Longaví, Parral, Cauquenes, Pelluhue and Chanco. The commune is represented in the Senate by Hernán Larraín (UDI) and Ximena Rincón González (PDC) as part of the 11th senatorial constituency (Maule-South).
