= Longaví =

- City and Commune
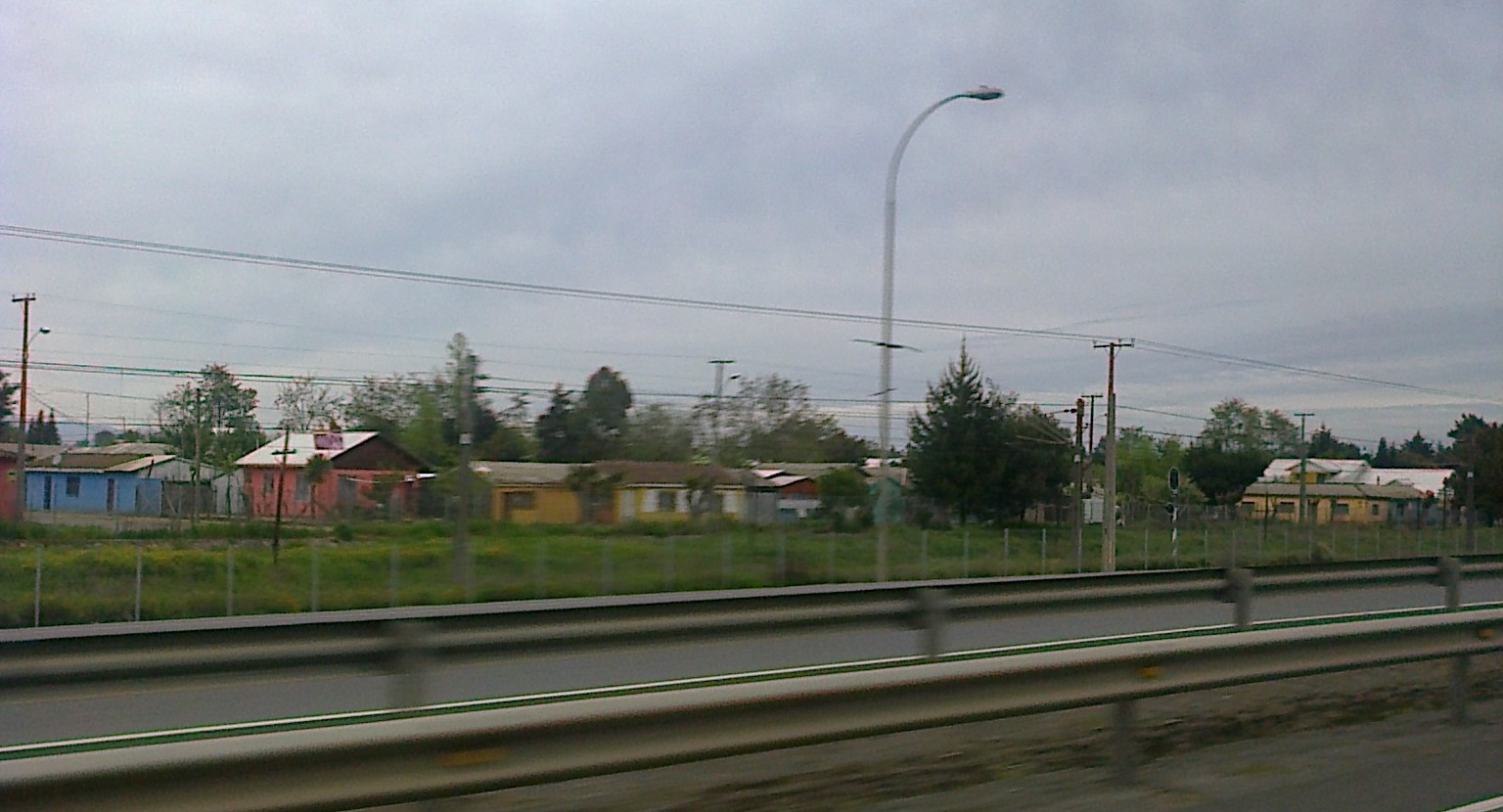
- A view of Longaví City

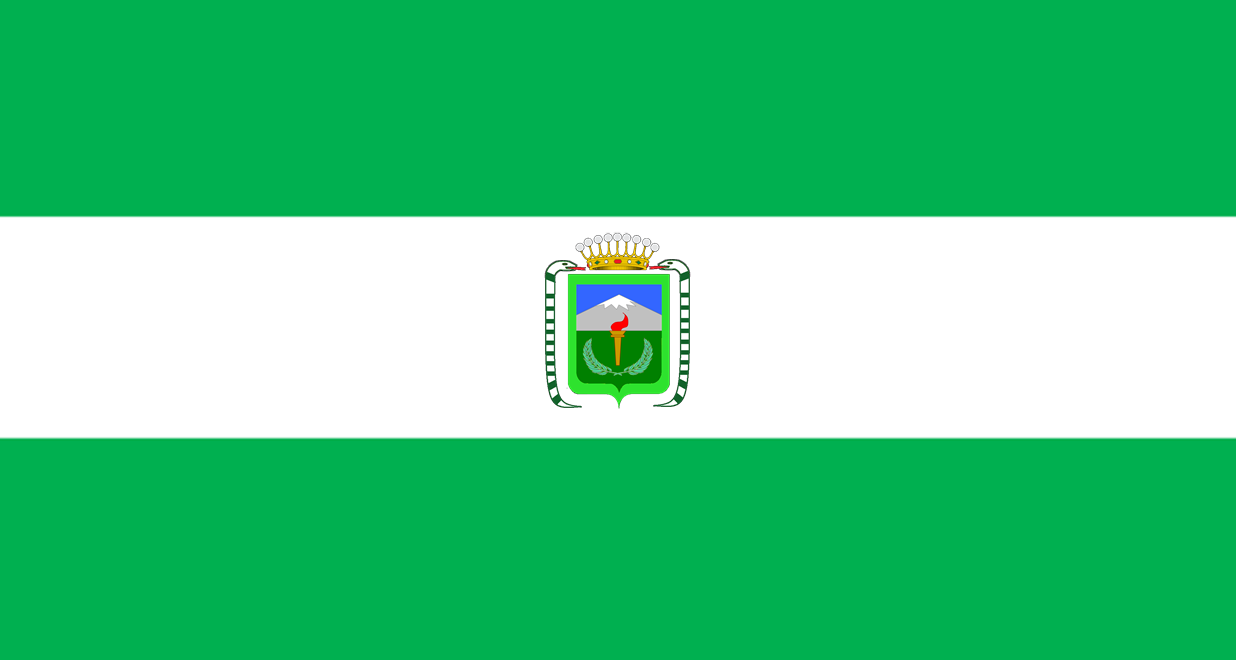
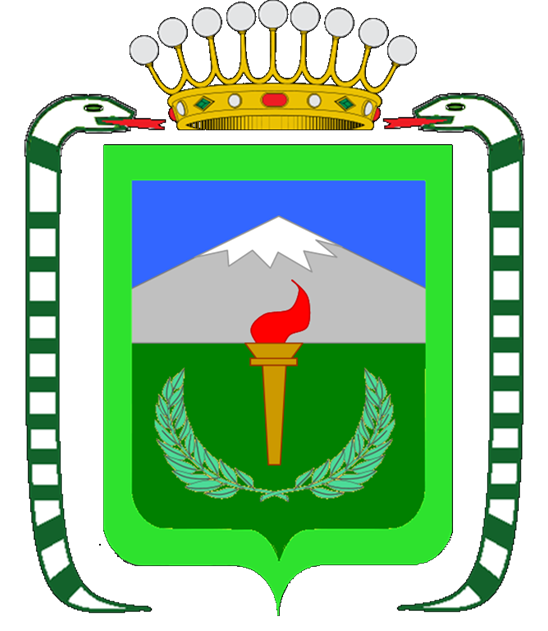
- Flag Coat of arms Location in the Maule Region Location in Chile
- Coordinates: 35°58′S 71°41′W
- Country: Chile
- Region: Maule
- Province: Linares
- Founded: 1937

Government
  - Type: Municipality
  - Alcalde: Mario Briones Araice (PPD)

Area
  - Total: 1,453.8 km^{2} (561.3 sq mi)
  - Rank: 1
- Elevation: 133 m (436 ft)

Population (2012 Census)
  - Total: 28,499
  - Density: 19.603/km^{2} (50.772/sq mi)
  - Urban: 6,206
  - Rural: 21,955

Sex
  - Men: 14649
  - Women: 13512
- Time zone: UTC-4 (CLT)
  - Summer (DST): UTC-3 (CLST)
- Postal code: 3620000
- Area code: 56 + 732
- Website: www.municipalidadlongavi.cl

Longaví (in Mapudungun: snake's head) is a Chilean city and commune located in Linares Province, one of the four provinces that make up the Maule Region, in the geographical center of Chile.

== Geography ==
The commune has a surface of 1,453.8 km^{2} (561 sq mi) and is bordered by Linares in the north, Retiro and Parral in the south, San Javier in the west and Colbún in the east. The Achibueno River separates Longaví from Linares while the Longaví River separates it from Retiro. The city of Longaví lies on the left margin of the Liguay River, in the fertile central plain, and is located 316 km (196 mi) to the south of Santiago, the nation's capital, and 18 km (11 mi) to the south of Linares, the provincial capital. Longaví is linked with the rest of the country by the Pan-American Highway (Ruta 5 Sur).

The foothills of the Andes occupy the eastern part of the commune. The terrain there is mountainous and hilly, with beautiful landscapes, a well-developed hydrographic network and dense woods on the hills. Among the snow-covered mountains, the mountain Longaví (Nevado de Longaví), a stratovolcano, stands for its beauty and characteristic conical shape. It is a scenic spot seen from virtually every point of the central plain nof the province and its neighboring ones.

== Demography ==
According to the 2002 census of the National Statistics Institute, the Longaví commune has 28,161 inhabitants (14,649 men and 13,512 women). Of these, 21,955 (78.0%) lived in rural areas, while the city of Longaví had a population of 6,206 (22.0%). Between the 1992 and 2002 censuses, the population grew by 0.5% (143 persons).

=== Notable people born in Longaví ===
- Arturo Alessandri Palma: politician, statesman and twice the President of Chile

== History ==
Most of what is today the commune of Longaví occupies what was formerly a vast Jesuit estate, The land had been granted to the Society of Jesus in 1639. After the Jesuits' expulsion from South America in 1767, the estate passed to the hands of Mateo Sotomayor. In 1904, the village of Longaví was officially created and the commune was founded in 1937.

== Economy ==
Agriculture, in particular the cultivation of rice and other cereals, constitutes the main economic activity of Longaví.

== Administration ==
As a commune, Longaví is a third-level administrative division of Chile administered by a municipal council, headed by an alcalde who is directly elected every four years. The 2012-2016 alcalde is Mario Briones Araice (PPD).The municipal council has the following members:

- Matusalen Villar Morales(DC)
- Manuel San Martín Romero (RN)
- Robín Araya Acevedo (UDI)
- Luis Briones Araice (PRSD)
- Gonzalo Jara Reyes (PPD)
- Lisandro Villalobos Tapia (UDI)

Within the electoral divisions of Chile, Longaví is represented in the Chamber of Deputies by Guillermo Ceroni (PPD) and Ignacio Urrutia (UDI) as part of the 40th electoral district, together with Retiro, Parral, Cauquenes, Pelluhue and Chanco. The commune is represented in the Senate by Hernán Larraín UDI and Manuel Matta (PDC) as part of the 11th senatorial constituency (Maule-South).
