= Cherni Island =

Island in Aleutians East Borough, Alaska, United States

Coordinates: 54°38′11″N 162°22′07″W

Cherni Island is an island in the U.S. state of Alaska that lies 12 miles (20 km) south of Deer Island, about halfway between it and the Sanak Islands. All of the preceding islands lie off the south coast of the western part of the Alaska Peninsula, in the Aleutians East Borough.

The island was known as Chernabura Island until 1936, when its name was changed to Cherni Island to avoid confusion with a larger island known as Chernabura Island located in the Shumagin Islands 90 nautical miles (170 km; 100 mi) to the northeast.
