= Curanipe =

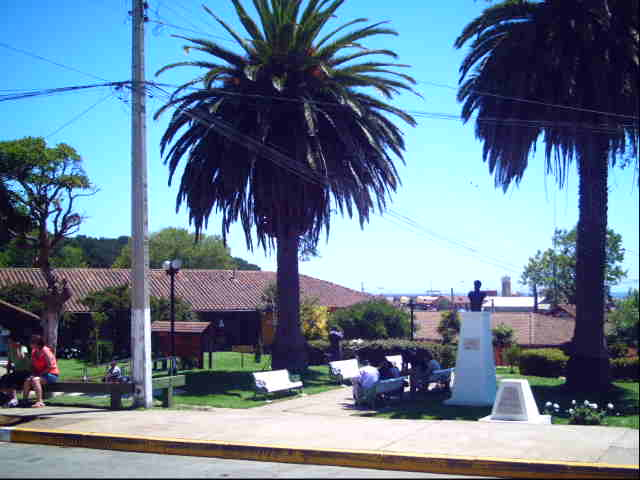
- Plaza de Curanipe
- Interactive map of Curanipe
- Coordinates: 35°50′39″S 72°38′3″W
- Country: Chile
- Region: Maule
- Province: Cauquenes
- Commune: Pelluhue
- Named for: "Black stone" in Mapudungun
- Elevation: 24 m (79 ft)
- Time zone: UTC-4

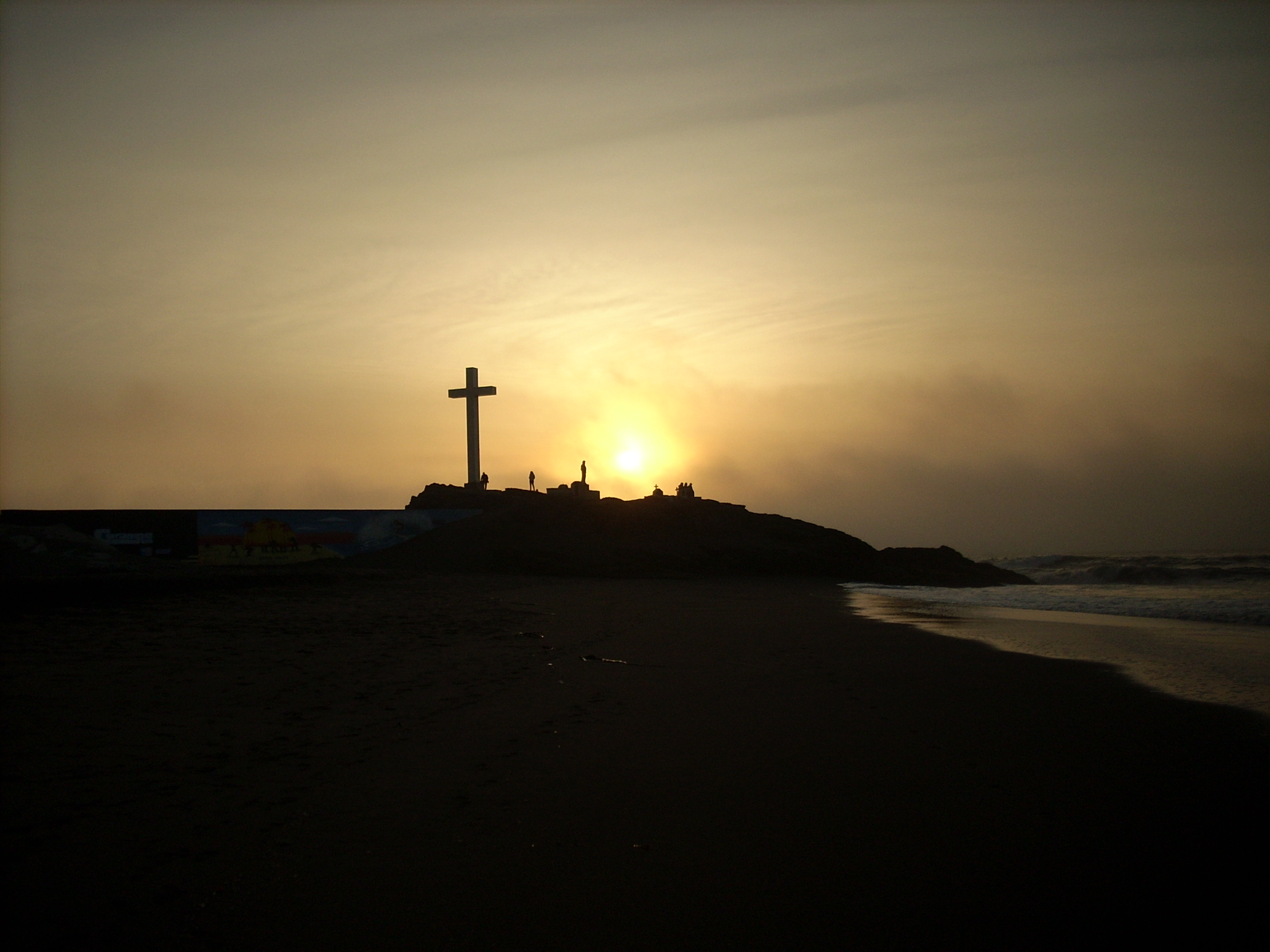
Sunset from the beach in Curanipe

Curanipe (in mapudungun: "plum tree that grows in the rock") is a town and seat of the municipality of Pelluhue, Province of Cauquenes, in VII Maule Region of Chile.

As a popular coastal resort, Curanipe used to be known as an exclusive hangout for the Cauquenes elite and a regional "minor port", during the mid- and late 19th century. The town has an architectural style that reminds the colonial rural architecture of Chile.

The Curanipe parish church of Santo Toribio, is a beautifully preserved religious building overlooking the town.

On 27 February 2010 at 06:34:14 GMT (03:34:14 AM local time), a magnitude 8.8 earthquake struck the seafloor 7 miles (11 km) southwest of Curanipe.
