= Parral, Chile =

Parral Villa Reina Luisa del Parral
- City and Commune
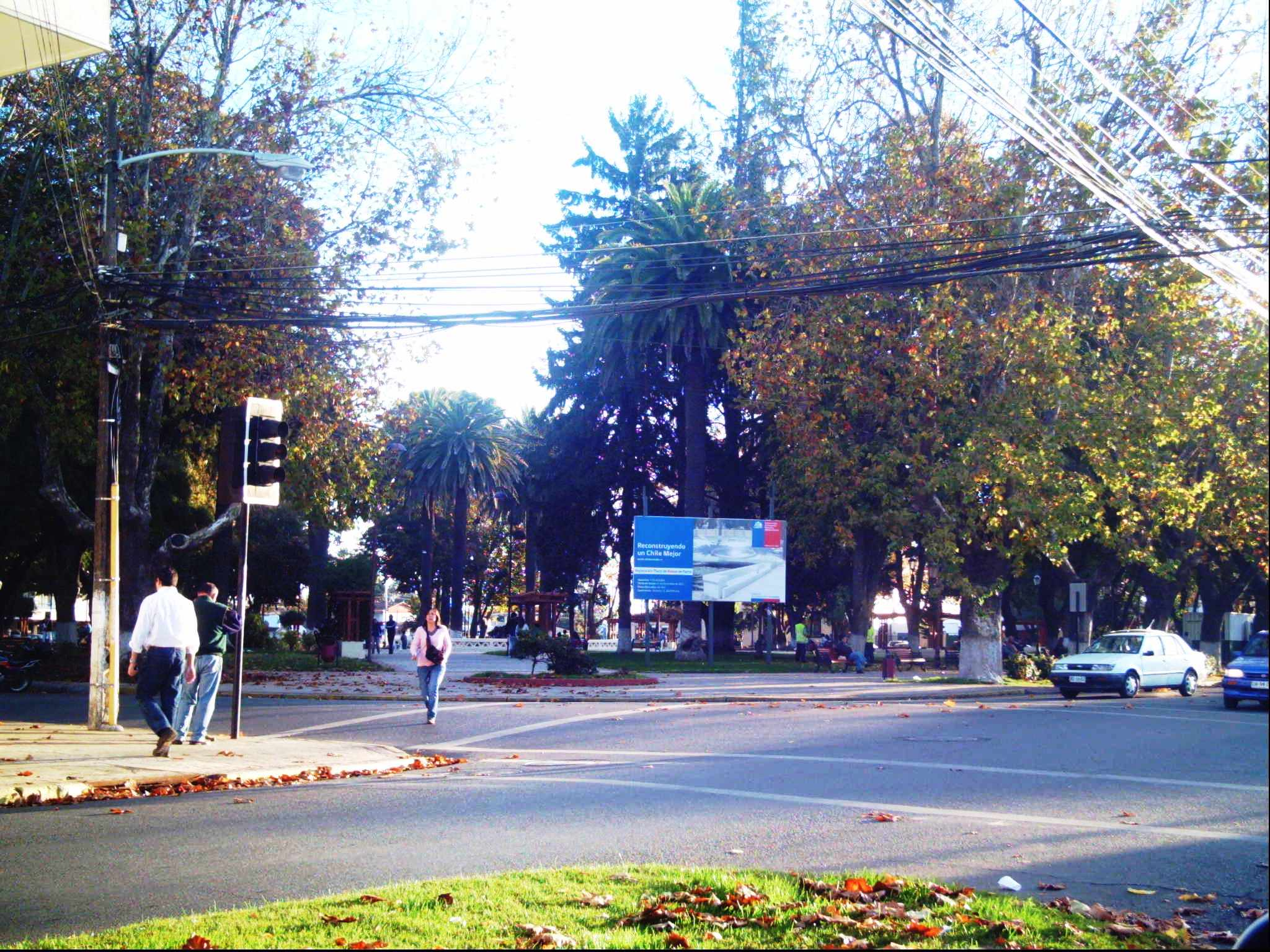

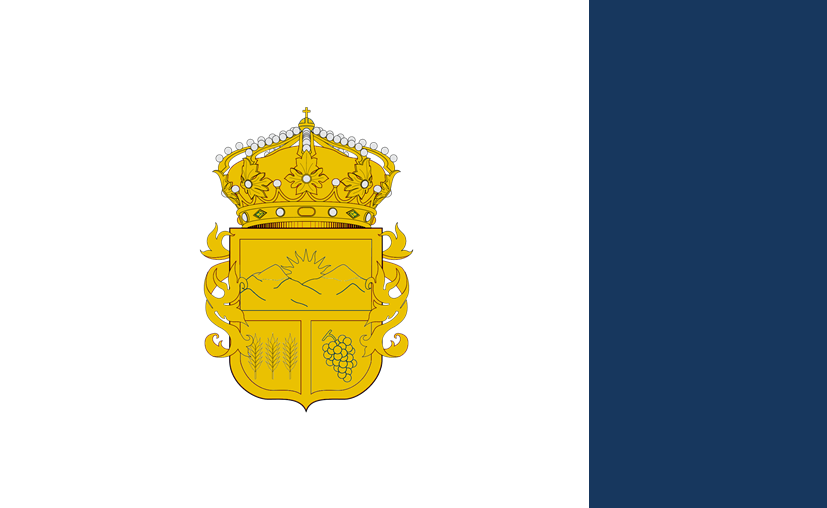
- Flag Coat of arms Location of the Parral commune in the Maule Region Location in Chile
- Coordinates (city): 36°09′S 71°50′W
- Country: Chile
- Region: Maule
- Province: Linares
- Founded: 1795
- Founder: Ambrosio O'Higgins
- Named for: Maria Luisa of Parma

Government
  - Type: Municipality
  - Alcalde: Paula Retamal Urrutia (PDC)

Area
  - Total: 1,638.4 km^{2} (632.6 sq mi)
- Elevation: 162 m (531 ft)

Population (2012 Census)
  - Total: 38,922
  - Density: 23.756/km^{2} (61.528/sq mi)
  - Urban: 26,397
  - Rural: 11,425

Sex
  - Men: 18,963
  - Women: 18,859
- Time zone: UTC-4 (CLT)
  - Summer (DST): UTC-3 (CLST)
- Postal code: 3630000
- Area code: 56 + 73
- Website: Official website (in Spanish)

Parral is a city and commune in the Linares Province of Chile's Maule Region.

== Geography ==
Parral is located 40 km (25 mi) south of Linares and 97 kilometers south of Talca, on the southern border of the Maule Region and Linares Province. Parral borders on the north with the communes of Longaví, Retiro and Colbún (with which it shares a short border in the cordillerana zone); on the west with the commune of Cauquenes (Cauquenes Province); on the south with the commune of Ñiquén and San Fabián and Ñuble Region); and on the east, with the commune of San Fabián.

The commune of Parral is 1,638.4 km^{2} (632.6 mi^{2}) in area. The river Perquilauquén forms its southern border.

== History ==
Parral was founded in 1795 by the Viceroy of Peru, Ambrosio O'Higgins. It was originally named Villa Reina Luisa del Parral in honor of the wife of Carlos IV, the King of Spain.

Parral is the birthplace of poet Pablo Neruda, winner of the Nobel Prize in Literature in 1971.

== Demography ==
The city of Parral is the second most populous city in Linares Province with a population of more than 26,000. According to the 2002 census, 26,397 (70.0%) live in urban areas and 11,425 (30.0%) in surrounding rural areas. The ratio of men to women is 101 to 100. Between the census of 1992 and that of 2002, the population of the municipality fell by 0.6% (245 people), exclusively in the rural population; the city of Parral grew by around 1,900 people (7.7%). Parral has welcomed immigration from Italy and Germany.

== Administration ==
As a commune, Parral is a third-level administrative division of Chile administered by a municipal council, headed by an alcalde who is directly elected every four years. The 2008-2012 alcalde is Israel Urrutia Escobar (PDC).

Within the electoral divisions of Chile, Parral is represented in the Chamber of Deputies by Guillermo Ceroni (PPD) and Ignacio Urrutia (UDI) as part of the 40th electoral district, together with Longaví, Retiro, Cauquenes, Pelluhue and Chanco. The commune is represented in the Senate by Hernán Larraín (UDI) and Ximena Rincón González (PDC) as part of the 11th senatorial constituency (Maule-South).

== Attractions ==
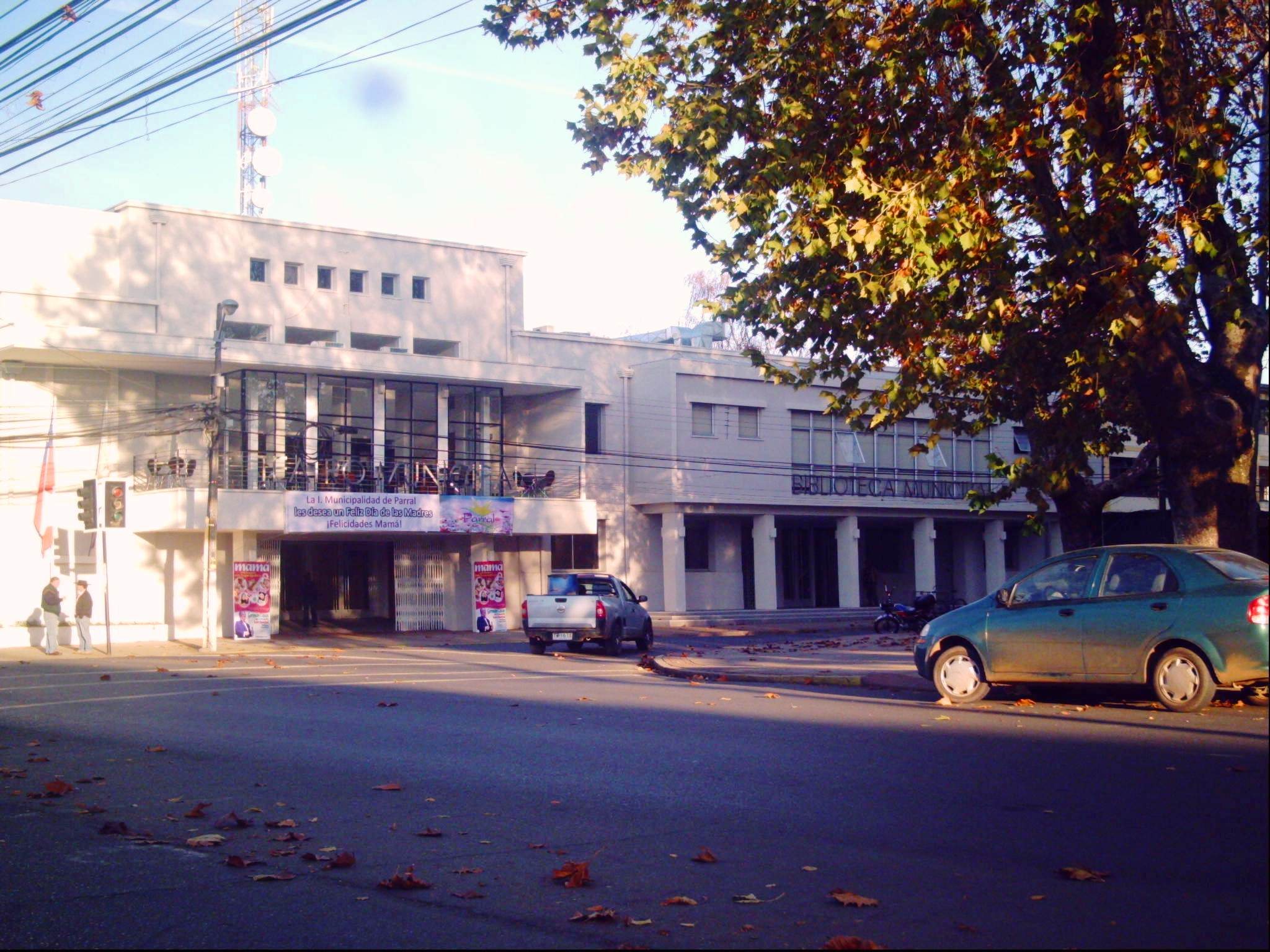
Theater and Public Library of Parral.

Natural and historical attractions in the area include:

- Termas de Catillo, thermal baths located 27 km (17 mi) east of Parral and 320 m (1,050 ft) above sea level, and the site of a 200-room hotel complex;
- The Digua Dam reservoir, a largely undeveloped recreational and fishing area;
- The Bullileo Dam reservoir and Laguna de Amargo recreational area;
- Fort Viejo, a recreational area and an archaeological site from the time of the Spanish colonization of the Americas (La Conquista);
- La Balsa, a recreational area near the Andes, with thermal baths nearby.

== See also ==
- Colonia Dignidad, about 40 km (25 mi) south-east of Parral.
