= Chanco, Chile =

Chanco
- Town and Commune
- Location of the Chanco commune in the Maule Region

- Location in Chile
- Coordinates (city): 36°16′S 72°43′W
- Country: Chile
- Region: Maule
- Province: Cauquenes
- Founded: July 3, 1849

Government
  - Type: Municipality
  - Alcalde: Viviana Díaz Mesa (RN)

Area
  - Total: 529.5 km^{2} (204.4 sq mi)
- As of 2002
- Elevation: 513 m (1,683 ft)

Population (2012 Census)
  - Total: 9,003
  - Density: 17.00/km^{2} (44.04/sq mi)
  - Urban: 4,012
  - Rural: 5,445
- Demonym: Chanquino

Sex
  - Men: 4,856
  - Women: 4,601
- Time zone: UTC-4 (CLT)
  - Summer (DST): UTC-3 (CLST)
- Postal code: 3720000
- Area code: 56 + 73
- Website: Municipality of Chanco

Chanco is a Chilean town and commune located in Cauquenes Province, Maule Region.

== Geography ==
Chanco is bordered on the north by Constitución and Empedrado (both in Talca Province); on the south by Pelluhue; on the east by Cauquenes, and on the west by the Pacific Ocean. The area of the municipality is 529.5 km^{2} (204 sq mi).

== Demography ==
According to the 2002 census of the National Statistics Institute, Chanco has 9,457 inhabitants (4,856 men and 4,601 women). Of these, 4,012 (42.4%) lived in urban areas and 5,445 (57.6%) in rural areas. Between the 1992 and 2002 censuses, the population fell by 0.4% (35 persons).

== History ==
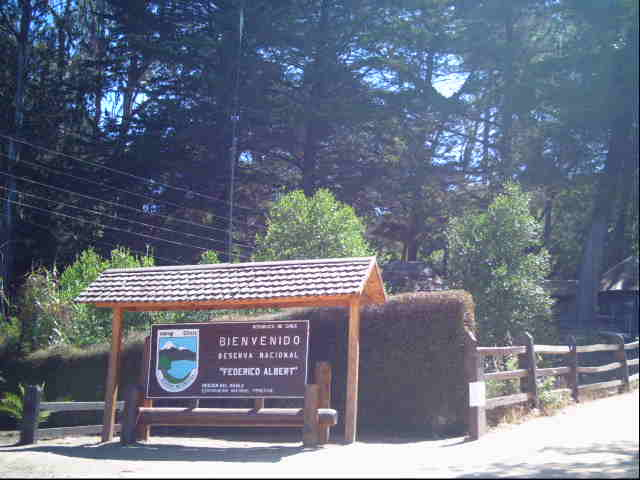
Access to Natural Reserve "Federico Albert"

Chanco was founded on 1889 in an old settlement populated by the indigenous people known as promaucaes. Chanco had begun as a seaside settlement. However, in the 19th century the coastal dunes advanced eastward and buried the old village and the surrounding crops. At the beginning of the 20th century, thanks to the efforts of the German botanist and naturalist Federico Albert the town was saved from being buried again, when Albert started a large-scale project by planting an extense forest west to Chanco and relocating the town eastwards. The forest would be declared a national reserve in 1979 and today it constitutes a frequented touristic attraction in the province of Cauquenes.

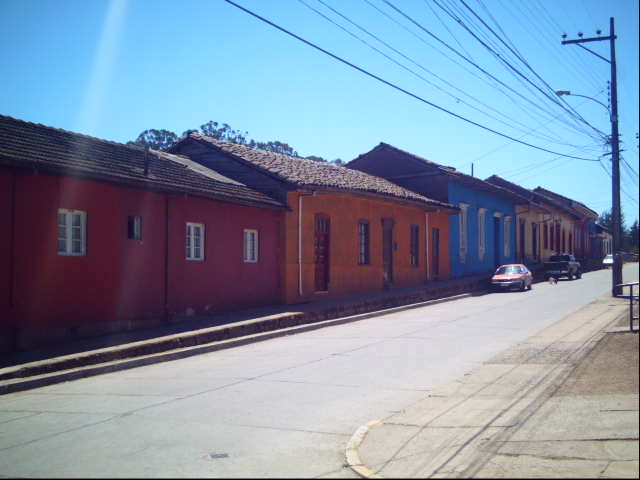
Houses in Chanco Town, in the "Typical Zone".

== Traditions and tourism ==
Chanco was declared "typical zone" in 1999, due to its neo-colonial style. A very popular annual celebration that takes place every February is a festival honoring the late singer Guadalupe of the Carmen (original name Esmeralda González), born in Quilhuiné, near Chanco, who was hugely popular in the region and, in general among Chilean peasants in the 'fifties and 'sixties as an interpreter of Mexican music. The festival, a true tribute to popular Mexican music, represents a major regional event.

== Administration ==
As a commune, Chanco is a third-level administrative division of Chile administered by a municipal council, headed by an alcalde who is directly elected every four years. The 2008-2012 alcalde is Viviana Díaz Mesa (RN).The municipal council has the following members:

- Gerassimo Moulas Vargas (UDI)
- Marcelo Waddington Guajardo (PRSD)
- Juan Díaz Mesa (RN)
- Mario Quiñones Cortés (PDC)
- Javier Cancino Ibáñez (RN)
- Hernán Muñoz Minchel (RN)

Within the electoral divisions of Chile, Chanco is represented in the Chamber of Deputies by Guillermo Ceroni (PPD) and Ignacio Urrutia (UDI) as part of the 40th electoral district, together with Longaví, Retiro, Parral, Cauquenes and Pelluhue. The commune is represented in the Senate by Hernán Larraín (UDI) and Ximena Rincón González (PDC) as part of the 11th senatorial constituency (Maule-South).
