= Jaime Naranjo =

Chilean politician (born 1951)

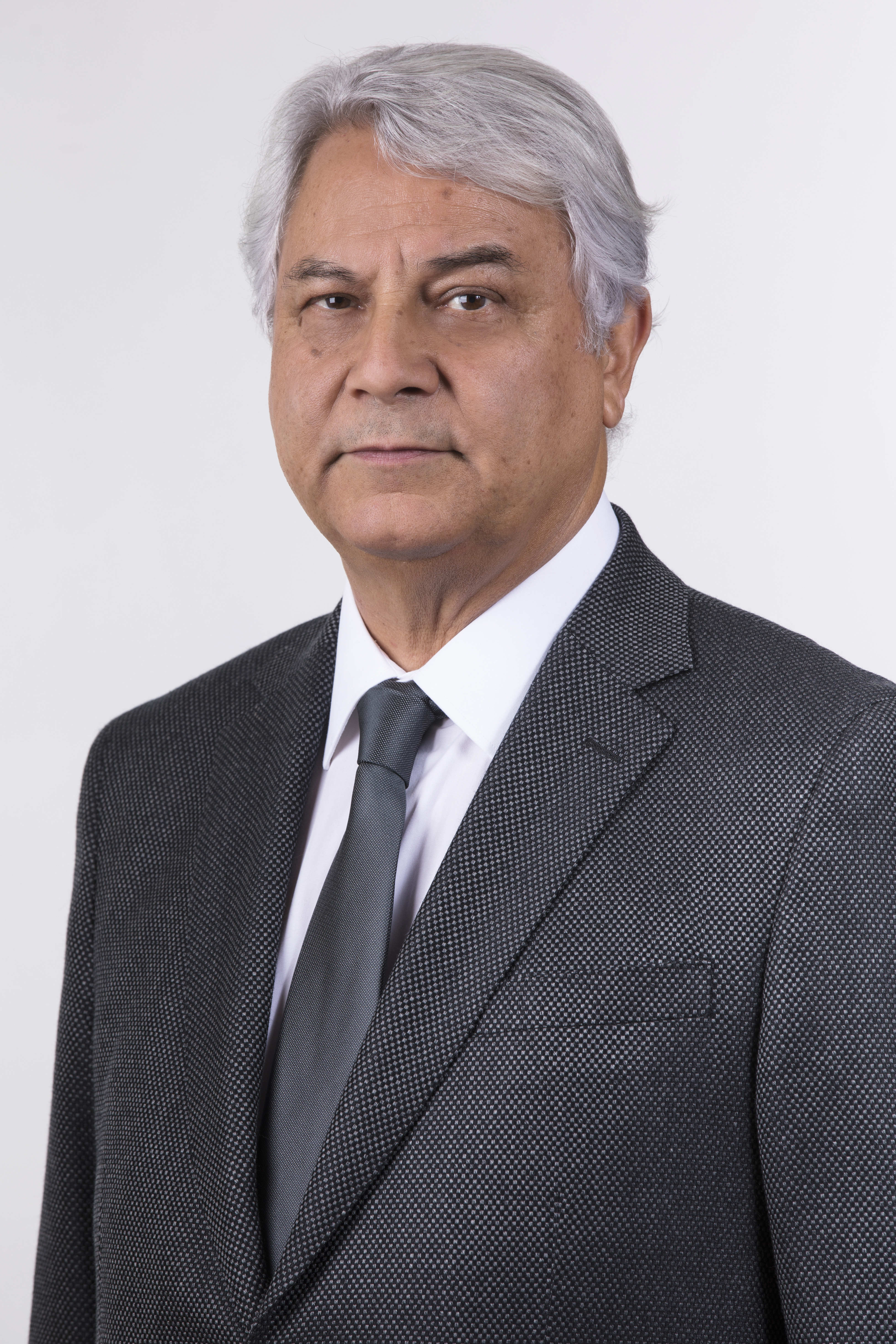

Member of the Chamber of Deputies
- In office 11 March 2018 – 11 March 2026
- Constituency: 18th District
- In office 11 March 1990 – 11 March 2002
- Preceded by: District created
- Succeeded by: Jorge Tarud
- Constituency: 39th District

Member of the Senate
- In office 11 March 2002 – 11 March 2010
- Preceded by: Manuel Matta Aragay
- Succeeded by: Ximena Rincón
- Constituency: 11th Circunscription

Personal details
- Born: 12 January 1951 (age 75) Melipilla, Chile
- Party: Christian Left (1985–1991); Socialist Party (1991–)
- Spouse: Beatriz Orellana
- Children: Five
- Education: Pontifical Catholic University of Valparaíso
- Occupation: Politician
- Profession: Agronomal engineer

Jaime César Naranjo Ortíz (born 12 September 1951) is a Chilean politician who served as member of parliament.

He served as a Deputy for the Maule Region in multiple non-consecutive terms between 1990 and 2026, and as a Senator for the Maule South constituency between 2002 and 2010. He was a long-time member of the Socialist Party of Chile before resigning in 2024.

An opponent of the second government of Sebastián Piñera (2018−2022), on 8 November 2021, he conducted a filibuster in favor of impeaching Piñera. The filibuster allowed Giorgio Jackson to vote, who had been quarantined for COVID, the 78th vote necessary for the initiative to pass to the Senate. Jackson arrived to the National Congress in Valparaíso around 01:25 AM, and quickly voted.

== Early life and education ==
Naranjo was born in Melipilla on 12 January 1951. He is married to Beatriz Orellana and has five children.

He completed his primary education at Colegio San Agustín in Melipilla and his secondary education at the Instituto Nacional in Santiago. He later studied agronomy at the Pontifical Catholic University of Valparaíso, graduating as an agricultural engineer in 1975. In 1980, he obtained a master's degree in Agricultural Economics from the Federal University of Rio Grande do Sul in Brazil.

== Professional and academic career ==
Between 1974 and 1975, Naranjo worked as a researcher at CIEPLAN at the Pontifical Catholic University of Chile. From 1976 to 1977, he was employed at INPROA, an institution linked to the Archdiocese of Santiago. Between 1980 and 1982, he worked for the Agricultural Transfer Company (ETA Ltda.) in the Illapel–Salamanca area.

Closely linked to the Catholic Church’s social initiatives, between 1980 and 1989 he worked in the Social Pastoral and collaborated with Bishop Carlos Camus of Linares, focusing on rural organization and training through the Department of Rural Action (DAR).

Naranjo also pursued an academic career. In 1980, he became a lecturer in Agricultural Economics at the Pontifical Catholic University of Valparaíso, a position he held for fifteen years. Between 2010 and 2012, he taught courses on Entrepreneurship and International Economic Treaties at the Central University of Chile. From 2010 to 2014, he taught Economics, Entrepreneurship, and International Economics at the University of Viña del Mar. Between 2014 and 2015, he served as a legislative advisor to the Ministry of Agriculture.

== Political career ==
Naranjo began his political activity in 1984, participating in the formation of Esperanza Campesina, an organization representing small agricultural producers. In 1985, he joined the Christian Left Party and was appointed director of its Lay Department. In 1986, he became president of the Human Rights Commission of Linares Province. In 1989, he contributed to the organization of rural wage workers and founded the Movement of Landless Workers and Peasants.

In the 1989 parliamentary elections, Naranjo was elected Deputy for District No. 39 in the Maule Region. He was re-elected for the same district for the 1994–1998 and 1998–2002 terms. In 1991, he joined the Socialist Party of Chile and the following year became a member of its Central Committee. He held several internal party positions, including National Secretary for Human Rights and member of the Political Commission across multiple periods between 1993 and 2006.

In the 2001 parliamentary elections, he was elected Senator for the Maule South constituency (11th senatorial district), serving from 2002 to 2010. He failed to secure re-election in the 2009 elections.

In 2013, Naranjo ran unsuccessfully for the Chamber of Deputies in District No. 39. In the 2017 parliamentary elections, he was elected Deputy for the 18th District of the Maule Region, representing the Socialist Party within the La Fuerza de la Mayoría pact. He was re-elected in the 2021 elections with the highest vote share in the district, representing the Socialist Party within the Nuevo Pacto Social coalition.

After more than three decades of membership, Naranjo resigned from the Socialist Party on 19 November 2024, citing internal political disagreements. In the 2025 parliamentary elections, he ran unsuccessfully as an independent candidate for the Senate in the Maule Region under the Green–Regionalist–Humanist pact.
