= Deer Island (Aleutian Islands) =

Coordinates: 54°55′00″N 162°18′56″W

Deer Island is an island located at the mouth of Cold Bay on the south side of the Alaska Peninsula in the state of Alaska in the United States. It lies about 5 miles (8.0 km) directly south of the mainland city of King Cove, across Deer Passage. The Sanak Islands lie to its south, and the Pavlof Islands to its northeast. The island has a land area of 151.7 km^{2} (58.57 sq mi) and is uninhabited.

Deer Island was known to the Aleuts as Itkhayak, meaning "deer". who were the only people to ever set foot on it. It is a hilly island with many creeks running through it. It is covered with plants and full of life in the spring and summer, but in winter it is covered in a blanket of snow.
