= Cauquenes Province =

Cauquenes Province Provincia de Cauquenes
- Province
- Seal

- Location in the Maule Region

- Location in Chile
- Coordinates: 35°57′S 72°19′W
- Country: Chile
- Region: Maule
- Capital: Cauquenes
- Communes: Cauquenes; Chanco; Pelluhue

Government
  - Type: Provincial

Area
  - Total: 3,027.2 km^{2} (1,168.8 sq mi)

Population (2024 Census)
  - Total: 60,822
  - Density: 20.092/km^{2} (52.038/sq mi)
- Time zone: UTC−4 (CLT)
  - Summer (DST): UTC-3 (CLST)
- Area code: 56 +
- Website: Governorate of Cauquenes

Cauquenes Province (Spanish: Provincia de Cauquenes) is one of four provinces of the Maule Region in Chile. It spans an area of 3,027.2 km^{2} (1,168.8 sq mi), and has its capital at the city of Cauquenes. It had a population of 60,822 inhabitants as per the 2024 Chilean census.

== History ==
The Maule Region was established in 1970. It is divided into four provinces–Cauquenes, Curicó, Linares, and Talca, which are further divided into 30 communes.

== Geography ==
Cauquenes Province is one of the four provinces of the Maule Region in Chile. It covers an area of 3,027.2 km^{2} (1,168.8 sq mi). About 60% of the land area belongs to the Maule River basin, with the remanining land majorly forming the coastline.

Cauquenes is located in the southern part of the Maule Valley, a wine making region in Chile. The region has clayey and pumice based soils, where red wine grapes are grown.

The province has a warm Mediterranean climate (Köppen climate classification: Csb) with an average annual temperature of 17.81 °C (64.06 °F). The region receives approximately 8.05 cm (3.17 in) of rainfall annually on average.

== Administration ==
As a province, Cauquenes is a second-level administrative division of Chile, governed by a provincial governor. It is further subdivided into three communes (comunas)– Cauquenes, Chanco and Pelluhue. Its capital is the city of Cauquenes.

== Demographics ==
According to the 2024 Chilean census, the province had a population of 60,822 inhabitants. The population consisted of 31,671 females (52.1%) and 29,151 males (47.9%). About 17.4% of the population was below the age of 15 years, 63.7% belonged to the age group of 15–64 years, and 18.9% was aged 65 years or older. The province had an urban population of 41,357 inhabitants (68%) and a rural population of 19,465 inhabitants (32%). Most of the residents were born in Chile, accounting for 59,837 inhabitants (98.4%). Non-indigenous people formed the majority of the population with 58,813 inhabitants (96.7%), while 2,007 inhabitants (3.3%) identified themselves as belonging to indigenous groups. Roman Catholics formed the largest religious group with 33,137 adherents (66.1%), followed by Evangelicals or Protestants with 8,880 adherents (17.7%), and 7,038 inhabitants (14%) indicating no religious affiliation.
