= Pelluhue =

- Town and Commune
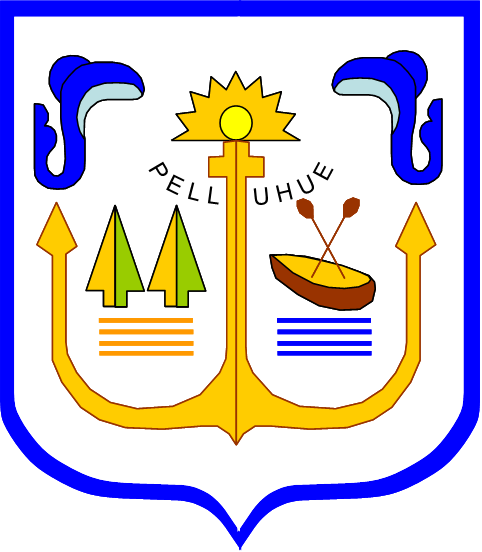
- Coat of arms Map of the Pelluhue commune in the Maule Region Location in Chile
- Coordinates (city): 35°48′S 72°34′W
- Country: Chile
- Region: Maule
- Province: Cauquenes

Government
  - Type: Municipality
  - Alcalde: Carlos Zúñiga Villaseñor (UDI)

Area
  - Total: 371.4 km^{2} (143.4 sq mi)
- Elevation: 11 m (36 ft)

Population (2012 Census)
  - Total: 6,620
  - Density: 17.8/km^{2} (46.2/sq mi)
  - Urban: 6,414
  - Rural: 3,877
- Demonym: Pelluhuano

Sex
  - Men: 3,408
  - Women: 3,006
- Time zone: UTC-4 (CLT)
  - Summer (DST): UTC-3 (CLST)
- Postal code: 3710000
- Area code: 56 + 73
- Website: www.munipelluhue.cl

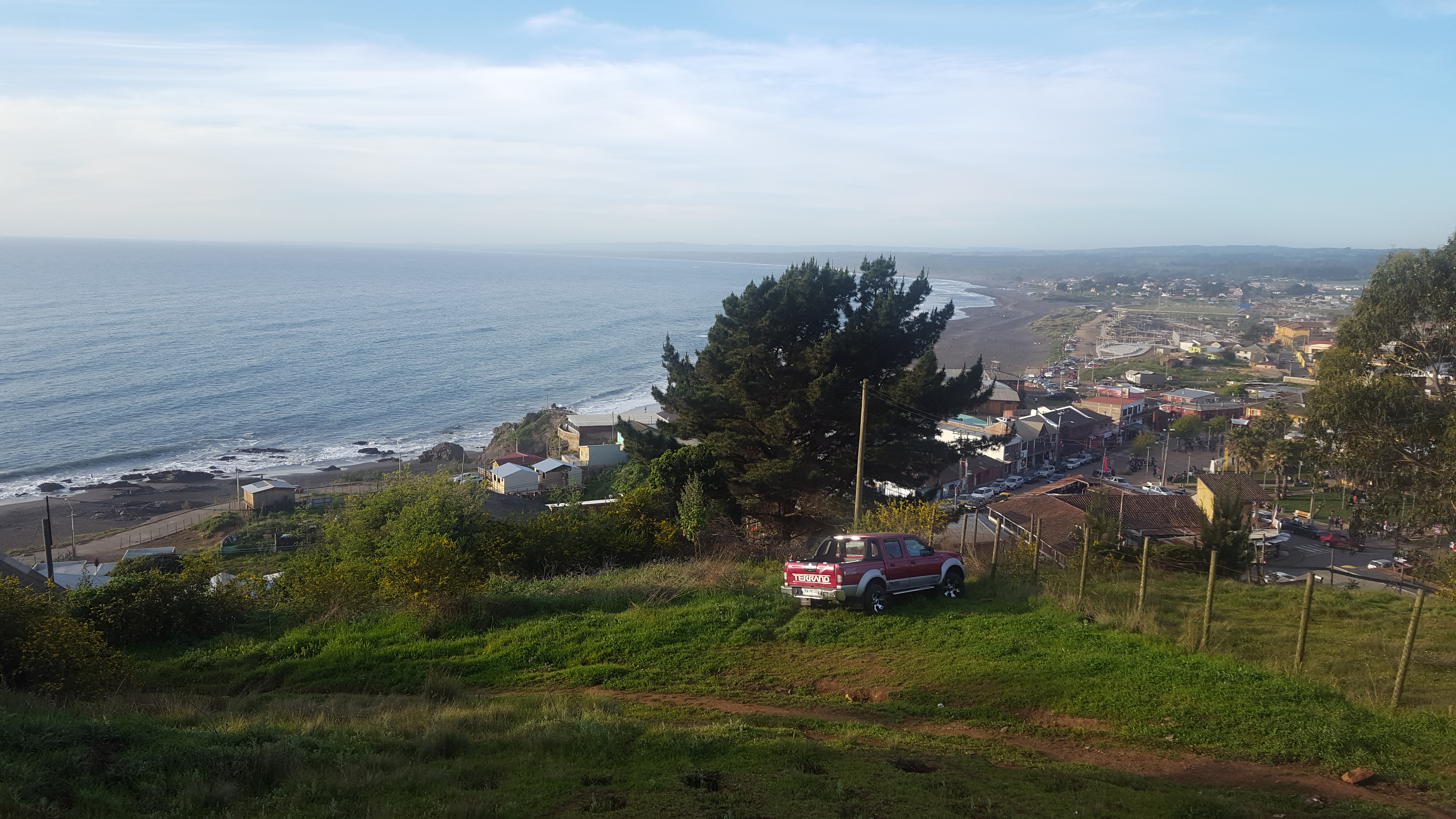
Fotografias

Pelluhue (in Mapudungun: land of clams) is a town and commune in the Cauquenes Province of central Chile's seventh region of Maule.

== Geography ==
The commune of Pelluhue has an area of 371.4 km^{2} (143 sq mi) and is bordered on the north by Chanco, on the south by Cobquecura (Ñuble Region), on the east by Cauquenes and on the west by the Pacific Ocean. Its seat is the town of Curanipe.

== Demography ==
Although Curanipe is the municipal seat, Pelluhue has a greater population, both permanent and seasonal. According to the 2002 census of the National Statistics Institute, Pelluhue spans an area of 371.4 km^{2} (143 sq mi) and has 6,414 inhabitants (3,408 men and 3,006 women). Of these, 3,877 (60.4%) lived in urban areas and 2,537 (39.6%) in rural areas. Because of its appeal as a tourism and retirement center, Pelluhue has been steadily growing over the last two decades. Its population increase rate has been one of the highest in the Maule Region, growing by 17.2% (943 persons) between the 1992 and 2002 censuses.

== History ==
Both towns, Pelluhue and Curanipe, are nowadays popular coastal resorts. Pelluhue evolved from a humble fishermen's cove to a crowded summer resort in less than 50 years. The town's population swells to over several thousand in the summer week-ends when vacationers from the hinterland (Cauquenes, Linares, Talca, Parral) visit the seaside.

Curanipe has a more "patrician" past, having been already a well-known and secluded coastal resort for the Cauquenes elite and a proud "minor port", in the mid- and late 19th century and early 20th century. Both Pelluhue and Curanipe were part of the municipality of Chanco until 1979. The municipality and commune (Spanish:comuna) of Pelluhue was officially created on October 26, 1979, when both towns, together with their adjacent territories, formed a new municipality.

The Curanipe parish church of Santo Toribio is a preserved religious building overlooking the town.

From the ecclesiastical point of view, Pelluhue belongs to the Parish of Curanipe, of the Diocese of Linares, Chile.

== Administration ==
As a commune, Pelluhue is a third-level administrative division of Chile administered by a municipal council, headed by an alcalde who is directly elected every four years. The 2008-2012 alcalde is Carlos Zúñiga Villaseñor (UDI).

Within the electoral divisions of Chile, Pelluhue is represented in the Chamber of Deputies by Guillermo Ceroni (PPD) and Ignacio Urrutia (UDI) as part of the 40th electoral district, together with Longaví, Retiro, Parral, Cauquenes and Chanco. The commune is represented in the Senate by Hernán Larraín (UDI) and Ximena Rincón González (PDC) as part of the 11th senatorial constituency (Maule-South).

== Attractions and tourism ==
In the southernmost corner of the municipality, which borders the Bío Bío Region, lies the semi-isolated beach of Tregualemu, next to which there are two old, large rural houses of Chilean colonial style.

Los Ruiles National Reserve is a nature reserve at the eastern edge of the municipality, located in the foothills of the Chilean Coast Range (Cordillera de la Costa). A small oasis next to the road that connects Chanco and Cauquenes, the park contains many native species of trees and plants. Several of them are unique to the region and some are in danger of extinction. The reserve has a surface of 29 hectares. There is a reception area, several picnic tables and two footpaths.

== Earthquake ==
On February 27, 2010, Pelluhue and Curanipe were partially destroyed by an earthquake measuring 8.8 on the moment magnitude scale, and its associated tsunami that left 60 ft fishing vessels in the streets, the towns "covered in mud" and hundreds of homes "completely gone", as reported by the press. Scores of bodies have been found in the area and an estimated 300 homes were destroyed in Pelluhue alone. The commune of Pelluhue lies close to the town of Cobquecura, the reported epicenter of the earthquake.
