= Sanak Islands =

Islands in Alaska, United States

Coordinates: 54°24′35″N 162°36′04″W

The Sanak Islands (Russian: Санак) are a subgroup of the Fox Islands group of islands, located in the Aleutians East Borough of Alaska.

== Geography ==
Located in the Gulf of Alaska, they are in the Aleutian Islands archipelago. The Sanak Islands have a total land area of 157.617 km^{2} (60.856 sq mi) and are unpopulated.

Caton Island and Sanak Island are the largest islands in the group. Others include small islets which are clustered around Sanak Island.

The islands are covered in native grasses, such as Lyme grass (Leymus arenarius).

== See also ==
- Islands of Aleutians East Borough, Alaska
