= Cauquenes =

- City and Commune
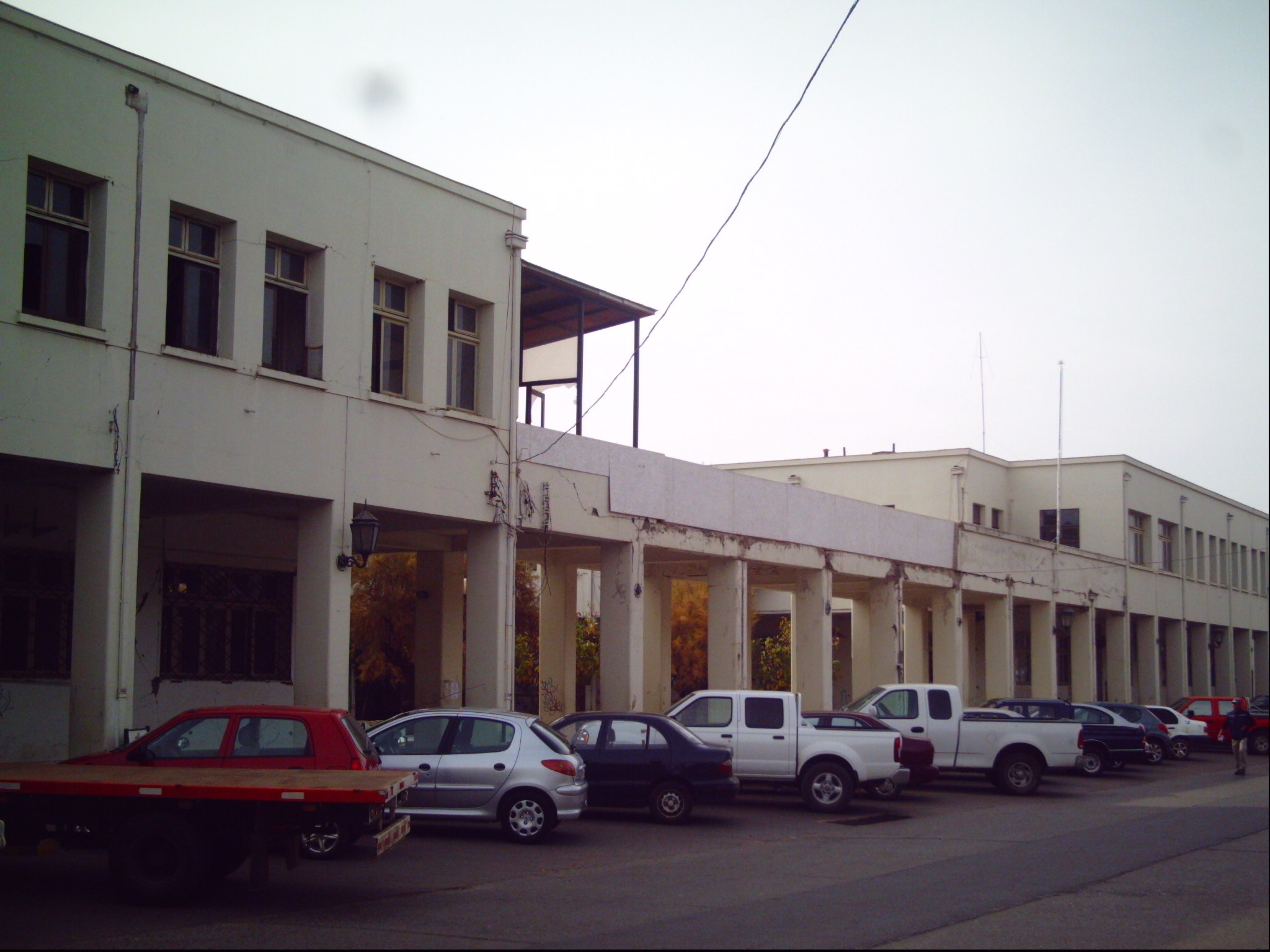

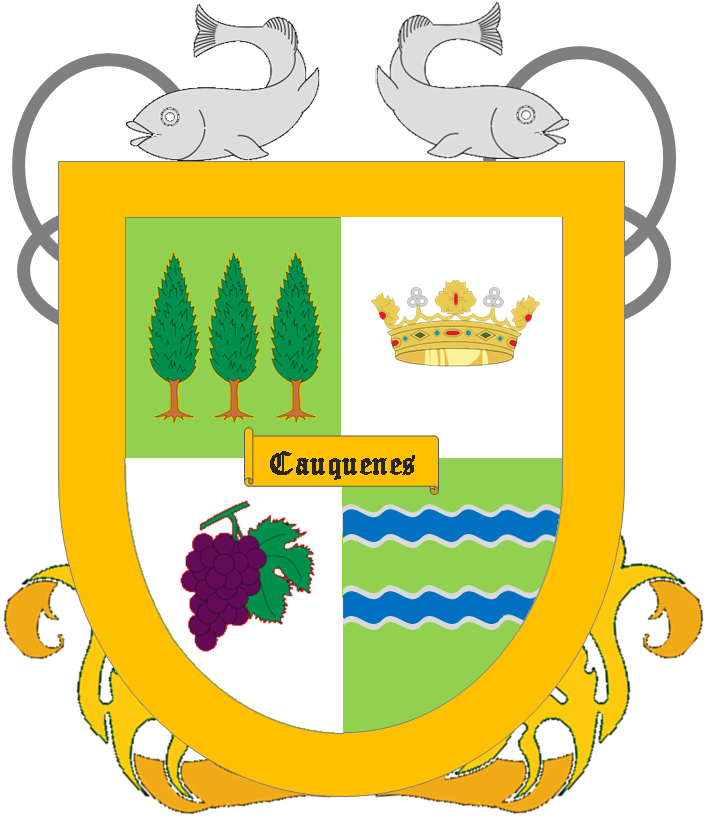
- Coat of arms Location of the Cauquenes commune in the Maule Region Location in Chile
- Coordinates: 35°58′S 72°21′W
- Country: Chile
- Region: Maule
- Province: Cauquenes
- Founded: 1742

Government
  - Type: Municipality
  - Alcalde: Jorge Muñoz Saavedra

Area
  - Total: 2,126.3 km^{2} (821.0 sq mi)
- As of 2002
- Elevation: 135 m (443 ft)

Population (2024 Census)
  - Total: 42,798
  - Density: 20.128/km^{2} (52.131/sq mi)
  - Urban: 33,114
  - Rural: 7,327
- Demonym: Cauquenino

Sex
  - Men: 20,295
  - Women: 22,503
- Time zone: UTC-4 (CLT)
  - Summer (DST): UTC-3 (CLST)
- Postal code: 3690000
- Area code: 56 + 73
- Climate: Csb
- Website: Official website (in Spanish)

Cauquenes, a city and commune in Chile, is the capital of the Cauquenes Province and is located in the Maule Region.

== Etymology ==
The name Cauquenes comes from the indigenous people of the same name mentioned by Alonso de Ercilla in the epic poem La Araucana. According to tradition, these people stopped the advance of the Incas at the Maule River before the period of the Spanish conquest of Chile (see Battle of the Maule). The name of the river that crosses the city is also believed to come from this indigenous group.

In turn, the name cauquenes may derive from the Mapudungun word cauqueñ, which referred to a freshwater duck (Bernicla poliocephala). This name may be related to the fact that the group organized their lives around the presence of freshwater and its resources, or because their activities were associated with bird hunting, collecting reeds (totora), and similar practices.

Other sources attribute the name to cauques, fish of the family Atherinopsidae that were abundant in nearby rivers, or to cauques, a type of seabird.

== History ==
According to the historical records of Alonso de Ercilla, Cauquenes was originally inhabited by an indigenous community of the Promaucaes, known as the Cauqui by the Inca or cauquenes by the Spanish and that gave their name to Cauquenes River. They lived to the south of the Maule River and north of the Itata River and owned a settlement in the place where the city lies today. The city of Cauquenes was founded on May 9, 1742, de "Villa of Nuestra Señora de las Mercedes de José de Manso del Tutuvén", in the land located between the rivers Tutuvén and Cauquenes, that the Promaucae cacique (chieftain) Ascensio Galdámez and his wife Micaela de Araya donated to the Kingdom of Spain. Cauquenes' founder was the then Governor of the Kingdom of Chile, José Antonio Manso de Velasco. The name of the city changed with time. With the law of 20 August 1826, which created the Maule Province, it became called "Villa de Cauquenes", and finally on 22 December of that year, it acquired the title of "Cauquenes".

Cauquenes is a toponym from the term "cauque", a salmonid species extinct today that inhabited the rivers of the area.

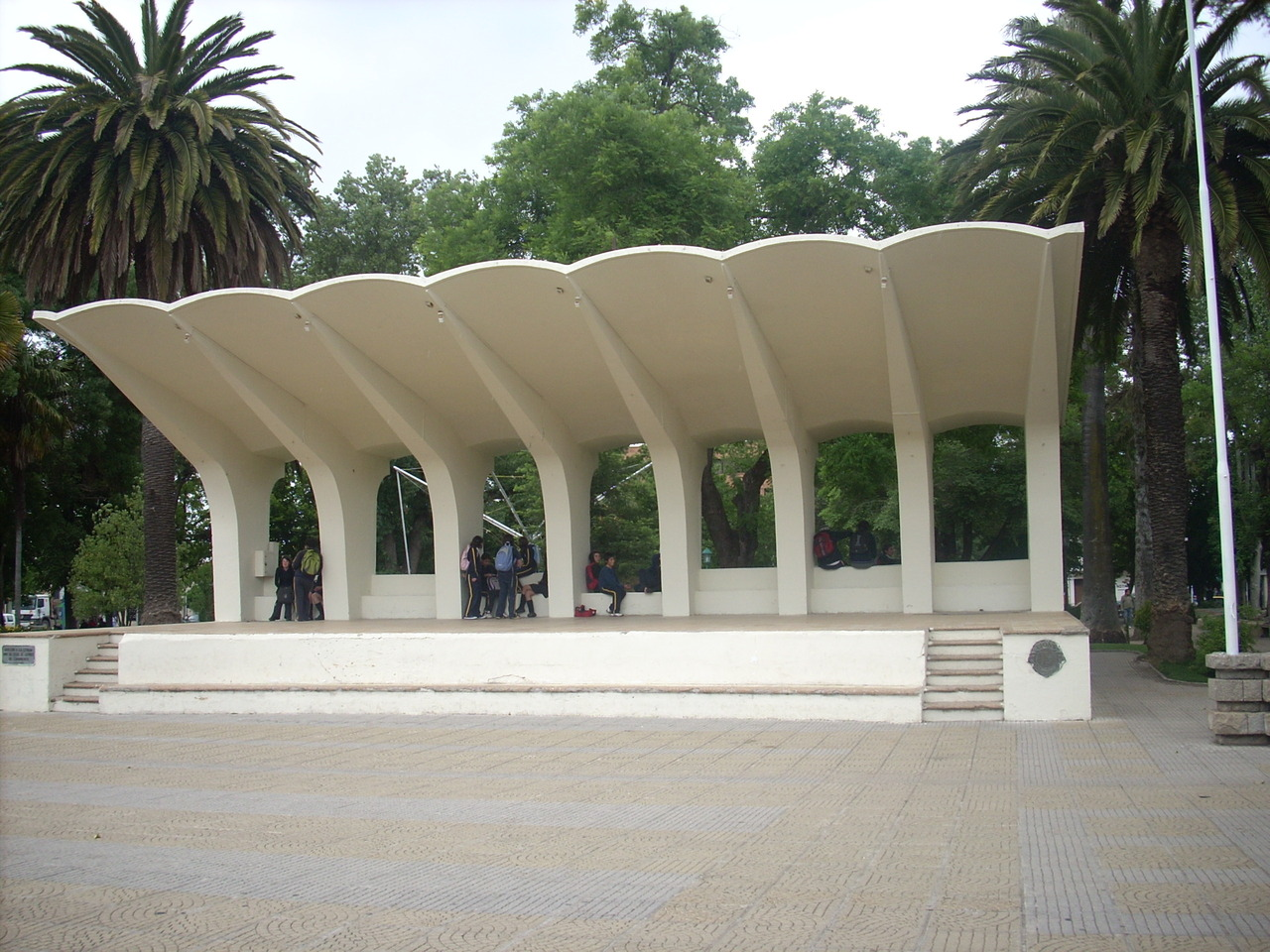
Kiosk in the Central Square of Cauquenes.

=== 27 February 2010 earthquake ===
Cauquenes was damaged by the 8.8 magnitude earthquake and subsequent tsunami. Restoring power in the city in the immediate aftermath was impossible because of damage from the tsunami.

== Demography ==
According to the 2024 census of the National Statistics Institute, Cauquenes spans an area of 2,126.3 km^{2} (821 sq mi) and has 42,798 inhabitants (20,295 men and 22,503 women). Of these, 33.114 (82%) lived in urban areas and 7,327 (18%) in rural areas. Between the 2017 and 2024 censuses, the population grew by 5.8% (2,357 persons).

Other localities in the commune of Cauquenes include the following:

- Sauzal, pop: 521
- Quella, pop: 346
- Santa Sofía, pop: 612

== Geography ==
- Altitude: 136 metres (446 ft)
- Latitude: 35° 58' S
- Longitude: 072° 21' W

== Administration ==
As a commune, Cauquenes is a third-level administrative division of Chile administered by a municipal council, headed by an alcalde who is directly elected every four years. The 2024-2028 alcalde is Jorge Eduardo Muñoz Saavedra (IND).The municipal council has the following members:

- Matías Ceballos Pradenas (UDI)
- Nelson Rodríguez Gallardo (PR)
- Ignacio Rodríguez Villablanca (IND)
- Matías Castro Valdés (PS)
- Grace Meza Cancino (IND)
- Alvaro Apablaza Apablaza (IND)

Within the electoral divisions of Chile, Cauquenes is represented in the Chamber of Deputies by Jaime Naranjo (PS), Paula Labra (RN), Consuelo Veloso (RD) and Gustavo Benavente (UDI) as part of the 18th electoral district. The commune is represented in the Senate Juan Castro Prieto (PSC), Juan Antonio Coloma (UDI), Rodrigo Galilea Vial (RN), Ximena Rincón Gonzaléz (PD) and Paulina Vodanovic Rojas (PS) as part of the 9th senatorial constituency (Maule).

== Climate ==
Climate data for Cauquenes
Month	Jan	Feb	Mar	Apr	May	Jun	Jul	Aug	Sep	Oct	Nov	Dec	Year
Mean daily maximum °C (°F)	29.2 (84.6)	28.3 (82.9)	26.6 (79.9)	22.3 (72.1)	17.8 (64.0)	13.8 (56.8)	13.5 (56.3)	14.7 (58.5)	17.5 (63.5)	19.5 (67.1)	23.6 (74.5)	26.3 (79.3)	21.1 (70.0)
Daily mean °C (°F)	22.0 (71.6)	20.2 (68.4)	21.6 (70.9)	14.6 (58.3)	13.9 (57.0)	9.8 (49.6)	8.7 (47.7)	9.8 (49.6)	11.6 (52.9)	13.6 (56.5)	18.1 (64.6)	19.9 (67.8)	15.3 (59.6)
Mean daily minimum °C (°F)	12.8 (55.0)	11.6 (52.9)	9.9 (49.8)	7.7 (45.9)	6.3 (43.3)	5.2 (41.4)	4.0 (39.2)	3.8 (38.8)	5.0 (41.0)	6.4 (43.5)	8.8 (47.8)	11.2 (52.2)	7.7 (45.9)
Average precipitation mm (inches)	8.1 (0.32)	6.5 (0.26)	15.5 (0.61)	36.8 (1.45)	110.3 (4.34)	153.3 (6.04)	131.4 (5.17)	97.2 (3.83)	56.9 (2.24)	29.5 (1.16)	15.8 (0.62)	9.5 (0.37)	670.8 (26.41)
Source: Meteorología Interactiva
