= Daniel Rebolledo Sepúlveda =

Chilean Army sergeant

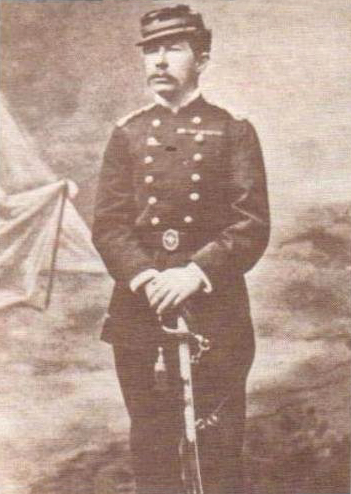

Daniel Rebolledo Sepúlveda (October 5, 1848 – January 22, 1908) was a Chilean Army sergeant, who fought in the War of the Pacific.

== Early life ==
Daniel Rebolledo Sepúlveda was born in the village of Rari, near Panimávida, on the banks of the Putagán river in the province of Linares. His parents were Melchor Rebolledo and Teresa Sepúlveda. In charge of his education was his uncle Pedro Rebolledo, a resident of Villa Alegre.

== Career ==
He entered the Army on August 20, 1873. He was promoted to corporal 2nd on November 12, 1874, and to Corporal 1st on July 14, 1877, while serving in the Cazadores a Caballo Regiment during the campaigns in the Araucanía; rank with which he temporarily retired in 1878. The following year he rejoined the ranks, this time in the 1st Line Regiment "Buin" with the rank of Cabo 1º.

He participated in the Occupation of Antofagasta and in the Tarapacá Campaign. He participated in the Landing and combat of Pisagua and in the Battle of Dolores (1879). After the Battle of Tacna and assault and capture of Morro de Arica he received the rank of sergeant 2nd.

He also participated in the Lima Campaign, during the Battle of Chorrillos (January 1881) that would culminate in the occupation of Lima.

Seeing the impossibility of the Atacama and Santiago Battalions to reduce the defenders of Morro Solar, Lieutenant Stuven told the troops of the Buin Regiment, which was called to reinforce Lynch's Division, forcing it to cross behind of the Chorrillos line of trenches, from their position, to the town. The order of the Minister of War offered two more chevrons to the officer and the captain's insignia to the man who placed the Chilean flag on the top of the nose, which Sergeant Rebolledo achieved. Thus he received the rank of Army Captain, achieved in full action, a rank with which he would proudly return to Chile, after having demobilized the First Battalion of his regiment.

He participated as (Sergeant) Major of the Army in the Revolution of 1891 supporting the government of President Balmaceda, being seriously wounded in the face during the battle of Concón, from where he was transferred to an improvised blood hospital that was set up in a hotel in Quilpué, center of Balmacedista operations.

== Death ==
He died on January 20, 1908, at the age of 60.

In 2001 his remains were transferred to the mausoleum built in front of the School of NCOs of the Chilean Army, which today bears his name.

== Bibliography ==
- Reyno Gutierrez, Manuel; Gonzales Salinas, Edmund; Rojas Valdes, Ximena (February 1987). Gallery of Chilean men-at-arms, period of French influence 1826-1885. Vol. II. Santiago de Chile: Army General Staff.
- From Maule to San Juan, Biographical review, epic feat and historical legacy of SG2. José Daniel Rebolledo Sepúlveda
