= Putagán River =

River in Chile

Coordinates: 35.77193°S 71.66442°W

Maule cuenca

Putagán (in mapudungun: "water stream") is a river in Linares Province, Maule Region of Chile. The Putagán is born in the foothills of the Andes and, flowing from east to west, passes south of the village of the same name. Along its course, the river contributes to form the northern border of the municipality of Linares with the following municipalities (from east to west): Colbún, Yerbas Buenas and Villa Alegre, before joining the Loncomilla river.
