= Putagán, Chile =

Village in Linares Province, Chile

Coordinates: 35°46′S 71°40′W

Putagán
- Location in Chile
- Country: Chile
- Region: Maule Region
- Province: Linares Province
- Municipality: Villa Alegre
- Elevation: 112 m (367 ft)

Population
  - Total: 622
- Time zone: UTC−4
  - Summer (DST): UTC−3

Putagán (in mapudungun: "water stream") is a village in the Chilean municipality of Villa Alegre, Province of Linares, Maule Region. Pop. 622. Altitude (meters) 112. Time zone (est) UTC−4(-3DT). Located 292 Kilometers (182 miles) south of Santiago. Its economy is based around agricultural activities like vineyards, rice, corn plantations, and lately berries for the European markets.

Putagán is considered one of the oldest Spanish settlements in what is now the Maule Region. Around 1580, the then Bishop of Santiago de Chile, Fray Diego de Medellín, created two missions south of the Maule River that remained under the jurisdiction of the Santiago bishops for more than 170 years. The missions were Cauquenes and Putagán. The parish of Putagán was transferred to Linares, after the latter's foundation and is now the main parish of Linares Diocese, "El Sagrario", based on the Cathedral church of the diocese.

Between 1913 and 1954 Putágan was the starting point of the narrow gauge Putagán—Colbún railway terminating in the city of Colbún. The railway played a significant role in transporting agricultural goods from Putagán to other parts of the Maule Region.

The Putagán River passes south of the village and forms the border of the municipalities of Villa Alegre and Linares. The village has a Mediterranean climate, characterized by warm, dry summers and mild, wet winters.
