= Ángel Custodio Quintana =

Ángel Custodio Quintana Lineros (October 2, 1865 – August 12, 1929) was a Chilean lawyer and public servant.

Quintana Lineros was born in Loncomilla. His parents were Juan José Quintana Araya and María Lorenza Lineros Sotomayor.

Ángel Custodio Quintana Lineros was married to Mercedes Elena Aylwin Gajardo (Aunt of the Chilean former president Patricio Aylwin Azócar) and was father to eighteen children: Carlos (1894-?), Guillermo, Laura Elena (Nun of the Order of the Good Shepherd) (1897-?), Humberto (Doctor) (1898-1975), María, Ester, Alberto, Arturo (Engineer) (1902-?), Rebeca (1904-?), Sara (Nun of the Order of Discalced Carmelites) (1905-?), Raquel (1907-?), Juan José (Doctor) (1908-?), Ricardo (23/05/1910 (San Javier) - 22/01/1978 (Talca)) (Lawyer and Member of Congress in the 1953-1957 legislature), Alfredo, Juan de Dios, Jorge (1915-?), Marta (1918-?) and Héctor (29/05/1919-?).

Their studies began at the Liceo of Linares, followed at the Liceo of Talca and ended at the Instituto Nacional. He studied law at the University of Chile and qualified as a lawyer on April 19, 1888. Addicted to literature, he belonged to several societies of belles lettres, including being a corresponding member of the Luis Miguel Amunátegui Literary Circle (Circulo Literario Miguel Luis Amunátegui) in 1888.

That year, Quintana was appointed secretary and solicitor of the municipality of San Javier, Chile. There, he served as assistant captain of the civic brigade. In 1889 he was appointed member of the Supervisory Board of Prisons (Junta de Vigilancia de Prisiones). In 1891 he was appointed notary public and register of deeds, a position he held until the overthrow of President José Manuel Balmaceda in the 1891 Chilean Civil War. This year he was elected alderman of the Municipality of San Javier.

During the course of the Civil War, Quintana served as secretary of the military court that sentenced the Putagán montoneros to death, who had tried to blow up the railway bridge to prevent the Concepción military division from reaching the battles of Concón and Placilla. He was doggedly pursued by the victorious revolutionaries, and was acquitted by the Court of Appeals of Talca. In 1892, he was elected director of the Liberal-Democratic Party of the Department of Loncomilla and secretary of the board of that community. In 1893 he was elected alderman of the municipality in that department. In 1895, he was reelected director of his party. In 1896, he was Loncomilla's delegate to the Liberal-Democratic Party Convention in Talca, in which the liberalism that had been forced from power in the Civil War was restored. In 1896 he was elected as the municipality of San Javier's first mayor.
