= Linares, Chile =

Linares Linarense
- City and Commune
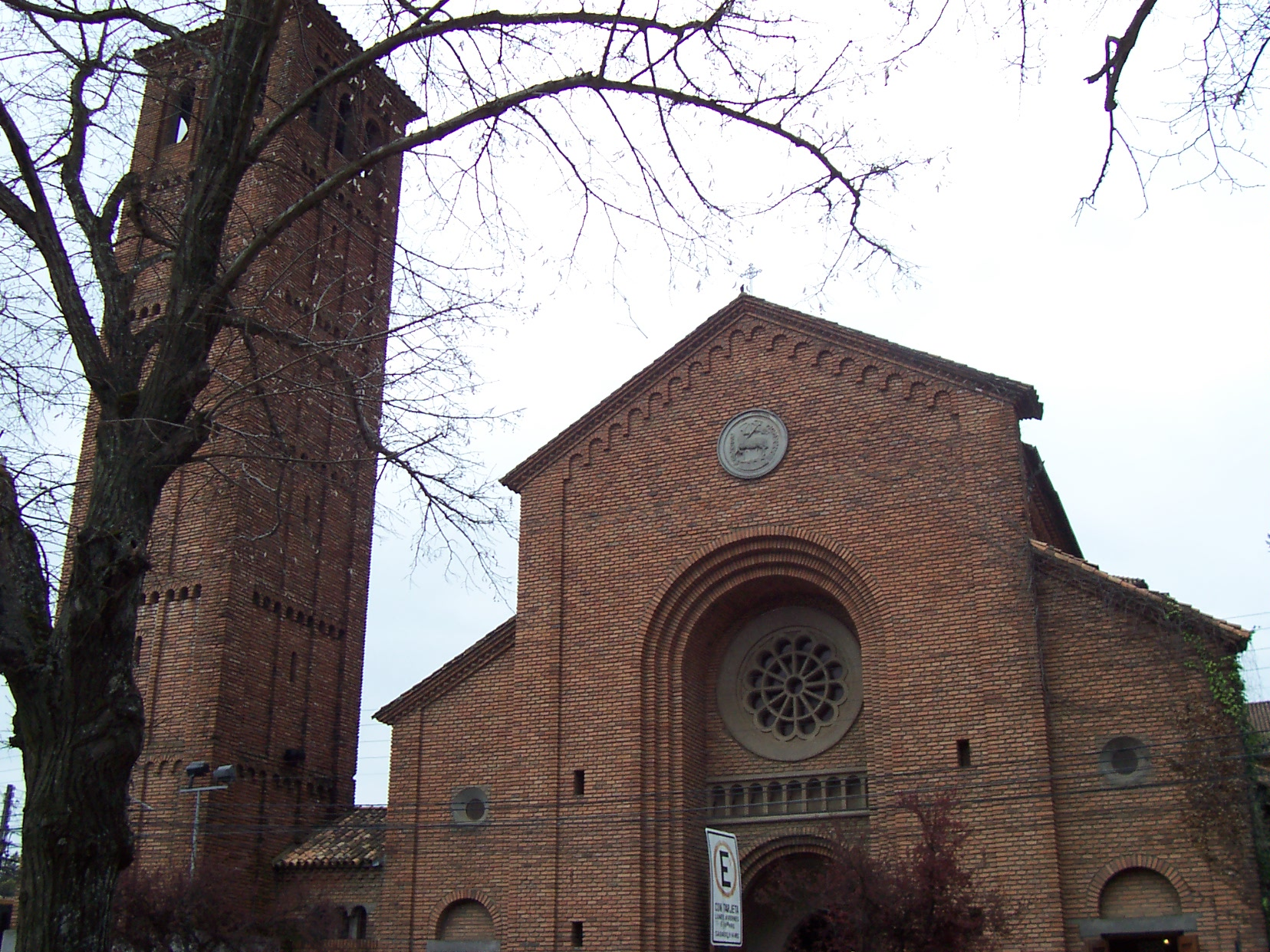
- Cathedral of Linares

- Flag Coat of arms Location in the Maule Region Location in Chile
- Coordinates: 35°51′S 71°36′W
- Country: Chile
- Region: Maule
- Province: Linares
- Founded: May 23, 1794
- Founded as: Villa de San Ambrosio de Linares

Government
  - Type: Municipality
  - Alcalde: Mario Meza Vasquez

Area
  - Total: 1,456.7 km^{2} (562.4 sq mi)
- Elevation: 165 m (541 ft)

Population (2012 census).
  - Total: 120,716
  - Density: 82.869/km^{2} (214.63/sq mi)
  - Urban: 10,000
  - Rural: 20,716
- Demonym: Linarense

Sex
  - Men: 55000
  - Women: 65000
- Time zone: UTC-4 (CLT)
  - Summer (DST): UTC-3 (CLST)
- Postal code: 3580000
- Area code: 56 + 73
- Climate: Csb
- Website: Official website (in Spanish)

Linares is a Chilean city and commune in the Maule Region. It lies in the Chilean Central Valley, 303 km (188 mi) south of Santiago and 50 km (31 mi) south of Talca, the regional capital. It is the capital city of the province of Linares.

== Demographics ==
According to the 2002 census of the National Statistics Institute, Linares covers an area of 1,456.7 km^{2} (562 sq mi) and has 83,249 inhabitants (40,518 men and 42,731 women). Of these, 68,224 (82%) lived in urban areas and 15,025 (18%) in rural areas. The population grew by 7.7% (5,933 people) between the 1992 and 2002 censuses.

== Geography ==
The municipality covers an area of 1,466 km^{2} (566 sq mi) and the city proper, 16 km^{2} (6 sq mi). The rivers Ancoa, Putagán and Achibueno are the main rivers that pass through the municipality or form its natural borders.

Most of the territory of the municipality is located within the Chilean Central Valley. Some low altitude hills are located in the westernmost part of the municipality, while its easternmost part is marked by the presence of the foothills of the Andes mountains. The municipality of Linares is bordered on the west by San Javier; on the north by Villa Alegre, Yerbas Buenas and Colbún; on the east, by Colbún, and on the south, by Longaví. The municipality of Colbún occupies the easternmost strip of the province, where some of the highest provincial peaks are located, as are the sources of several of the main rivers.

The city of Linares contains a large urban wetland known as Ayüwün, of which 1.1 hectares are protected under the Urban Wetlands Law.

== Climate ==
Linares has a mild mediterranean climate (Köppen: Csb). The summers are warm and mainly dry (November to March) with temperatures reaching up to 32 -33 degrees Celsius on the hottest days. The winters (late May to mid September) tend to be rather humid and rainy, with typical maximum daily temperatures of 14-15 degrees Celsius, and minimum just above freezing.

Climate data for Linares
Month	Jan	Feb	Mar	Apr	May	Jun	Jul	Aug	Sep	Oct	Nov	Dec	Year
Mean daily maximum °C (°F)	29.5 (85.1)	28.4 (83.1)	25.0 (77.0)	20.2 (68.4)	15.1 (59.2)	12.2 (54.0)	12.2 (54.0)	13.7 (56.7)	16.8 (62.2)	20.2 (68.4)	23.4 (74.1)	27.2 (81.0)	20.3 (68.6)
Daily mean °C (°F)	21.0 (69.8)	19.9 (67.8)	16.8 (62.2)	13.3 (55.9)	10.6 (51.1)	8.3 (46.9)	7.9 (46.2)	8.7 (47.7)	10.9 (51.6)	13.8 (56.8)	16.3 (61.3)	19.4 (66.9)	13.9 (57.0)
Mean daily minimum °C (°F)	12.3 (54.1)	11.7 (53.1)	9.4 (48.9)	7.0 (44.6)	6.6 (43.9)	5.4 (41.7)	4.3 (39.7)	4.3 (39.7)	5.6 (42.1)	7.8 (46.0)	9.4 (48.9)	11.5 (52.7)	7.9 (46.3)
Average precipitation mm (inches)	13.7 (0.54)	10.8 (0.43)	21.2 (0.83)	70.7 (2.78)	188.4 (7.42)	206.9 (8.15)	186.5 (7.34)	129.6 (5.10)	82.3 (3.24)	42.7 (1.68)	35.7 (1.41)	18.6 (0.73)	1,007.1 (39.65)
Average relative humidity (%)	62	65	70	79	88	91	89	86	81	76	70	64	77
Source: Bioclimatografia de Chile

== History and current status ==
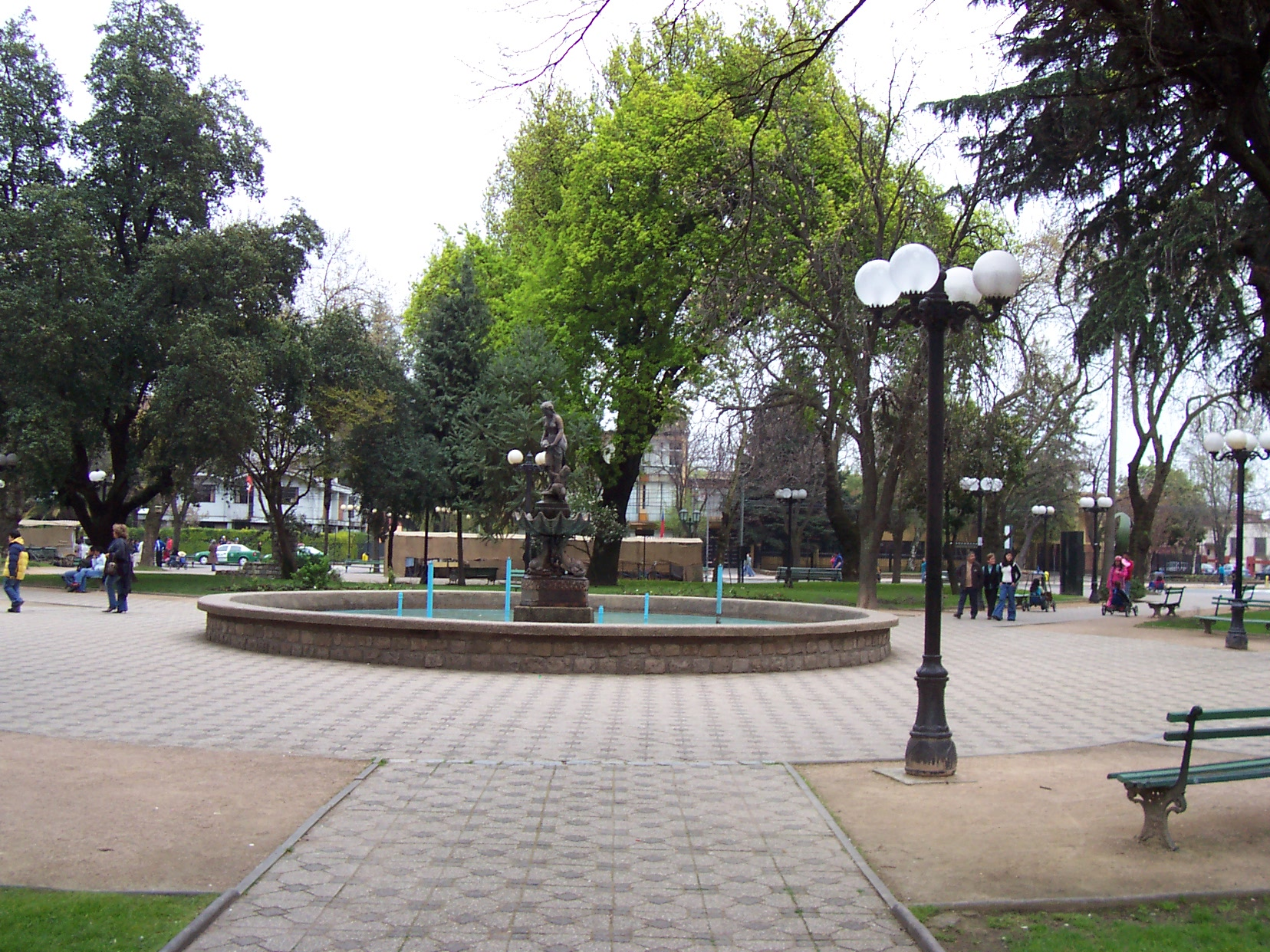
Main Square, Linares, Chile

Linares was founded on May 23, 1794, as the "Villa de San Ambrosio de Linares" by Ambrosio O'Higgins, the then Viceroy of Peru and Bernardo O'Higgins's father. The city counts among its natives important statesmen, politicians, poets, writers, and musicians and is an active commercial, agricultural, industrial, and service center.

The city of Linares houses the artillery school of the Chilean Army.

From 1913 to 1954 Linares had a station on the narrow gauge Putagán—Colbún railway line between Linares and Colbún.

== Religion ==
According to the 2002 census of the municipality of Linares, 75.41% (or 45,987 persons) of the total population aged 15 and older identified themselves as Roman Catholic; 15.74% described themselves as evangelical Protestants; and 0.61% as Jehovah's Witnesses. Additionally, 2.00% of the total population aged 15 and older identified themselves as Mormons, approximately 2.59% declared themselves followers of other religions, and 4.95% of the population declared themselves atheist or agnostic.

Linares is a see of a diocese of the Roman Catholic Church, with nine active parishes and many chapels in the comuna. There are also many churches that serve the various Protestant denominations and places of worship for Jehovah's Witnesses or Mormons.

== Main sights ==
The city and its surroundings have many attractions, for example:

- The Cathedral Church of San Ambrosio de Linares. This is one of the finest religious buildings built in Chile in the 20th century. It was conceived after the Basilica of Saint Ambrose, in Milan, a noble building in the Romanesque style. The Cathedral of Linares was built after the old cathedral had been destroyed by an earthquake. Mgr. Juan Subercaseaux Errázuriz, a visionary churchman and second bishop of the Diocese of Linares, was the bright mind that conceived the new Cathedral and gave beginning to its works.
- The parish church, Corazón de María — a church declared a National Monument for its Gothic style and beauty
- The "Museo de Arte y Artesanía" (Museum of Arts and Crafts)
- Some old houses of colonial style
- A main library

Some natural attractions in the surrounding area include the piedmont of the Andes mountains, with forests of pines and other trees; lakes (the artificial Colbún lake); rivers, and good camping and hiking areas.

Other cities and towns in the province include: Colbún, Panimávida, Longaví, Parral, Retiro, San Javier, Villa Alegre and Yerbas Buenas.

== Administration ==
As a commune, Linares is a third-level administrative division of Chile administered by a municipal council, headed by an alcalde who is directly elected every four years. The 2021-2025 alcalde is Mario Meza.

Within the electoral divisions of Chile, Linares is represented in the Chamber of Deputies by Jorge Tarud (PPD) and Romilio Gutiérrez (UDI) as part of the 39th electoral district, together with Colbún, San Javier, Villa Alegre and Yerbas Buenas. The commune is represented in the Senate by Hernán Larraín (UDI) and Ximena Rincón González (PDC) as part of the 11th senatorial constituency (Maule-South).

== Corruption under investigation ==
In August 2021 the Brigade against Economic Crime PDI in investigating embezzlement and fraud.

In August 2021 the Comptroller General of the Republic indicated disproportional costs for over CLP$73million, currently under investigation for chlorine and rapid antigen test during the Covid pandemic.

== Economy ==
Linares is an important agricultural, industrial and financial center of the region.

== Notable natives and residents of Linares (city and province) ==
- Juan Ignacio Molina (Abate Molina), a Chilean priest and naturalist, born in Guaraculén, a farm located in Villa Alegre comuna.
- Carlos Ibáñez del Campo, Army General and twice the president of Chile;
- Arturo Alessandri Palma, politician, statesman and twice the president of Chile
- Valentin Letelier, educator, writer and politician
- Pedro Dartnell, General, Army commander-in-chief and politician
- Manuel Miquel Rodríguez, politician
- José Manuel Sánchez, cofounder of Poliglota

=== Artists and intellectuals ===
- Pablo Neruda, poet and Nobel Prize winner, born in Parral, Linares Province
- Margot Loyola Palacios, folk musician and researcher
- Edilberto Domarchi Villagra, poet
- Samuel Maldonado Silva, poet, novelist and Journalist
- Pedro Olmos, painter
- Manuel Francisco Mesa Seco, poet and writer
- Eduardo Anguita, writer
- Rubén Campos Aragón, poet
- Max Jara, poet
- Jerónimo Lagos Lisboa, poet
- Gustavo González Rodríguez, journalist and university professor
- Juan Enrique Coeymans Avaria, civil engineer, PhD and university professor.
- Manuel Astica Fuentes, writer
- Faruk Jose Nome Aguilera - professor of organic chemistry, Universidade Federal de Santa Catarina, Brasil.
- Humberto Pinochet, painter now living in Canada
- Juan Cristobal Pinochet, painter now living in Canada

=== Sports ===
- Ismael Fuentes, footballer
- Juan Luis Mora, footballer
- Sebastián Silva (basketball)
