= Huerta del Maule =

Hamlet in Linares Province, Chile

Coordinates: 35°40′S 71°57′W

Huerta del Maule or Huerta de Maule is a Chilean hamlet (caserío) in San Javier, Linares Province, Maule Region. This picturesque and bucolic place, with a current permanent population of less than 300, used to have far more importance and population two centuries ago, having been a strategic place because of its location at the south of the Maule river and west of the Loncomilla River in central Chile, over the busy, old colonial route from Santiago - Talca to Concepción.

== History ==
Huerta del Maule was officially founded with the name of "San Antonio de la Florida" in 1754. Although a settlement already existed there since the second half of the 17th century, originally associated to the presence of a Franciscan Monastery, and according to tradition, was further encouraged by the discovery of gold in its environs. Typically, the inhabitants of Chile's Maule Region in colonial times were strongly rooted to their haciendas and, for a long time, there was strong resistance by the population to leave the rural areas and small villages and move to the cities. As in other villages of the region, in Huerta de Maule, the productive agricultural and commercial activities kept the place alive and relatively wealthy.

== Traditions ==
In Huerta de Maule, October 4 marks the traditional celebration of St. Francis of Assisi, a popular religious festival presided by the local bishop, that brings to the village thousands of pilgrims and tourists every year.

== Geography ==
Huerta del Maule lies in the foothills of a low-altitude chain of the "Cordillera de la Costa" in Central Chile, west of the Loncomilla river and the Gupo hill, and southwest of the town of San Javier, Chile. Altitude: 496 m.

== Demography ==
According to the 1992 census, Huerta del Maule had a population of 308, which had fallen to less than 270, in 2002. The area surrounding Huerta de Maule is sparsely populated. Within a radio of seven miles from the place there live a mere 2,000 people.

== Climate ==
The climate of the zone is temperate, with an average temperature of 14.4 °C (or 57.92 °F) and an average annual precipitation of 680 mm concentrated between the months of June and August.

== Sources ==
- http://www.oresteplath.cl/antologia/animita3.html
- http://www.obispadodelinares.cl/parroquias_sanjavier.php
