= Abránquil =

Village in Linares Province, Chile

Coordinates: 35°44′50.96″S 71°33′00.02″W

Abránquil is a Chilean village located in current Linares Province, near Yerbas Buenas. It is located in the riverside of the creek also named Abránquil.

The old parish of Santa Cruz de Abránquil was formerly located here, but it was moved to Yerbas Buenas.

Its name comes from Mapudungun av and ránquyl, meaning extremity, end of the reed.
