= Rari (village) =

Coordinates: 35°46′S 71°25′W

Rari (in mapudungun, a type of bush or shrub) is a village in the Chilean municipality (comuna) of Colbún, Linares Province, Maule Region located in the Andean foothills of this province.

Rari is close to the well-known hot springs of Panimávida and Quinamávida and lies 20 km to the northeast of Linares, the provincial capital. Unique handmade arts and crafts are among the important activities in the area. These crafts are made of "crin" (horse hair) by a group of skilled artisans - overwhelmingly female - specialized in this trade. Some of them have been working on it for more than seventy years.

Together, Rari and the surrounding villages (Paso Rari, San Francisco de Rari), have a population of about 1,300. The geographic coordinates of the place are: latitude: 35° 46' 0S, longitude: 71° 25' 0W, altitude: 246 mt.

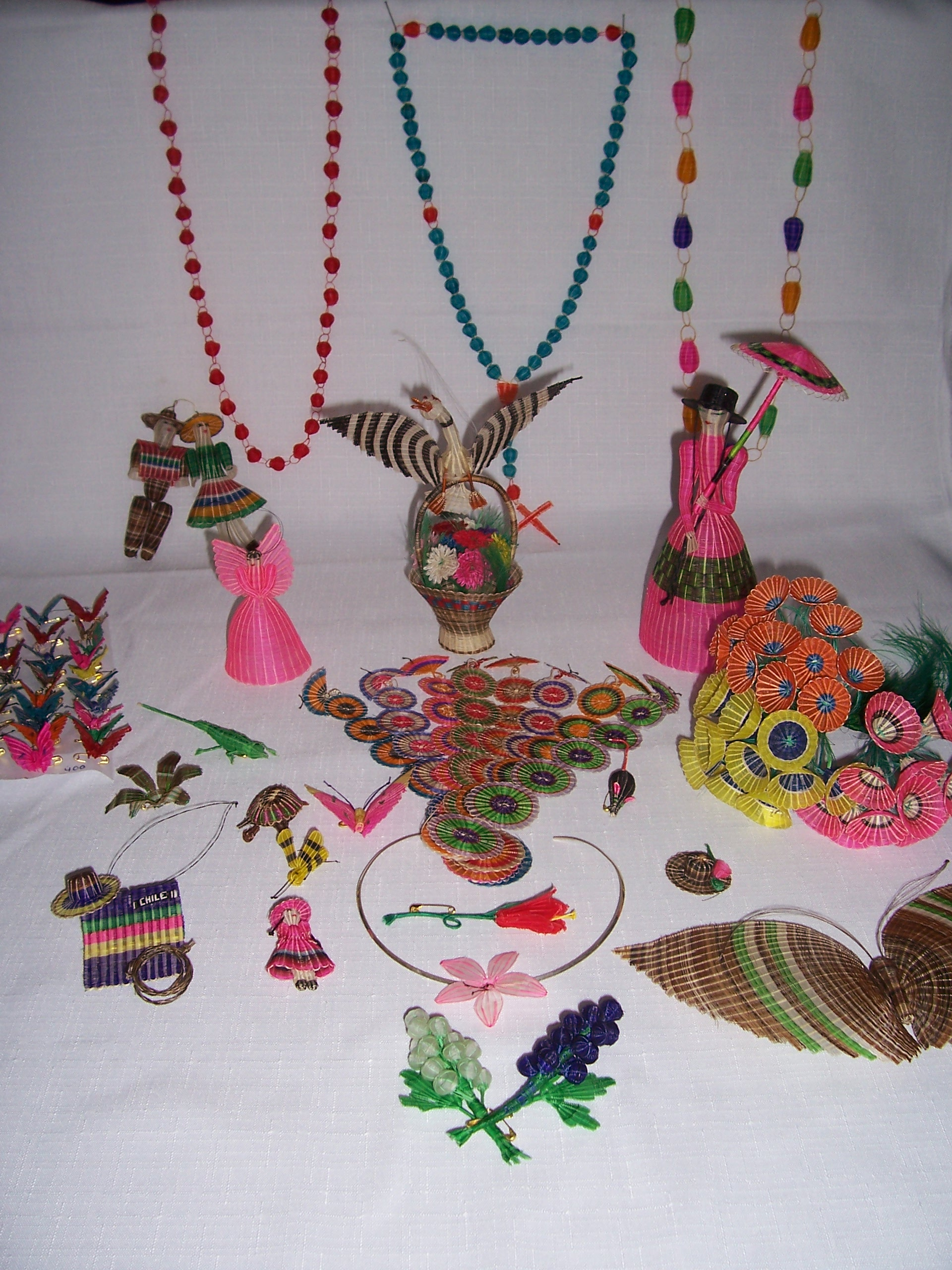
Crafts made of "crin" (horse's hair), Rari, Chile

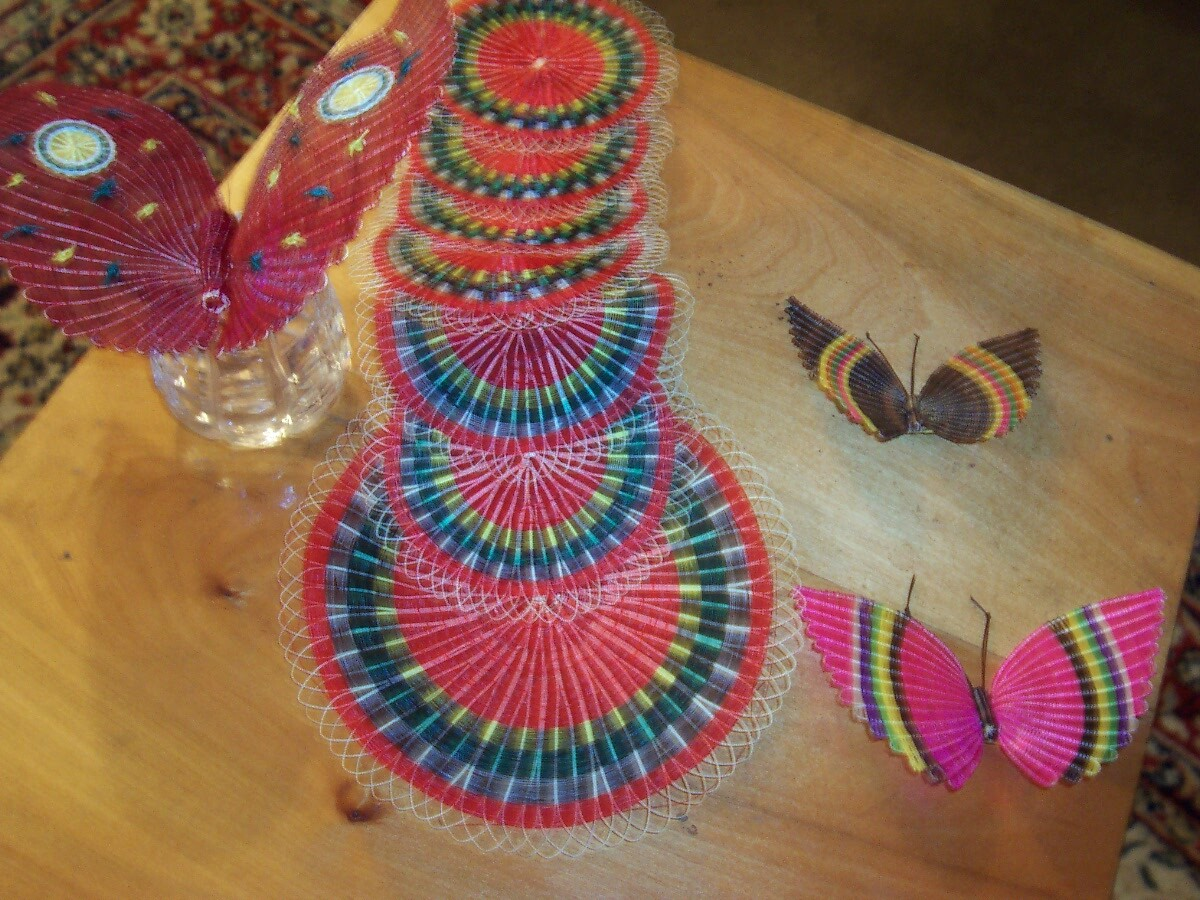
Crafts made of "crin" (horse's hair), Rari, Chile
