= Longaví (disambiguation) =

The name Longaví may refer to:

- Longaví River in Chile
- Nevado de Longaví The Longaví Andean peak, in Linares Province, Chile
- Longaví, Chile municipality and town, in Linares Province, Chile
