= Nirivilo =

Coordinates: 35°33′S 72°05′W

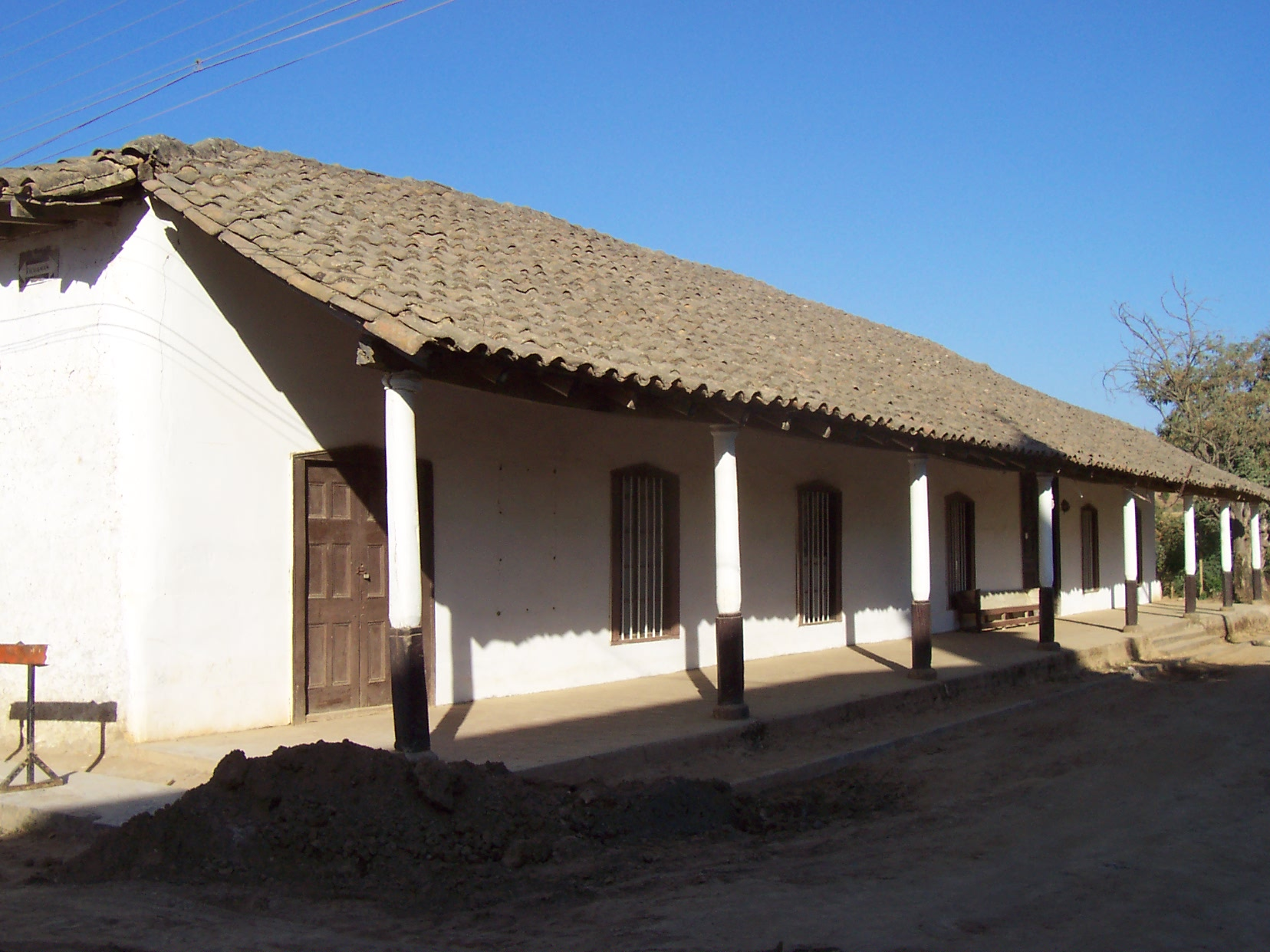
A typical, well-preserved, colonial-style rural house in the village of Nirivilo, Chile

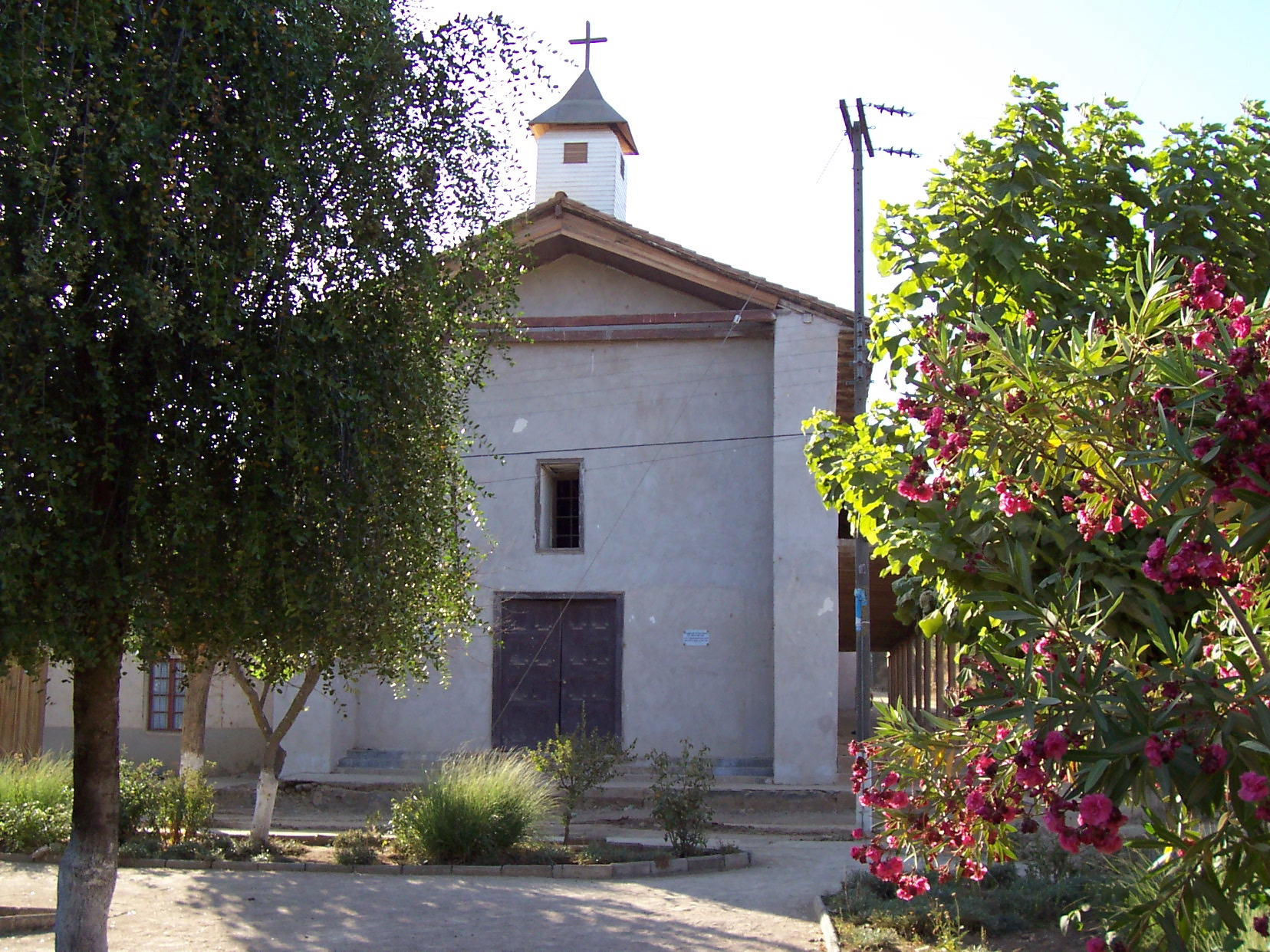
Parish church of the village of Nirivilo, Chile. The building dates from Chile's colonial period. The parish belongs to the Linares Diocese

Nirivilo (in Mapudungun: fox snake, a creature in the Mapuche mythology of Chile) is a hamlet (caserío) in San Javier commune, in the Chilean province of Linares, Maule Region. It offers some remarkable examples of typical Chilean rural architecture. Its parish church dates from the end of the 18th century and is a National Monument.
