= San Javier, Chile =

San Javier
- City and Commune
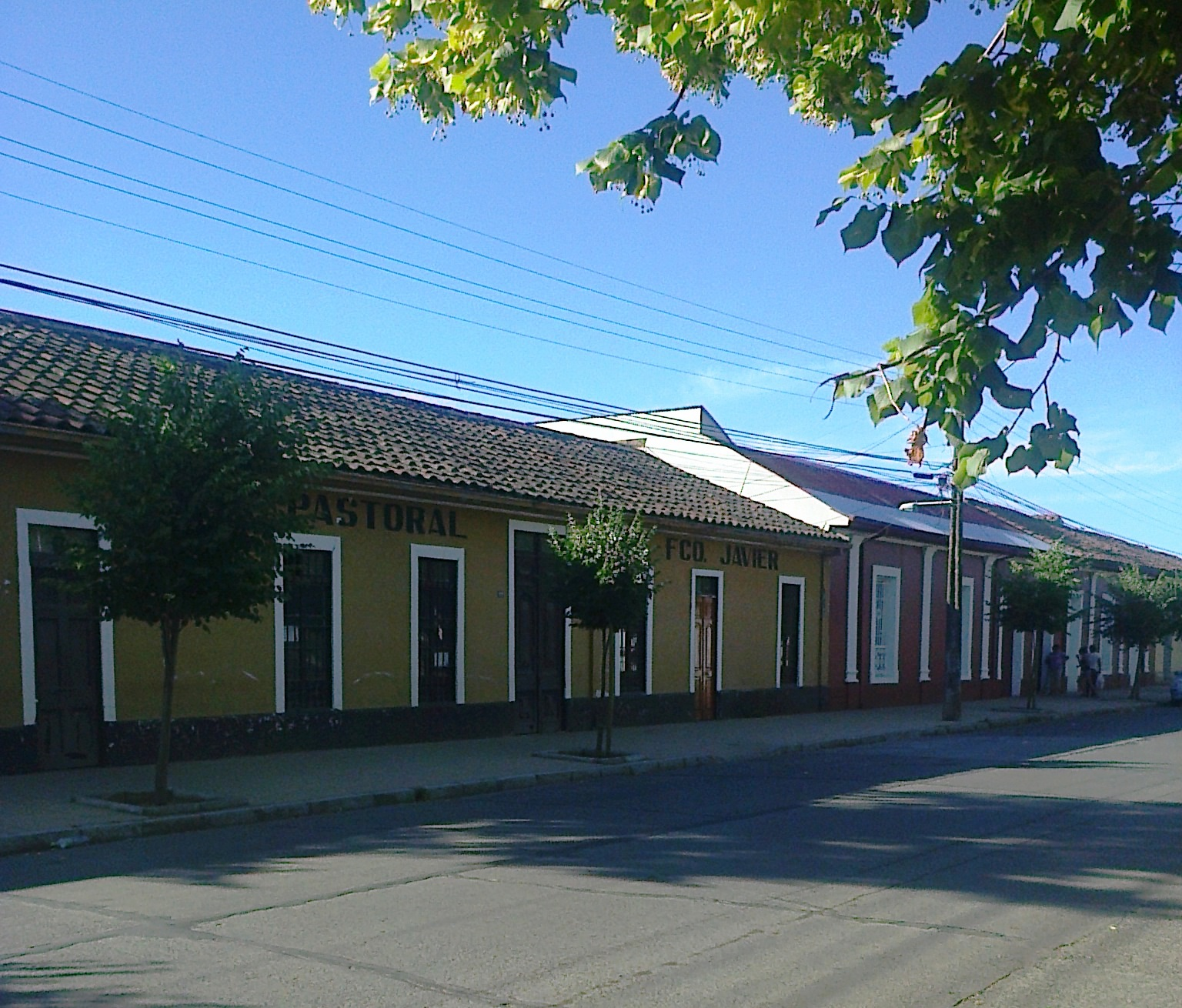
- Houses in San Javier

- Coat of arms Location of the San Javier commune in the Maule Region Location in Chile
- Coordinates (city): 36°36′S 71°45′W
- Country: Chile
- Region: Maule
- Province: Linares
- Founded: November 18, 1852
- Founded as: San Javier de Loncomilla

Government
  - Type: Municipality
  - Alcalde: Jorge Silva Sepúlveda (PDC)

Area
  - Total: 1,313.4 km^{2} (507.1 sq mi)
- Elevation: 83 m (272 ft)

Population (2012 Census)
  - Total: 40,189
  - Density: 30.599/km^{2} (79.252/sq mi)
  - Urban: 22,004
  - Rural: 15,789
- Demonym(s): sanjavierino, sanjavierina

Sex
  - Men: 18,827
  - Women: 18,966
- Time zone: UTC-4 (CLT)
  - Summer (DST): UTC-3 (CLST)
- Postal code: 3660000
- Area code: 56 + 73
- Website: www.imsanjavier.cl (in Spanish)

San Javier (Spanish pronunciation: [saŋ xaˈβjeɾ]) is a Chilean city and commune located in the Province of Linares, Maule Region. The city lies in the geographical center of the country, some 270 km (168 mi) south of Santiago, 31 km (19 mi) to the northwest of the provincial capital, Linares, and 24 km (15 mi) to the south of Talca, the regional capital. The Pan-American Highway ("Ruta 5 Sur") passes through the commune of San Javier, touching tangentially the eastern side of the town. A paved road connects San Javier with Colbún, Colbún dam lake and Panimávida and Quinamávida hot springs.

== Demography ==
According to 2005 estimates, the commune of San Javier has a population of 39,583, of which 19,682 are male and 19,901 are female. About 60% of the population is urban and 40% is rural. According to the 2002 census of the National Statistics Institute, the population of the commune of San Javier was 37,793 inhabitants (18,827 men and 18,966 women). Of these, 22,004 (58.2%) lived in urban areas and 15,789 (41.8%) in rural areas. Between the 1992 and 2002 censuses, the population grew by 6.2% (2,206 persons).

== Geography ==
The commune covers an area of 1,313.4 km^{2} (507 sq mi). The eastern (and smaller) part of its territory lies within the fertile, central plain or "depresión intermedia", (Chilean Central Valley) but the extense western part is hilly and somewhat drier, a typical "Cordillera de la Costa" terrain, which requires supplemental irrigation to support its varied cultivations. This area lends itself nicely to wine growing and cereal cultivation. Therefore, San Javier has some of the better vineyards and quality wines of the bountiful Maule Valley, in the Chile's central valley viticultural regions or appellations.

San Javier is bordered on the west by the communes of Constitución and Empedrado, (both in Talca province), Cauquenes, (in Cauquenes Province), and Villa Alegre; on the north by Pencahue and Maule communes, in Talca province; on the east, by Yerbas Buenas, Villa Alegre, Linares and Longaví and on the south, by Cauquenes and Retiro. The town lies on the right margin of the River Loncomilla. Located a few km north of San Javier is the wide Maule river, of which the Loncomilla is the main tributary. River Purapel, a regional "anomaly", since it flows eastward in a country where the overwhelming majority of rivers flow in the opposite direction, is a tributary of the Loncomilla.

=== Geographic coordinates ===
- Elevation: 83 m (272 ft)
- Latitude: 35° 36' 0S
- Longitude: 71° 42' 0W

== Heritage ==
=== Architecture ===
There are many villages and other smaller, rural entities within the communal territory; several of them are quite distant from the main urban centers and relatively isolated from the more distorting external cultural influences. Therefore, the commune can boast several villages with well-preserved colonial rural architecture - the criollo legacy - both in the religious as well as the civil domains. Singular examples of this brand of picturesque and bucolic villages, in the commune, are: Huerta de Maule, Nirivilo, Bobadilla, Caliboro and Melozal. Also, along the paved road that connects the towns of San Javier and Villa Alegre there are some outstanding examples of traditional Chilean rural architecture, which is especially noticeable in the farm houses (casas de fundo) typical of the region.

Some of the parish churches in this zone are among the oldest in the Linares diocese and the Maule Region.

=== Poets ===
The Maule Region has produced a number of writers and poets. San Javier has been the birthplace of two poets: Raimundo Echeverría y Larrazábal (1897–1924) and Jerónimo Lagos Lisboa (1883–1958).

== Administration ==
As a commune, San Javier is a third-level administrative division of Chile administered by a municipal council, headed by an alcalde who is directly elected every four years. The 2008-2012 alcalde is Pedro Fernández Chavarrí (PDC), and the councillors are as follows:

- José Zapata Mora: UDI
- Maria Yolanda Lopez Balduzzi: RN
- Jorge Ignacio Silva Sepúlveda: PDC
- Gabriel Rodriguez Bustos: PPD
- Ronaldo Abraham Flores: PPD
- Cristobal Cancino Albornoz: UDI

Within the electoral divisions of Chile, San Javier is represented in the Chamber of Deputies by Jorge Tarud (PDC) and Romilio Gutiérrez (UDI) as part of the 39th electoral district, together with Linares, Colbún, Villa Alegre, Yerbas Buenas. The commune is represented in the Senate by Hernán Larraín (UDI) and Manuel Antonio Matta (PDC) as part of the 11th senatorial constituency (Maule-South).
