= Longaví River =

River in Chile

Coordinates: 36.05479°S 71.70570°W

Longaví River

The Longaví River is a tributary of the Maule River, in the Province of Linares, Maule Region of Chile. The Longaví is 120 km long.

The Longaví (in mapudungun: "snake's head") rises in an Andean chain of north–south orientation at about 2,000 m of average altitude, but its main tributary, the Blanco river, drains the south-east slope of the 3,230 m snow-covered Nevado de Longaví (an extinct volcano), one of the landmarks of Linares province. The Bullileo and Digua dams are located in the upper watershed of Longaví river. From then, the river flows generally northwestwardly, passing near the town of Longaví until it meets the Perquilauquén river to form the Loncomilla River.
