= San Javier Airport (disambiguation) =

San Javier Airport may refer to:

- Murcia–San Javier Airport in San Javier, Spain
- San Javier Airport (Bolivia) near San Javier, Santa Cruz, Bolivia
- San Javier Las Mercedes Airport near San Javier, Maule, Chile
- San Javier Airport (Chile) near San Javier, Maule, Chile
- San Javier Santa María de Migre Airport near San Javier, Maule, Chile
