= Manuel Miquel =

Manuel Miquel may refer to:

- Manuel Miquel Rodríguez (1812-1879), Chilean politician
- Manu Miquel (born 1994), Spanish footballer
