= Rari =

Rari may refer to:

- Rari (village), a village in Chile
- Ferrari (slang term)
