= Abránquil Creek =

Creek

Location
- Country: Chile
- Region: Maule Region

Abránquil is a creek originating at the northeast of Yerbas Buenas. It is short-flowed.
