= St. Ambrose Cathedral, Linares =

Coordinates: 35.8456°S 71.5993°W

St. Ambrose Cathedral
- Catedral de San Ambrosio
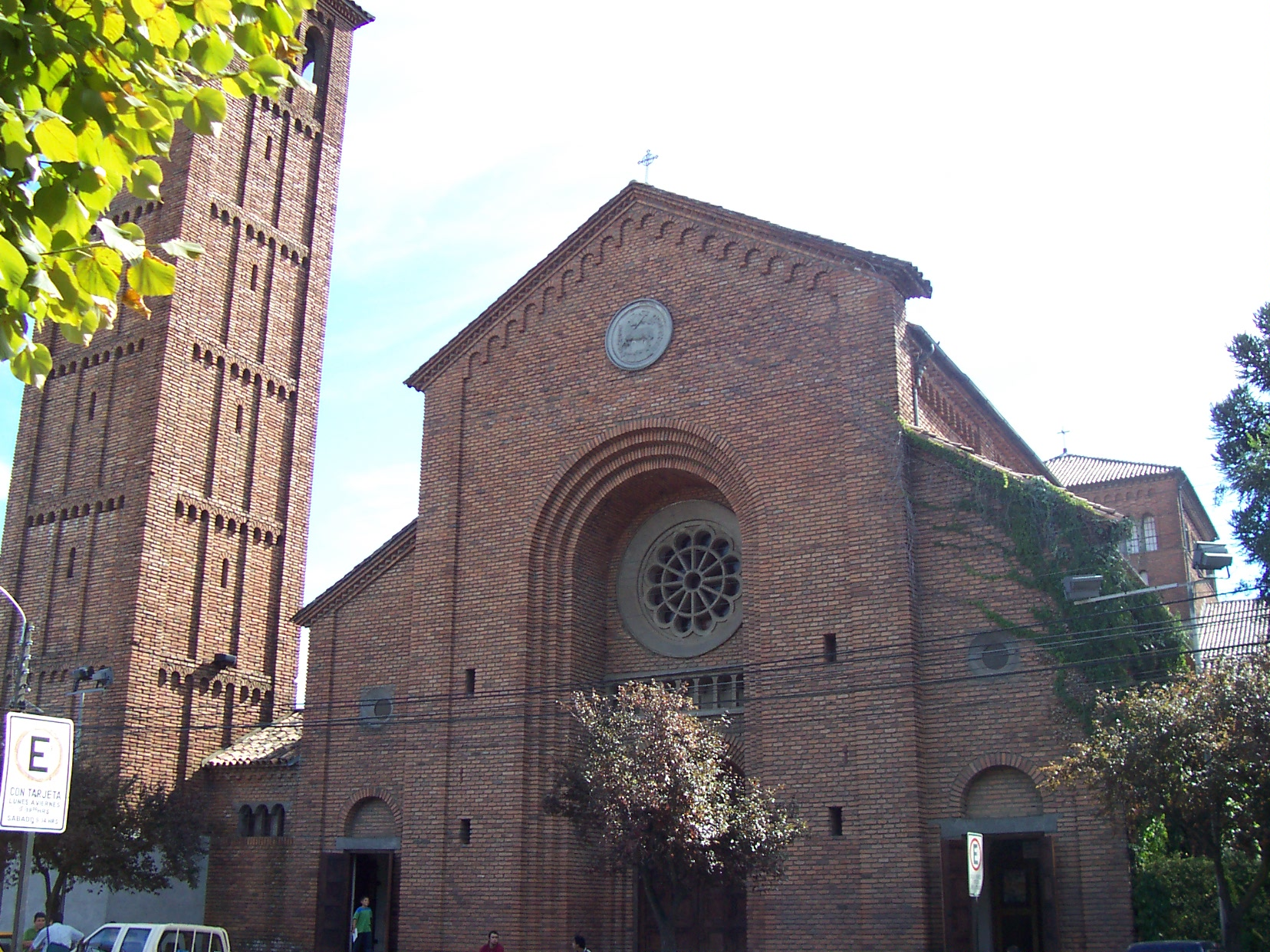
- St. Ambrose Cathedral
- Location: Linares
- Country: Chile
- Denomination: Roman Catholic Church

The St. Ambrose Cathedral (Spanish: Catedral de San Ambrosio) Also Linares Cathedral Is a cathedral church of Catholic worship, home of the Diocese of Linares in the Maule Region in Chile. It was built between 1935 and 1937.

After the founding of Linares, on May 23, 1794, the priest of Yerbas Buenas Pablo de la Barra transferred to this city the seat of his parish, which was built between 1796 and 1810, by Tiburcio Gúmera. The church suffered damage from the 1906 Valparaíso earthquake and the 1928 Talca earthquake, which led to its demolition. A fundraising campaign was started to build a new church, a task entrusted to the first bishop of the diocese Miguel León Prado, a task that after his death was continued by Bishop Juan Subercaseaux. It would bring together the architects Carlos Bresciani and Jorge del Campo Rivera, in addition to his brother, Pedro Subercaseaux. The church is based on the design of Basilica of Sant'Ambrogio in Milan, which was the idea of Pedro Subercaseaux. It was inaugurated in 1937.

== See also ==
- Roman Catholicism in Chile
- St. Ambrose
