= Ayüwün =

Urban wetland in Linares, Chile

Coordinates: 35.836197911629334°S 71.5772787495608246°W

Linares Urban Wetland (Spanish: Humedal Urbano de Linares), also known as Ayüwün, is an urban wetland located in the city of Linares, Chile. Using the Urban Wetlands Law the Ministry of the Environment has declared 1.1 hectares of it a protected area. The borders of the protected area were as of April 2023 in a process of revision for an eventual expansion.
