= Carlos Camus =

Chilean Catholic bishop

His Excellency, the Most Reverend Carlos Camus
- Bishop of Linares
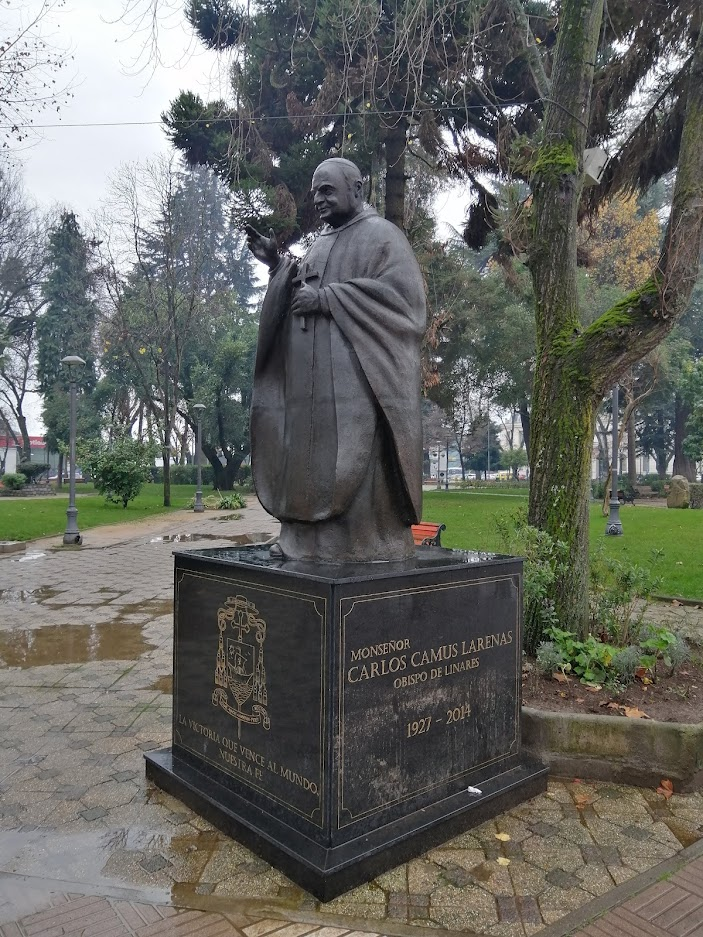
- Monument to Monseñor Carlos Camus
- Diocese: Linares
- Appointed: 11 December 1976
- In office: 17 January 2003
- Predecessor: Augusto Osvaldo Salinas Fuenzalida
- Successor: Tomislav Koljatic Maroevic
- Other post: Bishop of Copiapó

Orders
- Ordination: 21 September 1957

Personal details
- Born: 14 January 1927 Valparaíso, Chile
- Died: 16 March 2014 (aged 87) Santiago, Chile
- Education: Seminario de Santiago; Pontifical Catholic University of Valparaíso (BA); Pontifical Catholic University of Chile
- Motto: "La victoria que vence al mundo es nuestra Fe"

Bishop Carlos Marcio Camus Larenas (14 January 1927 – 16 March 2014) emeritus (retired) bishop of the Linares, Chile and human rights advocate. He was a proponent of excommunication for those guilty of torture.

Born in Valparaíso, on 14 January 1927, he was ordained a priest on 21 September 1957. Camus was then appointed Bishop of Copiapó, Chile on 31 January 1968 and was ordained bishop on 3 March 1968. He was then appointed Bishop of Linares, Chile on 11 December 1976 and installed on 17 April 1977. He retired on 17 January 2003. He died on 16 March 2014.
