= Perquilauquén River =

River in Chile

Maule cuenca

The Perquilauquén River (mapudungun: for "purgative") is a tributary of the Loncomilla river, in the Maule Region of Chile. The river joins the Longaví to form the Loncomilla, a tributary of the Maule river.

== Geography ==
The Perquilauquén flows initially from southeast to northwest and forms the border between the provinces of Linares, Itata and Punilla. Subsequently, it changes its course flowing north, then east and then north, again, until it is joined by the Longaví.
