= San Javier Airport (Chile) =

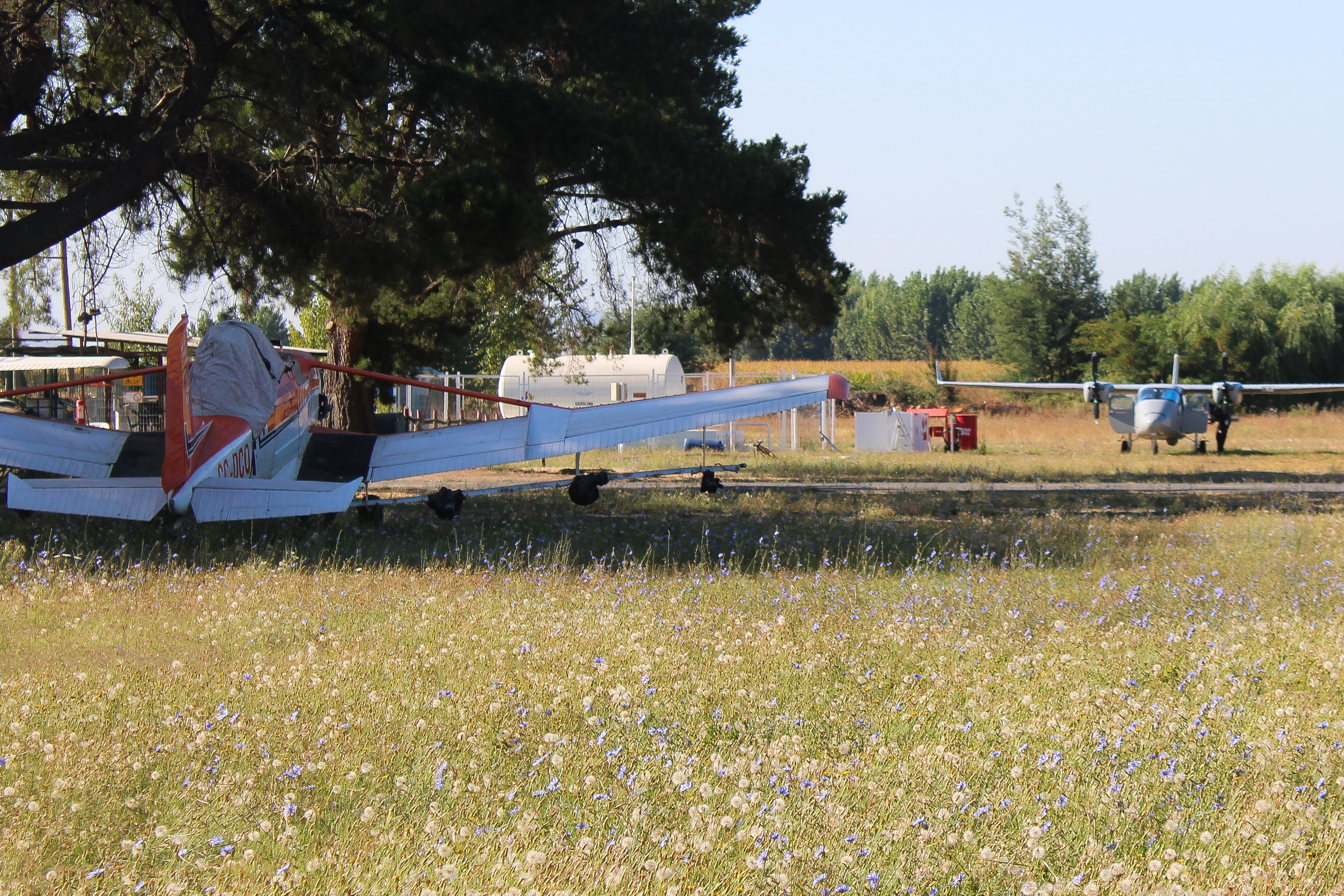
- IATA: none; ICAO: SCSJ

Summary
- Airport type: Private
- Serves: San Javier, Chile
- Elevation AMSL: 361 ft / 110 m
- Coordinates: 35°37′35″S 71°42′00″W

Map
- Location of San Javier Airport in Chile

Runways
Direction	Length		Surface
Direction	m	ft	Surface
17/35	590	1,936	Asphalt
- Sources: GCM Google Maps

San Javier Airport (Spanish: Aeropuerto de San Javier), (ICAO: SCSJ) is an airport serving San Javier, a town in the Maule Region of Chile. The airport is 3 kilometres (1.9 mi) south of the town alongside the Pan-American Highway.

Runway 17 has a 115 metres (377 ft) displaced threshold, and approximately 180 metres (590 ft) of unpaved overrun.

== See also ==
- Transport in Chile
- List of airports in Chile
