= Iglesia del Corazón de María (Linares) =

Catholic Church

Coordinates: 35.8470°S 71.6019°W

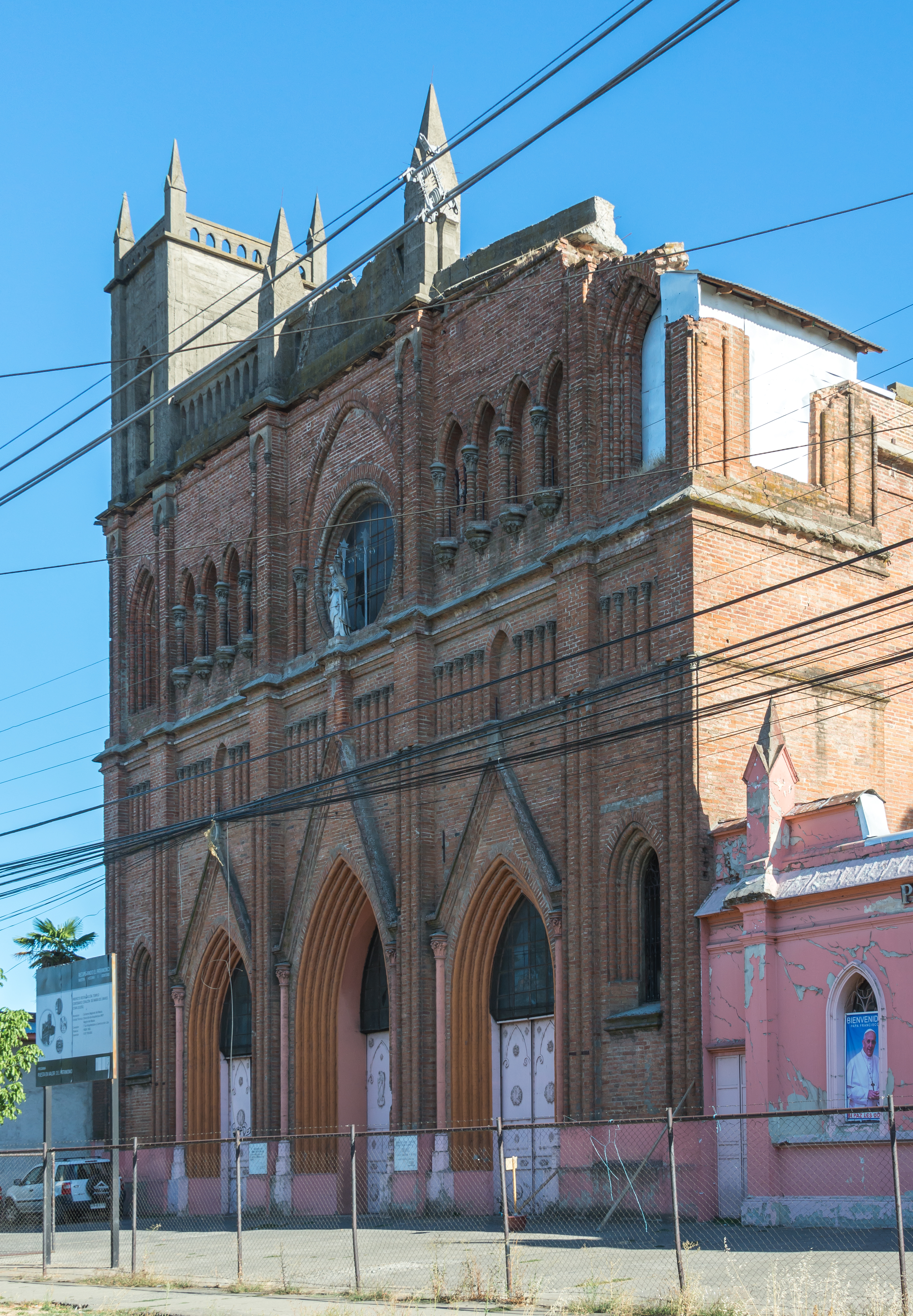

Religion
- Affiliation: Roman Catholic

Location
- Municipality: Linares
- Country: Chile
- Interactive map of Iglesia del Corazón de María

The Iglesia del Corazón de María is a Catholic church located in the city of Linares, Maule Region, Chile. Inaugurated in 1905, it was declared a National Monument of Chile in 1995, within the category of Historic Monuments.

== History ==
During the very late 19th century, the church was commissioned by the Claretians to be built on land donated by Dolores Ferrada. It was inaugurated on December 9, 1905. As a result of the 1939 Chillán earthquake, the church lost some of its facade elements.

The church was run by the Claretians until 2008. It was heavily damaged by the 2010 Chile earthquake.

== Description ==
Built in a combination of the Neo-Romanesque and the Neo-Gothic styles, the church features three naves, a central and two side ones, with altars at the end of each, which are made of marble, jasper and onyx. It is constructed of brick and reinforced concrete, and the main facade featured square towers at the corners.
