= Juan Luis Mora (footballer, born 1979) =

Chilean footballer

Personal information
- Full name: Juan Luis Mora Parada
- Date of birth: 17 September 1979 (age 47)
- Place of birth: Linares, Chile
- Height: 1.81 m (5 ft 11 in)
- Position: Goalkeeper

Senior career*
Years	Team	Apps	(Gls)
1997–2001	Linares Unido		
2002–2005	Rangers		
2006–2007	U. de Concepción		
2007	Deportes Temuco		
2008	Fernández Vial		
2009–2013	Rangers		
- * Club domestic league appearances and goals as of 18 March 2020

Juan Luis Mora (born 17 September 1979) is a former Chilean footballer.

He last played for Rangers de Talca.
