= Jerónimo Lagos Lisboa =

Chilean poet

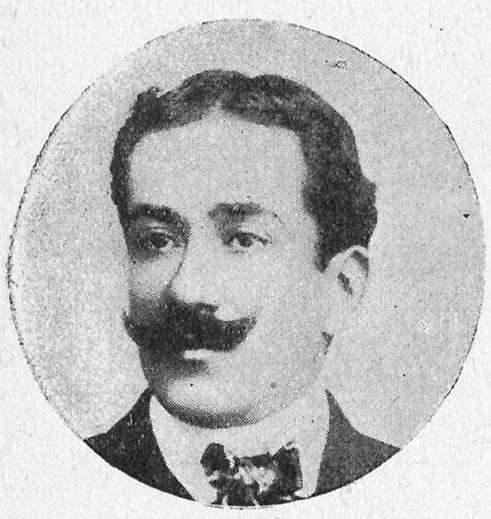
Jerónimo Lagos (before 1912)

Jerónimo Lagos Lisboa (1883–1958) was a Chilean poet.

He was born in San Javier de Loncomilla, Linares Province, Maule Region, Chile, in 1883. He studied in Talca and Valparaiso. He was a president of the Chilean Writers Society. He was awarded several poetry prizes, among them the Municipality of Santiago Poetry Award for his works "Tiempo Ausente" (1937) and "La pequeña Lumbre" (1945). He died in 1958. His home in San Javier, Chile is now owned by the city and is open to the public.
