= Putagán—Colbún railway =

Service
- Operator(s): EFE

History
- Opened: 1914
- Closed: 1956

Technical
- Line length: 33 km (21 mi)
- Track gauge: 600 mm (1 ft 11 5/8 in)

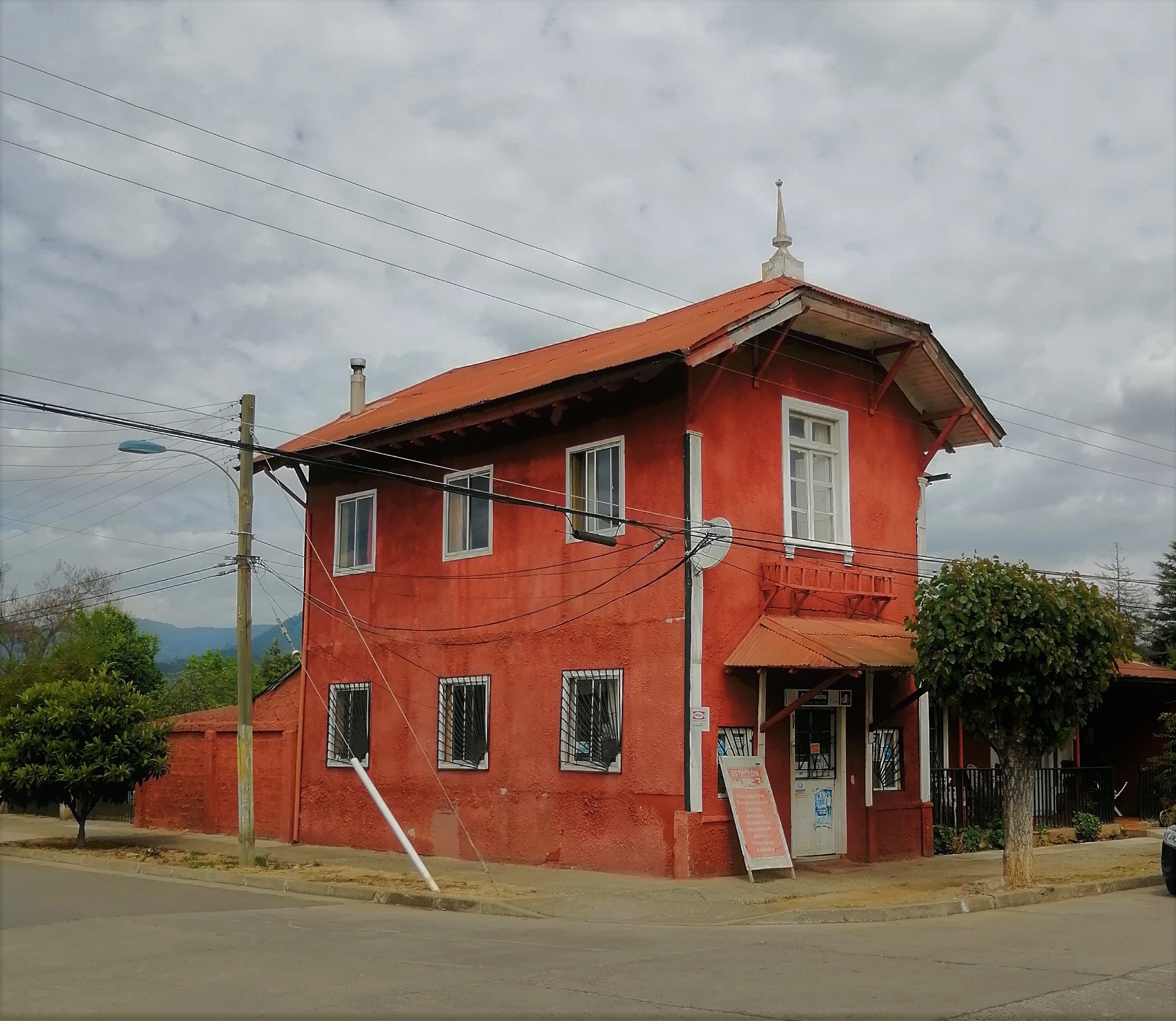
The former Panimávida train station

The Putagán—Colbún railway, locally known as the Tren Chico (Small Train), was a 33 kilometres (21 mi) long 600 mm (1 ft 11 5/8 in) narrow gauge railway that operated between the communities of Yerba Buenas and Colbún in the province of Linares in Chile. It was in existence between 1914 and 1956. Parts of the former trackbed were converted to roads, the L215 and L11.

== History ==
Since the early twentieth century plans were made to build a railroad that would connect local communities in the province of Linares with the national rail network, especially the village of Panimávida with its famous hot springs. Construction finally started in 1910 and was finished in 1913. Operations started the following year.

On October 9, 1953, a serious accident occurred near Yerba Buena when a rural bus crashed into a train, leaving 22 people dead and many injured in one of Chile's worst train disasters ever.

Due to this tragedy and road improvements between Panimávida and Yerba Buenas, with competition of minibuses and taxis as a result, operations finally ceased in 1956.
