= Quinamávida, Chile =

Village in Chile

Coordinates: 35°47′S 71°26′W

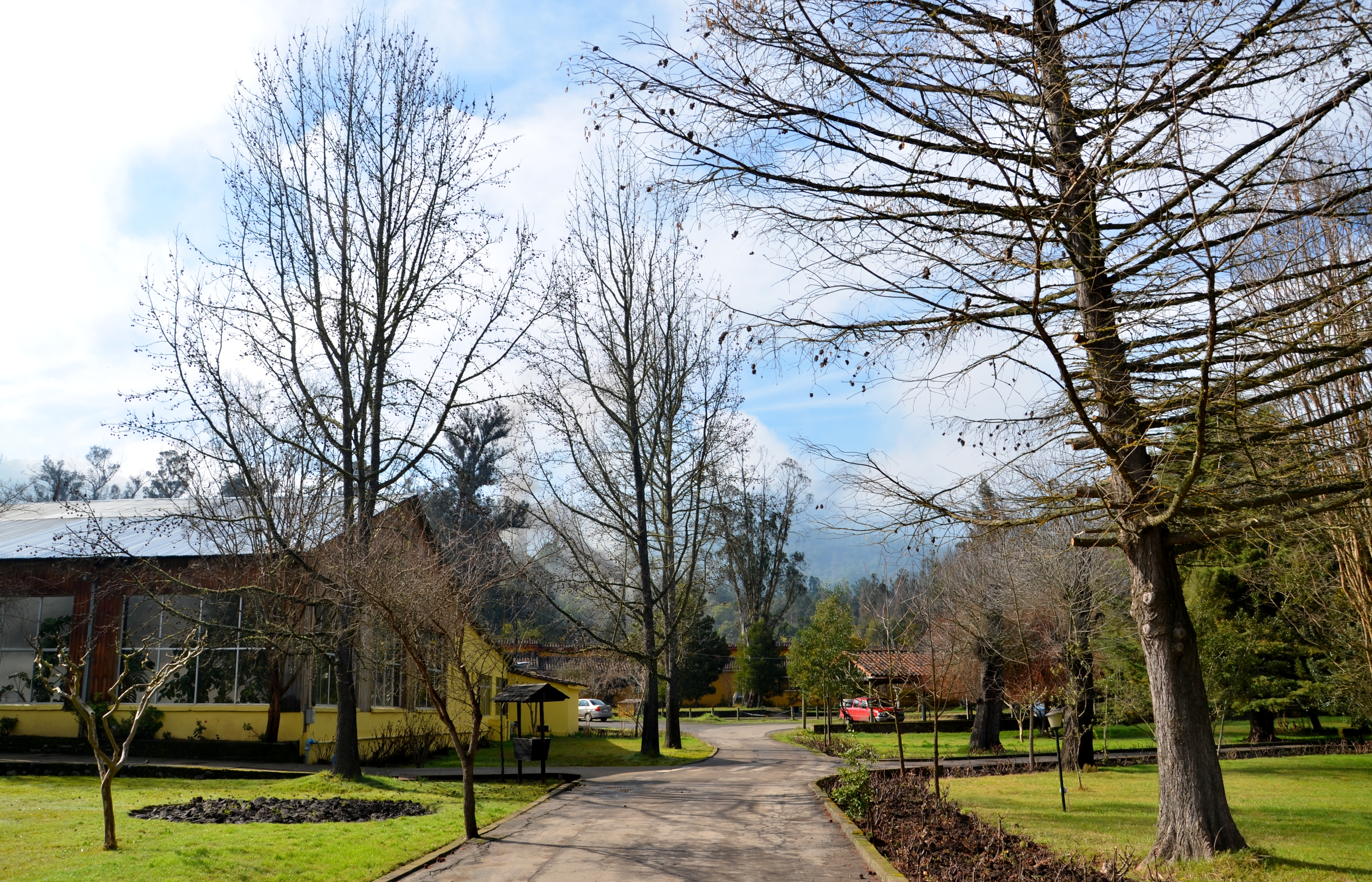
Quinamávida.

Quinamávida (Mapudungun: "five hills") is a Chilean village in the commune of Colbún, Linares Province, Maule Region. Quinamávida is well known in Chile as a popular hot springs and resort spa.
