= Manuel Miquel Rodríguez =

Chilean politician

Manuel Miquel Rodríguez (1812, Linares – 1879) was a Chilean politician.
