= Max Jara =

Chilean poet (1886–1965)

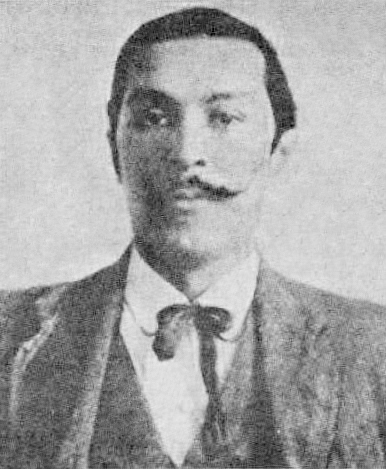
Max Jara

Maximiliano Jara Troncoso (August 21, 1886 in Yerbas Buenas – July 6, 1965 in Santiago), better known as Max Jara, was a Chilean poet. He won the Chilean National Prize for Literature in 1956.

He studied medicine at the University of Chile. He worked as a secretary at the university, where he became an administrative deputy manager. He also worked at the newspapers El Mercurio and El Diario Ilustrado in Santiago.
