= Edilberto Domarchi =

Chilean poet

Edilberto Domarchi Villagra (24 February 1924 – 9 May 2000) was a Chilean poet, writer and professor from Linares.

== Biography ==
Edilberto Domarchi was born in the Chilean city of Linares. and was the eldest in a family of nine siblings. He studied at School No. 3 and the Lyceum of that city, and later at the José Abelardo Núñez Normal School in Santiago, teaching for almost his entire life at the Men's Lyceum of Chillán.

== Activities ==
He was president and organizer of two of the most important national poetry meetings held in Chile, which took place in the city of Chillán in 1970 and 1975. As the president of the Society of Writers of Ñuble, an institution that he helped to found, he won the "Andrés Bello" National Poetry Prize, and was invited to Venezuela by writers from that country. On this journey, he also visited Colombia, Ecuador and Peru.

His poetry earned him at least a dozen awards at the communal, provincial and national levels, including the Municipal Prize for Art and Culture of Chillán, obtained in 1971; the Municipal Prize for Art of Linares in 1992, the Andrés Bello Prize and the Diploma of Honor in Poetry from Fital de Talca in 1971. His work appears in no less than fifteen poetry anthologies.
