= Colbún =

- Town and Commune
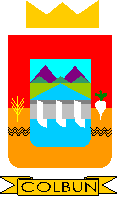
- Coat of arms Map of the Colbún commune in the Maule Region Location in Chile
- Coordinates (city): 35°42′S 71°25′W
- Country: Chile
- Region: Maule
- Province: Linares
- Founded: 30 December 1927

Government
  - Type: Municipality
  - Alcalde: Pedro Pablo Muñoz (Ind.)

Area
  - Total: 2,899.9 km^{2} (1,119.7 sq mi)

Population (2002 Census)
  - Total: 17,619
  - Density: 6.0757/km^{2} (15.736/sq mi)
  - Urban: 5,152
  - Rural: 12,467

Sex
  - Men: 8,943
  - Women: 8,676
- Time zone: UTC-4 (CLT)
  - Summer (DST): UTC-3 (CLST)
- Postal code: 3610000
- Area code: 56 + 73
- Website: Municipality of Colbún

Colbún (Mapudungun: "Cleaning of the land") is a Chilean town and commune in Linares Province, Maule Region. The commune has a population of over 17,000 inhabitants and covers an area of 2,900 km^{2} (1,120 sq mi), making it the province's largest. Its capital, the town of Colbún, has 3,679 inhabitants (2002 census). It is 7 km (4 mi) west of the center of continental Chile.

== Demographics ==
According to the 2002 census of the National Statistics Institute, Colbún spans an area of 2,899.9 km^{2} (1,120 sq mi) and has 17,619 inhabitants (8,943 men and 8,676 women). Of these, 5,152 (29.2%) lived in urban areas and 12,467 (70.8%) in rural areas. The population grew by 3.9% (669 persons) between the 1992 and 2002 censuses.

== Geography ==
The Colbún commune is bordered on the west by Yerbas Buenas; on the southwest by Linares and Longaví; on the north by San Clemente (Talca Province); on the east and southeast, by Argentina, and on the south, by Parral and San Fabián; the latter in Ñuble Region. The municipality of Colbún occupies the easternmost strip of the Province of Linares, which boasts some of the highest provincial peaks and the headwaters of several provincial rivers.

== Foundation and Historical facts ==
The municipality of Colbún was officially founded December 30, 1927. Prior to that date the municipality was called Panimávida and had its headquarters in that town. The municipality of Panimávida had been founded May 6, 1906.

From 1913 to 1954 Colbún was the terminus of the narrow gauge Putagán—Colbún railway originating in the city of Linares.

== Administration ==
Colbún is administered by Mayor Pedro Pablo Muñoz (Independent), who has been elected for the period 2021-2024, and the Municipal Council is composed of:

- Ángel Cárter Ramos
- Italo Sepúlveda Oses
- José Olivares Quiroz
- Renato Hernández
- Janette Molina
- Jorge Dedes Franco

Within the electoral divisions of Chile, Colbún is represented in the Chamber of Deputies by Jorge Tarud (PDC) and Romilio Gutiérrez (UDI) as part of the 39th electoral district, together with Linares, San Javier, Villa Alegre and Yerbas Buenas. The commune is represented in the Senate by Hernán Larraín (UDI) and Ximena Rincón González (PDC) as part of the 11th senatorial constituency (Maule-South).

== Attractions ==
In the vicinity of Colbún there are two well-known Chilean spas: the "Termas de Quinamávida" and the "Termas de Panimávida". In addition, the municipality concentrates the hydroelectric industry of the province, with the important power stations of Colbún and Machicura. The Colbún dam lake is a centre for recreation and water sports although these are highly dependent on water levels, which tend to be erratic.

== Local customs ==
=== Crafts ===
Near Panimávida lies the village of Rari, famous for its unique crafts made of horse hair.
