= Villa Alegre, Chile =

Villa Alegre
- City and Commune
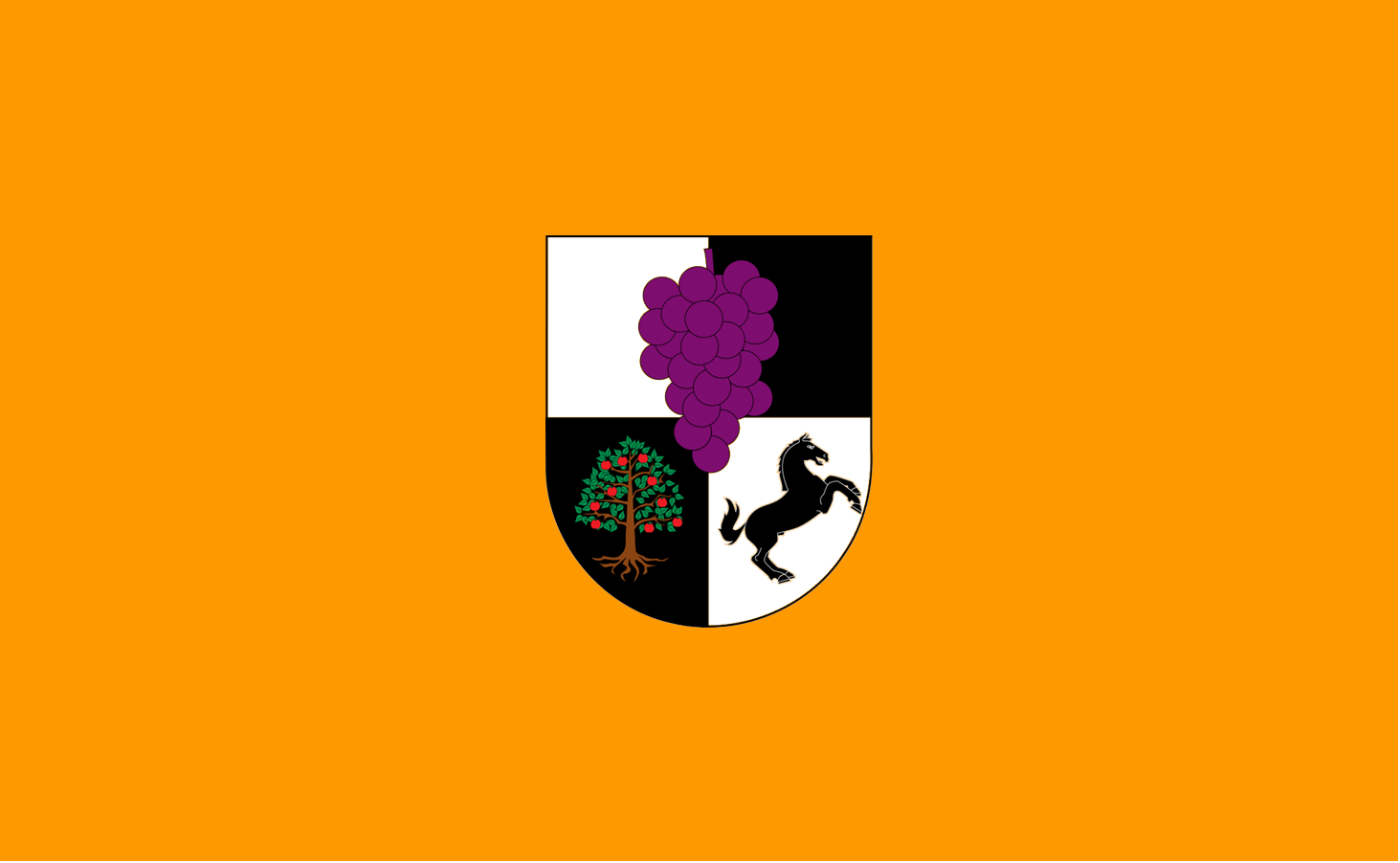
- Flag Coat of arms Location of the Villa Alegre commune in the Maule Region Location in Chile
- Coordinates (city): 35°40′29″S 71°44′38″W
- Country: Chile
- Region: Maule
- Province: Linares
- Founded: May 6, 1891

Government
  - Type: Municipality
  - Alcalde: Arturo Palma Vilches (PPD)

Area
  - Total: 189.8 km^{2} (73.3 sq mi)
- Elevation: 67 m (220 ft)

Population (2012 Census)
  - Total: 14,695
  - Density: 77.42/km^{2} (200.5/sq mi)
  - Urban: 5,456
  - Rural: 9,269
- Demonym: Villalegrino

Sex
  - Men: 7,332
  - Women: 7,393
- Time zone: UTC-4 (CLT)
  - Summer (DST): UTC-3 (CLST)
- Area code: 56 + 73
- Website: www.villalegre.cl

Villa Alegre (Spanish for "joyous town") a commune and city located in Linares Province, Maule Region of Chile. With an area of 189.8 km^{2} (73 sq mi), Villa Alegre is the smallest commune in the Maule Region. It sits 92 m (302 ft) above sea level.

== Demographics ==
According to the 2002 census of the National Statistics Institute, Villa Alegre spans an area of 189.8 km^{2} (73 sq mi) and has 14,725 inhabitants (7,332 men and 7,393 women). Of these, 5,456 (37.1%) lived in urban areas and 9,269 (62.9%) in rural areas. Between the 1992 and 2002 censuses, the population fell by 2.8% (425 persons).

== History ==
Villa Alegre was founded on May 6, 1891, and was one of the first places in Chile to have an electric tramway service, in 1915.

== Economy ==
Villa Alegre and its neighbor San Javier are traditional winemaking areas. The Loncomilla valley, which includes these two communes, is endowed with some of the better vineyards and quality wines of the bountiful Maule Valley, in the Chile's central valley viticultural regions or appellations.

== Government ==
As a commune, Villa Alegre is a third-level administrative division of Chile administered by a municipal council, headed by an alcalde who is directly elected every four years. The 2008-2012 alcalde is Arturo Palma Vilches (PPD), and the councilors are:

- María Ignacia González Torres (PDC)
- Héctor Del Tránsito Manosalva González (PRSD)
- Manuel Muñoz Bastias (PRSD)
- Justo Rebolledo Araya (PS)
- Eduardo Bustamante Maureira (RN)
- Edgardo Bravo Rebolledo (RN)

Within the electoral divisions of Chile, Villa Alegre is represented in the Chamber of Deputies by Jorge Tarud (PDC) and Romilio Gutiérrez (UDI) as part of the 39th electoral district, together with Linares, Colbún, San Javier and Yerbas Buenas. The commune is represented in the Senate by Hernán Larraín (UDI) and Ximena Rincón González (PDC) as part of the 11th senatorial constituency (Maule-South).

== Famous People born in Villa Alegre ==
- Juan Ignacio Molina, (Abate Molina): Jesuit priest, naturalist and scholar of the 18th and 19th centuries.
- Malaquías Concha Ortiz, politician and social reformer.
- Ismael Fuentes, footballer, current member of the Chile national football team
