= Panimávida =

- Town
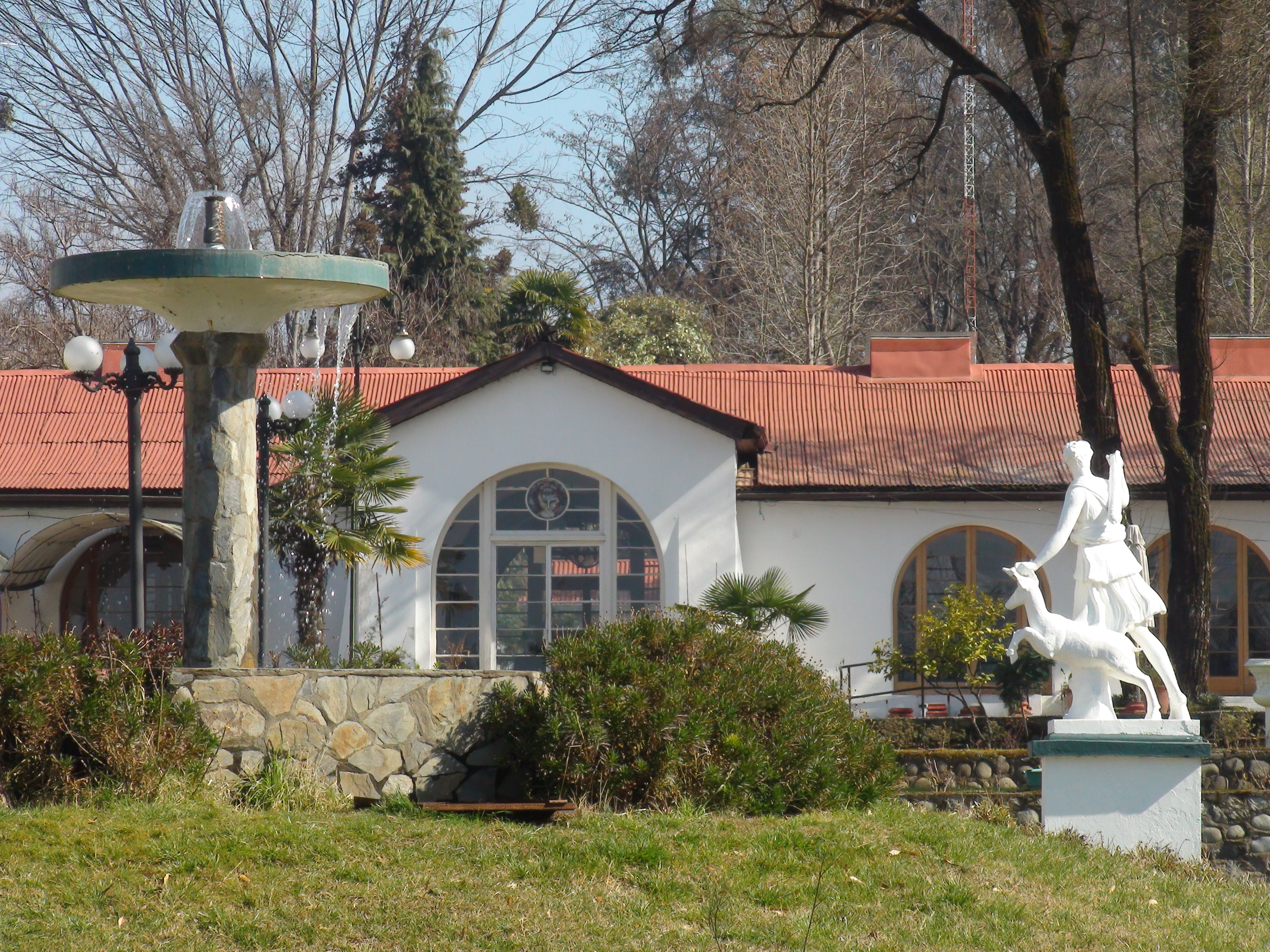

- Location in Chile
- Coordinates (town): 35°45′S 71°25′W
- Country: Chile
- Region: Maule
- Province: Linares
- Commune: Colbún

Population (2002 Census)
  - Total: 1,473
- Time zone: UTC-4 (CLT)
  - Summer (DST): UTC-3 (CLST)
- Area code: 56 +

Panimávida (in Mapudungun: "hill of pumas") is a town in the Chilean commune of Colbún, Linares Province, Maule Region. Panimávida is well known in Chile for being one of the country's oldest hot springs and resort spas. Its population as of 2002 was 1,473 (737 male, 736 female).

From 1913 to 1954, Panimávida was a station on the narrow gauge Putagán—Colbún railway line between Linares and Colbún.

== Climate ==
Climate data for Panimavida
Month	Jan	Feb	Mar	Apr	May	Jun	Jul	Aug	Sep	Oct	Nov	Dec	Year
Mean daily maximum °C (°F)	28.2 (82.8)	27.2 (81.0)	24.9 (76.8)	20.2 (68.4)	15.6 (60.1)	12.3 (54.1)	12.6 (54.7)	14.0 (57.2)	17.3 (63.1)	20.0 (68.0)	23.2 (73.8)	27.0 (80.6)	20.2 (68.4)
Daily mean °C (°F)	19.6 (67.3)	17.8 (64.0)	15.7 (60.3)	12.2 (54.0)	10.3 (50.5)	7.9 (46.2)	7.8 (46.0)	8.5 (47.3)	10.5 (50.9)	12.8 (55.0)	16.0 (60.8)	18.8 (65.8)	13.2 (55.7)
Mean daily minimum °C (°F)	10.6 (51.1)	9.4 (48.9)	8.1 (46.6)	5.9 (42.6)	6.1 (43.0)	4.5 (40.1)	4.0 (39.2)	3.8 (38.8)	4.8 (40.6)	6.2 (43.2)	7.9 (46.2)	9.9 (49.8)	6.8 (44.2)
Average precipitation mm (inches)	16.8 (0.66)	11.9 (0.47)	32.4 (1.28)	65.1 (2.56)	197.2 (7.76)	219.9 (8.66)	186.5 (7.34)	155.9 (6.14)	98.3 (3.87)	55.9 (2.20)	31.6 (1.24)	18.0 (0.71)	1,089.5 (42.89)
Source: Meteorología Interactiva
