= Roman Catholic Diocese of Linares =

Latin Catholic jurisdiction in Chile

Coordinates: 35.8456°S 71.5992°W

Diocese of Linares Dioecesis Linarensis Diócesis de Linares

Catholic
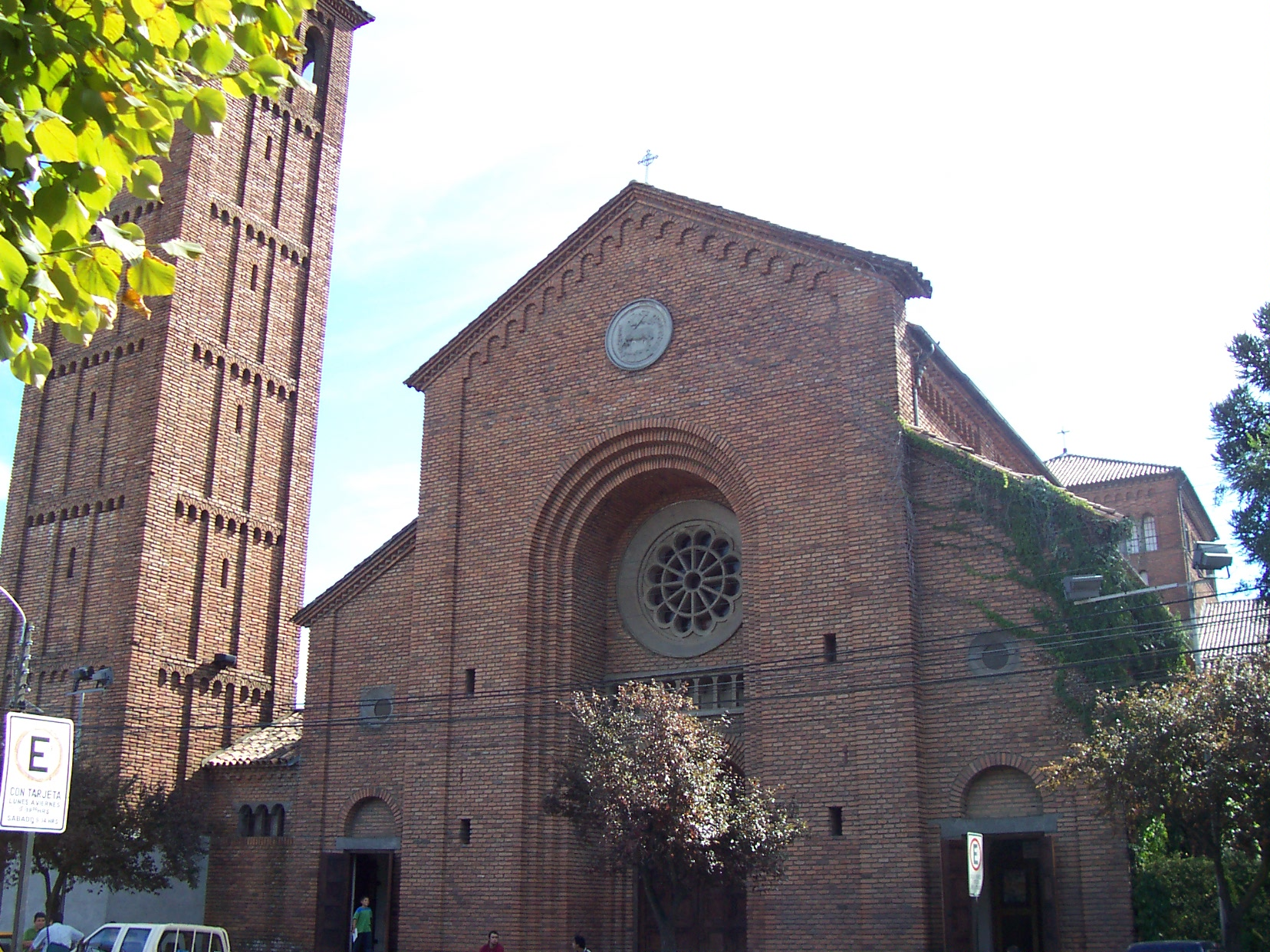
- Cathedral of St. Ambrose

Location
- Country: Chile
- Ecclesiastical province: Santiago de Chile

Statistics
- Area: 15,110 km^{2} (5,830 sq mi)
- Population: Total; Catholics: (as of 2004); 361,384; 271,038 (75%)

Information
- Denomination: Catholic Church
- Sui iuris church: Latin Church
- Rite: Roman Rite
- Established: 18 October 1925 (101 years ago)
- Cathedral: Cathedral of St Ambrose in Linares
- Patron saint: St Ambrose

Current leadership
- Pope: Leo XIV
- Bishop: Tomislav Koljatic Maroevic
- Metropolitan Archbishop: Celestino Aós Braco, OFM Cap

Website
- obispadodelinares.cl

The Diocese of Linares (also known as the Diocese of San Ambrosio de Linares; Latin: Dioecesis Linarensis) is a Latin Church ecclesiastical territory or diocese of the Catholic Church in Linares, Chile. It was established by Pope Pius XI on October 18, 1925 in his papal bull Notabiliter Aucto.

The Diocese of Linares is a suffragan in the ecclesiastical province of the metropolitan Archdiocese of Santiago de Chile. The diocese is located in the geographical center of Chile. The diocesan territory comprises two Chilean full provinces, Linares Province and Cauquenes Province, and part of a third, Talca Province, all of them in the Maule Region of Chile.

== Diocesan statistics ==
The Diocese of Linares has an area of 15,111 km^{2} and a population close to 350,000.

== Deaneries and parishes ==
There are 33 parishes grouped into six Deaneries, including: Urban Linares, Parral, Cauquenes, Constitución, San Javier, Rural Linares.

== Ordinaries ==
=== Bishops of Linares ===
- Miguel León Prado (1925–1934)
- Juan Subercaseaux Errázuriz (1935–1940), appointed Archbishop of La Serena
- Francisco Javier Valdivia Pinedo (1940–1941)
- Roberto Moreira Martínez (1941–1958)
- Augusto Osvaldo Salinas Fuenzalida (1958–1976)
- Carlos Marcio Camus Larenas (1976–2003)
- Tomislav Koljatic Maroevic (2003–present)
