= Yerbas Buenas =

- Town and Commune
- Flag Location of the Yerbas Buenas commune in the Maule Region Location in Chile
- Coordinates (city): 35°45′S 71°34′W
- Country: Chile
- Region: Maule
- Province: Linares
- Founded: 1744

Government
  - Type: Municipality
  - Mayor: Rafael Viguera González

Area
  - Total: 262.1 km^{2} (101.2 sq mi)
- Elevation: 136 m (446 ft)

Population (2012 Census)
  - Total: 16,738
  - Density: 63.86/km^{2} (165.4/sq mi)
  - Urban: 1,595
  - Rural: 14,539
- Demonym: Yerbabuenino

Sex
  - Men: 10,007
  - Women: 10,028
- Time zone: UTC-4 (CLT)
  - Summer (DST): UTC-3 (CLST)
- Postal code: 3600000
- Area code: 56 + 73
- Website: Municipality of Yerbas Buenas

Yerbas Buenas is a Chilean town and commune in Linares Province, Maule Region. It lies in the geographical center of the country, on the fertile central plain, some 300 km (186 mi) south of the national capital of Santiago, 50 km (31 mi) south of Talca, the regional capital and 12 km (7 mi) north of Linares, the provincial capital.

== Demography ==
According to the 2002 census of the National Statistics Institute, Yerbas Buenas had a population of 16,134 (8,380 men and 7,754 women). Of these, 1,595 (9.9%) lived in urban areas (the town of Yerbas Buenas), and 14,539 (90.1%) lived in rural areas. The population grew 4.1% (634 persons) between the censuses of 1992 and 2002.

== Geography ==
The commune covers an area of 262.1 km^{2} (101 sq mi). Its entire territory lies within the central plain or "depresión intermedia", (Chilean Central Valley). Yerbas Buenas is bordered on the west by San Javier and Villa Alegre, on the north by San Clemente, (Talca Province); on the east, by Colbún, and on the south, by Linares.

Geographic Coordinates

- Altitude: 139 m (456 ft)
- Latitude: 35°45′00″S
- Longitude: 71°34′00″W

== Heritage ==
Yerbas Buenas is a historical town with a cultural heritage and distinctive Spanish-style architecture. The town is a typical example of the preserved rural colonial architecture found sometimes in small towns and in large haciendas (estates) in Latin America. Whole streets are composed only of Spanish-style buildings from the colonial period, which is very rare in Chile.

=== Historical Museum ===
The Historical Museum of Yerbas Buenas is housed in a preserved, colonial building that is not only one of the oldest surviving in the town and province but also a silent witness of the dawn of Chile's independence. This was the house where the Spanish brigadier Antonio Pareja, commander of the royalist army, stayed on the night of April 26, 1813, the eve of the first significant military encounter between the royalist and the patriot armies in the independence struggle of Chile. Colonel Juan de Dios Puga, commander of the patriot force, was killed in the battle as was one third of his army. This building became a National Historic Monument on August 22, 1984 and the sector of the town around the building has been declared a "Typical Zone" (Zona típica).

== Administration ==
As a commune, Yerbas Buenas is a third-level administrative division of Chile administered by a municipal council, headed by an alcalde who is directly elected every four years. The 2024-2028 Mayor is Rafael Viguera González.The municipal council has the following members:

- José Parra Parada (UDI)
- Rodrigo González Villalobos (RN)
- Flavio Hernán Ramos Gutiérrez (PPD)
- Cristina Zehender Soto (DC)
- Michael Mendez Gonzalez (UDI)
- Cristián Patricio Fuentealba Retamal (PR)

Within the electoral divisions of Chile, Yerbas Buenas is represented in the Chamber of Deputies by Jorge Tarud (PDC) and Romilio Gutiérrez (UDI) as part of the 39th electoral district, together with Linares, Colbún, San Javier and Villa Alegre. The commune is represented in the Senate by Hernán Larraín (UDI) and Ximena Rincón González (PDC) as part of the 11th senatorial constituency (Maule-South).
