= Loncomilla River =

River in Chile

Coordinates: 35.62500°S 71.74373°W

Loncomilla River

Loncomilla River (Mapudungun for "Gold of the Chief") is a tributary to the Maule river in Linares Province, Maule Region, Chile. Two rivers join to form the Loncomilla River: the Perquilauquén river and Longaví river.

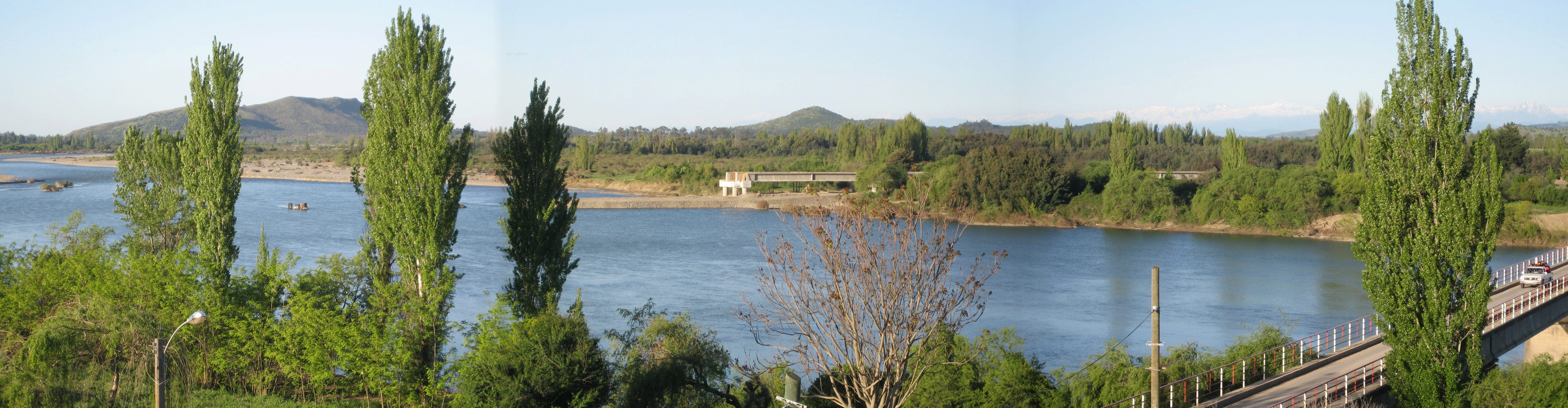
The Loncomilla River in Linares province, Chile. Siphon Bridge is at the right, and a new bridge (since 2010) is viewable at the left.

== See also ==
- List of rivers of Chile
