= Linares Province =

Linares
- Province
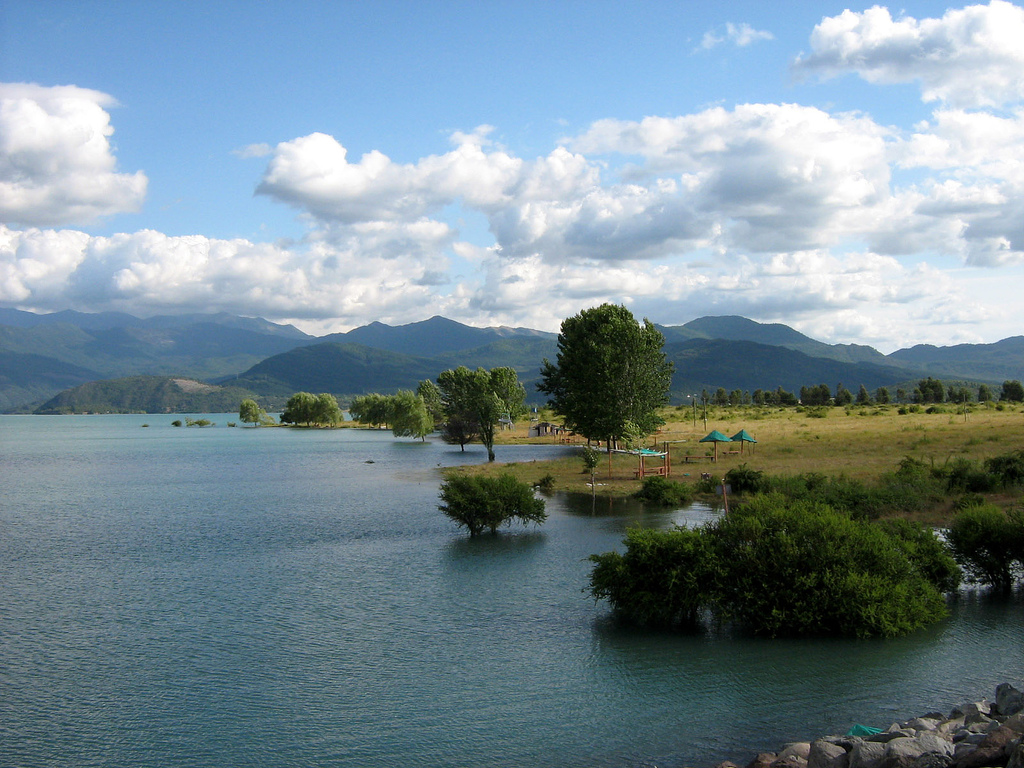
- Lake Colbun

- Seal Location in Chile
- Coordinates: 35°50′S 71°35′W
- Country: Chile
- Region: Maule
- Capital: Linares
- Communes: List of 8: Linares; San Javier; Villa Alegre; Yerbas Buenas; Colbún; Longaví; Retiro; Parral

Government
  - Type: Provincial
  - Presidential Provincial Delegate: Aly Valderrama Villaroel

Area
  - Total: 10,050.2 km^{2} (3,880.4 sq mi)

Population (2012 Census)
  - Total: 264,292
  - Density: 26.2972/km^{2} (68.1094/sq mi)
  - Urban: 139,742
  - Rural: 114,248

Sex
  - Men: 127,063
  - Women: 126,927
- Time zone: UTC-4 (CLT)
  - Summer (DST): UTC-3 (CLST)
- Area code: 56 + 73
- Website: Delegation of Linares

Linares (Spanish: Provincia de Linares) is one of four provinces of the central Chilean region of Maule (VII). The provincial capital and most populous center is the city of Linares.

== Administration ==
As a province, Cachapoal is a second-level administrative division of Chile, governed by a provincial delegate who is appointed by the president. The provincial delegate is Priscila González Carrillo, a Communist.

=== Communes ===
The province comprises eight communes, each governed by a municipality consisting of an alcalde and municipal council.

- Linares (the provincial capital)
- San Javier
- Villa Alegre
- Yerbas Buenas
- Colbún
- Longaví
- Retiro
- Parral

== Geography and demography ==
The province is located at the very center of mainland Chile, and its capital lies 303 km south of Santiago and 50 km south of Talca, the regional capital, in the middle of a rich agricultural and wine-growing area. According to the 2002 census by the National Statistics Institute (INE), the province spans an area of 10,041.2 km^{2} (3,877 sq mi) and had a population of 270,990 inhabitants (127,063 men and 126,927 women), giving it a population density of 25.3/km^{2} (66/sq mi). Between the 1992 and 2002 censuses, the population grew by 3.1% (7,699 persons). Forty five percent of the population of the province live in rural areas, as compared with 33% in the Maule Region and 13% in Chile as a whole. This characteristic gives Linares a special cultural and socioeconomic profile among the Chilean provinces.

== Climate ==
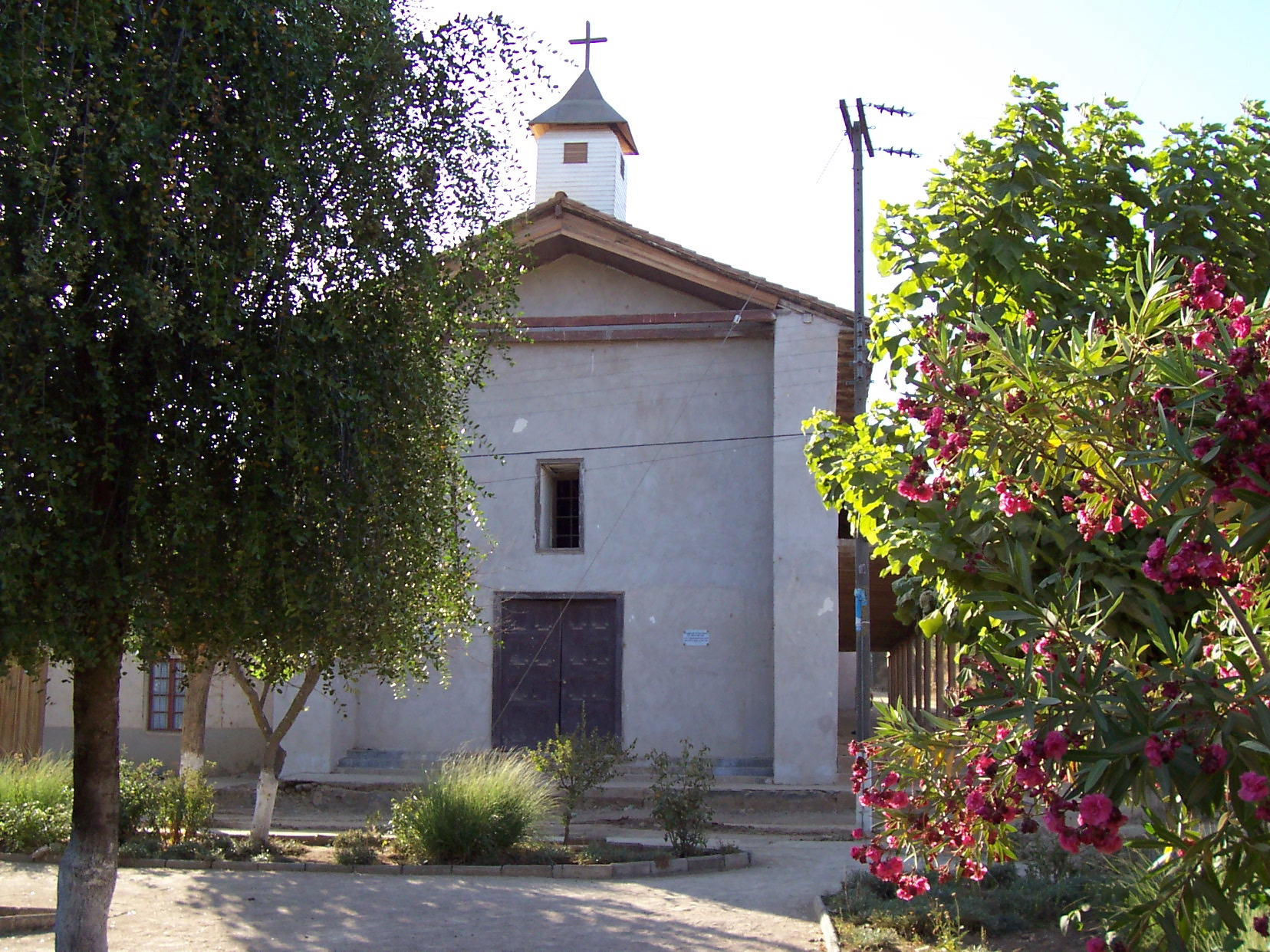
Parish church of the village of Nirivilo, San Javier comuna, Linares Province, Chile. The building dates from Chile's colonial period. The parish belongs to the Linares Diocese

Linares has a mild Mediterranean climate. The summers are hot and mainly dry (November to March) with temperatures reaching up to 32 degrees Celsius on the hottest days. The winters (late May to mid September) tend to be rather humid and rainy, with typical maximum daily temperatures of 15 degrees Celsius, and minimum just above freezing. The rainfall is more abundant in the eastern as well as the southern part of the province (Parral), and the effects of this are seen in the good conditions for rice cultivation in the latter area. Irrigation is used to a large extent.

== Economy ==
Thanks to favorable climatic conditions and good natural irrigation, the province of Linares has been able to diversify its agriculture. Also, the wine making industry has been making inroads in both national and international markets. The province's major and more profitable crops include cereals (rice, wheat, and maize among them), vegetables (tomatoes, cauliflower, lettuce, onions, and artichokes), legumes (lentils and beans), fruit (especially kiwi fruit, pears, apples, berries, table grapes, melons, watermelons, peaches, and nectarines), and sugar beets. Several varieties of wine are produced in the province, which is part of the Maule Valley, a sub-region of the viticultural region of the Chilean Central Valley.

Linares produces 74% of the Chilean rice crop, particularly in the area around Parral. The province exports wines, table grapes, kiwi fruit, berries, and several other agricultural products. The city of Linares is an important center of the Chilean sugar-beet industry.

== Culture ==
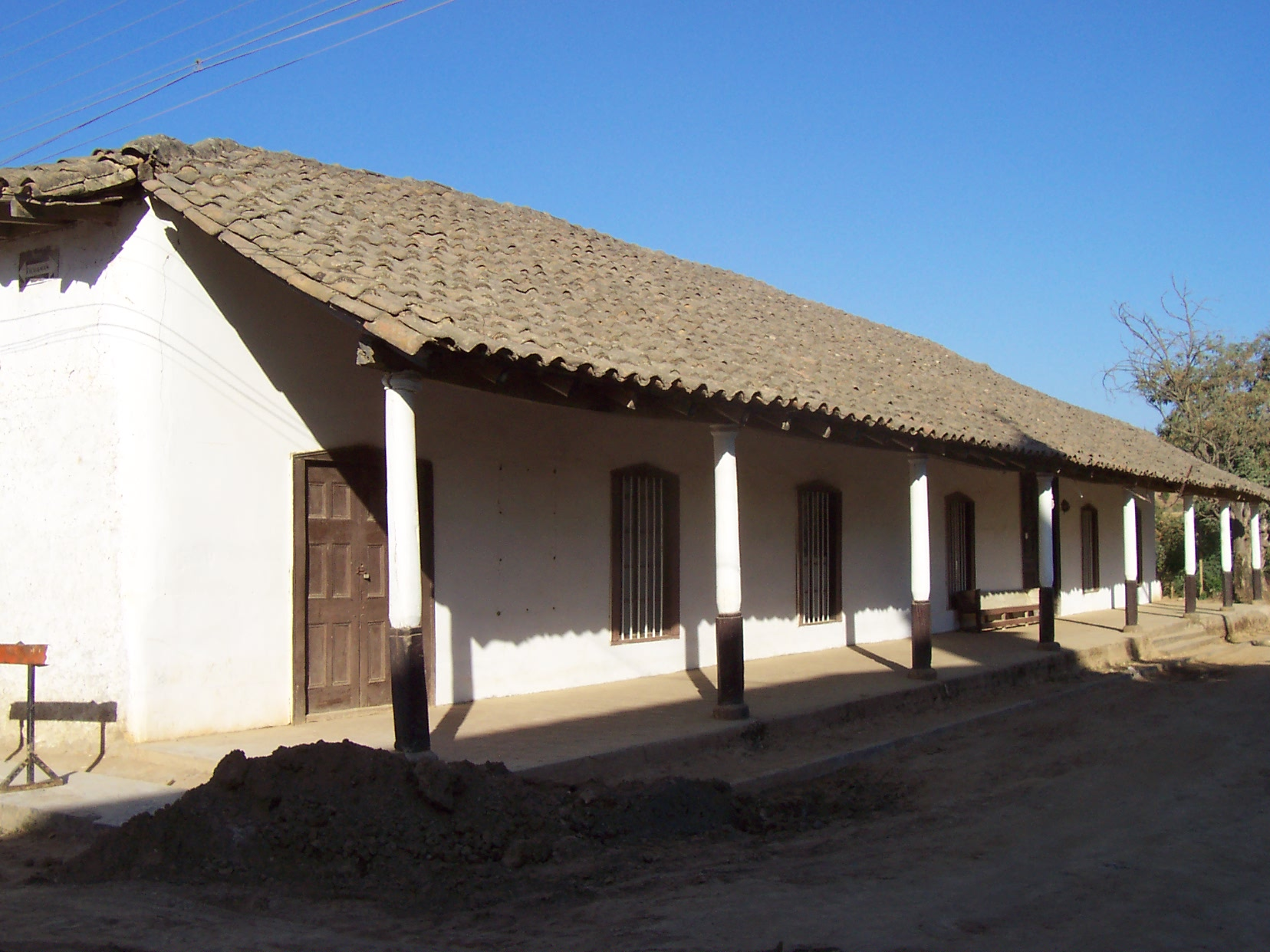
A typical, well-preserved, colonial-style rural house in the village of Nirivilo, San Javier comuna, Chile

A remarkable number of writers, poets and, in general, intellectuals (see below) have been born in the province of Linares. Among them is Pablo Neruda, the famous poet and Nobel Prize-winner, who was born in the city of Parral. Also, the province of Linares is home to some of the best folklore in Chile, and one of its most famous folklorists is Margot Loyola Palacios, noted singer, composer and folklore researcher and erudite. There are many active folklore groups in the province.

=== Notable people born in the province of Linares ===
- Pablo Neruda, famous poet and Nobel Prize winner, born in Parral, Linares Province
- Juan Ignacio Molina (Abate Molina), a Chilean priest and naturalist.
- Carlos Ibáñez del Campo, Army General and twice the President of Chile;
- Arturo Alessandri Palma, politician, statesman and twice the President of Chile
- Margot Loyola Palacios, noted folk musician and researcher
- Edilberto Domarchi Villagra, writer and poet
- Eduardo Anguita, writer
- Max Jara, writer
- Jerónimo Lagos Lisboa, writer and poet

== Villages ==
- Abránquil
