= Diego Vergara Albano =

Chilean independence activist, deputy, senator, and landowner

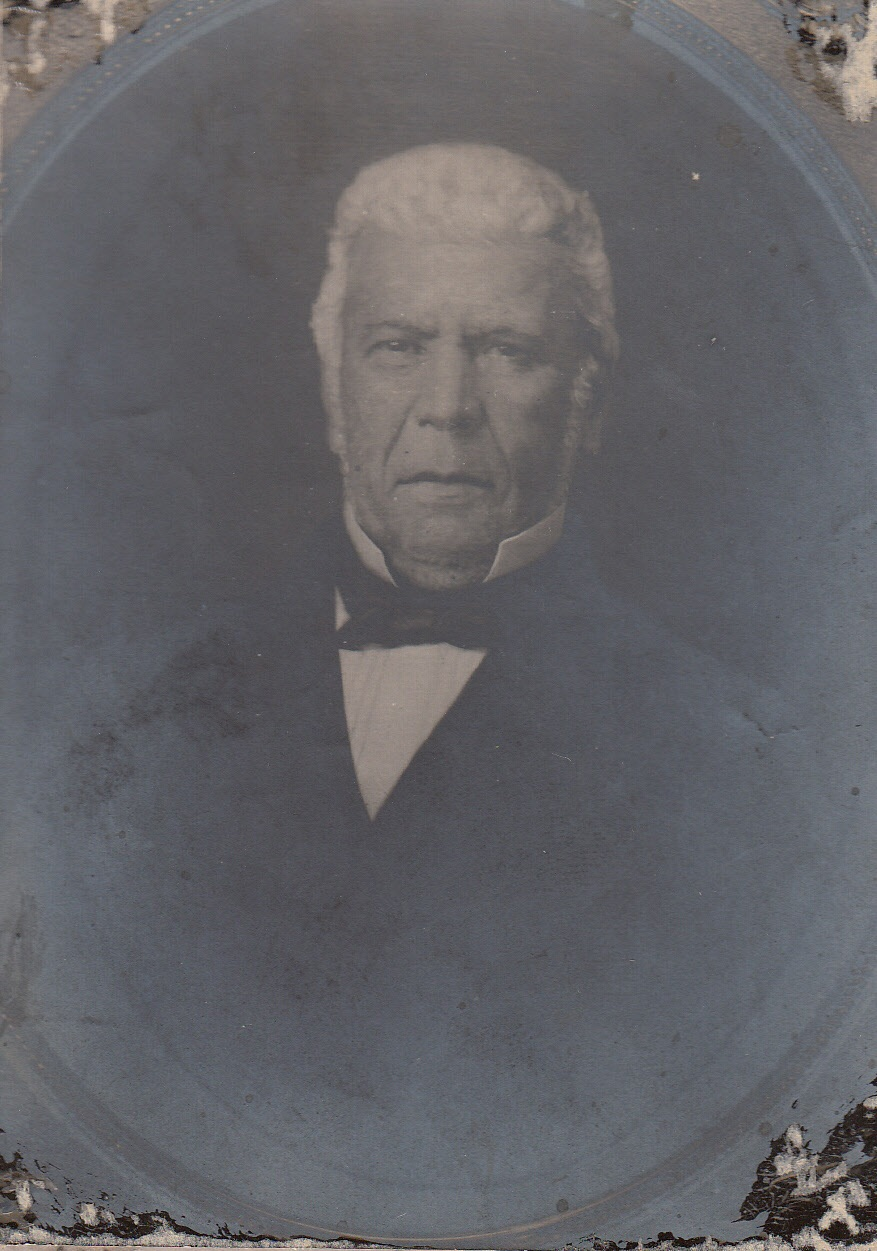

Senator of the Republic of Chile
- In office 1876–1882

Deputy of the Republic of Chile
- In office 1864–1867
- In office 1861–1864
- In office 1858–1861

Personal details
- Born: November 11, 1803 Talca, Captaincy General of Chile, Viceroyalty of Peru
- Died: August 8, 1877 (aged 73) Santiago, CHL
- Spouse(s): Jesús Antúnez Cruz; María Jesús Correa Albano (2nd Marriage with 10 children)
- Children: Francisca de Borja, Jesús, Isabel, Diego, Bonifacio, José, María Mercedes, Teresa, José Luis, and María Gertrudis

Diego Vergara Albano (11 November 1803 – 8 August 1877) was a Chilean independence activist, deputy, senator, and landowner.

== Family ==
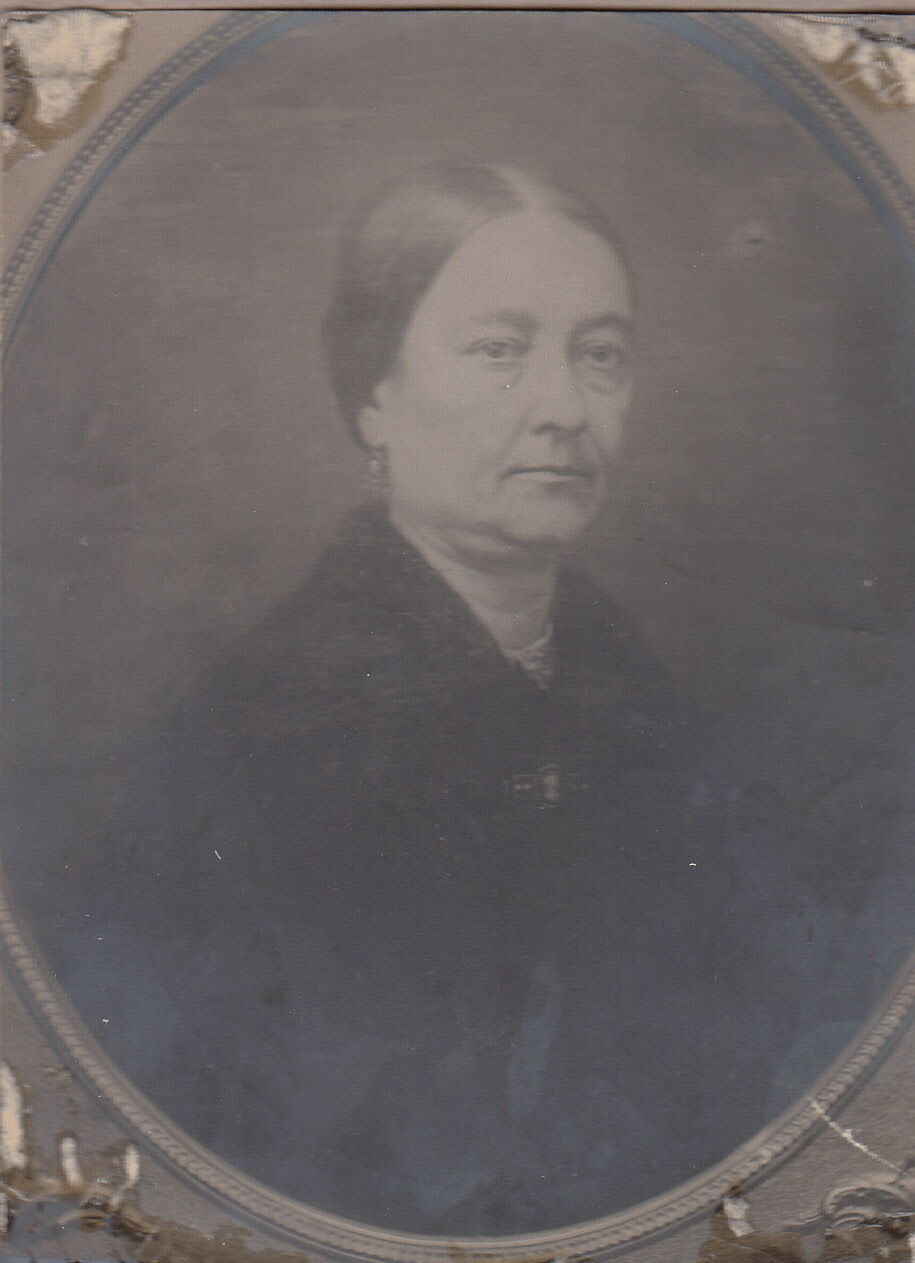
His wife Jesús Correa Albano with whom he had ten children.

He was the son of Ramón Martínez de Vergara y Rojas-Puebla and Francisca de Borja Albano Cruz – daughter of Juan Albano Pereira Márquez. He was a nephew of Vicente de la Cruz y Bahamonde, Juan Manuel de la Cruz y Bahamonde, Anselmo de la Cruz y Bahamonde, and Nicolas de la Cruz y Bahamonde. He was a first cousin of Pedro Nolasco Vergara Albano, Juan Albano Cruz, and Casimiro Albano Cruz.

He married Jesús Antúnez Cruz in Talca and, in a second marriage, in Lontué on January 5, 1832, he married María Jesús Correa Albano, with whom he had ten children: Francisca de Borja, Jesús, Isabel, Diego, Bonifacio, José, María Mercedes, Teresa, José Luis, and María Gertrudis.

== Public activities ==
His first public position was as a judge of supplies of the Talca council. He acted as part of the patriots in the independence of Chile, participating on April 17, 1830, in the battle of Lircay, where he joined the troops of Ramón Freire.

Subsequently, between 1846 and 1849, he was a councilor of Talca. From 1858 to 1861, he was a deputy for Lontué, a large estate that was his property, forming the Permanent Commission of Ecclesiastical Affairs. Between 1861 and 1864, he was a deputy for the Linares Department, forming the Permanent Commission of Elections and Qualification of Requests. From 1864 to 1867, he was a deputy substitute for Lontué, replacing the titular deputy until his incorporation on July 19, 1864. Between 1876 and 1882, he was a substitute senator for Talca.

== See also ==
- Vergara family
- Cruz Family
- Founding of Talca
