= Juan Ignacio Molina =

Chilean priest, historian, and naturalist

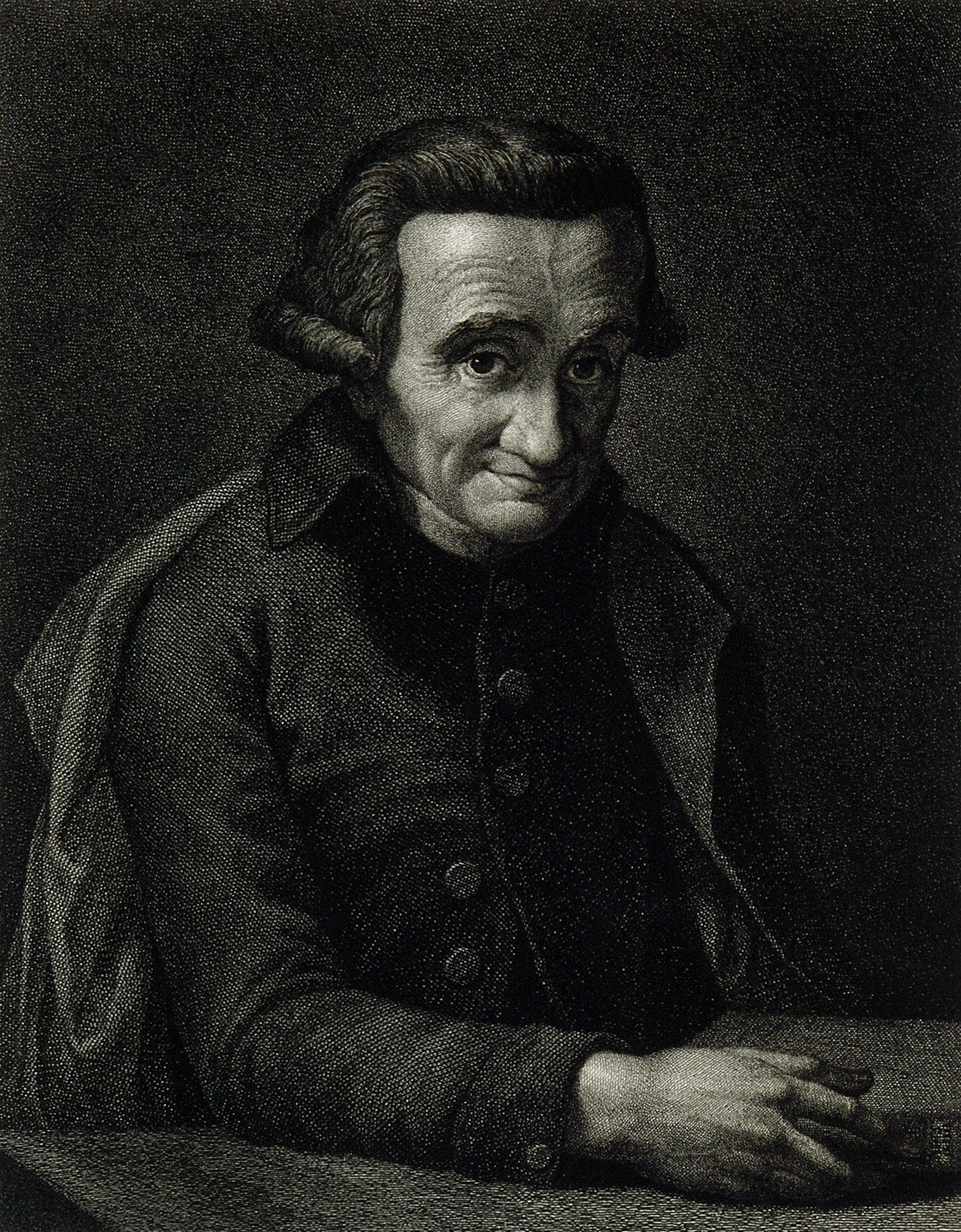
- Line engraving by F. Rosaspina, 1805
- Born: 24 June 1740; Guaraculén, Captaincy General of Chile (now Chile)
- Died: 12 September 1829 (aged 89); Bologna, Papal States (now Italy)
- Resting place: Villa Alegre, Chile
- Other name: Abate Molina
- Scientific career
- Fields: Priest, naturalist, historian, translator, geographer, botanist, ornithologist, scientific, linguist.
- Institutions: University of Bologna
- Author abbrev. (botany): Molina
- Author abbrev. (zoology): Molina

Fr. Juan Ignacio Molina (Spanish pronunciation: [xwan iɣˈnasjo moˈlina]; (June 24, 1740 – September 12, 1829) was a Chilean-Spanish Jesuit priest, naturalist, historian, translator, geographer, botanist, ornithologist, and linguist. He is usually referred to as Abate Molina (Abbot Molina), and is also sometimes known by the Italian form of his name, Giovanni Ignazio Molina.

Together with his contemporaries Erasmus Darwin and Jean-Baptiste Lamarck, he was one of the proponents of the idea of the gradual evolution of species.

The standard author abbreviation Molina is used to indicate this person as the author when citing a botanical name.

== Biography ==
=== Early years ===
Molina was born at Guaraculén, a big farm located near Villa Alegre, (General Captaincy of Chile), where he lived until he was 5 years old. In the current province of Linares, in the Maule Region of Chile. His parents were Agustín Molina and Francisca González Bruna. From an early age he was attracted to the nature of his environment, and in addition to his school work, he enjoyed observing nature on the family farm, which he visited periodically, alternating with his studies. This is how Molina described his interest in nature:

"My character led me from my most tender years to observe nature and particularly animals, so while I lived in my country, Chile, I did all possible research. A set of known circumstances from around the world forced me to interrupt my observations (Suppression of the Society of Jesus)."

The family moved to Talca when Juan Ignacio was only five years old. At the same time, the Jesuits settled in the block called "las Arboledas", in the newly created Villa de Talca, where they built their residence house. In the north corner they built in their early years a humble house with a "thatch and straw roof", the place was used to install a "School of first Letters", an obligation imposed on them by the decree of installation of June 10, 1748. The reputation for intellectual excellence in the Order led the leading families of the city to enroll their children there. In that humble place, Molina took his first steps into the knowledge of human letters. With his shrewd intelligence he became known as a talented child, learning fast with a good memory. Thus, at a young age, with the consent of his superiors, he began his work as a teacher in the school of first letters.

As a result of his academic excellence – especially in Literature and Latin – he was accepted as a Jesuit at the age of fifteen. He had a novitiate in various locations of the Order, in Talca, Concepción and Santiago. He lived on the estate of Bucalemu in the area known today as El Convento in the El Yali wet land. In those calm and quiet conditions he revived the intellectual work that would later make him well known, Molina delved into the study of the classics and the natural sciences. His progress was very fast and within five years (he was 20 years old at the time) he already had a solid knowledge of Latin, Greek, French and Italian. That merit led him to be transferred in 1760 to the Jesuit residence in Santiago, where he worked as a librarian. In 1761, in a room at the Universidad Pontificia Colegio Máximo de San Miguel, Molina renounced his assets, setting aside 100 pesos from these that were reserved for the purchase of books.

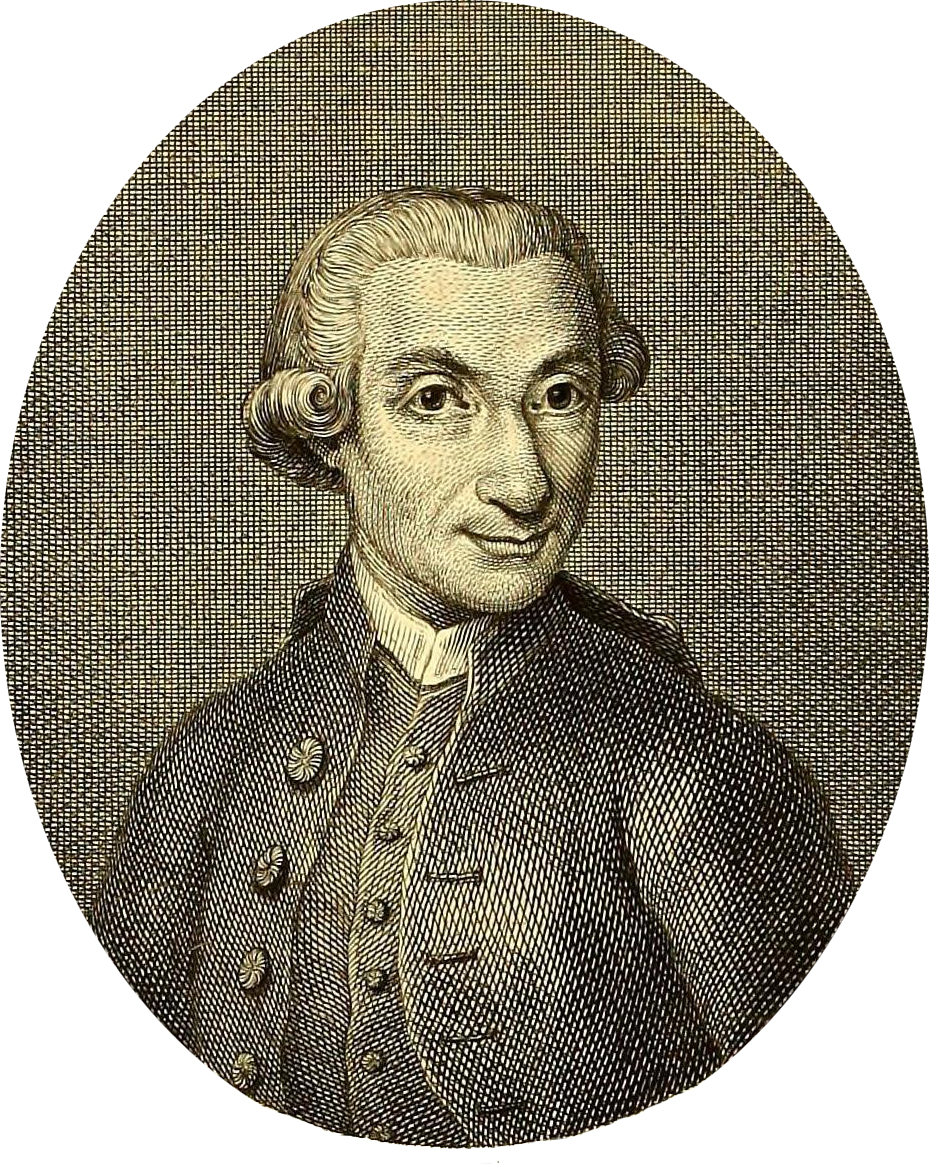
Young Juan Ignacio Molina, 1795.

=== Exile ===
In 1768 he was forced to leave Chile due to the Suppression of the Society of Jesus. He settled in Italy where, thanks to his linguistic skills, he obtained the chair of Greek language at the University of Bologna. He soon achieved a good reputation as a historian and geographer, due to his Saggio Sulla Storia Naturale del chili (1778) and Saggio Sulla Storia Civile del Chili (1787). Finally he became a professor of Natural Sciences (1803), given his studies in that area. For example, he published (1782) the Saggio Sulla Storia Naturale del Cile, in which he described the natural history of Chile for the first time and introduced numerous species native to that country to science. Furthermore, in that work he is also the first to mention the Paramillos de Uspallata mines, of lead, silver and zinc.

All of these works were translated, attracting considerable attention, into German, Spanish, French and English. In botany, it is regulatory and permissible to simply write "Molina" when a reference is made to any of his descriptions. He also reached the rank of member of the Royal Italian Institute of Sciences, Letters and Arts and the high dignity of the first American academic of the learned Academy of the Institute of Sciences. He became so renowned, that even Alexander von Humboldt visited him.

=== Published work ===
In his preparatory work he was meticulous and hardworking, visiting libraries and taking notes on everything that might interest him. The preserved strips of paper written in his own hand, show his industriousness. He was appreciated by his students, who considered him mild in his dealings and for his kind character. Molina taught them Latin, rhetoric, geography, and history. In response, his students gave him snuff and coffee, two of the passions of the elderly priest, who lived in a modest house on the outskirts of Bologna.

There was a considerable interest in "Less Observed Analogies of the Three Kingdoms of Nature" (1815) and On the "Propagation of Mankind in the Various Parts of the Earth" (1818). In the first he proposed a theory of gradual evolution. According to his proposition, the Creator organized nature not into three totally different kingdoms (animal, mineral, vegetable), but as a continuous chain of organization, without sudden steps or breaks, into «three species of life, that is, the formative, vegetative and sensitive life; so that the first, destined to minerals, participates to some degree in the second, typical of plants, and this, in the third, assigned to animals. Thus, for example, crystalline minerals precede the simplest plant forms. And complex plant organizations give way to animals. In the second mentioned work, Molina proposed the thesis that the observable physical differences in the human race are due to climatic and geographical factors.

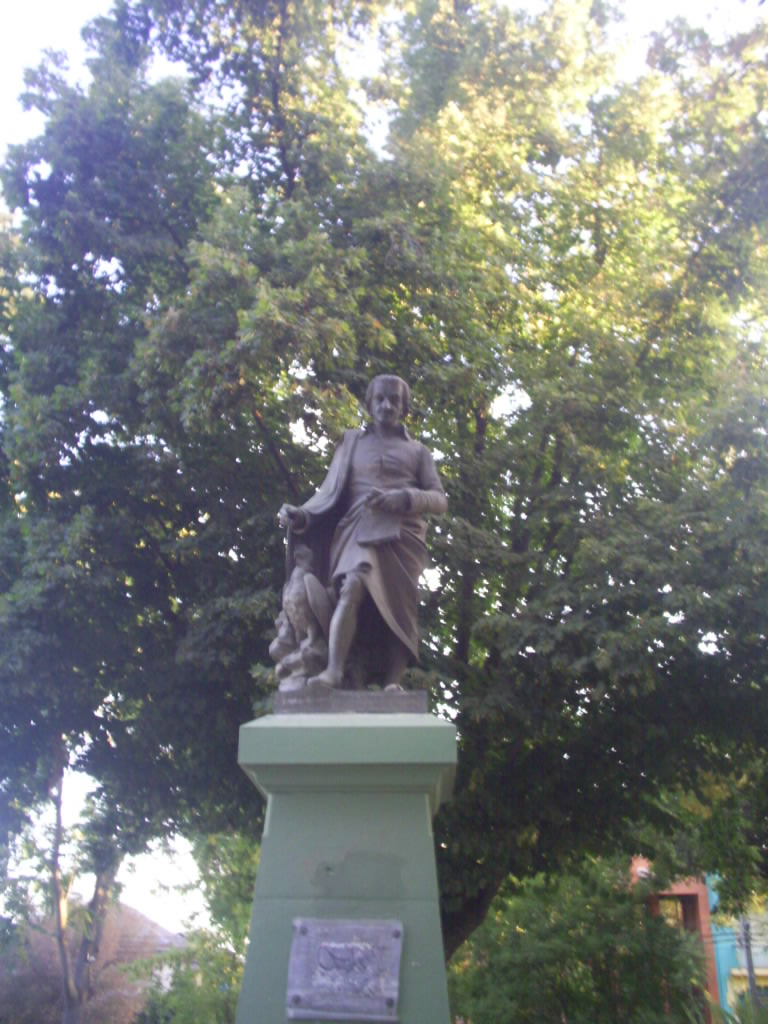
Fr. Molina statue in Talca

The impact that such ideas caused confusing episode were an ex-student of Molina, the illustrious Ronzoni, censor of the University of Bologna, accused him of heresy and the Bishop of Bologna ordered a council of theologians to examine his work. Logically, that committee found nothing against the faith in his writings and authorized their publication. Despite this, his Analogías could not be published for a long time because of the lateness of the bishop's decision, and only its original in Spanish was preserved in Italy. This may have cost Molina the chance to be known as one of the forerunners of the theory of evolution. Charles Darwin was aware of Molina as a naturalist, and referred to him four times in The Voyage of the Beagle, but he did not refer to him in The Origin of Species, as there is no indication that Molina anticipated the theory of natural selection.

=== Last years ===
Molina did not stop from being interested for the fate of his family. He corresponded with them until 1795. He knew of the death of his mother, his brother, and his nephew Agustín Molina, the only male in the family and heir to his grandparents' fortune. The ungrateful nephew, who never had a deference for his uncle who lived in exile beyond the seas, married Doña Manuela Vergara, with whom he was neither happy nor succeeded. Upon his death, which occurred suddenly in the houses of the Huaraculén hacienda in February 1815, his property was passed on to his uncle, who was the sole heir.

His other nephew, Don Ignacio Opazo Castro, owner of Panimávida and neighbor of the deceased don Agustín, took charge of his family's assets, which consisted of an Hacienda and the house of his parents, in Talca. A count was made of the homes, and yielded a total of $12,670 pesos. Ignacio Opazo exchanged correspondence with Molina, to give him an account of the diligence.

Juan Ignacio, with deep pain and sadness, replied by letter dated in Bologna on December 11, 1815, which reads as follows:

Dear nephew: I do not doubt that you allow me to treat you as a son, because I always had you for such the time that you were my disciple. I have received your letter, part with great pleasure, knowing that you live and enjoy health, and part with incredible pain for the dire news you give me of the death of my nephew Agustín, whom I hardly knew. In him my family dies, which had been preserved from father to son for more than two hundred years. I hope to leave from here, with our common relative, Bachiller, in the month of April or May and embark in Cádiz, on the way back from my beloved Chile. In the meantime, I beg you to administer the estate of the deceased in my name, with absolute power and in case I die on the trip, I will leave Bachiller my last disposition concerning the assets that exist, of which you will have a part. You do not tell me anything about your mother, nor about Josefina, who I fear are dead. It was more than twenty years that I had not received a letter from Chile, although I did not stop writing, when God provided the occasion. However, of my advanced age, I am still quite robust and in a state to undertake the passage of the sea. The desire to return to the homeland, to embrace you tenderly and to die among my people, will make my suffering soft and short. God grant me this grace, that since I left there I have always wished and so that the Lord himself may have the pleasure to keep you in perfect health for many years. Goodbye, dear Ignacio. Your uncle who has always loved you and loves you.

In this letter, he shows his ardent desire that his kind soul harbored to be among his loved ones again, to see the land of his parents and to rest forever in his land where he was born.

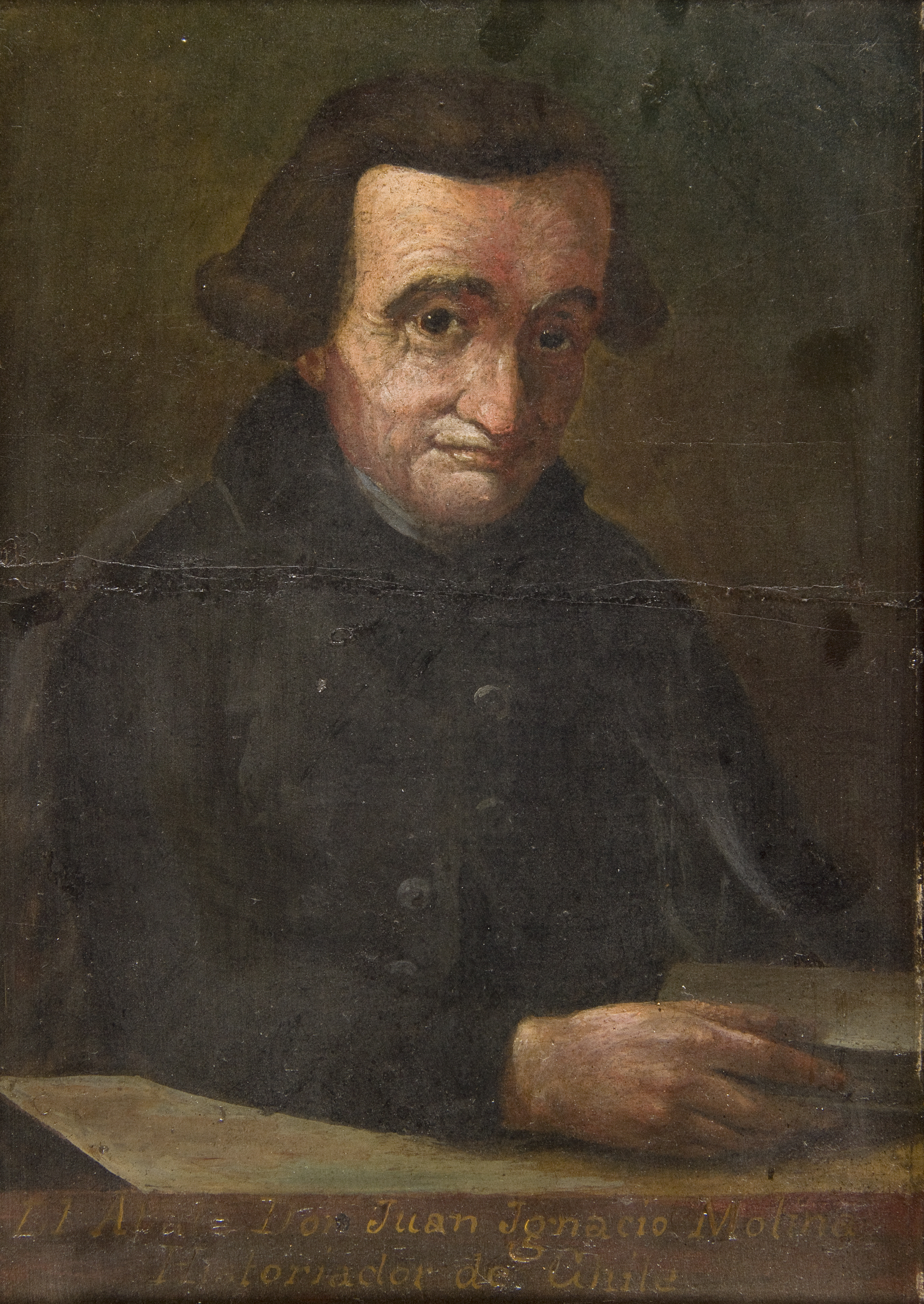
Juan Ignacio Molina, during his old age.

Molina was already 75 years old, when he thought about returning to Chile. The news of independence, along with the news that the Spanish Crown had reestablished the Jesuit Company in America. With such good news, he thought to move onto Cádiz in 1816, with his relative Manuel Bachiller to the home of his friend Nicolás de la Cruz Bahamonde, Conde del maule. Unfortunately it could not be carried out, since Don Ignacio Opazo, did not reach him to remit three thousand pesos that he asked for from his inheritance to make his trip. Because Ignacio died in Santiago in 1815.

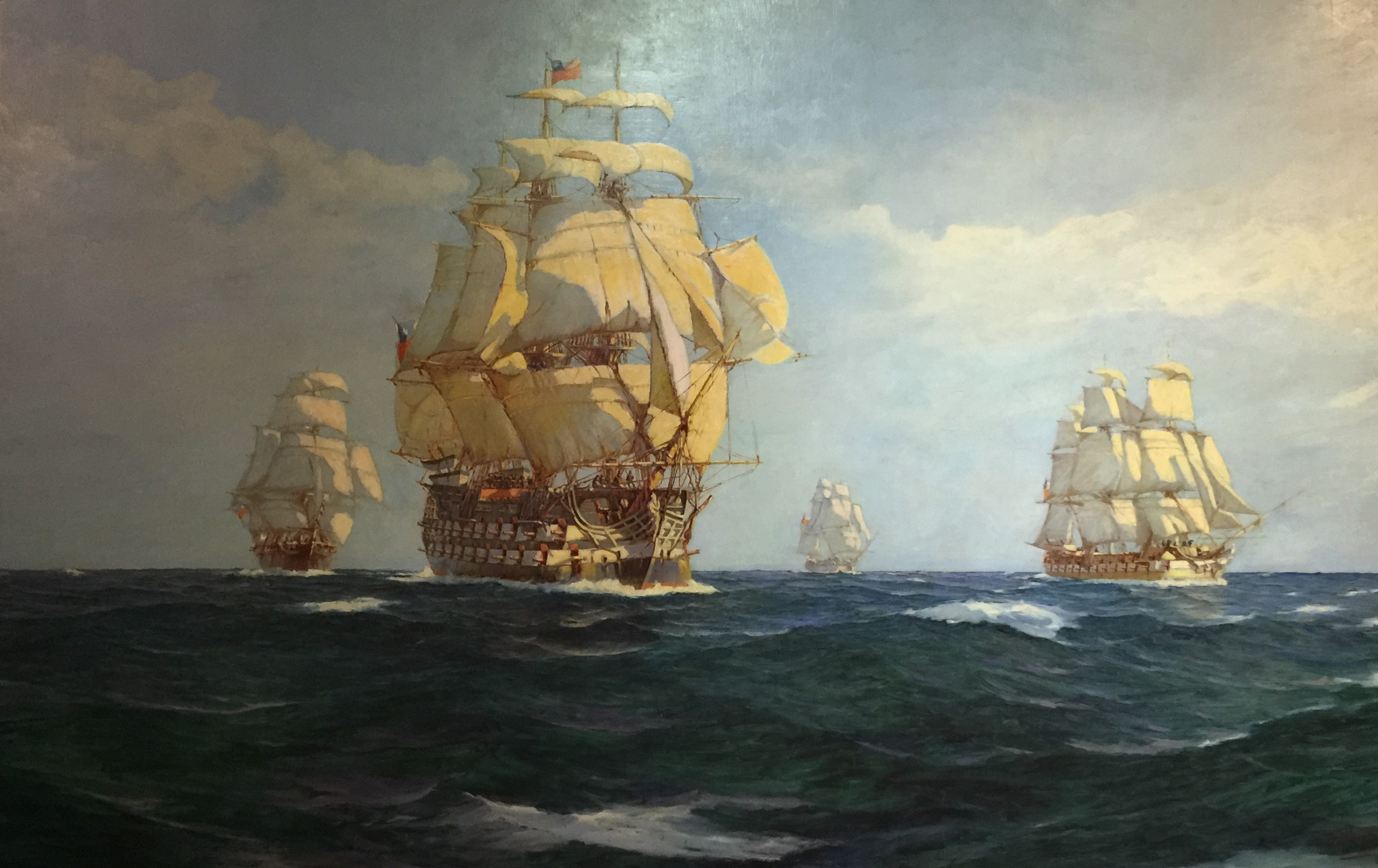
First Navy squad of Chile

With the death of his last relative, his inheritance ended up in the hands of various administrators, until they were completely abandoned. Faced with this dilemma, the authorities of the nascent Republic of Chile, confusing the money with that of a deceased Spaniard, allocated the money to the construction of the Primera escuadra nacional. Molina, in imposing himself on this decision, instead of feeling angry, he exclaimed:

Oh, what a beautiful determination the authorities of the Republic have made! In no other way could they have interpreted my will better than how they have, provided that everything has to be for the benefit of the country!

By agreement of the Senate of Chile, dated May 27, 1820, the money was returned to him.

Molina continued in Bologna. He lived wrapped in affection by all those who knew him. Of his fellow exiles, only Agustín Zambrano, a nonagenarian, remained.

In 1823 he received a visit from José Ignacio Cienfuegos. This visit filled the old abbe with hope. Cienfuegos updated him on what was happening in Chile and the monarchist counterrevolution. Despite his age, Molina once again felt the desire to undertake the journey to his homeland.

"He wanted to come back with me" says Cienfuegos, "to have the pleasure of seeing his beloved land, whose freedom had been so placid, and he eagerly wanted to come and give hugs to his compatriots, which he could not achieve due to his advanced age."

During his conversation with Cienfuegos, he expressed his desire to dedicate his fortune to the construction of a house of education in Talca. Cienfuegos did the diligences, and the project was carried out successfully. Creating a Literary Institute Talca, in which Spanish grammar, Latin, Philosophy and Theology would be taught.

The abbe thus had the satisfaction of seeing his work begun. Since 1814 he had felt his health decline, but he remained in good condition until 1825; he could read with ease, teach poor children for free, and go on his daily walk. Since then the flame of his existence has been slowly extinguished. Confined to his home, the idea of death came naturally to him. His true evil was the old age, in his last days a slow and painful agony made him suffer great bitterness and a constant and devouring thirst. "Agua fresca de la Cordillera!" which means: "Fresh water from the Cordillera!". He asked in his delusions, remembering that river of pure water, from the Andes Mountains in Chile. On September 12, 1829, at eight o'clock at night, he died.

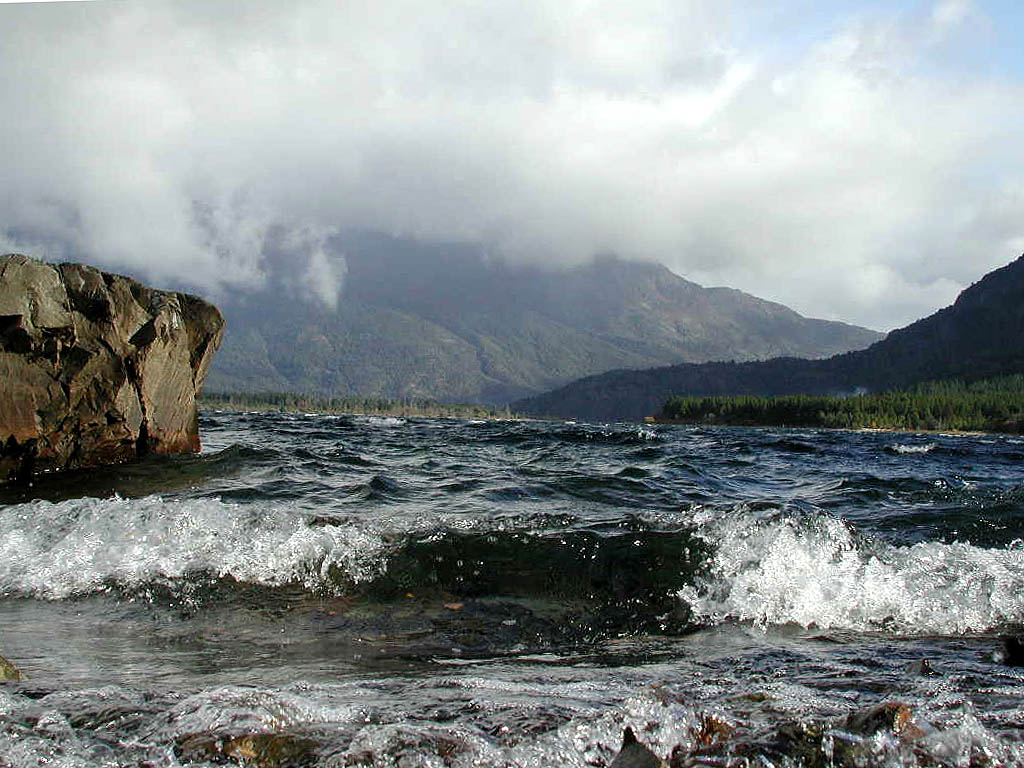
Cordillera de los Andes water

=== Scientific work ===
As a scientist native to the Americas Molina was very critical of the work of Cornelius de Pauw, who was in Europe regarded as an expert on the Americas, and accused him of "always attempting to degrade and discredit the Americas". Some of De Pauw's statements on the supposedly poor aspects of the mineral wealth of the Americas were countered by Molina as well as De Pauw's claims on the shorter lives of people that inhabited the Americas.

Molina expressed support for a sedimentary origin of basalt in Ensayo sobre la historia natural de Chile where he pointed out the fact that basalt occurred both in the Andes and in coast of Chiloé where there were no sign of eruption and believed basalt to be a sort of compacted slate with vesicles.

As early as 1787 Molina mentioned the possibility of South America being populated from south Asia through the "infinite island chains" of the Pacific while North America could have been populated from Siberia.

== Botanical taxonomy ==
Ruiz and Pavón dedicated to him the plant genus Molina, later considered a subgenus of Baccharis by Wilhelm Heering (Reiche 1902), and recently recreated as Neomolina by F.H. Hellwig and ranked as genus. Other authors dedicated Moliniopsis, a genus of Poaceae. Molina has also been linked to the naming of the genus Maytenus.

== Zoological taxonomy ==
A species of Chilean lizard, Liolaemus molinai, is named in his honor. A species of South American parakeet, Pyrrhura molinae, was named in his honor (Massena and Souance, 1854). Rev.et Mag. Zool. (2), 6, 1854, p.73.

== See also ==
- Spanish Universalist School of the 18th century
- Juan Andrés
- Lorenzo Hervás
- Francisco Javier Clavijero
- Miguel de Olivares
- Alonso de Ovalle
- Juan de la Cruz y Bernardotte
- List of Jesuit scientists
- List of Roman Catholic scientist-clerics
- Founding of Talca
- Pedro Nolasco Vergara Albano
- Juan Albano Pereira Márquez

== Sources ==
- Hellwig, H. F. (1993). The genera Pingraea Cassini and Neomolina Hellwig Candollea (PDF). Vol. 48. Santiago, Chile. p. 212. Archived from the original (PDF) on June 21, 2006.
- Reiche, K. F. (1902). Estudios críticos sobre la flora de Chile. Anales de la Universidad de Chile (in Spanish). Vol. 111. Santiago, Chile. pp. 153–183.
- Herbermann, Charles, ed. (1913). "Juan Ignacio Molina" . Catholic Encyclopedia. New York: Robert Appleton Company.
