= Francisco Javier Correa Errázuriz =

Chilean farmer and deputy (1879–1934)

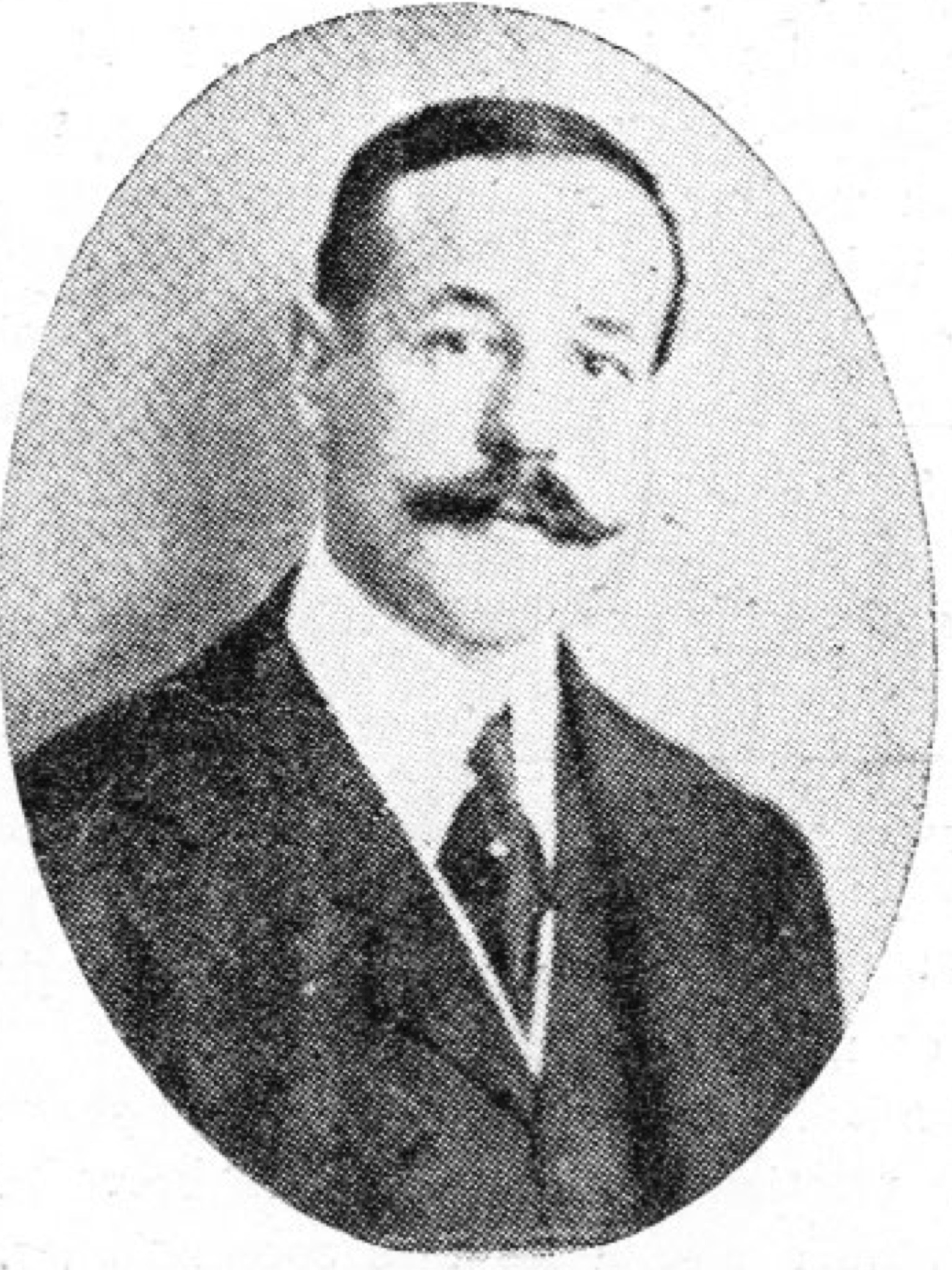
Francisco Javier Correa Errázuriz (undated)

Francisco Javier Bonifacio Hermojenes Correa Errázuriz (Santiago de Chile, October 10, 1870 - Lontué, June 14, 1934) was a Chilean farmer and deputy.

== Family ==
Son of Bonifacio Correa Albano and Mercedes Errázuriz Valdivieso. He married Luz Pereira Gandarillas on December 15, 1892, with whom he had eight children: Carlos, Fernando, María, Blanca, Teresa, Luz, Francisco Javier y Raul Bonifacio.

On his paternal side he's the Great-Great-grandson of Juan Albano Pereira Márquez. He is the nephew of José Gregorio and Vicente Correa Albano. Cousin of Elías Fernández Albano, Diego Vergara Correa, José Bonifacio Vergara Correa, Guillermo Correa Vergara, Pedro Nolasco Cruz Vergara, Luis Correa Vergara and Pedro Correa Ovalle.

On the other hand, in his maternal side he's the grandson of Francisco Javier Errázuriz Aldunate, Cousin of Federico Errázuriz Echaurren, and nephew of Federico Errázuriz Zañartu, Crescente Errázuriz, and Maximiano Errázuriz

== Studies ==
He studied at St. Ignatius College since 1890, finishing his studies in Belgium. He later studied law at the Catholic University of Chile, graduating in 1900 as a lawyer from this private university.

== Private life ==
He worked in winemaking at Viña Lontué, which at the time was the largest individually owned vineyard in the world: 700 hectares planted, when the second largest, Baron Rothschild's Château Lafite, had only 70 hectares.4 Founded by his father in 1875, he modernized and renovated all of the vineyard's production processes, turning it into a powerful production center. He modernized and renewed all the productive processes of the vineyard, turning it into a powerful production center and with them the modernization of its distribution and sales services. In 1914 it reached eight million of wine, and also owned large cellars where wines of all kinds were produced and aged, consumed inside and outside the country; the technical direction was in the hands of a French oenologist. In 1925 the winery celebrated its fiftieth anniversary with majestic celebrations, such as a great party and the Santiago-Lontué automobile race.

In 1914, the Swiss immigrant Eduardo Frei Schlinz, father of the later President of the Republic Eduardo Frei Montalva, then three years old, arrived to work as an accountant at this wine producer. Frei Montalva did his first studies in the precarious school that depended on the Correa Errázuriz estate, whose records, inherited by the current “Presidente Eduardo Frei Montalva” public school, show the poor teaching conditions of those years. In 1920, the family of the future president left the area. Decades later, Frei Montalva would promote the agrarian reform process in his government, a fact that some authors relate to his childhood experience of the social situation of Chilean agriculture.

A great agricultural businessman, he owned the Lontué (home of the Lontué vineyard), Rinconada de Maipú, El Llano, Pulmodón, Entrerríos, Pirgüín and El Manzano estates(Fundos).

== Public life ==
Conservative Party activist. Deputy for Talca, Curepto and Lontue from 1906 to 1909. Member of the Industry Commission.

Director of the Association of Chilean Winegrowers (Avich)

As a local political boss and landowner, Francisco Javier Correa Errázuriz built the San Bonifacio Church between 1920 and 1926, a short distance (one block) from the train station. This religious building was named in honor of the father of its builder. Currently one of the characteristic landmarks of the locality, it is a Catholic temple of neo-gothic style with an external pulpit facing the small square located in front of the building. This external pulpit or balcony, apparently intended to harangue the peasant population gathered in front of the church, is also found in the temple of neighboring Molina.

== Death ==
Francisco Javier Correa Errázuriz died at the age of 64 in Lontué on June 14, 1934, which belonged to the Molina commune in that year. His mortal remains were transferred to Santiago, where he was buried in the mausoleum of the Correa Pereira Family on June 18, 1934
