= Portales (disambiguation) =

Portales may refer to:

== People ==
- Amanda Portales (born 1961), Peruvian artist
- Diego Portales (1793–1837), Chilean politician
- Javier Portales (1937–2003), Argentine actor
- Juan Antonio Portales (born 1996), Mexican footballer
- Suceso Portales (1904–1999), Spanish activist

== Places ==
- Portales, New Mexico, a city in the United States
- Portales Forest Reserve, in New Mexico

== Other uses ==
- Diego Portales University, a Chilean University
- Portales metro station, in Mexico City
- Portales Municipal Airport, an airport of the United States
