= Guaraculén =

- Region: Maule
- Province: Linares
- Municipalidad: Villa Alegre
- Comuna: Villa Alegre

Government
  - Type: Municipalidad
  - Alcade: Arturo Palma Vilches

Population (2002 census )
  - Total: 190
- Time zone: UTC−04:00 (Chilean Standard)
  - Summer (DST): UTC−03:00 (Chilean Daylight)
- Area code: Country + town = 56 + ?

Guaraculén was a large hacienda and hamlet, located near Villa Alegre, in the current province of Linares, in the Maule Region of Chile. Guaraculén was the birthplace of the famed Jesuit Priest, naturalist and chronicler Juan Ignacio Molina (Abate Molina), who was forced to leave Chile in 1768 when the Jesuits were expelled. Molina later settled in Bologna, Italy where he became professor of natural sciences.
