= Liolaemus molinai =

Conservation status
- Least Concern (IUCN 3.1)

Scientific classification
- Kingdom: Animalia
- Phylum: Chordata
- Class: Reptilia
- Order: Squamata
- Suborder: Iguania
- Family: Liolaemidae
- Genus: Liolaemus
- Species: L. molinai

Binomial name
- Liolaemus molinai Valladares, Etheridge, Schulte, Manriquez, & Spotorno, 2002

Species of lizard

Liolaemus molinai is a species of lizard in the family Iguanidae. It is found in Chile. The species is named in honor of Juan Ignacio Molina.
