= Miguel de Olivares =

Chilean priest and historian

Miguel de Olivares (1675–1768) was a Chilean priest and historian.

Miguel de Olivares was born at Chillán. He joined the Society of Jesus, became a missionary, and as such began about 1701 to travel through the territories of Quillota, Polpaico, Tiltil, Limache, and others. From 1712 until 1720 he directed the missions of Nahuelhuapi and Calbuco, and in 1730 he was in Concepción during the earthquake of July, which destroyed that city.

His frequent voyages gave him an opportunity to study the archives of the Company of Jesus, and about 1736, in Santiago, he began to compile his history. From 1740 till 1758 he served in the missions of Araucania, where he learned the language of the Indians. He intended to write a complete history of Chile, when a decree of Charles III exiled the Jesuits, and, notwithstanding his advanced age, Olivares had to leave the country.

In Lima, by order of the viceroy, Manuel de Amat, he was robbed of his manuscripts, and the viceroy's secretary, Jose Perfecto Salas, obtained the second part of the "Historia militar, civil y sagrada de lo acaecido en la conquista y pacificación del Reino de Chile." From Imola he tried to recover his manuscripts, and the king himself ordered the president of Chile to send them to Spain, which was done by Ambrosio O'Higgins, but Olivares died at Imola before their arrival in Madrid.

A complete edition of the work and a "Historia de la Compañía de Jesus en Chile 1593–1736," with notes by the Chilean historian Diego Barros Arana, appeared in Santiago in 1870.

== See also ==
- Juan Ignacio Molina
- Alonso de Ovalle

== Sources ==
- Figueroa, Pedro Pablo (1888). "Tercera Parte". Diccionario biográfico general de Chile: 1550–1887 (PDF) (in Spanish). Vol. III. Santiago, Chile: Imprenta "Victoria" de H. Izquierdo. p. 394.
