= Pedro Correa Ovalle =

Chilean politician

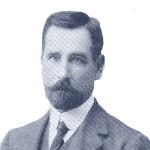

Pedro Correa Ovalle (21 June 1864 – 13 May 1945) was a Chilean politician. A member of the Conservative Party, he served in the Senate of Chile.
