= Condado de Maule =

Spanish noble title

Heraldic Crown of Spanish Count

Conde de Maule is a Spanish noble title emerged at the end of the colony in Chile, Carlos IV granted by the April 9, 1810 to Nicolás de la Cruz y Bahamonde, with prior vizcondado of Cruz house. The name of the title refers to the river, province or region of Maule, Chile.

== Succession ==
The title was reinstated on July 9, 1959 by Jorge Correa Ugarte, a member of the Sovereign Military Order of Malta, he has a relationship to the first owner of the title, that was Juan Albano Cruz. Correa Ugarte what he had until of December 10, 1986, the time his death in 1992. He was succeeded by his nephew, Juan Eduardo Correa Larraín, son of Estanislao Correa Ugarte. In April 2007 the Court. º Madrid determined that Mr. Correa Larraín has usurped that title.

By having better law, April 2, 2007, the title passes to the Chilean Juan Carlos Cruz Lindemann, by Court Order 407/2007 of the Ministry of Justice of Spain

== titles ==
- Nicolás de la Cruz y Bahamonde, I conde de Maule
- María Joaquina de la Cruz y Jiménez de Velasco, II condesa de Maule
- Joaquín de Aymerich y de la Cruz, III conde de Maule
- Jorge Correa Ugarte, IV conde de Maule (since 1959 to December 10, 1986)
- Juan Eduardo Correa Larraín, V conde de Maule (since May 18, 1992)
- Juan Carlos Cruz Lindemann, VI conde de Maule (since February 27, 2007)

== See also ==
- Juan de la Cruz y Bernardotte
- Juan Albano Pereira Márquez
