= Founding of Talca =

Founding of Talca San Agustín of Talca
- City and Commune
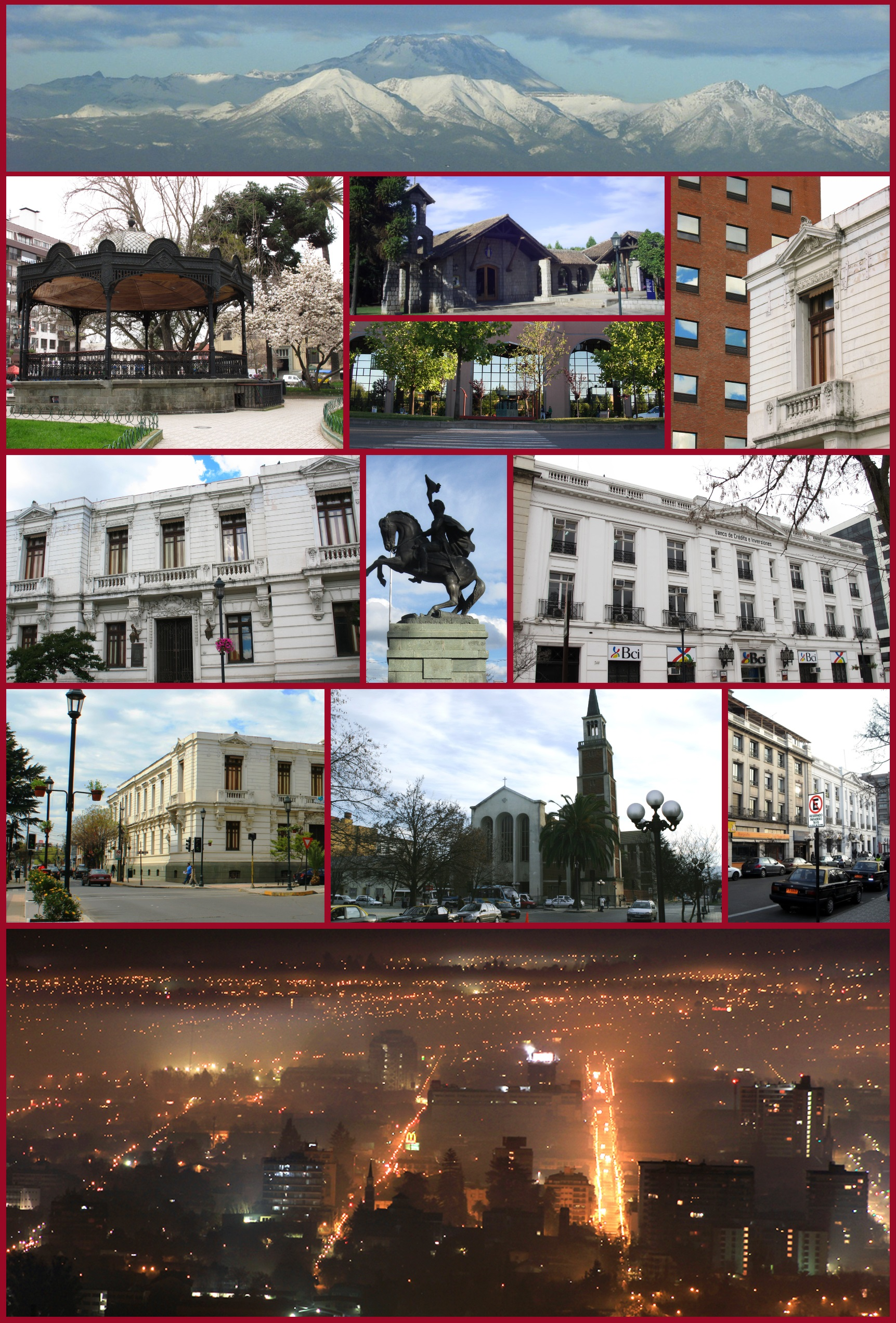
- Montage of San Agustín de Talca, capital city of Maule Region, Republic of Chile

- Coat of arms Location of Talca commune in Maule Region Location in Chile
- Coordinates: 35°26′0″S 71°40′0″W
- Region: Maule Region
- Province: Talca Province
- Established: May 12, 1742

Area
  - Total: 231.5 km^{2} (89.4 sq mi)
- Elevation: 102 m (335 ft)
- Demonym: Talquino
- Time zone: UTC−4 (CLT)
  - Summer (DST): UTC−3 (CLST)
- Postal code: 3460000
- Area code: 56 (country) + 71 (Talca Province)
- Climate: Csb

The San Agustín de Talca Foundation was on May 12, 1742, who ordered its foundation was the Royal Governor of Chile, José Antonio Manso de Velasco and later named City of Talca on June 6, 1796, a real identity document of Carlos IV of Spain, the Royal Governor of Chile, Ambrosio O'Higgins and the Corregidor of Talca, Vicente de la Cruz y Bahamonde.

== Origin ==
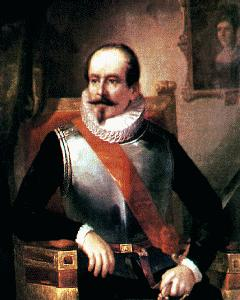
Alonso de Ribera y Zambrano

The 14-year period that separates the Curalaba disaster (December 23, 1598) and the defensive war (May 26, 1612) is the most violent that records the history of Chile and, in some way, the most momentous of the Spanish colonies In five years, the seven cities located south of the Biobío: Santa Cruz de Oñez, Arauco, Angol, La Imperial, Valdivia, Osorno and Villarrica disappeared from the Mapuche or were abandoned by the Spaniards. The extensive area designed by Pedro de Valdivia, and which had formed as the national nucleus of the new country; These Chilean lands were lost as an active element in their development for more than two centuries. Thousands of Spaniards perished in this company and more than four hundred women, Spanish and mestizo children, captured by the victors, propped up with their blood the growing vitality of the Mapuche people and the other half of the separated territory went through a long moral crisis. That came with increasing misery to test the feeling of survival.

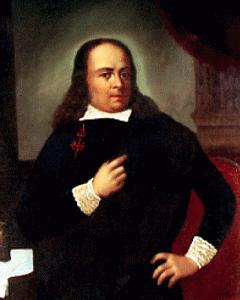
Tomás Marín González de Poveda

Of these Spanish troops under the command of Governor Alonso de Ribera (he arrived at February 11, 1601 to the Arauco War and died in Concepcion in 1617), Captain Don Gil de Vilches y Aragón served. This young man came to the Arauco war in 1598 at 17 years of age, is a native of the city of Baeza, born in 1581, was the son of Juan de Vilches y Collados and Doña María de Aragón, both with proven nobility.

The historian Don Diego de Rosales quotes him:

That, as principal assistant of the army, send field marshal Pedro Cortés, to find out the author of certain robberies made to an assistant of Arauco, in a letter published with the death penalty for the one who stole in the square, and that the author discovered, proceeded to hang up. The diligence was practiced, the accomplice denied the truth, assuming that soldier Alonso Ranquel, who has no excuses in his form, sent him to the gallows; but the Blessed Virgin Our Lady freed him from the rope and when they picked him up they found him healthy, and upon entering as a Jesuit he was a saint, in my opinion he died.

In 1609, when he was 28, he had a good situation for his services as captain, and he was awarded the following grant dated August 18, 1609, where he says:

In the place called Talcamo, on the Claro River, between the farms called Arroyo and Don Jorge; where the "Ahumada" Indians used to be, Don Gil built their houses there, to which he gave all the necessary comforts. This house had several pieces, with a main room and a chapel with rich ornaments. This house had good furniture inside and a rich silver service. In the main room his portrait was placed, which, according to documents of the time, It was placed next to that of Our Lady of the Visitation. Numerous servants, slaves and Yanaconas Indians, were in charge of housework, giving their mansion all the decorum and opulence of a successful and distinguished conqueror.

He married Mrs. Isabel de Mendoza y Valdivia, of which he had no succession, but continued his last name with natural children. He held the position of corregidor of the Maule party from 1632 to 1634. In 1641, at the age of 60, he authorized his wife to carry out tests, appointed his universal heiress and that after his days, they passed their properties to the Augustinian community, with the following condition:

That the necessary land be given for when your majesty wishes to found a city, town or place

Captain Don Gil de Vilches y Aragón is considered the first Spanish settled with all the properties in the lands of Talcamo, later called Talca. His widow Doña Isabel de Mendoza y Valdivia, in his last years of life was a nun in the convent of Las Agustinas de Santiago. On July 3, 1651, as a novice nun, the secretary appeared and ordered an Augustinian convent founded in his stay in Talca. After the general uprising of February 1655 in the Arauco War, the Spaniards sought refuge on the north bank of the Maule River, where camps and moats were built in these lands of the Order of San Agustín. This fact could be considered as the first attempt at foundation. Successive attempts of foundation were made as a refuge for the Spaniards of the Arauco War, without any results.

It is considered that the first attempt of foundation is of the governor Tomás Marín González de Poveda in 1692, at the confluence of the Baeza and Piduco rivers, where he drew streets and squares. Inadequate and agriculturally poor land, so their settlement disappeared.

== Foundation of San Agustín de Talca ==
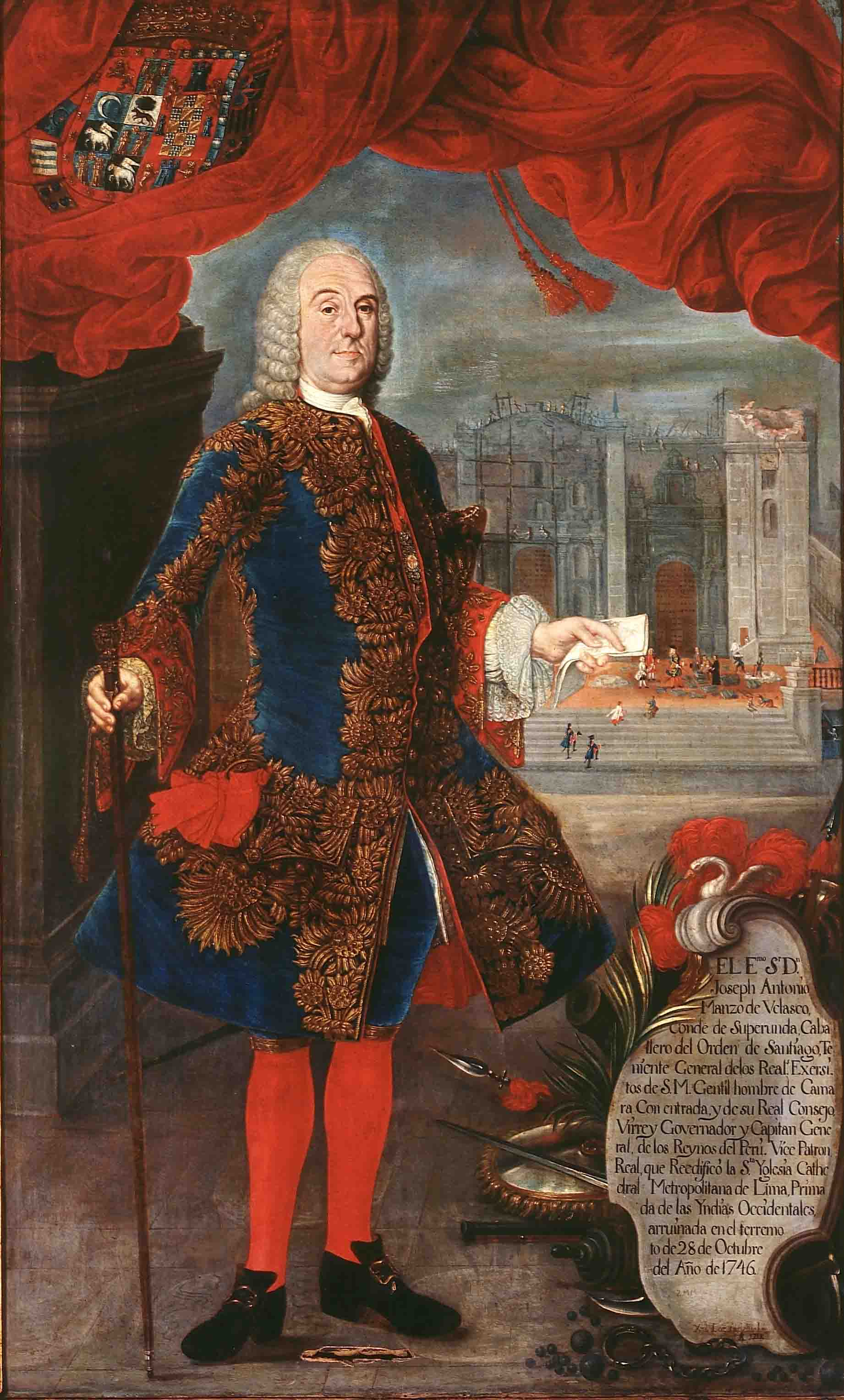
José Antonio Manso de Velasco

In the house and place that belonged to the widow Isabel de Mendoza y Valdivia, it was the center of a large part of the Maule district. The farmers of Cauquenes, Purapel, Loncomilla and Putagán, Rauquén, Huenchullami, Vichuquén, went there to their religious practices. The Augustinian Order had been installed since 1651. This formed the political and development center of the Maule party, where militias and good government gathered there.

José Antonio Manso de Velasco was instructed to found between the city of Quillota and the Biobío River, a city at the headquarters of Talcamo. This was the third time that the royal authority was going to work on this task, after the failed attempts of 1655 and 1692.

The Governor of the Kingdom José Antonio Manso de Velasco arrived in Maule on May 12, 1742, the date of his founding act.

Law of the San Agustín de Talca Foundation

Talca, May 12, 1742

In Talca, do del Maule, on twelve days of the month of May 1742 years. Mr. José Antonio Manso de Velasco, lord of the order of Santiago, of the Council of his majesty, field marshal of his royal armies, governor and captain general of this kingdom and president of his royal audience, said: as much as he has come to this place of Talca to have the population of Spaniards that it has decided to do, and that the place that has seemed more appropriate in these neighborhoods has already been chosen, to please the neighborhood and many of the settlers, and with effect it is to be in it All the good qualities that can be desired. Therefore, in accordance with the repeated orders of his majesty and for giving in his royal service, the luster of this kingdom, the general utility and the spiritual and temporal good of the growing number of inhabitants that exist in this feast; He agreed that in the chosen place, which is located in the southern part of the convent of Mr. San Agustín at a distance of four blocks, the population of Spaniards with a formal neighborhood merges and stops, and of course putting the name of their majesty (may God keep) the erije and found more honor and glory of God Our Lord with the name of San Agustín de Talca, who must be its owner; and grants to all the settlers who in that population approached with home and formal neighborhood, all the privileged and frank freedoms and immunities that by law and laws of the kingdom should enjoy as such settlers, and grant them merits of some lands of those that would have Cows in this game of this band of the Maule River, which will run after they are populated and consist of the vacant land. And I reserve to extend these subsidies and franknesses to the proportion of their faculties, and to erect the population in a town or city according to the state that it has in future and what grows and the application that in its advancement is recognized in The neighborhood and the settlers.; At that time, he makes sure to make his majesty the consultations offered to grant them greater privileges. And I order the commission conferred on the corregidor of this party that runs in the car of the seventeenth of January to delineate the population with the usual square, streets and other competent footprints, both in its latitude and in its longitude, putting everything in good willingness, as it is for a population that is expected to increase according to the fervor that is recognized in the neighborhood and its need and fertility and abundance of the place, and distribute lots to those who have to populate, so it reproduces the power granted. And I order that by virtue of that, the mentioned corregidor Don Juan Cornelio de Baeza proceed to make the delineation leaving competent lands for ejidos and pastures, and in the contour of the population some lots not distributed for his. And setting reference points and fixed limits so that at all times it is about the lands that belong to said population; and assign the lots to the inhabitants according to the sphere, the merit and the quality of each one, their family and state; giving effective measures to build all their houses as soon as possible and assigning them a certain term; with warning of declining mercy and incurring the penalties that the king imposes for his true identity card to those who refuse to live in sociability and in the city without having a justified excuse. And that because they could offer to said corregidor some precise occupations of his trade that for some times embarrass him the attention to the greater advance of the population; so that it does not stop under any pretext, he appointed as a commissioner of her, in absence, diseases and precise pregnancies of the corregidor to Don Mauricio Morales, with the same faculties; and one and the other by their order will exercise, giving each of the villagers an instrument that serves as the title of the lot assigned to them, putting in the conditions contained in the instruction. And then he provided, ordered and signed his honor, that I give faith to this common role for lack of sealing. Don José Manso Lord last Manuel Lumbier, public notary of Cabildo and government actuary.

This place should be the center of the new foundation, its main square, where its streets would be.

== Final settlement in the villa ==
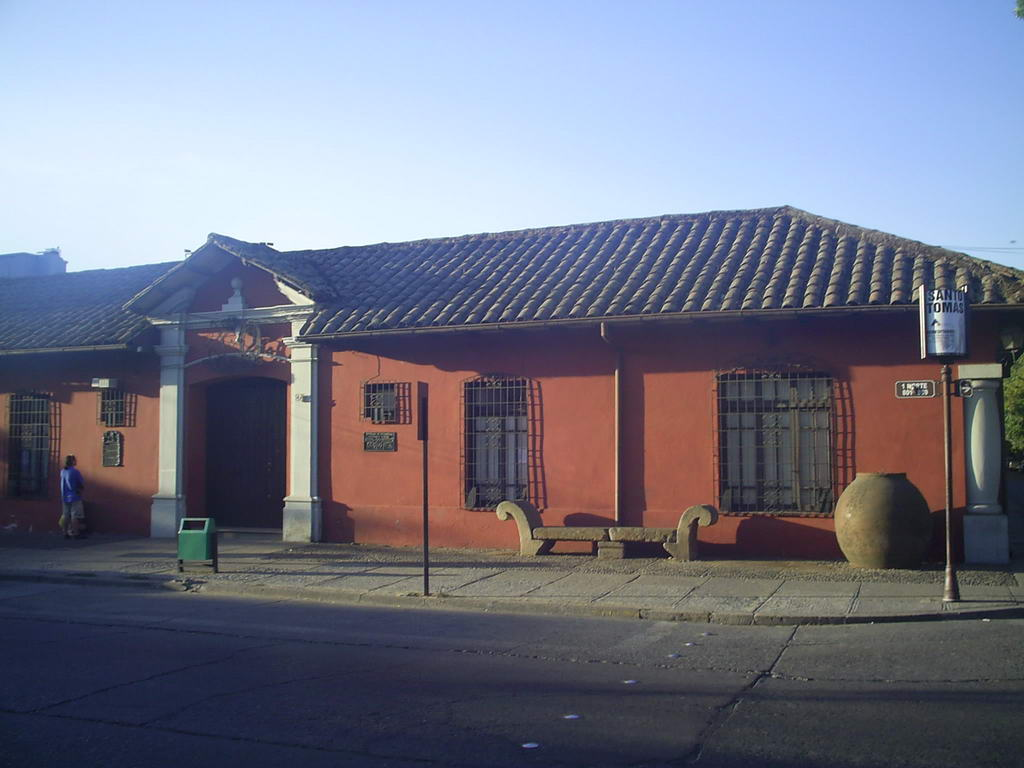
House of Juan Albano Pereira Márquez, where he grew up and studied Bernardo O'Higgins.

Governor Manso de Velasco appointed Mr. Mauricio de Morales as an advisor to the corrector of Baeza, with the power to replace him. The governor gave Baeza the instructions that he should stick to the new foundation, these were:

Donate the lots in proportion "to the sphere, the merits and the families" of each resident and that their location be given so that the most distinguished are closer to the square. "That they build their houses under penalty of losing their places," he added, and "that the priest transfers the parish church to the new population" and the party secretary should do the same.

In October 1743, Manso de Velasco returned to Talca to inspect the work of the new population. He observed his prosperous state, his streets well delineated, although poor houses, since the landowners had not done theirs. This performance of the rich neighbors had a reason. The landowners, considering themselves noble, when descending from the conquerors, having lands and Indians, were reluctant to make their homes, because the fact of coming to a city placed them in the same condition as the commoners, who also acquired the status of noble by be the first founders of a city.

This attitude led Governor Manso de Velasco to dictate in Talca, on October 12, 1743, a side on which serious fines were applied to those who would not come. These measures had a fast and favorable result. Since the end of 1743, they began to approach their directors and also saw their quality guaranteed by the so-called "Constitutions of the Villa de Talca".

These were the provisions contained in the dictation of May 29, 1743, issued in accordance with the Royal Decree of April 5, 1744. This document was delivered to the Cabildo and rigorously preserved by him.

In these Constitutions the status of the nobles, the neighbors and those who were not were regulated, and their rights and prerogatives were fixed. They said the neighbors would have free trade in their assets. “Landowners who can afford the privilege. Those who enjoy it, their children and descendants, only by condition that they contribute to public works. They were exempt from the obligation, the neighbors did all kinds of personal services, such as military, judicial, prisoners and couriers, to which they were obliged as mere neighbors. These landowners should only go in defense of the kingdom and the ordinances of a good government. Traded merchants, only they could sell in the nascent Villa. Those who established grocery stores would not pay real rights for ten years. They were authorized for three days, and three times a year, to hold fairs, free of the true right. Only the villagers could be lobbyists. These provisions left the neighborhood happy to have seen their privileges protected and without the burdens of war.

The material advance had advanced rapidly from the inauguration of the defense of the Kingdom and the ordinances of May 12, 1742, until this date of the year 1745. The Corregidor Baeza had dedicated a lot of activity: he published the orders, notified the neighbors and told them that promised them honors and privileges. I order the priest and the employee. Thus, on April 18, 1744, he was able to make the first general registry of the nascent city and direct a relationship of his state with Governor Manso de Velasco and said:

Which was formed by four blocks in a contour one for each side and following the instructions six streets were delineated, all square, each one in its latitude, it consists up to the present of six blocks, all well arranged so that the lots are distributed to the neighbors "and" that has four wooden bridges to pass the estuary. "

The plots of the Plaza, the main ones according to Baeza's relationship, were distributed as follows:

1. Plot of the church of Matriz, one block from the Plaza. There he built in 1744 his house, the first priest of Talca, Don Antonio de Molina y Cabello, and in the southern part of the site, in the place of the Church, says Baeza, he has placed "the Elders of heaven and earth, put a big cross and bell tower.

2. On the second side, half a block from the Plaza, half of the plot. The house of Don Cornelio de Baeza.

3. Solar, on the second side, half a block from the Plaza, half of the lot, adjacent to the previous one, house of Commissioner Don Francisco de Silva Borque.

4. Solar, third side, square through the middle block before the square. Houses of Commissioner Juan de Sepúlveda.

5. Solar, third side, next to the previous one. Houses of Captain Manuel de Toledo.

6. Solar, fourth side, all its front for house of the town hall of Corregidor and Jail.

After this distribution, Juan Cornelio de Baeza continues, listing the other neighbors, without expressing their proximity or location within the plan of the new city. Their number reaches eighty-three, including all, whether noble or commoners, landowners or masters in minor arts, to the Indian executioner, Juan.

This small population of 83 families, which had been grouped around the Plaza Mayor, site of the Perales, four blocks from the Agustino convent, that is, "site and houses inhabited by Gil de Vilches y Aragón", formed a population, mainly composed of landowners and poor neighbors. The landowners of the north and south of the Maule brought their families and built their houses. Thus, we see in this primitive group of families, the Silva, Sepúlveda, Martínez de Vergara, de la Fuente, Besoain, Nieto de Silva, Rojas Vilches, Molina, Aguirre, de la Torre, Aliaga, Henríquez, Verdugo, Olave, Velasco, Oróstegui, Albuerna, Arellano, Olivares, Toledo and Morales.

The number of neighbors was increasing. Faced with such a good result, Manso de Velasco thought of giving him a Cabildo of his own, by virtue of the powers conferred on them by the royal bonds, a determination that would attract more the well-off neighbors and force them to settle in the nascent village, where the honors and prerogatives they could raise them "to the noble state" constant concern of that time.

By decree of December 9, 1744, Manso de Velasco appointed the first Cabildo of the city of San Agustín de Talca, with functions for the entire year of 1745. The members of this first cabildo were: Francisco de Silva, for the position of Ordinary. Mayor of first vote; José de Aguirre for mayor of second vote; to José Joaquín de Oróstegui, by Ensign Royal, and councilors Mr. José Besoain and Mr. José Hilarío de Velasco; Provincial Mayor of Bernardo de Azocar Hurtado de Mendoza and San Martín. All were rich landowners and neighbors of the town.

The new population continued with its growth and material progress, new families and new public and private buildings were still arriving. On March 8, 1745, the corregidor Baeza returned to report on the state of the city, a report in which he says: 124 families live, of which 100 live in their homes; 24 with lots, of these 14 cemented and 10 with possession. In the same report, he adds, that the city has four bridges, two churches and the jail building under construction, since its walls are in a state of completion. The two churches were the Augustinian convent and the parish church, built by the priest Antonio de Molina y Cabello. On September 12, 1746, the priest Molina received from the neighbors the sum of 15,000 pesos. In 1750 the Franciscans began to build a chapel.

From 1742 to 1760 more families were registered. In the census conducted by the corregidor Francisco de Echague, on October 16, 1760, the town presents 143 families, 20 were new, among which we can write Cruz, Vergara, Opazo, Gajardo Guerrero and Bravo Denaveda.

== The Augustinian Order ==
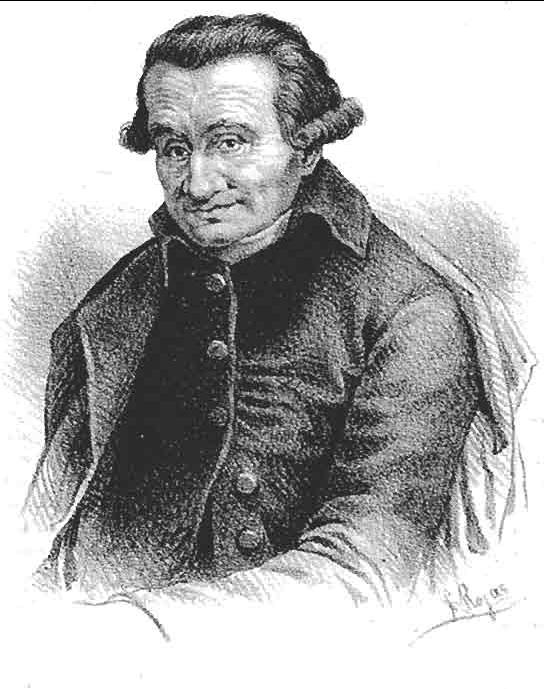
Portrait of Juan Ignacio Molina

The economic improvement, produced mainly by foreign trade, aroused the ambition of the Order, which saw its poor lands, converted into fertile and productive hands of working colonists. The Order planned to recover the lands and for this they made a plan. The residents of the convent of Talca, met on November 5, 1744, under the presidency of R. P. Lorenzo Guerrero, superior of the convent; of the brilliant reader R. P., Fray Luis Caldera, former provincial of the Province; and RR. PP José Solís, Alonso Soto, Justo Vélez, etc. The provincial of the Order said that although the donation had been made without establishing the number of blocks and without consulting the convent, they now came to express the number of blocks donated. They agreed to give only "six blocks on each side of the square. The officers of the order subsequently met without finding any accusation against the neighboring landowners.

In 1749, he came to take charge of the Order, Fray Nicolás Gajardo Guerrero, of a strong and reckless character. With the agreement of his convent, he learned that his brothers had not enforced their rights. Unable to contain himself, he rode a horse and headed to neighboring farms to destroy his fields and works. He attacked the weak incredibly. The neighbors suffered their threats and had to suffer many men who feared to defend themselves. At first, he tried to charge them the rent of the occupied lands and when the villagers resisted, he attacked them. The attitude of the Cabildo put an end to these activities of the Order. The Augustinians had had their supremacy for a century and a half, from the arrival of Gil de Aragón until the date of the founding of Talca.

== Company of Jesus in the Villa ==
Governor Manso de Velasco gave all the facilities to the new order of the Jesuits to settle throughout the kingdom of Chile. In Talca, donations of land for their respective settlement. The decree of June 10, 1748, which authorized its establishment, imposed on them the obligation to found schools. The Order was very well received and its first superior, Fray José Guzmán. Thus they made rich lands that exceeded 1,000 (cuadras) blocks of extension.

The establishment was supported by local figures, including Genoese merchant Juan de la Cruz y Bernardotte, his wife Silveria Bahamonde y Herrera, and Francisca González Bruna, widow of Agustín de Molina y Narveja. González Bruna's son, naturalist and historian Juan Ignacio Molina, subsequently entered the Jesuit order.

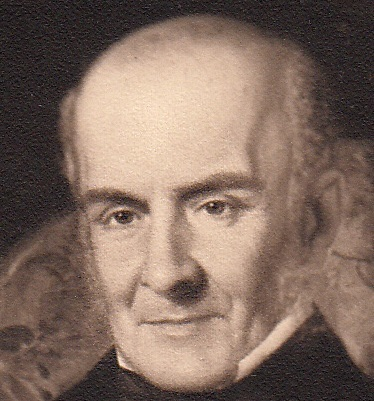
Portrait of Pedro Nolasco Vergara Albano (1800 - 1867)

They built their church, whose work was helped by Juan de la Cruz y Bernardotte, who had some knowledge of architecture, and had arrived in the new city brought from Concepción by Governor Manso de Velasco, who found him among the crew of the squadron of El Admiral Pizarro, to teach Talca's neighbors how to build their houses. The Genoese helped with 500 pesos for the expenses and with architectural works to the Jesuits. The order had to suffer the misfortune of seeing the recent construction surrounded by the flames, but indefatigable and encouraged by the cooperation of the Genoese, they raised it again, more splendid, full of images and with rich ornamentation

The children of the richest neighbors were educated in this first school, they were called the College of Nobles, for the quality of the students. The children of his protectors, Juan, Vicente, Juan Manuel, Anselmo and Isidoro Cruz y Bahamonde, were his first students, and the brothers José Antonio and Juan Ignacio Molina, the famous naturalist and historian, also studied there.

There the future Abate Molina received his first lessons from these religious. As he was of a privileged intelligence, he could soon, at an early age, with the authorization of his teachers, also teach the first letters. He had a group of students among whom were Don Vicente de la Cruz y Bahamonde, his brothers Faustino, Jacinto, Juan Esteban, Juan Manuel, Ignacio, Anselmo de la Cruz y Bahamonde, Juan and Nicolás, Bernardo O'Higgins, Ignacio and Dionisio. Brisio de Opazo y Castro, Francisco Olivares y Rojas, Ramón Ramírez, Pedro Nolasco Vergara Albano, Juan Diego, Casimiro, Nicolás and Carlos Manuel Albano Cruz. All these young people received lessons, from the age of seven. After the expulsion of the Jesuits from the Kingdom and, therefore, from Talca, education was in charge of the Cabildo, which paid a master of first letters 150 pesos annually.

On April 8, 1793, this corporation agreed to lease a house for a seminar where to educate young people. This establishment had been running for years, since Don Ambrosio O'Higgins, who visited Talca in that year, says that in them, he taught the first letters and Latinity, where young people attend.

== Royal cedula of his majesty the king of Spain, who grants the title of the city ==
Don Carlos IV, on behalf of June 14, 1794, accompanied by a testimony, said that the president of the Royal Auxiliary of Chile, Don Ambrosio O'Higgins, so hereafter referred to the Villa of San Agustín de Talca mentioned above, can be called City, being placed in all the Letters, Provisions and Privileges issued by this king and by my successors. Given in Aranjuez on June 6, 1796. City title of the Villa of San Agustín de Talca in the district of the Kingdom of Chile.

Juan Manuel de la Cruz y Bahamonde were responsible for bringing and making known the Royal Decree of June 6, 1796, which states in their letter:

Lord eximio

Don Juan Manuel de la Cruz, Captain of the Cavalry of the Prince's Regiment, with my greatest performance I suffer before V. Exelencia and I say: after many clean and expensive procedures to justify the state of the population, its quality, goods and other territorial proportions of the Villa of San Agustín de Talca, in an attempt to reach the Sovereign Thank you in Honorific Title of City, which my brothers and I desire for our country, we have deserved in summary, that the King Our Lord, may God keep, with dignity Send the Title of the City, corresponding to the Villa mentioned above, since it consists of your real identification date of Aranjuez on the sixth day of last June that you duly submitted: in whose attention to V. Excellence I ask and I pray that it has been Presented with dignity this Royal Decree, it is useful to send a reason, denounce it and comply accordingly, which is Justice.

Juan Manuel de la Cruz

Santiago, November 21, 1796

View of the Fiscal Minister with the Royal Title presented

== See also ==
- Talca
- Corregimiento de Maule
- Arauco War
- Chilean Declaration of Independence
- Independence of Chile
- Juan Albano Pereira Márquez Portuguese merchant
- Juan Martínez de Vergara Basque army captain
- Juan Ignacio Molina
- José Ignacio Cienfuegos
- Cruz Family
- Vergara family
