= Diego Vergara Correa =

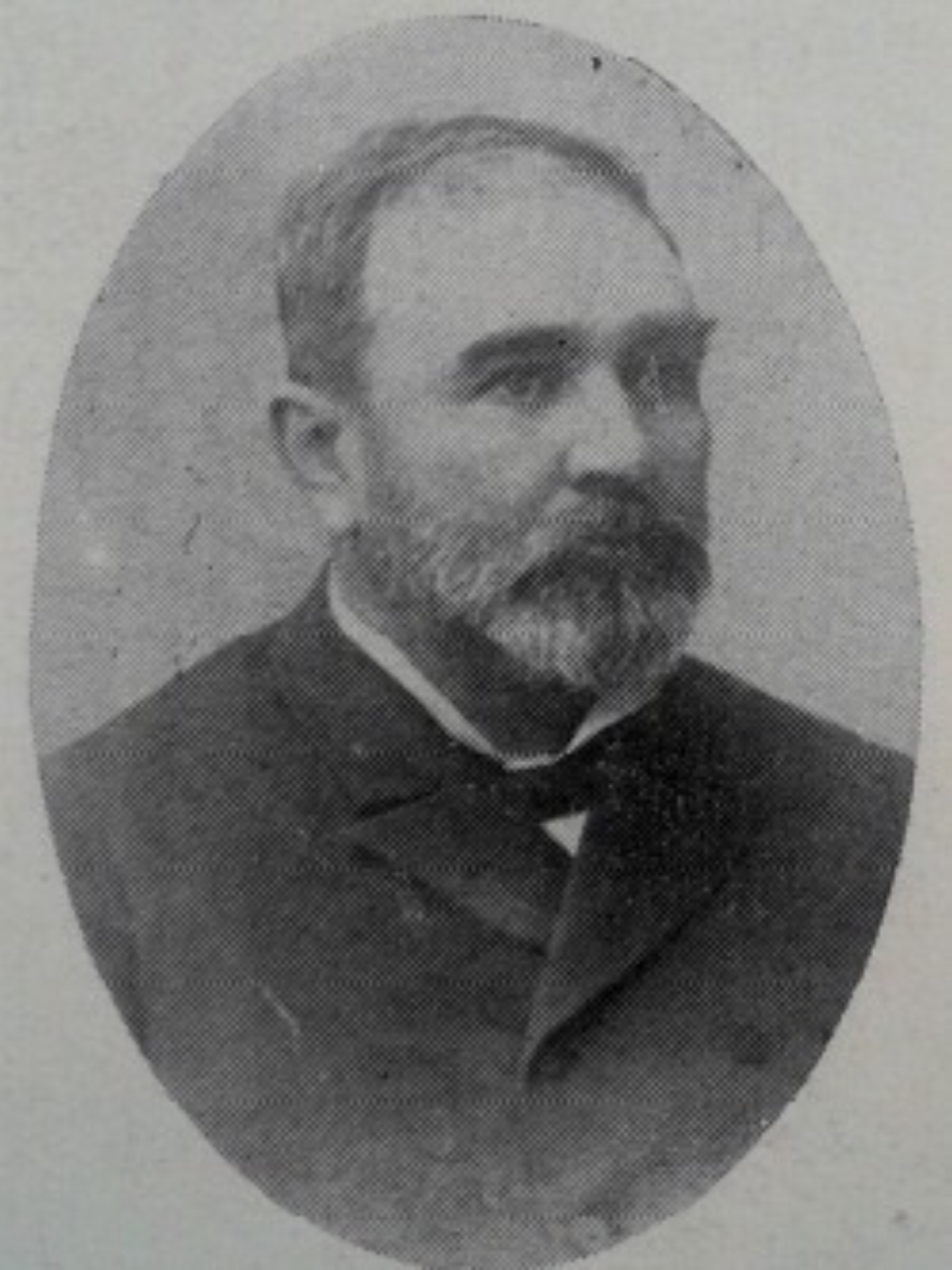
Diego Vergara Correa

Diego Segundo de las Mercedes Vergara Correa (Talca, December 31, 1839 - Santiago, November 4, 1891) was a Chilean deputy and landowner.

== Family ==
He was the son of Diego Vergara Albano and Jesús Correa Albano, and brother of the parliamentarian José Bonifacio Vergara Correa. He married Concepción Astaburuaga Vargas in Talca on October 20, 1872, daughter of Felipe Santiago Astaburuaga Cienfuegos and Natalia Vargas Rencoret, with whom he had nine children: Laura, María Ester, Diego, Felipe Eugenio, Concepción, Ludmila, Enrique, Felipe and José Luis.

== Studies ==
He studied at the University of Chile, where he graduated as a geographic engineer on April 22, 1863. He dedicated himself to his profession and his own agricultural activities, mainly on the hacienda of his property, "Las Lomas de Talca".

== Political life ==
Between 1861 and 1864, he was deputy for the Department of Linares. He held the position of second mayor of Talca between 1868 and 1873 and first secretary of Talca from 1879 to 1882.

During the Civil War, he participated in the battles of Concón and Placilla as inspector of delegations of the Balmacedista Army Administration.

He was elected deputy for Talca, Curepto and Lontué for the period 1891 - 1894; however, he died before joining the Chamber of Deputies, being replaced by Pedro Donoso Vergara.
