= Pedro Nolasco Vergara Albano =

Chilean governor (1800–1867)

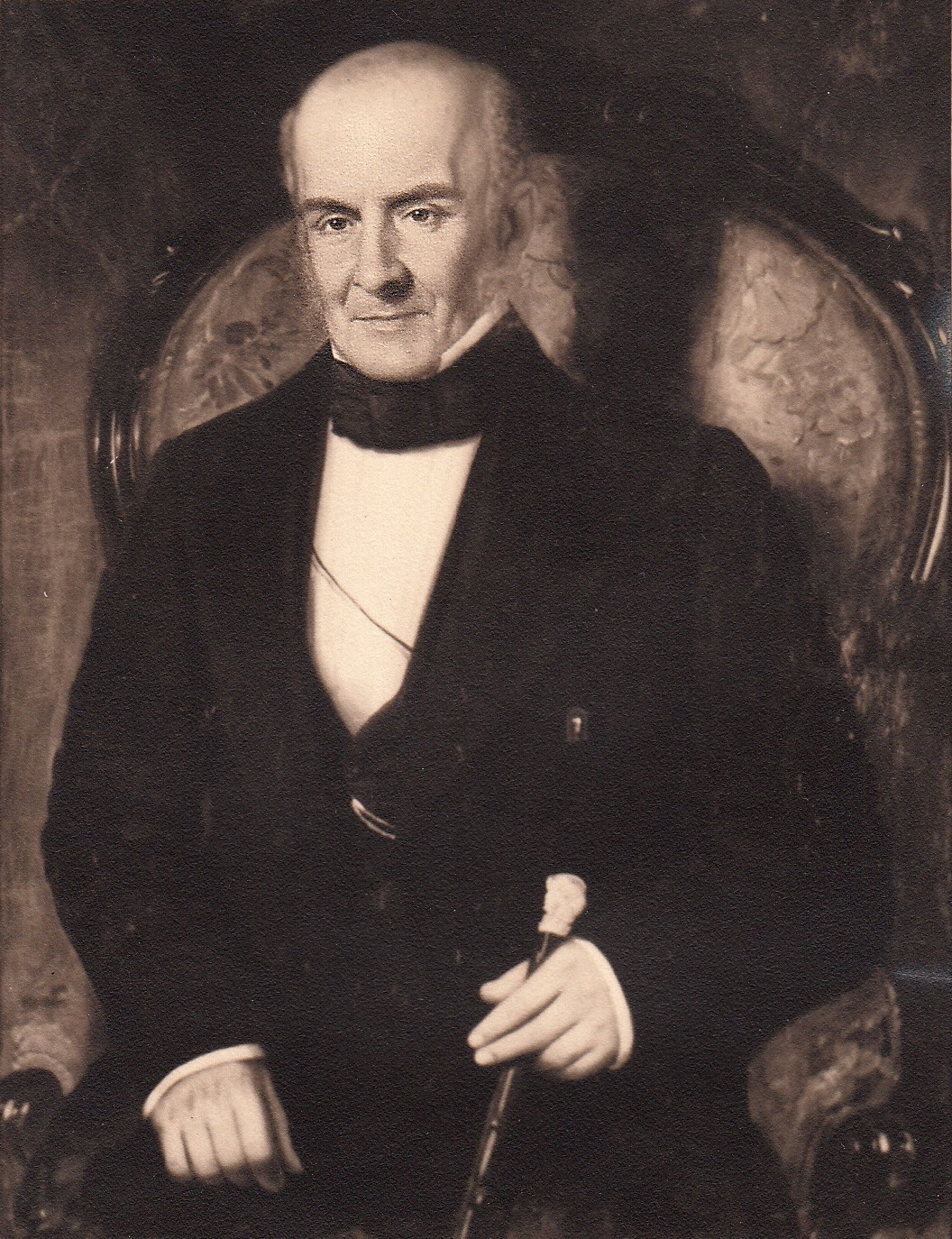

Deputy of the Chamber of Deputies of Chile for the Talca and Colchagua provinces
- In office 1822–1830

Governor of Talca Department
- In office 1830–1833

Deputy of the Chamber of Deputies of Chile for the Talca Province
- In office 1833–1847

Personal details
- Born: 1800 Talca
- Died: September 23, 1867 (aged 66–67) Santiago of Chile
- Party: Portaliano
- Spouse: Mercedes Loys y Vergara
- Children: Elisa, Natalia, Víctor, María, Agustina, Soledad, Matilde, Rafael, Pedro, Sabina y Filomena.
- Education: University of San Felipe
- Occupation: Politics
- Profession: Lawyer

Pedro Nolasco Vergara Albano also known as Pedro Nolasco Martínez de Vergara Albano (Talca, 1800 – Santiago, September 23, 1867) was a Chilean deputy, governor and farmer.

== Family ==
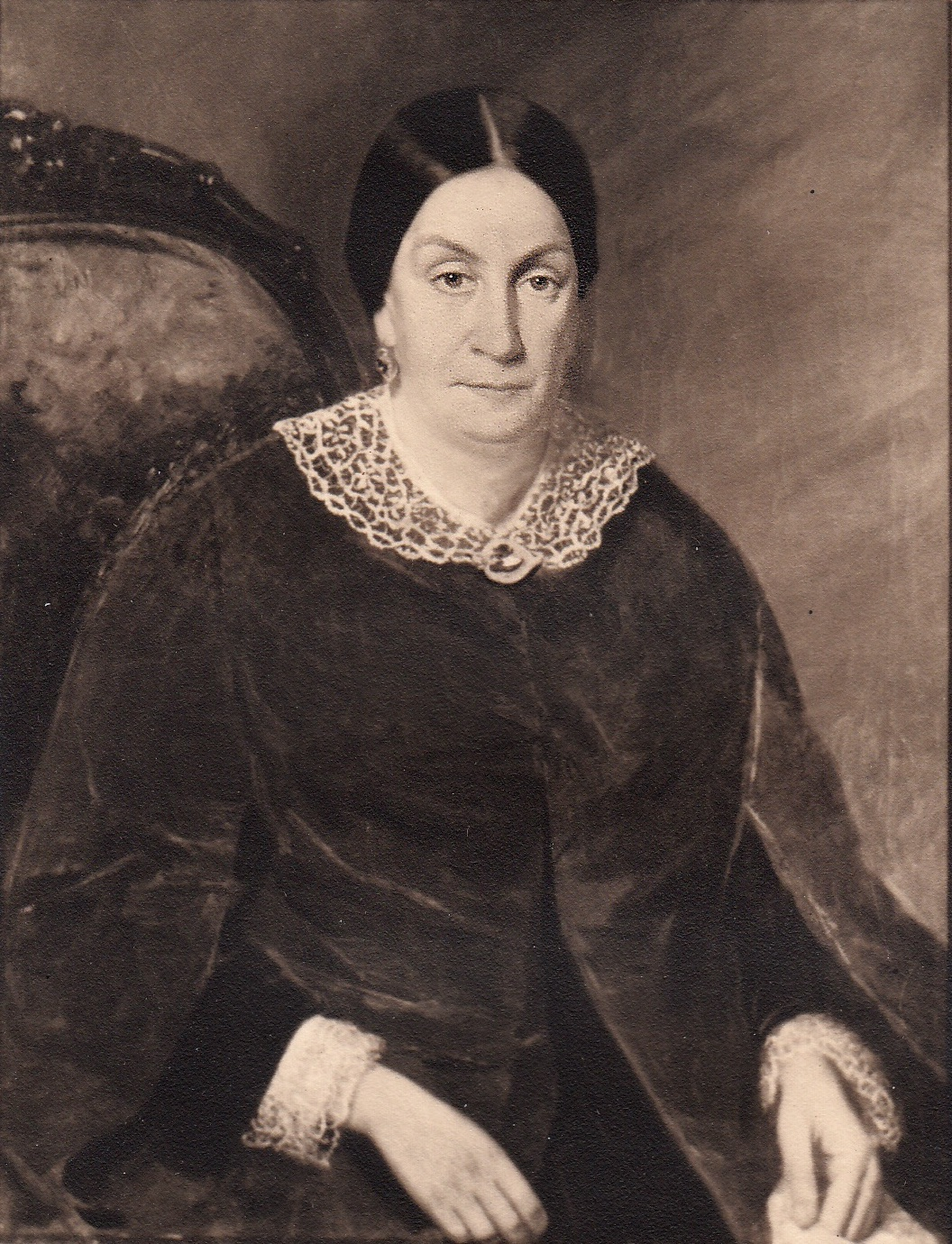
His wife Mercedes Lois Vergara

His parents were José Francisco Martínez de Vergara y Rojas-Puebla and María del Rosario Albano de la Cruz, while she was also the daughter of Juan Albano Pereira Márquez and Bartolina de la Cruz y Bahamonde. He married her cousin Mercedes Loys Vergara, with whom he had eleven children: Elisa, Natalia, Víctor, Maria, Agustina, Soledad, Matilde, Rafael, Pedro, Sabina and Filomena. He was nephew of Vicente, Juan Manuel, Anselmo and Nicolas de la Cruz y Bahamonde -who was Conde de Maule-, and cousin of Diego Vergara Albano, Juan Albano de la Cruz and Casimiro Albano de la Cruz.

Pedro Nolasco Vergara Albano was imprisoned during the Reconquest along with 40 other patriots in Juan Fernández Island and forgiven on November 26 of 1816.

== Studies ==
He completed his primary and secondary education in Talca, under the tutelage of the Jesuits. Afterwards, on his higher education, he got a degree in Law, in 1822, at the Universidad de San Felipe.

== Public life ==
=== Deputy ===
He was elected deputy for the province of Colchagua in 1823, being reelected in 1824, in Talca, and later in the period 1827–1830, in the province of Talca. He was elected deputy between 1833 and 1836, and was again re-elected on the same district until 1847. He was a renowned politician and worked as a deputy until 1847. He participated in many legislative committees, and after losing his sight, he subsequently retired to a private life in 1859, living in Santiago, in Huérfanos street. Being blind, he was prevented from exercising any public activity at the time.

=== Governor ===
He was governor of Talca between 1830 and 1833, in the rising of the ideas of Diego Portales and the triumph of Pelucones, and their conservative ideas, over Pipiolos.

== Personal life ==
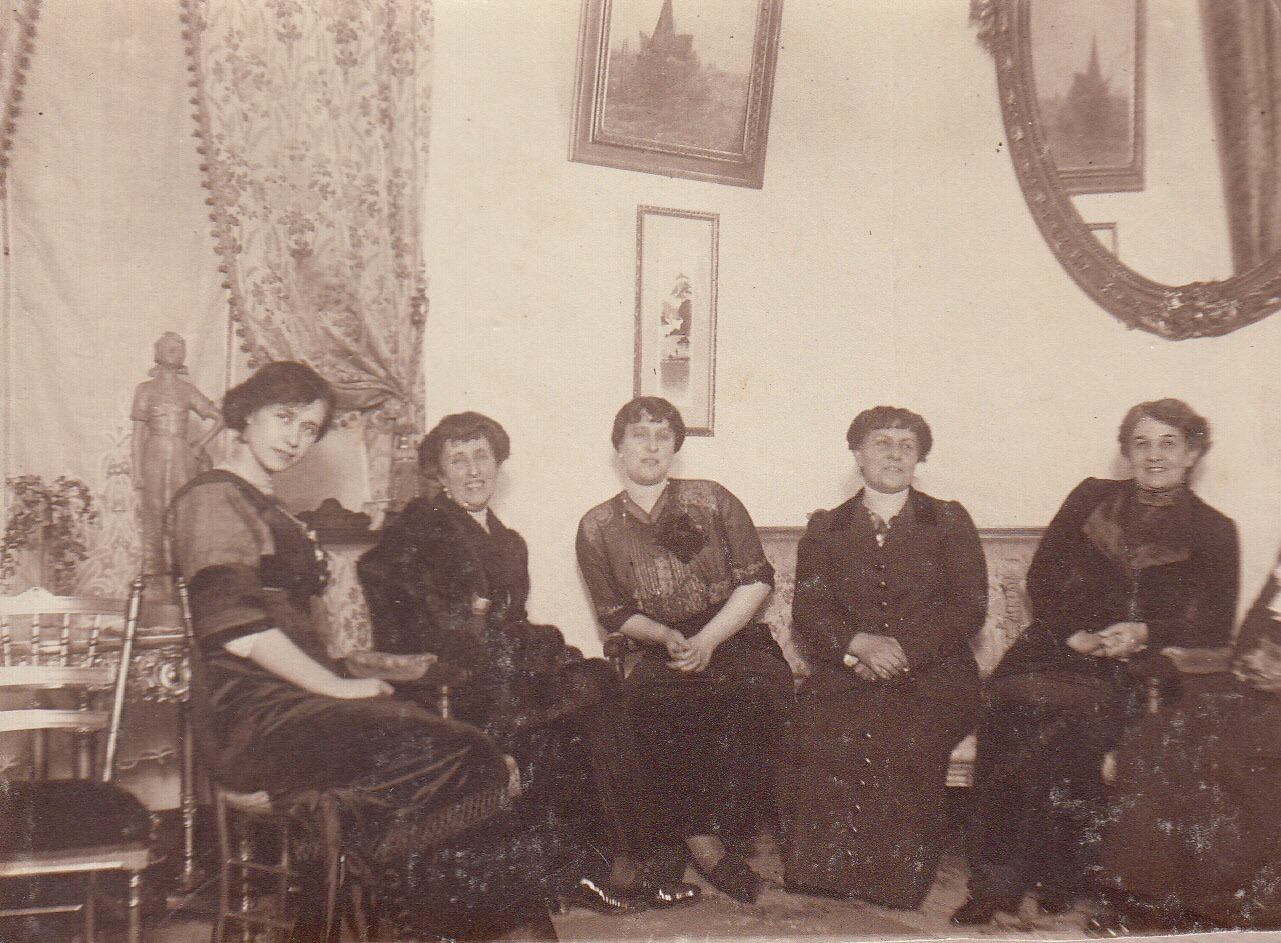
His granddaughter Correa Vergara

Pedro Nolasco Vergara Albano was an estanquero, also referred to as los de Portales, a conservative Chilean political group, that organized around the figure of Diego Portales, and a key actor in implementing this group in Talca. He was also a farmer, one of the major landowners of the province, owning the following irrigated fields: Estate Los Libros, of 197 blocks (330.96 hectare); estate Las Doscientas, with 870 blocks (1461.60 hectares), and estate Libún, of 606 blocks (1018.08 hectares), and large portions of fincas in the precordillera. He also had over 34,000 head of cattle. After he became blind in 1859, he trusted the management of his farm business to his son in law Vicente Correa Albano.

== Death ==
After arriving to Santiago in 1859, he makes his will on May 9, of 1865. He was found dead in his home on September 23, of 1867 and was buried in the mausoleum of Juan Garin Cereceda, who was married with his daughter Soledad Vergara Loys. His fortune was estimated at over 120,000 at the time of his death.
