= Wilhelm Heering =

German botanist (1876–1916)

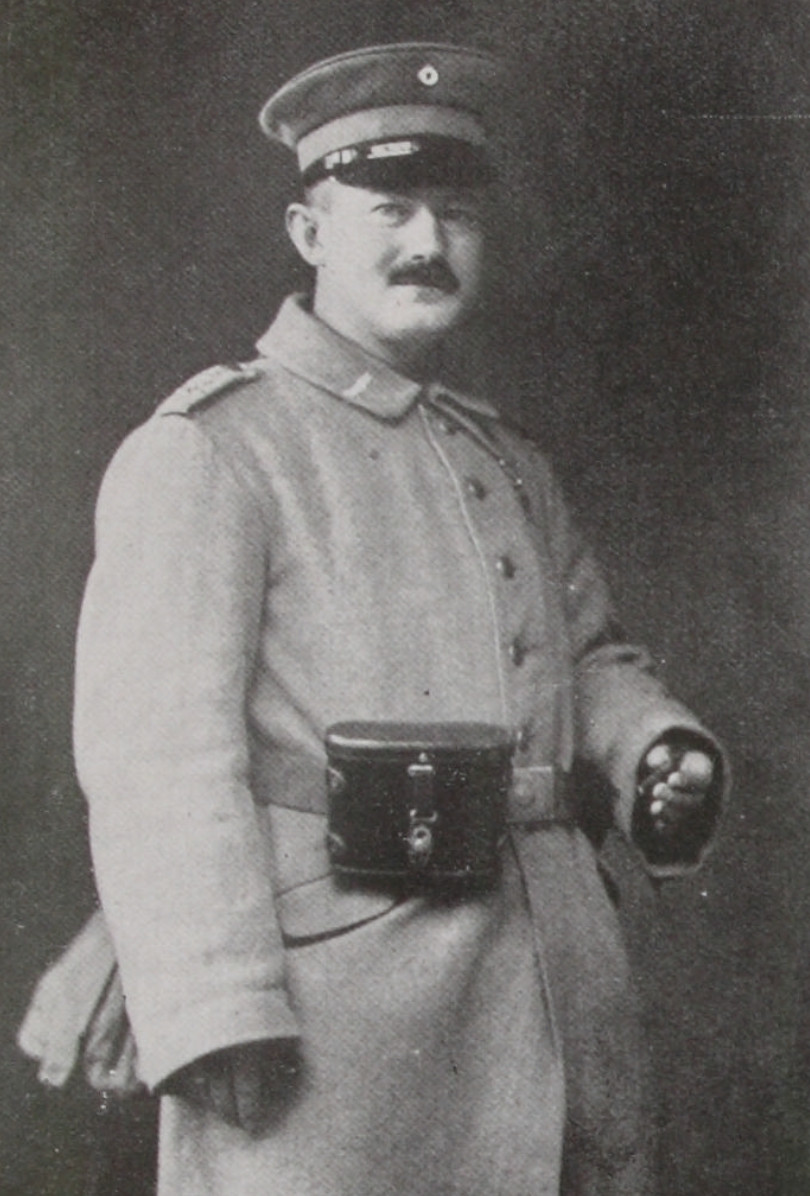
Image of Wilhelm Heering

Wilhelm Christian August Heering (6 September 1876, Altona – 26 May 1916, Verdun) was a German botanist.

He studied natural sciences at the Ludwig-Maximilians-Universität München, the University of Halle, and Kiel University, receiving his doctorate in 1899. While a student, he began expansion of a herbarium that was formerly maintained by apothecary Johann Jacob Meyer from 1812 to 1834. The herbarium is now kept at the botanical institute of the University of Hamburg.

Beginning in 1899, he focused on studies of freshwater algae, providing information on a wide variety of algae found in the Eppendorfer Moor. In 1902, he began teaching classes at a secondary school in Ottensen, and in 1909 became associated with the Schleswig-Holstein provincial office for nature conservation. From 1911, he worked as a research assistant at the Botanical State Institute in Hamburg, during which time he also conducted lectures at the Colonial Institute. While serving as a deputy officer in World War I, he died on the Western Front in May 1916.

As a taxonomist, he circumscribed numerous species within the botanical genus Baccharis.

== Selected works ==
- Die Algen des Eppendorfer Moores bei Hamburg, 1904 – Algae of the Eppendorfer Moor near Hamburg.
- Bäume und Wälder Schleswig-Holsteins. Ein Beitrag zur Natur-und Kulturgeschichte der Provinz, 1906 – Trees and forests in Schleswig-Holstein: A contribution to the natural and cultural history of the province.
- Die Süsswasseralgen Schleswig-Holsteins und der angrenzenden Gebiete der Freien und Hansestädte Hamburg und Lübeck, etc. – The freshwater algae of Schleswig-Holstein and the neighboring areas of the Free and Hanseatic cities of Hamburg and Lübeck.
- Untersuchungen über die Weideverhältnisse in Deutsch-Südwestafrika : (Futterpflanzen und Bodenproben), 1911; with Clemens Grimme – Studies on pasture conditions in German Southwest Africa: fodder plants and soil samples.
- Die Futterpflanzen Deutsch-Südwestafrikas und Analysen von Bodenproben, 1914; with Clemens Grimme – Forage plants of German Southwest Africa and analysis of soil samples: botanical and chemical analyses.
- Systematische und pflanzengeographische Studien über die Baccharis-Arten des aussertropischen Südamerikas, 1915 – Systematic and phytogeographical studies of Baccharis-types from tropical South America.

Also, he made contributions involving the green algae class Chlorophyceae to the series Die süsswasser-flora Deutschlands, Österreichs und der Schweiz.
