= Portales =

In Mexico, portales (Spanish for "portals") refers to an arcaded building that serves as a commercial complex. These are usually in rural towns and are located in the town's centre. The town plaza and iglesia are sometimes situated near portales. These buildings were also built in haciendas and they served as the servants quarters.
