= History of Pichilemu =

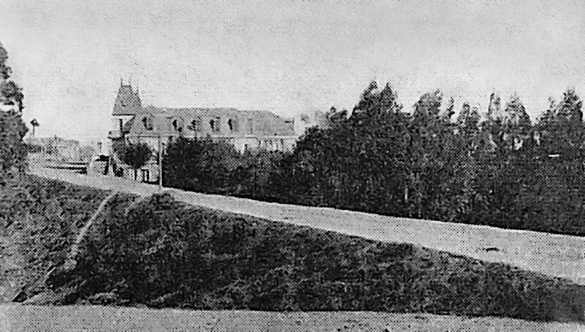
Pichilemu's Agustín Ross Casino, in 1935. Agustín Ross also constructed a hotel, a balcony and a park.

The history of Pichilemu began around the 16th century, when Promaucaes inhabited the modern Pichilemu region. According to Chilean historiographer José Toribio Medina on his book Los Restos Indígenas de Pichilemu (1908), Spanish conqueror Pedro de Valdivia gave Topocalma encomienda, in which Pichilemu was supposed to be, to Juan Gómez de Almagro, on January 24, 1544.

The name Pichilemu comes from the Mapudungún words pichi, little, and lemu, forest. Petrel, also known as San Antonio de Petrel, was a hacienda located 18 kilometers east of Pichilemu, is known for being the birthplace of José María Caro Rodríguez. The Ortúzar Cuevas family, that owned Petrel hacienda, constructed a dock in 1887 that was burnt amidst the 1891 Chilean Civil War. It was later reconstructed, but finally destroyed in 1911. They constructed additionally the first neighborhood in the currently named Daniel Ortúzar Avenue. The city of Pichilemu was officially established on December 22, 1891, by decree of President Jorge Montt and his Interior Minister, Manuel José Irarrázabal.

Agustín Ross, a Chilean writer and politician, constructed the Agustín Ross Hotel, a casino, now Agustín Ross Cultural Centre, the Agustín Ross Balcony and the Agustín Ross Park, in addition to several perrons. A 119 kilometres (74 mi) railway section between San Fernando and Pichilemu section over a period of 57 years between 1869 and 1926. The Pichilemu railway station was inaugurated that year.

Cardenal Caro Province was created by decree of President Augusto Pinochet on September 24, 1979, named in memoriam and in homage to the first Cardinal of the Chilean Catholic Church, José María Caro Rodríguez. Pichilemu is the capital of the province.

== Early history ==
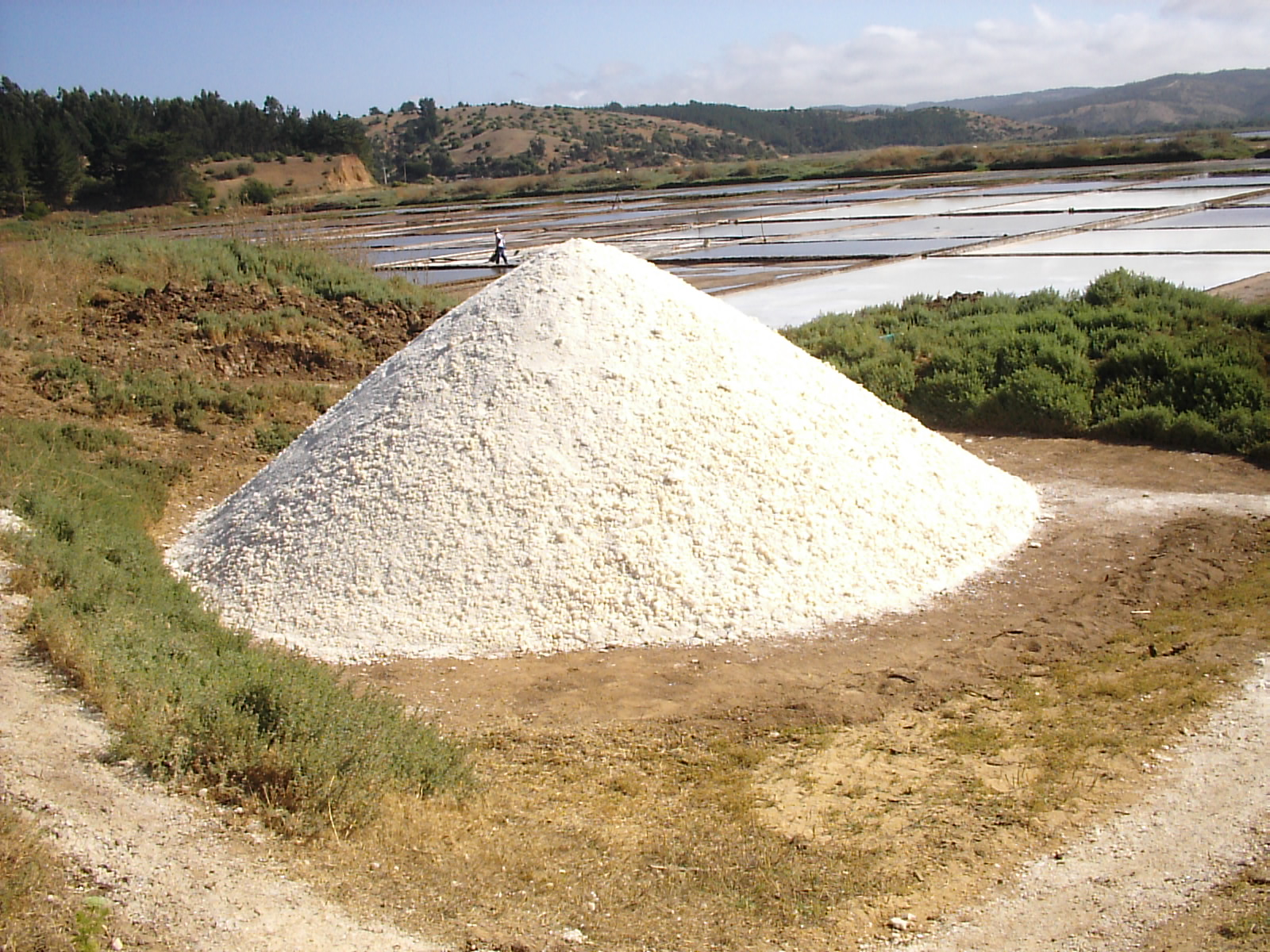
Promaucaes exploited the Cáhuil salines, at least since the 16th century.

Promaucaes were the first inhabitants of the Pichilemu area. Promaucaes were hunter-gatherers and fishermen who lived primarily along the Cachapoal and Maule rivers. Promaucaes also exploited Cáhuil salines.

On January 24, 1544, Spanish conqueror Pedro de Valdivia gave Juan Gómez de Almagro the Topocalma encomienda in which Pichilemu was supposed to be, according to Chilean historiographer José Toribio Medina on his book Los Restos Indígenas de Pichilemu.

The indians that the Spaniards found in that place [Pichilemu] undoubtfully were Promaucaes, and they must have formed part of the Topocalma encomienda, that was given on January 24, 1544 by Pedro de Valdivia to Juan Gómez de Almagro. Both facts are deduced from the text of that encomienda's certificate: "I give to you Juan Gómez, said Valdivia, the Palloquierbico, Topocalma, and Gualauquén chieftains, along with their relatives and indians, that are [living] in the Promaucaes provinces, near the sea coast."

— José Toribio Medina, Los Restos Indígenas de Pichilemu, Imprenta Cervantes, 1908.

In late 16th century, Spanish monks started to plant vineyards in Pichilemu. In 1607, Spanish Governor Alonso García Ramón gave Captain Tomás Duran land near Petrel Lagoon, where Pichilemu is currently located.

In 1611, a piece of land near Topocalma was given by the Captaincy General of Chile to Bartolomé de Rojas y Puebla, who later acquired more lands to establish Hacienda San Antonio de Petrel. Petrel gave Rojas y Puebla and to its successive owners a good income, through the manufacture of leather, jerky, soles, tallow and cordovan, as well as the grazing lease to other farmers, the granting of permits to graze their animals and their care. Products from Petrel were exported to Peru, and sold in Santiago and Valparaíso. Petrel was also severely affected by drought periods in 1730, 1740 and 1780.

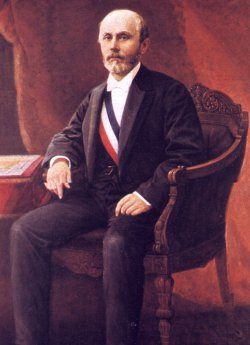
Portrait of President Aníbal Pinto.

In the early 17th century, a census made in Colchagua reported that Cáhuil, the most important area administratively in the current Pichilemu area, had 1,678 inhabitants.

In 1778 a church was constructed in Ciruelos and designated a vice parish. Years later, in 1864, it became a parish. As of 1787, Pichilemu had 1,688 inhabitants.

In late 1860s, the construction of the railway from San Fernando to Pichilemu was started. It ended in 1926.

In 1872, President of Chile Aníbal Pinto commissioned the corvette captain Francisco Vidal Gormaz to perform a survey of the coast between Tumán Creek and Boca del Mataquito. Vidal noted in his research that Matanzas, Sirenas, Pupuya, Los Piures, and Cáhuil were too open for ferries. He named Tumán, Topocalma, and Pichilemu as places with better hydrographic conditions, and concluded that Pichilemu was the best place to construct a ferry.

San Antonio de Petrel, owned by Ortúzar family these years, was first called "Pichilemu" in 1873, and was described as a village. Ortúzar constructed a dock in 1875, which served as a fishing port for a few years. Pedro Pavez Polanco and Ortúzar Cuevas were large-landholding families, and they built historic homes and buildings, such as Pichilemu post office building, over the years.

In 1885, Agustín Ross, a Chilean writer, Member of Parliament, minister, and politician, bought a 300-hectare (740-acre) tract of land and named it La Posada (English: The Inn). At the time, it was merely a set of thick-walled barracks. Ross constructed the Ross Park and Great Hotel Pichilemu (Gran Hotel Pichilemu) that year. Great Hotel Pichilemu, currently named Ross Hotel, is one of the oldest hotels in Chile.

=When he came here, there was nothing. [Just] a pair of houses, at most. He began to give the town a form, he gave it European looks. Look at those balustrades that decorate the seaboard or the ones that border the park, they are the same that Mr. Agustín saw in Biarritz.

Cuando él llegó, acá no había nada. Un par de casas, cuando mucho. Él fue dando forma al pueblo, él le dio aires europeos. Mire esas balaustradas que adornan la costanera o las que bordean el parque, son las mismas que don Agustín vio en Biarritz.

— Jaime Parra, Balnearios con Historia (III), El Mercurio, January 22, 2000.

In 1887, President José Manuel Balmaceda decreed Pichilemu as a minor dock. In March 1887, the first merchant ship arrived at Pichilemu. Some years later, during the 1891 Chilean Civil War, Daniel Ortúzar and the priest of Alcones transferred prisoners to and from Pichilemu via the dock, Balmacedian troops, directed by Juan García Valdivieso, moved to Pichilemu, and burned the dock. It was later reconstructed and used until 1912, but did not reach "port" status.

== Foundation and early years as Municipality ==
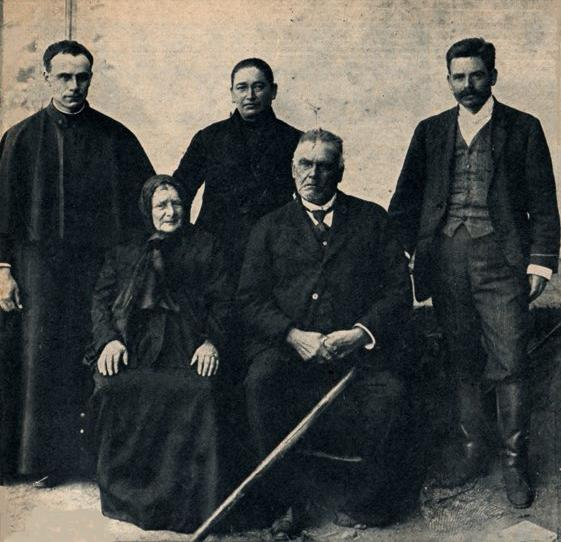
The Caro Rodríguez family, in 1906. From left to right: José María Caro Rodríguez (the first Chilean Catholic Cardinal), Rita Rodríguez Cornejo, Rita Caro Rodríguez, José María Caro Martínez (the first Mayor of Pichilemu), and Pedro Pablo Caro Rodríguez.

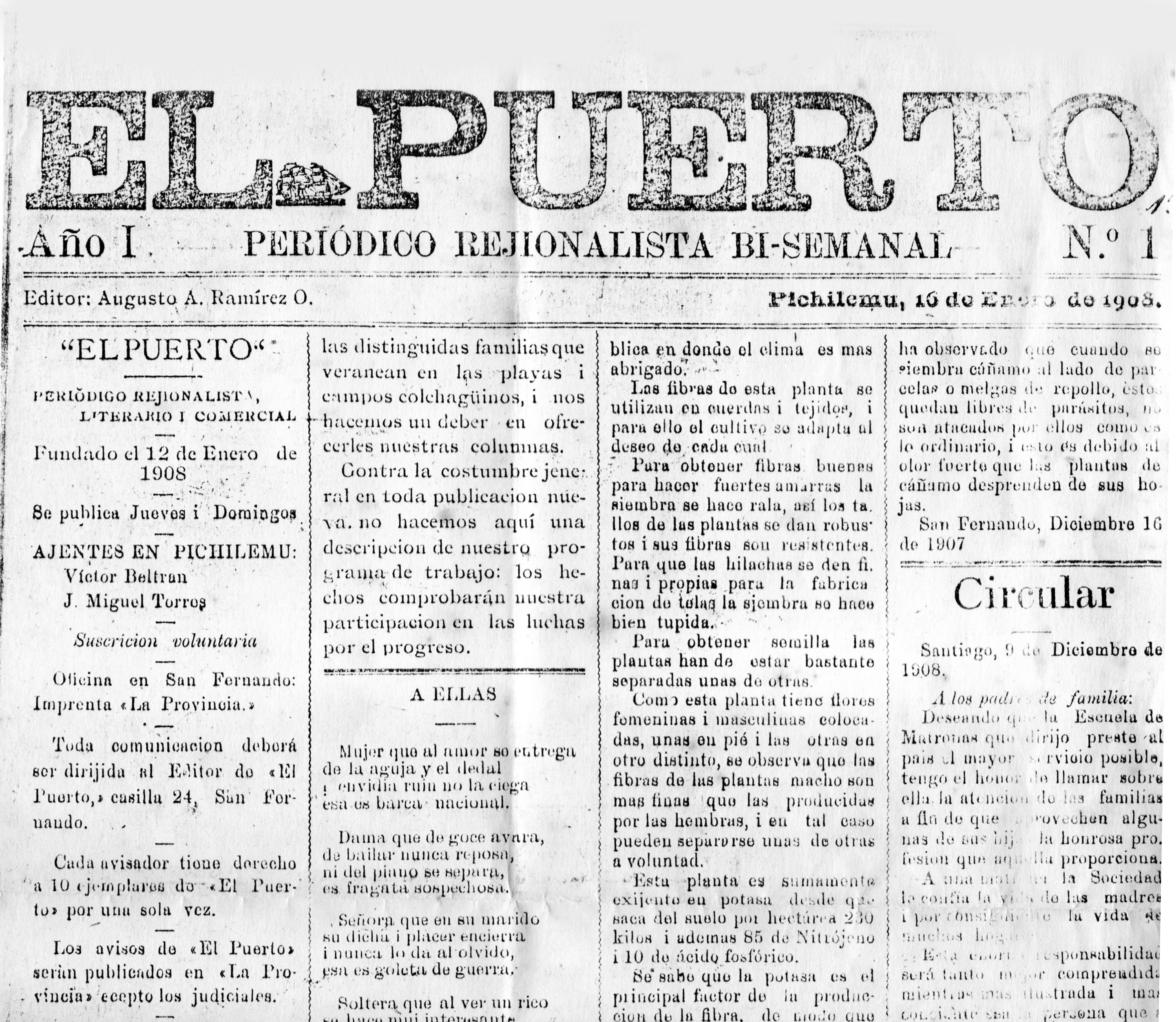
Front page of the first issue of El Puerto (1908).

The Lauriano Gaete and Ninfa Vargas' heirs founded the village of Pichilemu, with the help of engineer Emilio Nichón, who designed the city plan. They shortly started to construct based on the newly designated plan and the Ortúzar neighborhood's one.

Shortly after the 1891 Civil War ended, the newly elected President Jorge Montt and his Interior Minister, Manuel José Irarrázabal, promulgated the "law of the autonomous commune", creating a thousand and ninety four communes, including Pichilemu.

In 1894, the Municipality was created; Pichilemu covered the territories of current Pumanque and Marchihue (at these times, known as Yerbas Buenas); and a group of neighbors and taxpayers held a meeting to elect the first (main), second and third Mayors (Alcaldes), in addition to a number of regidores. José María Caro Martínez was elected as the first Mayor of Pichilemu. Caro formalized the city plan in 1894.

Caro Martínez was elected for four consecutive periods: 1894–1897; 1897–1900; 1900–1903; and 1903–1906, but he left the office in 1905. The Second Mayor, Francisco Javier Asalgado succeeded him, and held the office until 1909.

In 1905, Agustín Ross constructed a building that hosted the first mail and telegraph service in Pichilemu and a big store. The building had three floors, and was raised using imported materials. The building was opened as the first casino in Chile on January 20, 1906.

In 1908, Agustín Ross and Evaristo Merino reported to historiographer José Toribio Medina the existence of indigenous remains in a Pichileminian cave. Medina asked Argentinian ethnographer Félix Faustino Outes to inspect the remains, and subsequently Medina wrote the book "Los Restos Indígenas de Pichilemu", with the complete report Faustino Outes gave him. Earlier that year, on January 16, the first newspaper of Pichilemu, El Puerto, was founded by the sanfernandino Augusto Ramírez; however, the newspaper did not have much success, but on January 14, 1917, Ramírez began publishing El Marino. Only thirty-three different editions of El Marino were published.

In March 1909, new municipal elections took place, but there were conflicts in the checkup of the results. In September, the Chilean Appeals Court proclaimed Carlos Salas Salas as Mayor of Pichilemu. Francisco Javier Asalgado succeeded him in 1912, but he renounced in June of that year. José Santos Becerra assumed shortly after that.

== Bibliography ==
- Juan Guillermo Muñoz Correa (1983). San Antonio de Petrel: Tenencia, Producción y Trabajo en una Hacienda Costera de Chile Central, Siglos XVII y XVIII (in Spanish). Chile.
