= José María Caro Martínez =

Chilean politician

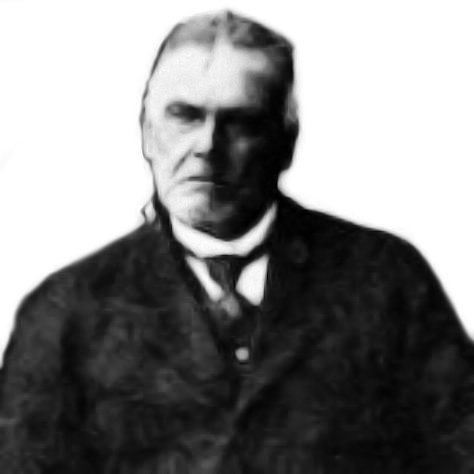

1st Mayor of Pichilemu
- In office 6 May 1894 – 7 May 1905
- Succeeded by: Francisco Javier Asalgado

Subdelegate for the 13th Cáhuil Subdelegation of the San Fernando Department
- In office 1891–1892
- President: Jorge Montt
- Succeeded by: José Domingo Fuenzalida

Personal details
- Born: 1830 San Antonio de Petrel, Pichilemu, Chile
- Died: 11 November 1916 (aged 85–86) Ciruelos, Pichilemu, Chile
- Party: Conservative Party
- Spouse: Rita Rodríguez Cornejo (m. 1860)
- Children: 9, including José María Caro Rodríguez; Francisco Caro Rodríguez; Pedro Pablo Caro Rodríguez
- Occupation: Politician; Civil servant

José María Caro Martínez (Note: In this Spanish name, the first or paternal surname is Caro and the second or maternal family name is Martínez.) (Spanish pronunciation: [xoˈse maˈɾia ˈkaɾo maɾˈtineθ]; 1830 – 11 November 1916) was a Chilean politician and civil servant. In May 1894, he was unanimously elected as the first mayor of the commune of Pichilemu, with Pedro Nolasco de Mira and Francisco Reyes made second and third magistrate respectively. Caro Martínez had previously served for several years as administrator or llavero of the San Antonio de Petrel hacienda and, between 1891 and 1892, was the Subdelegate of the 13th Subdelegation of San Fernando Department which comprised the district of Cáhuil.

The eleven-year mayorship of Caro Martínez, which lasted from 1894 and 1905, was described by journalist and local historian José Arraño Acevedo as "the most fruitful" in the history of the commune. In his four terms, Caro Martínez built roads connecting Pichilemu and San Fernando, capital of the department of the same name, and founded several schools in Pichilemu and parts of current Marchigüe.

He resigned in May 1905 and completed his fourth mayoral term as a segundo alcalde. As a mayor, he was succeeded by Francisco Javier Asalgado who held the office for two non-consecutive terms. Caro Martínez was the father of the following progeny: José María Caro Rodríguez, who became the first Chilean Cardinal of the Roman Catholic Church; Francisco Adriano Caro Rodríguez, who became first the regidor for multiple terms intermittently since 1906 and then the eighth mayor of Pichilemu on the resignation of Luis Barahona Fornés in December 1925; as well as Pedro Pablo Caro Rodríguez, a lawyer from the University of Chile who became an active judge in several Chilean cities.

== Early life ==
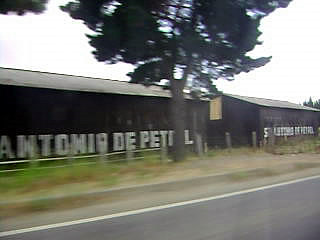
Caro Martínez was the llavero (administrator) of the hacienda San Antonio de Petrel.

José María Caro Martínez was born in San Antonio de Petrel, in current Pichilemu, Region of O'Higgins, to Pedro Pascual Caro Gaete and Cayetana Martínez Ríos, in 1830. The exact birth date is unknown, since all the books of the parish of Ciruelos with baptism records between 1830 and 1834 were burnt in a fire. The Caro Martínez family, of "devout Catholics", is described as having a "profound Christian faith," with their members "complying with unblemished devotion their Christian duties." Since he was a child, Caro shaped his personality on the "fulfillment of his duties"; according to a 1944 article from the Pichilemu newspaper, "his personality became even more robust in his youth as he faced an accident whose consequences stood by him until his death." (Note: Original Spanish quote: "Desde niño formó su carácter en el cumplimiento de sus deberes, caráter (sic) que se robusteció aun más en su juventud cuando hubo de soportar un accidente cuyas consecuencias lo acompañaron hasta la tumba.")

Like his father, he dedicated his life to agricultural activities, and "managed to raise a small fortune." Caro served for several years as administrator (llavero) of the hacienda of San Antonio de Petrel, property of José Vicente Ortúzar Formas. During his administration of San Antonio de Petrel, the hacienda was "rich", as it "possessed 1,500 cows, [...] and produced yearly 15 thousand sacks of wheat, each of 100 kilograms."

Caro Martínez and his family lived in the Petrel area until the 1880s, when they moved to nearby village Quebrada del Nuevo Reino; he lived there until his death. Caro Martínez became an active member of the parish of Ciruelos. According to journalist José Arraño Acevedo, the archives of the Archiepiscopate of Santiago —which are published yearly— show he was elected as a steward of the Confraternity of the Blessed Sacrament for the years of 1888, 1890, 1892, and 1900.

== Political career ==
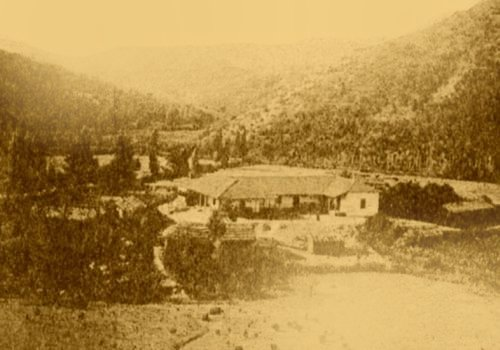
House of the Caro Rodríguez family, in Quebrada del Nuevo Reino

Caro Martínez was a member of the Conservative Party of Chile, and was appointed by the party's leaders as the perpetual president of the party's seat in the commune of Pichilemu. In 1891, he was appointed by President Jorge Montt Álvarez as subdelegate of the 13th Subdelegation of San Fernando Department, which comprised the district of Cáhuil, territory of the current commune of Pichilemu. He held the position until 1892, and was succeeded by José Domingo Fuenzalida.

Also in 1891, on 21 December, the commune of Pichilemu was created by the Autonomous Commune Law (Spanish: Ley de Comuna Autónoma), written by Ministry of the Interior Manuel José Irarrázabal Larraín. The new commune comprised the districts of Cáhuil, Peñablanca, and Cocauquén. It was one of the most extensive communes of the department of San Fernando. However, the local government was yet to be established.

On 21 March 1894, a preparatory meeting was held to create a Junta Calificadora de Poderes —an organisation that would be in charge of the elections. Caro Martínez was elected president of the Junta Calificadora in the meeting. Later that year, on 6 May, the first municipal meeting (sesión municipal) was held. During the meeting, Caro Martínez, aged 64, was unanimously elected as the first Mayor of Pichilemu since its creation as a commune. (Note: Contemporary legislation stipulated the election of three mayors for the same three-year term. In case of the death or resignation of the primer alcalde, the segundo alcalde would succeed him, and the tercer alcalde would take the remaining vacancy.) Pedro Nolasco de Mira, and Francisco Reyes were elected as segundo, and tercer alcalde, respectively, and Francisco Cerón, José Leonardo Lizana, Ceferino Rosales, Benjamín Calderón, and Francisco León as regidores.

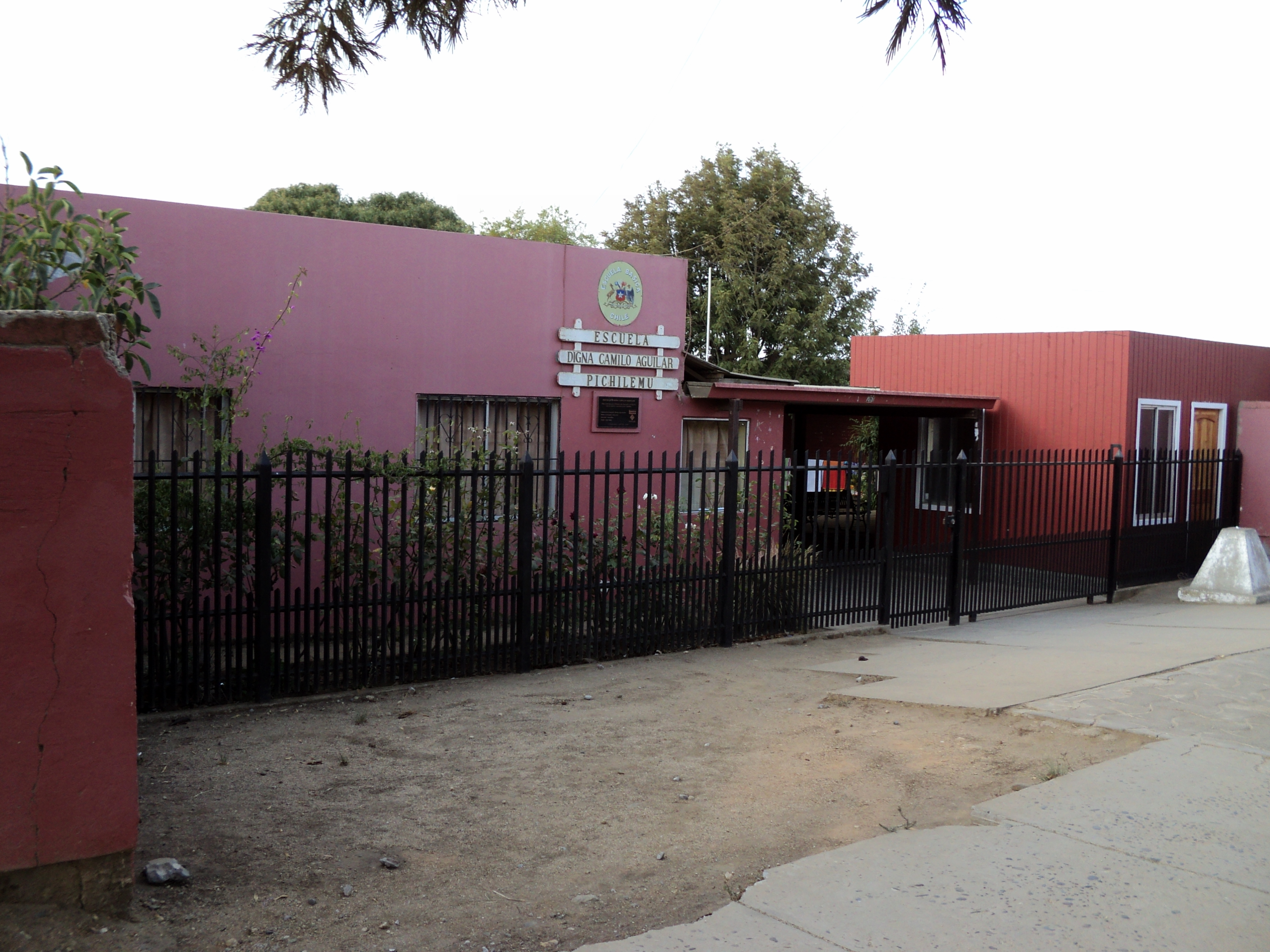
Caro Martínez founded a school in central Pichilemu, currently known as the Escuela Digna Camilo Aguilar.

Immediately after his election, Caro Martínez created the local police force (Cuerpo de Policía Local). He also constructed roads all over the commune of Pichilemu, with special attention to those that would connect Pichilemu with the central area of the department of San Fernando, specifically the commune of San Fernando, and Santiago, the capital of Chile. As part of this project, he constructed a bridge over the Petrel Lake, known as the Puente Negro (Black Bridge), and another in Cáhuil, connecting that town with its saltworks. He also founded several schools in the Pichilemu area, which only had one, located in Ciruelos. Those include the schools of Yerbas Buenas, Las Garzas, Trinidad, Molineros, Peñablanca, all in the current territory of the commune of Marchigüe, and one in central Pichilemu.

Other works during Caro Martínez's mayorship include the grant of 1,300 Chilean pesos for the design of plans for the construction of the railway from Alcones to Pichilemu, and the installation of a water tank, located in the house of municipal secretary Albino Pulgar. Additionally, the government of Caro Martínez determined the urban limits of the commune of Pichilemu, gave help to victims of heavy rainstorms that hit the area in the time, brought Carabineros forces to "scare away" bandits from the local farms, and made repairs to the roads of Marchigüe, Trinidad, Molineros, and Peñablanca.

Caro Martínez was re-elected mayor (primer alcalde) of Pichilemu in 1897, 1900, and 1903. On 7 May 1905, just one year before his fourth term expired, he decided to resign to the primer alcalde office, and took a position as segundo alcalde of Pichilemu until 1906. Following his resignation, Francisco Javier Asalgado became the mayor, and held the office between that year and 1909, and again in 1912, but only for less than a month.

His mayorship was described by historian José Arraño Acevedo as "the most fruitful [...] in the municipal life of Pichilemu." Caro Martínez was described by Virgilio Figueroa, biographer of his son José María Caro Rodríguez, as "an individual with public spirit and leadership skills." According to Washington Saldías in an article published in Pichilemu News, Caro Martínez's mayorship has been the longest in the history of Pichilemu.

== Later life, death, and legacy ==
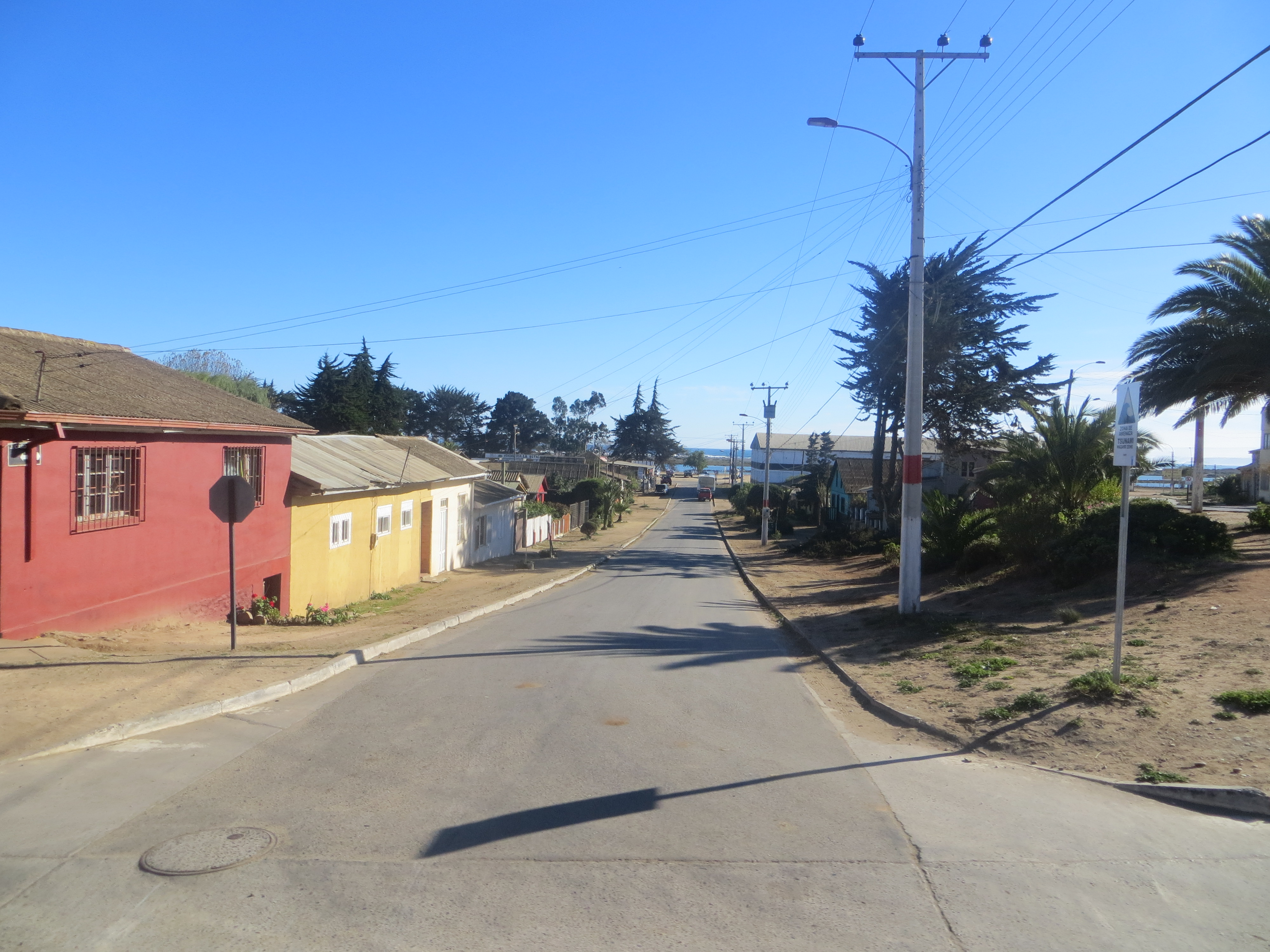
Alcalde Caro Martínez street, in the Pavez Polanco neighborhood of Pichilemu

According to José Arraño Acevedo's 1980 article "José María Caro Martínez, Primer Alcalde de Pichilemu", following his retirement from politics in 1906, Caro Martínez "stayed watchful to everything that was being done in favour of the commune he led so aptly." He appears as a subscriber of El Puerto, the first newspaper published in Pichilemu, which only printed three editions. In the first edition of the newspaper, dated 16 January 1908, an article states that José María Caro Martínez and Exequiel Fernández were awarded 200 pesos in a raffle held on the previous day in the headquarters of the La Unión newspaper, in Santiago.

In late September–early October 1916, he became ill with an unspecified disease, which forty days later, in the night of that 11 November, "won against his strong physique" and provoked his death at age 86. Caro was subsequently cremated and is buried with his wife Rita, who died at age 97 on 7 August 1931, (Note: Arraño Acevedo's 1980 article states Rodríguez died at age 98.) in a mausoleum constructed by their son José María, located at the churchyard of Ciruelos.

Almost eighty years after his death, in December 1991, the government of Mayor René Maturana Maldonado decreed, as part of the celebrations of the centennial of the commune's creation, the renaming of several streets of the commune whose original names "caused confusion because they were repeated in other streets", to new names of "relevant people of the [local] history." As a result, J. M. Caro street (Calle J. M. Caro) in the Pavez Polanco neighborhood was renamed to Alcalde Caro Martínez street (Calle Alcalde Caro Martínez) in honour of the commune's first mayor.

== Family ==
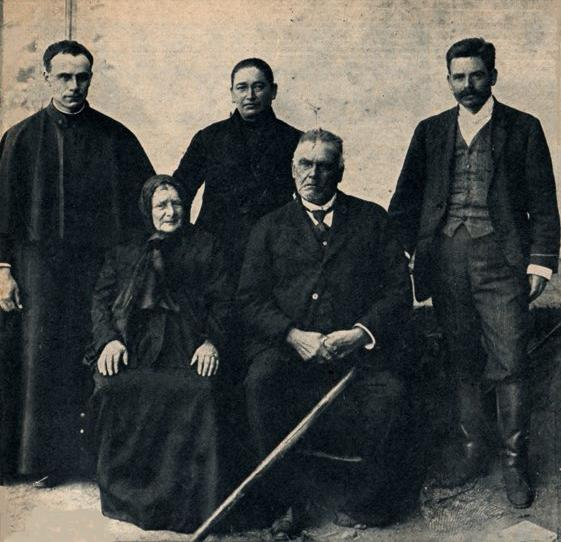
Caro family. In front: Caro Martínez and his wife Rita; in the back, their children José María, Rita, and Pedro Pablo.

Caro Martínez married Rita Rodríguez Cornejo (1833–1931) on 20 February 1860 at the chapel of San Antonio de Petrel. (Note: The 15 March 1944 edition of Pichilemu contests this statement, by saying Caro married Rodríguez in 1858. Original Spanish quote: "En 1858 contrajo matrimonio con doña Rita Rodríguez Cornejo su hogar se vió alumbrado con la alegría de nueve hijos." Translation: "In 1858 [he] contracted marriage with Rita Rodríguez Cornejo[;] his home was brightened with the happiness of nine children.") The couple had nine children, all born in San Antonio de Petrel: Rita, Cristina, Petronila, José María, Pedro Pascual, Francisco Adriano, Pedro Pablo, Cayetana, and Rosa.

José María (1866–1958) became a Catholic priest; he served as Archbishop of Santiago from 1939 until his death, and in 1946 he became the first Chilean Cardinal of the Church. Francisco Adriano became, like his father, involved in politics, serving for several terms as regidor of the commune of Pichilemu between 1906 and 24 December 1925, when he became the 8th Mayor of Pichilemu, following the resignation of Luis Antonio Barahona Fornés to run for a deputy seat. Francisco held the office until 22 May 1927, when President Carlos Ibáñez del Campo appointed Evaristo Merino as mayor of Pichilemu. Pedro Pablo (1875–1959) was a University of Chile lawyer, who served as acting judge in Castro, Cachapoal (Peumo), amid others; Pedro Pablo also served as secretary and treasurer of the commune of Buin.

== Notes ==
Political offices
First	Mayor of Pichilemu; 1894–1905	Succeeded by Francisco Javier Asalgado
Unknown	Subdelegate of the 13th Subdelegation of San Fernando Department; Cáhuil; 1891–1892	Succeeded by José Domingo Fuenzalida
