= Agustín Ross Cultural Centre =

Cultural centre in Chile

- Centro Cultural Agustín Ross
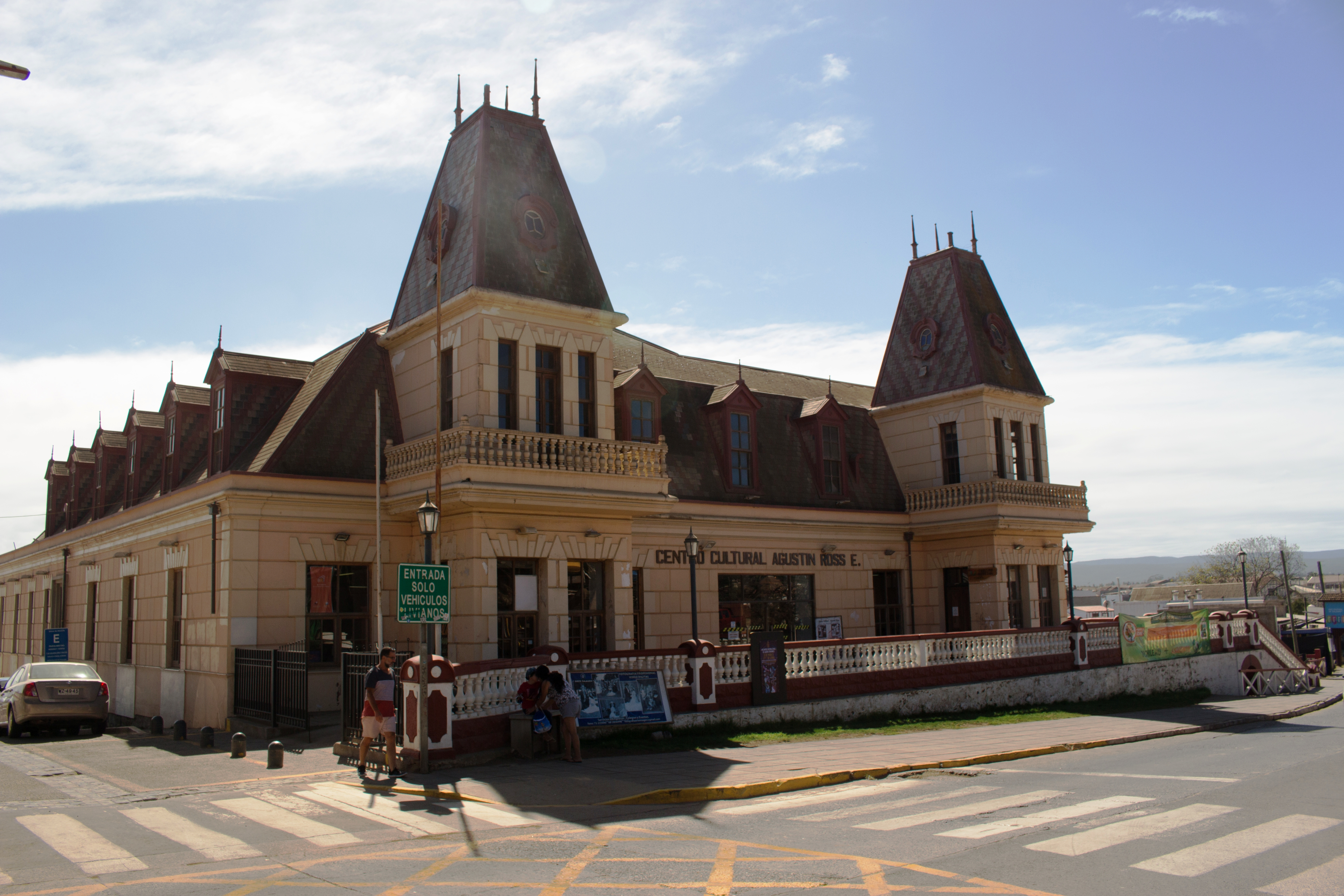
- Agustín Ross Cultural Centre in 2017.

General information
- Type: Cultural center
- Architectural style: French Baroque; highly influenced by the Grand Trianon
- Location: Pichilemu, Chile, Agustín Ross Avenue, in front of the Agustín Ross Park
- Coordinates: 34.38658°S 72.00976°W
- Inaugurated: 1909 (construction: 1906–1909)
- Renovated: 2009; 2011
- Cost: 1,327,404USD
- Owner: Government of Pichilemu / Corporación Cultural de Pichilemu (2009–present)

Dimensions
- Diameter: 1,936.04 square metres (20,839 ft^{2})

Technical details
- Floor count: Three

Design and construction
- Architect: Agustín Ross Edwards

National Monument of Chile
- Official name: Casino (antiguo) de Pichilemu
- Type: Monumento Histórico (Historic Monument)
- Designated: 25 February 1988
- Supreme Decree: #100 (published on 7 April 1988)
- Region: Libertador General Bernardo O'Higgins

Agustín Ross Cultural Centre (Spanish, Centro Cultural Agustín Ross), previously known as Casino Ross (Ross Casino), is the cultural center of the city of Pichilemu in Libertador General Bernardo O'Higgins Region, Chile. It was constructed between 1906 and 1909 at the request of politician Agustín Ross Edwards. The structure of the cultural center is very similar to that of the Grand Trianon in Versailles, France.

It is best known for housing one of the first casinos of Chile; a casino operated in the building between 1917 and 1931. After 1931 all casinos, except the newly opened Casino de Viña del Mar, were declared illegal. The building has also been used as a post office, a store selling imported goods, a hotel, a discotheque, and a bar. There were two attempts by the local government to purchase the building; the first time in 1982 failed while the second in 1995 succeeded. The former casino was declared a National Monument of Chile along with the Agustín Ross Park in February 1988.

Over time, the building deteriorated, and a project was approved in January 2007 for it to be renovated for use as a cultural center. The restored building opened in January 2009 and houses the local library. In January 2010, the cultural center was inaugurated by President Michelle Bachelet and Mayor Roberto Córdova.

== History ==
=== 1885–1906: The idea ===
Agustín Ross Edwards was a wealthy Chilean writer, member of parliament, government minister and politician. He reportedly had the dream of "creating a port which could be an alternative to the Valparaíso port," but this would turn later into "creating a touristic place, an elite resort, collecting the most important characteristics of European places, which would make it unique."

For this purpose, Ross Edwards bought Fundo Pichilemu, a farm, from Juan Esteban Torrealba Maturana in 1885. There was a little hotel in Fundo Pichilemu called La Posada, which he converted into a first-class hotel called the Gran Hotel Pichilemu (now the Agustín Ross Hotel). Following the development of the Gran Hotel Pichilemu, Ross Edwards saw the need of creating "a seaside resort with all the comforts and luxuries capable of seducing the Chilean aristocracy;" for this purpose, he conceived the idea of creating a park, and a post-office building. Afterwards, Agustín Ross installed amenities such as a laundry, stables, and stairways, among others, according to local historian José Arraño Acevedo, turning Pichilemu into a summer resort town for affluent people from Santiago and Mendoza, Argentina.

=== 1906–1930: Construction; the casino ===
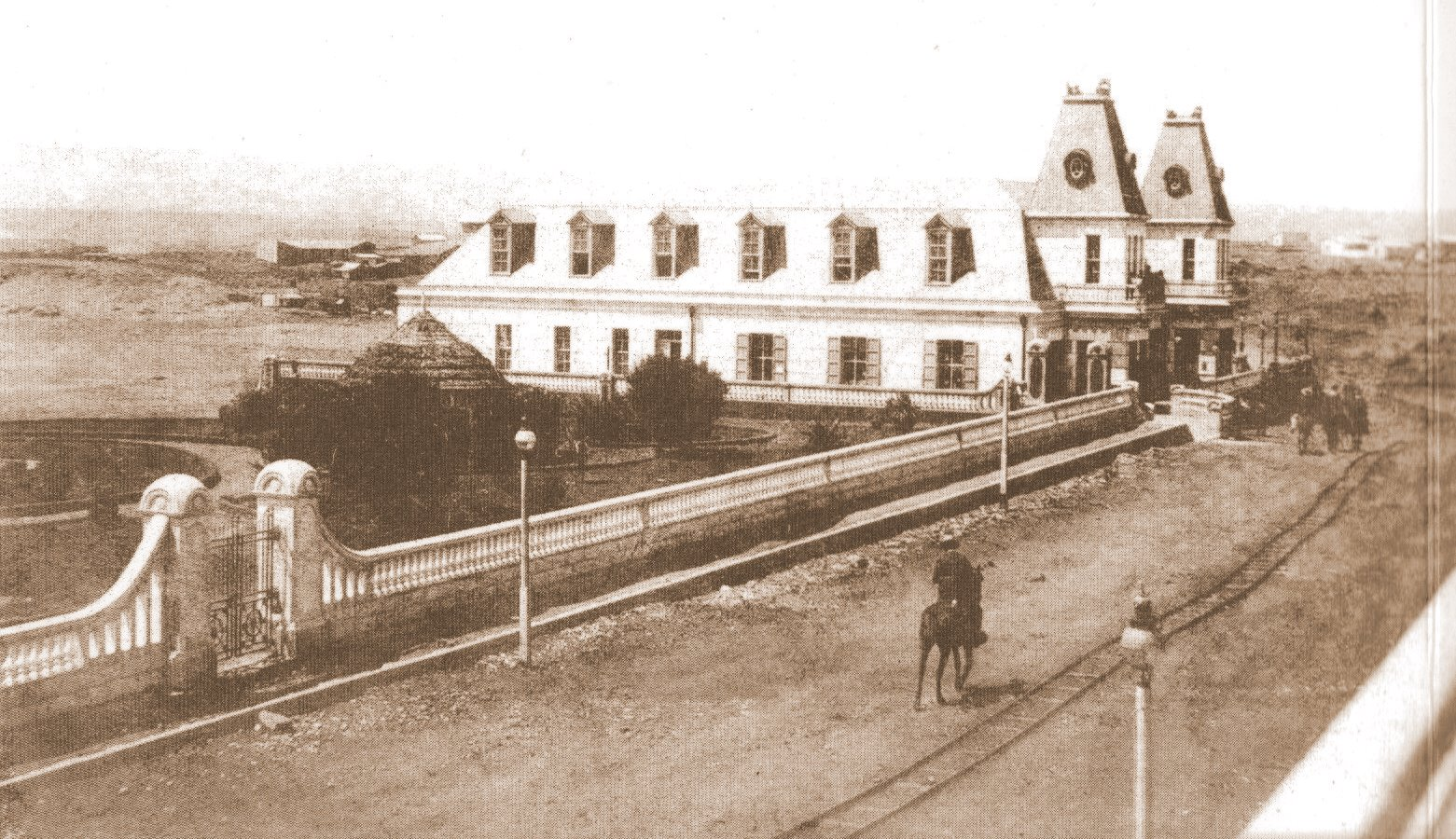
The building circa 1910.

According to Washington Saldías González, editor of Pichilemu News, the construction of the building lasted from 1906 to 1909, while Jorge Godoy Rojas, architect of the University of Chile, states that it was built between 1904 and 1906. Ross wanted it to look similar to the Grand Trianon of the Tuileries Palace in Paris, France; he imported building materials and furniture from France and England. After its opening, the building included a post office with telegraph service and a store for imported goods, exclusive to clients of the Gran Hotel Pichilemu.

The National Monuments Council asserts that the first casino in Chile was opened in the building in 1906; however, historians Antonio Saldías and José Arraño Acevedo have pointed out that it was inaugurated as a de facto casino in the summer of 1917, after Agustín Ross rented the building to Argentinean businessman Alfredo Master. Saldías also noted that there were casinos in Chile before Agustín Ross's arrival in Pichilemu, in towns such as Constitución. The casino operated until 1931, when the Casino de Viña del Mar, the first official casino of Chile, opened; all others were declared illegal. Ross died in 1925 aged 82 in Viña del Mar, just months before "one of his greatest" dreams was accomplished: the railway from Palmilla and the local railway station.

=== 1930–1995: The discotheques; the National Monument ===
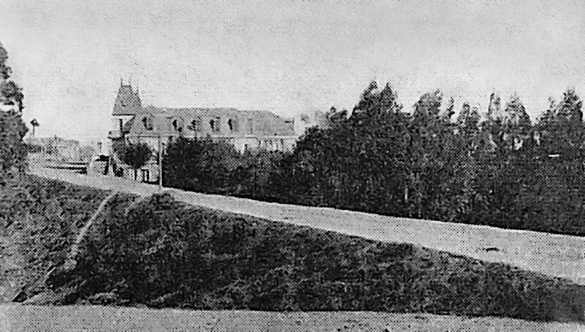
The former Ross Casino in 1935.

Ad published in Pichilemu on 30 April 1944, promoting the Gran Hotel Casino, owned by Luis González Osorio.

After the casino closed, the building was mostly left unused until the 1940s, when the González Pérez family purchased it from Agustín Ross de Ferrari, a descendant of Ross Edwards. The family converted the building into a hotel, and in the late 1940s, the underground floor was remodeled and made a clandestine casino. Twenty years later, in the late 1960s, Gustavo González Pérez, then a pilot in the Chilean Air Force, along with another member of the Air Force, created an American-style discotheque called La Caverna (The Cavern) in the basement. Years later, González Pérez transferred the business to other members of his family, who renamed the discotheque Los Tijuana (The Tijuanas). Finally, the González Pérez family decided to close the discotheque in the late 1970s. Shortly afterwards, Rancagua businesswoman Carmelita Tello installed a boîte called Carmelita in the main room. Later, Pichileminian Roberto Álvarez decided to run a discotheque called Master in the same place, while at the same time, there was a grill bar called Wa-Na in another room; both businesses operated until the 1990s. The condition of the building gradually deteriorated, and its use became restricted.

During the administration of Mayor Julio Waidele Wolff (1981–1983), an attempt was made to buy the building with municipal funds; however, Waidele was not allowed to complete the purchase because the price of eight million pesos (approximately US$16,000) was "too high for the municipal budget, and would leave many things without financing." The building would finally be purchased in 1995 by Mayor Orlando Cornejo Bustamante with the support of the Pichilemu City Council, then composed of Aldo Polanco Contreras, Jorge Vargas González, Mario Bichón Cáceres, Mariano Polanco Galarce, and Raúl Tobar Pavez, for 30 million pesos (approximately US$60,000).

In 1987, after the re-inauguration of another work of Agustín Ross, the Ross Park, a request was made to the National Monuments Council that both the park and the former casino be declared Monumentos Históricos (National Monuments); they were so designated on 25 February 1988.

=== 1995–2008: Restoration ===
After the former casino was purchased by the government of Pichilemu, the building was used to hold meetings, exhibitions of paintings, sculptures, theater, and for launching books. In 1997, the Club Aéreo de Pichilemu (Aero Club of Pichilemu) requested the building to host the fiftieth annual reunion of the Air Federation of Chile. Permission was granted, but the Club Aéreo had to purchase toilet fixtures, as the ones in the building were seriously damaged. This prompted the government of Mayor Jorge Vargas González (1996–2007) to begin restoring the deteriorated former casino, but it was not until 2004 that the Regional Government of Libertador General Bernardo O'Higgins Region approved financing for a restoration design study. The study by the Department of Architecture of the Ministry of Public Works began in 2005 and lasted until mid–2006. Afterwards, on 15 December, Intendant of Libertador General Bernardo O'Higgins Region Héctor Leiva Polanco unveiled to the community of Pichilemu the design and announced that he would present a financing proposal during the next year to the Fondo Nacional de Desarrollo Regional (National Fund of Regional Development). The project was approved on 23 January 2007; the budget, according to architect Jorge Godoy Rojas, was 513,125,000 pesos (US$1,026,250). On 12 June 2007, the budget was increased to accommodate additional restoration work, by 100 million pesos to 663,702,000 pesos (US$1,327,404).

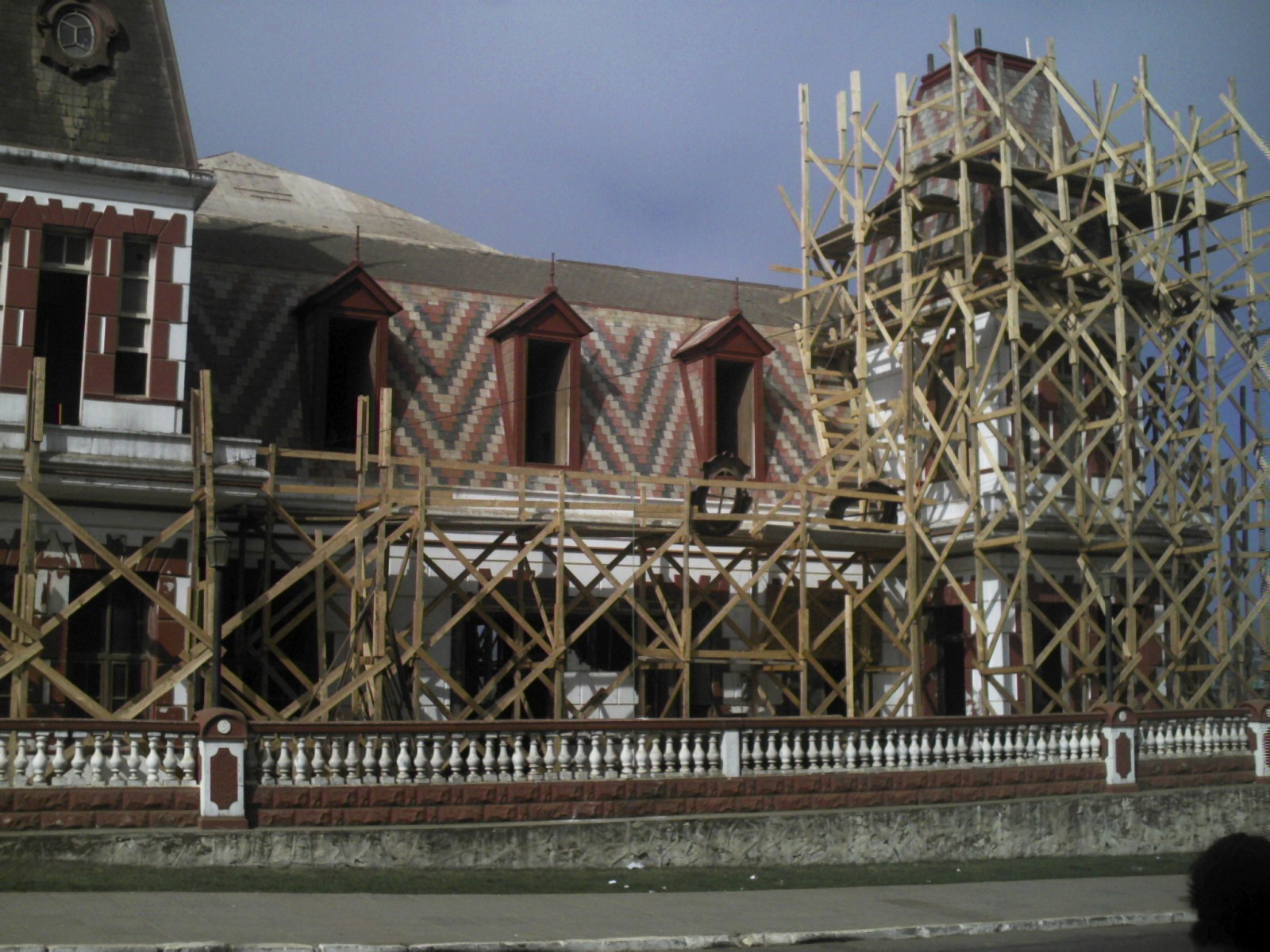
The former Agustín Ross Casino in January 2008, during its restoration.

On 14 February 2007, the Regional Secretary (Seremi) of the Ministry of Public Works, Beatriz Valenzuela, wrote in an article in the online newspaper El Rancahuaso, "The current state of the historic monument is bad, because of the deterioration of the roof, which over the years has had permanently leaked water and humidity. This can be easily seen in the damaged wood of its inside enclosure and the great frame of the mansard roof, which is of oak wood." Some months later, on 23 August, Valenzuela announced that the restoration of the building would begin that same day, after it was authorized by the Regional Government; the building would become a cultural center, housing the local public library and art galleries. The restoration work was the responsibility of development firm Atelier Consultores.

During the restoration of the casino, a number of historical items were found. Those included newspapers, specifically a copy of Las Últimas Noticias from February 1941, during the time the building served as a hotel; a US telephone battery from 1909; and a tile from the casino's ceiling with signatures and drawings by casino workers in 1915.

=== 2009–present: Cultural center ===
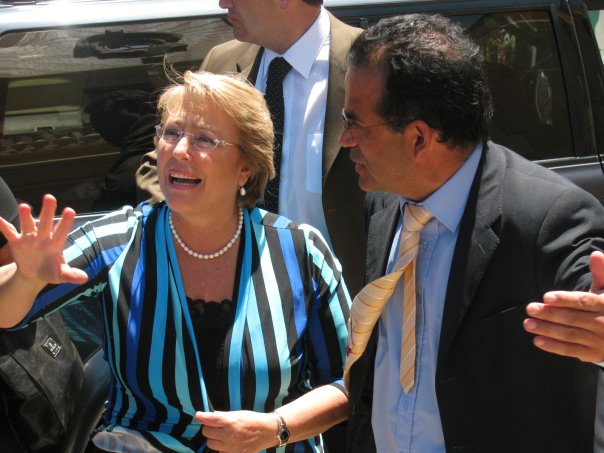
President Michelle Bachelet and Mayor Roberto Córdova during the inauguration of the cultural center in January 2010.

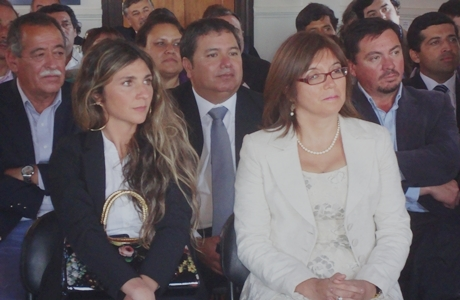
The inauguration ceremony of Governor of Cardenal Caro Teresa Núñez (right) took place at the Centro Cultural Agustín Ross, in March 2014.

The completely restored building opened on 23 January 2009, one hundred years after its original construction. An exhibition of photographs by Ana María Encina Lemarchand was the first to be staged in the restored building. In June 2009, a non-political organization called the Corporación Cultural de Pichilemu (Pichilemu Cultural Corporation) was formed to manage the cultural center, in coordination with the local government. The center's inauguration was supposed to take place in March of that year, with President Michelle Bachelet Jeria in attendance; however, it was postponed until 27 January 2010. Bachelet toured the rooms of the cultural center with Mayor Roberto Córdova, and later said that the center "[is] to merge itself with the origins of modern Pichilemu, restoring the facilities to do what is so necessary: to make room for the creativity, talent, imagination, dreams of so many young and many people." (Note: Quotation in the original Spanish: "se funde con los orígenes del Pichilemu moderno, restaurando sus instalaciones para hacer aquello que es tan necesario: dar cabida a la creatividad, al talento, a la imaginación, a los sueños de tantos jóvenes y de tantas personas")

After the earthquakes of 27 February, and 11 March 2010, the cultural center was "slightly" damaged. The balustrades of both the northwest and southeast towers of the building fell down after the earthquakes; in the northwest tower, a pole broke; and there were some cracks and minor damage to the walls. Repairs took place in February 2011, with an investment of fourteen million pesos (US$28,000) by the government of Pichilemu.

== Organization ==
The Centro Cultural Agustín Ross houses the local public library, and has four exhibition rooms, an auditorium, a music room, and several other rooms in which workshops take place for yoga, acrobatics, theatre, and other disciplines for people of all ages. The restoration of the cultural centre prompted the creation of an independent organization called the Corporación Cultural de Pichilemu (Pichilemu Cultural Corporation).

=== Public library ===
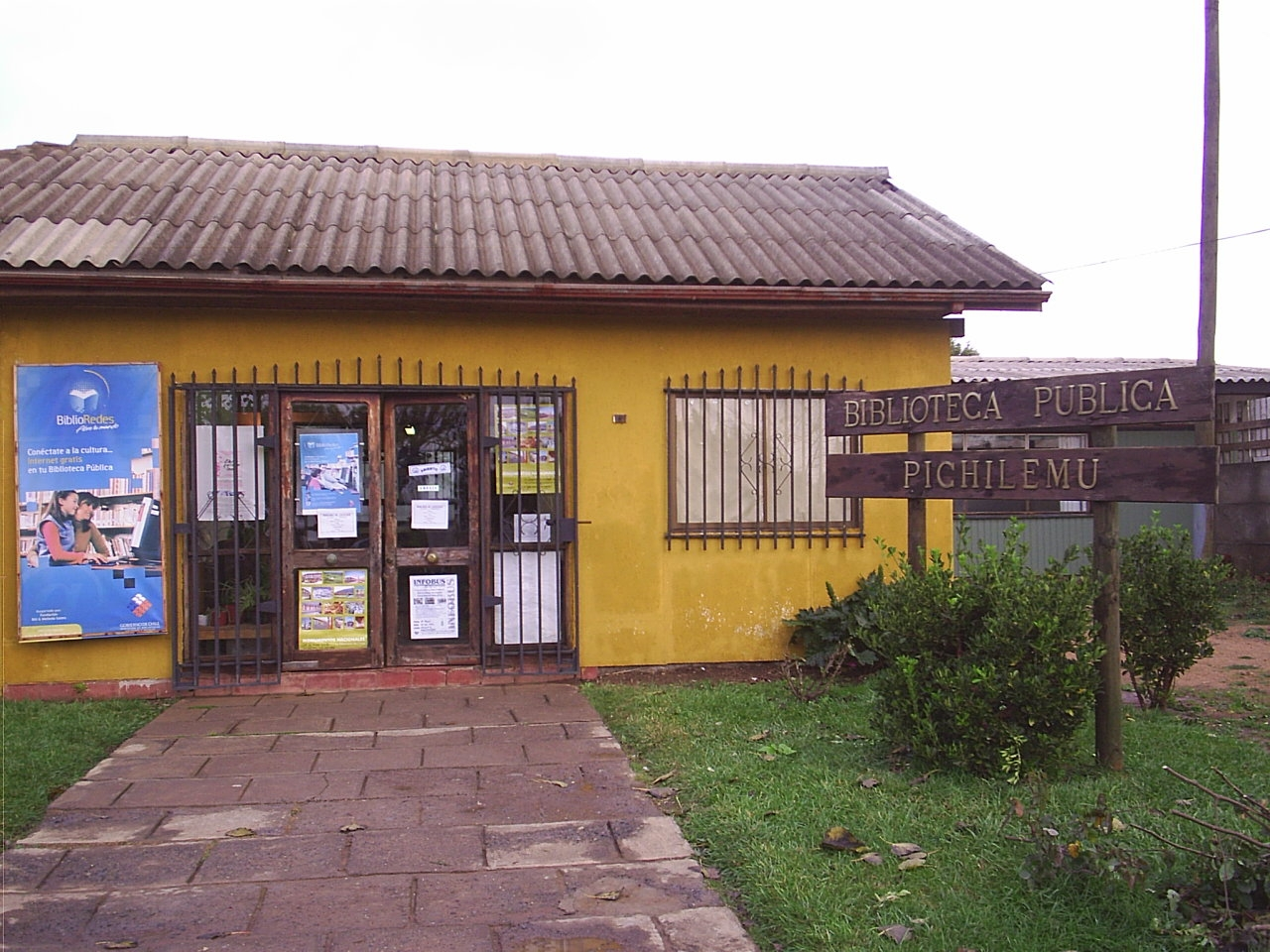
Logo of the Pichilemu Public Library, at the left, and the building where it was formerly located, at the right.

The Biblioteca Pública de Pichilemu (Public Library of Pichilemu) is the public library of the city of Pichilemu, and its director as of 2011 is María Angélica Yáñez Cortés. The library was created on 16 May 1989, under the leadership of Mayor René Maturana Maldonado.

The library was previously located in a dedicated building on Santa María Avenue from 1989 until 16 January 2009, before relocating to the Centro Cultural Agustín Ross. In September 2010, the library received a donation of 150 music and culture-related books with the help of Alejandra Domedel, the cultural center's communications and cultural management officer.

=== Pichilemu Cultural Corporation ===
Jorge Godoy Rojas, architect of the University of Chile, suggested in a January 2007 article he wrote for the online newspaper El Cachapoal that a semi-autonomous legal entity be set up for the management of the cultural center. Such a legal entity had also been suggested to the authorities previously by local cultural organizations for several years, but they had been largely ignored. On 20 November 2008, fourteen local organizations, including the Tourism Chamber of Pichilemu, the Agrupación Ciudadana por un Pichilemu Limpio (Citizens Group for a Clean Pichilemu), and Canal 3 Pichilemu, sent a letter to the Pichilemu City Council requesting the creation of the Corporación Cultural de Pichilemu (Pichilemu Cultural Corporation) for the third time.

In May 2009, municipal employee Jorge Torres Avaca reported that the Cultural Corporation had been approved by the City Council, and its constitution was to be drawn up on 2 June; it was approved on 11 June. Of the seven directors of the corporation, two are elected, two are appointed by the Pichilemu City Council, and another two by the regional or provincial government, and the mayor presides as the seventh member. Longtime Pichilemu resident sculptor Macarena Irarrázabal Correa and Professor Carlos Leyton Labarca, native of the nearby village of Ciruelos and creator of the Museo del Niño Rural (Museum of the Rural Child), were elected.

== In popular culture ==
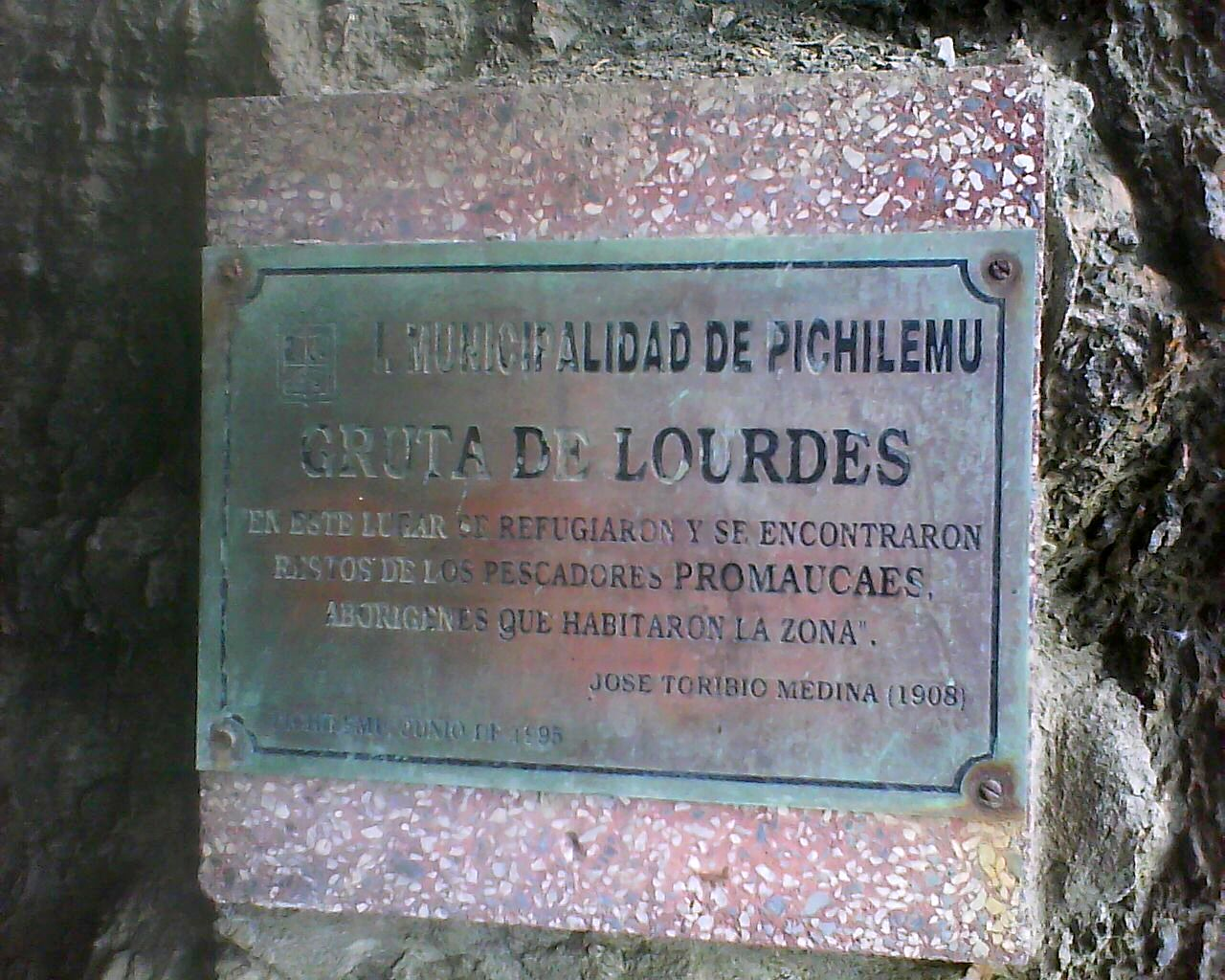
Sign at the entrance to the Gruta de la Virgen.

There is a popular myth surrounding the former casino which tells of caves between the Gruta de la Virgen (also known as the Gruta de Nuestra Señora de Lourdes; Grotto of Our Lady of Lourdes) and the building, crossing Agustín Ross Park. During the restoration of the building, in December 2007, it was reported that "two great walls constructed with flagstone, very wide and very close together" were found, but nothing was confirmed afterwards.

Before the former casino building was completed, in 1908, Agustín Ross Edwards and Evaristo Merino reported to historiographer José Toribio Medina the existence of indigenous remains in the cave now called the Gruta de la Virgen. Medina asked Argentinean ethnographer Félix Faustino Outes to inspect the remains, and subsequently Medina wrote the book Los Restos Indígenas de Pichilemu (The Indigenous Remains of Pichilemu), using the report Faustino Outes gave him.

American writer Trudy Larkin Forster wrote the book Los Gatos del Casino: la Historia de Don Agustín Ross Edwards y la Brigada de los Gatos Negros (The Cats of the Casino: the History of Sir Agustín Ross Edwards and the Brigade of the Black Cats) in 1999. The book is set in Pichilemu and the Agustín Ross Casino, and it was premiered in the Children's Book Fair of Santiago in June 1999, and then in the Agustín Ross Art Room (in current Centro Cultural Agustín Ross) on 18 September of that year.

== See also ==
- Agustín Ross Balcony
