= Pedro Pablo Caro =

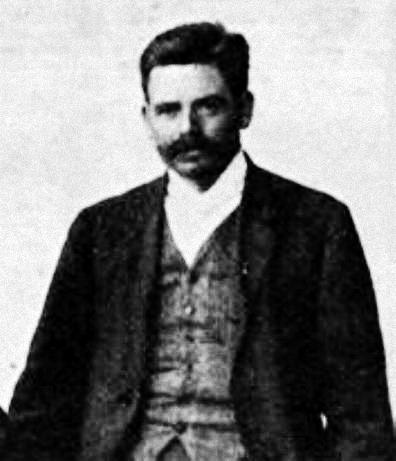
- Born: Pedro Pablo Caro Rodríguez; 12 May 1875; San Antonio de Petrel, Pichilemu, Chile
- Died: 3 July 1959 (aged 84); Rancagua, Chile
- Education: University of Chile
- Occupation: Lawyer
- Spouse(s): Clementina Leiva Espinoza (m. 1902) Elena Salinas Monzón
- Children: 6
- Parent(s): José María Caro Martínez; Rita Rodríguez Cornejo

Pedro Pablo Caro Rodríguez (12 May 1875 – 3 July 1959) was a Chilean lawyer. After obtaining the degree of law and political sciences from the University of Chile, he worked as an independent lawyer in Rancagua, and served as acting judges in several communes and departments in Chile, including San Carlos, Curicó, Nacimiento, among others. He was also a secretary and treasurer of the municipality of Buin. Caro Rodríguez was member of the Conservative Party of Chile, and later of the Christian Democrat Party of Chile.

== Biography ==
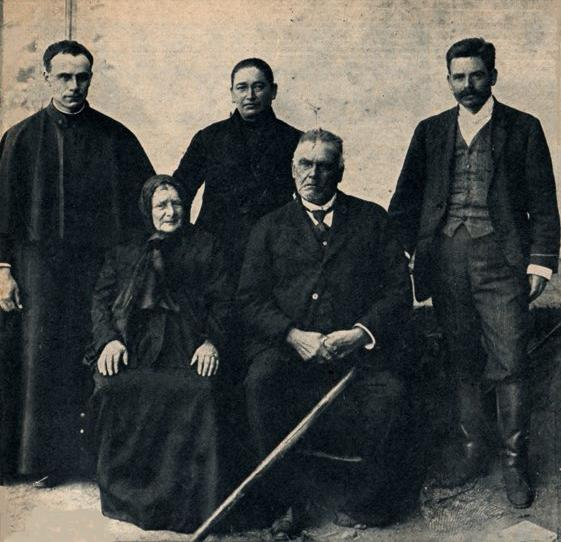
Caro family in 1906. In front: his father José María and his mother Rita; in the back, his siblings José María, Rita, and himself.

Pedro Pablo was born on 12 May 1875, to José María Caro Martínez (1830–1916), the first Mayor of Pichilemu, and Rita Rodríguez Cornejo (1834–1932), in the village of San Antonio de Petrel, Pichilemu, in current Cardenal Caro Province, Region of O'Higgins. He was the seventh child of the Caro Rodríguez marriage; among his siblings were José María (1866–1958), the first Chilean cardinal of the Roman Catholic Church, and Francisco Adriano, the eighth Mayor of Pichilemu.

Caro Rodríguez completed his secondary studies at Colegio Santo Tomás de Aquino. (Note: Armando de Ramón's book Biografías de chilenos states that he completed his secondary studies at Colegio Santo Tomás de Aquino; however, the one school that bears that name in Chile was founded in 1949. The book also incorrectly states that Caro Rodríguez graduated from the Pontifical Catholic University of Chile's career of law.) He obtained a bachelor's degree in philosophy and humanities from the University of Chile. In 1900, he obtained a bachelor's degree in Law and Political Sciences from the same university, and in the following year, he became a graduate in the same faculty. His thesis was titled "Deficiencias de nuestras actuales leyes sobre bosques y utilidad de su reforma". He was sworn in as a lawyer on 28 August 1901.

Later in 1901, Caro Rodríguez became secretary and treasurer of the municipality of Buin, in current Santiago Metropolitan Region. He married Clementina Leiva Espinoza in that city, on 7 June 1902. They had no children. Caro Rodríguez later married Elena Salinas Monzón, with whom he had six children.

Pedro Pablo Caro worked as an independent lawyer in Rancagua, current capital of the Region of O'Higgins, where he also served as dean lawyer, and as property tax promoter for the department of Rancagua between 12 June 1913 and the office's suppression in 1927. As a lawyer, he served as acting judge in several communes and departments: Castro Department (16 February – 1 April 1904), Cachapoal (Peumo) (1905), Lontué (1906), San Carlos (1907), Los Andes (1908), Nacimiento (1912), Curicó (Second Court) (1913), Cachapoal (1915), Rancagua (January 1918), and Caupolicán (Rengo) (1920). In 1952, he celebrated the "golden anniversary" of his professional career in that city.

Caro Rodríguez became a member of the Conservative Youth of Chile in 1913, and attended that year's convention as a delegate for Rengo. He became later a regular member of the Conservative Party of Chile. In his later years, in 1956, he became a member of the Christian Democrat Party of Chile.

Pedro Pablo Caro Rodríguez died in Rancagua on 3 July 1959, at age 84.
