= Francisco Adriano Caro =

Francisco Caro Rodríguez

8th Mayor of Pichilemu
- In office 24 December 1925 – 22 May 1927
- Preceded by: Luis Barahona Fornés
- Succeeded by: Evaristo Merino Canales de la Cerda

Personal details
- Born: 1870 San Antonio de Petrel, Pichilemu, Chile
- Died: Unknown
- Occupation: Public worker

Francisco Adriano Caro Rodríguez (born 1870) was the eighth mayor of the commune of Pichilemu, Chile, an office which he held between December 1925 and May 1927.

== Biography ==
Caro Rodríguez was born in San Antonio de Petrel, Pichilemu, Chile. His parents were José María Caro Martínez, first mayor of Pichilemu, and Rita Rodríguez Acevedo; the couple had nine children, including Francisco Adriano and José María, who became the first Chilean Cardinal of the Catholic Church.

=== Political career ===
Caro Rodríguez was elected regidor of Pichilemu in 1906 for a three-year term, and was re-elected in 1912, 1918, 1921, and 1924. Following Luis Barahona Fornés' resignation as mayor of Pichilemu in 1925, the Pichilemu City Council elected Francisco Caro to complete his term, which lasted until May 1927.

Eleven days after he took office as mayor of Pichilemu, Caro Rodríguez represented the commune when Pichilemu railway station was inaugurated and the first train arrived, described as a "historically important event" by Washington Saldías of the Pichilemu News.

Political offices
Preceded by Luis Barahona Fornés	Mayor of Pichilemu; 1925–1927	Succeeded by Evaristo Merino Canales de la Cerda
