= Ross Park =

Ross Park may refer to:

- Ross Memorial Park and Alexandre Stadium, a combined multi-purpose outdoor athletic facility in North Franklin Township, Pennsylvania
- Agustín Ross Park, a park founded by Agustín Ross in Pichilemu, Chile
