= San Miguel de las Palmas =

San Miguel de las Palmas is a Chilean village located east of Pichilemu and San Antonio de Petrel, and southwest of Sauce. It is part of the commune of Marchigue.

The village was completely destroyed in January 2017 because of the Great Fire of Colchagua and Cardenal Caro. The old hacienda and chapel of San Miguel, property of the Förster family, was turned into ruins.
