= Trudy Larkin Förster =

American writer

Trudy Larkin Forster (c. 1935 – February 4, 2005) was an American writer, known for her book Los Gatos del Casino, set in Pichilemu, Chile and Agustín Ross Casino.

== Biography ==
Trudy Larkin Forster travelled to Chile in October 1994, and settled in the coastal town of Pichilemu in O'Higgins Region.

In 1999, Larkin Forster published her book Los Gatos del Casino. The book was premiered in the Children's Book Fair in Santiago, Chile during June 1999, and later at the Agustín Ross Art Room (now Agustín Ross Cultural Center) on September 18 of that year.

Larkin Forster died on February 4, 2005, in Pichilemu, and was buried in Pichilemu Cemetery on February 5, according to her own wishes.

== Works ==
- 1999, Los Gatos del Casino
