= Patricio Rey Sommer =

Chilean civil industrial engineer (born 1978)

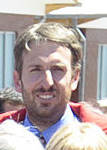
Rey in 2012.

Patricio Alberto Rey Sommer (born 27 March 1978) is a Chilean civil industrial engineer and former intendant of O'Higgins Region.

== Biography ==
He began his studies at Instituto San Fernando in San Fernando. Between 1994 and 1995, he studied at Chillicothe High School in Ohio, United States.

He graduated as a civil industrial engineer with a degree in engineering of informatics at the Pontifical Catholic University of Chile, and in 2003 he obtained a Master of Science in Engineering at the same university.

=== Political career ===
He worked in Serplac of O'Higgins Region, and was SEREMI of Planning, in the same region. On 19 April 2011, he took over Rodrigo Pérez Mackenna's position as intendant of O'Higgins Region.
