= Gustavo Silva Pizarro =

Chilean lawyer, political scientist and 6th Mayor of Pichilemu

6th Mayor of Pichilemu
- In office 4 May 1915 – 4 May 1924
- Preceded by: José Santos Becerra
- Succeeded by: Luis Barahona Fornés

Personal details
- Born: 1884
- Died: 1960 (aged 75–76)
- Education: University of Chile
- Occupation: Public worker

Gustavo Silva Pizarro (1884 — 1960) was a Chilean lawyer, political scientist and the sixth Mayor of the commune of Pichilemu, office which he held for nine years between May 1915 and May 1924.

== Biography ==
Gustavo Silva Pizarro obtained a degree in Law and Political Sciences from the University of Chile on 15 November 1909, subsequently becoming a lawyer.

He married Lucía Silva Henríquez, sister of Catholic Cardinal Raúl Silva Henríquez, with whom he had nine children: Raúl, Lucía, Teresa, Patricio, Enrique, Ricardo, Bernardo (married with Mónica Donoso Flores), Andrés (married with Yolanda Oelkers Robles), and Mercedes (married with Hugo Donoso Donoso).

=== Political career and mayorship of Pichilemu ===
Gustavo Silva Pizarro was elected mayor (primer alcalde) of Pichilemu in 1915 for a three-year term, and re-elected for the 1918–21 and 1921–24 terms. In the 1924 election, Luis Barahona Fornés was elected mayor and Silva Pizarro was relegated to a regidor office for the 1924–1927 term.

During Silva Pizarro's tenure as mayor of Pichilemu, on 2 January 1919, the municipality contracted for the first time a doctor, Joaquín Browne, to provide health services for the commune.

== Works ==
- Estudio sobre la institución jurídica de los retractos (1909), Impr. y Enc. Victoria

Political offices
Preceded by José Santos Becerra	Mayor of Pichilemu; 1915–1924	Succeeded by Luis Barahona Fornés
