= Instituto San Fernando =

- San Fernando, Chile

Information
- Type: High school
- Principal: Ismael Valencia León

Instituto San Fernando (English: San Fernando Institute) is a Chilean high school located in San Fernando, Colchagua Province, Chile.

== Notable alumni ==
- Patricio Rey Sommer, politician, Intendant of O'Higgins Region (2010-2013);
- Jordi Castell, television presenter;
- José Arraño Acevedo, journalist and historian of Pichilemu;
