= José Arraño Acevedo =

Chilean journalist and historian

- Born: José Santos Arraño Acevedo; 14 October 1921; Quebrada del Nuevo Reino, Pichilemu, Chile
- Died: 23 November 2009 (aged 88); Pichilemu, Chile
- Occupations: Journalist, historian, radio host

José Santos Arraño Acevedo (14 October 1921 – 23 November 2009) was a Chilean journalist and historian who worked in several regional newspapers, including El Rancagüino from Rancagua, La Discusión from Chillán, amid others. He also wrote two books on the history of Pichilemu: Pichilemu y Sus Alrededores Turísticos ("Pichilemu and its tourist surroundings") and Hombres y Cosas de Pichilemu ("People and stuff from Pichilemu").

== Biography ==
=== Life ===
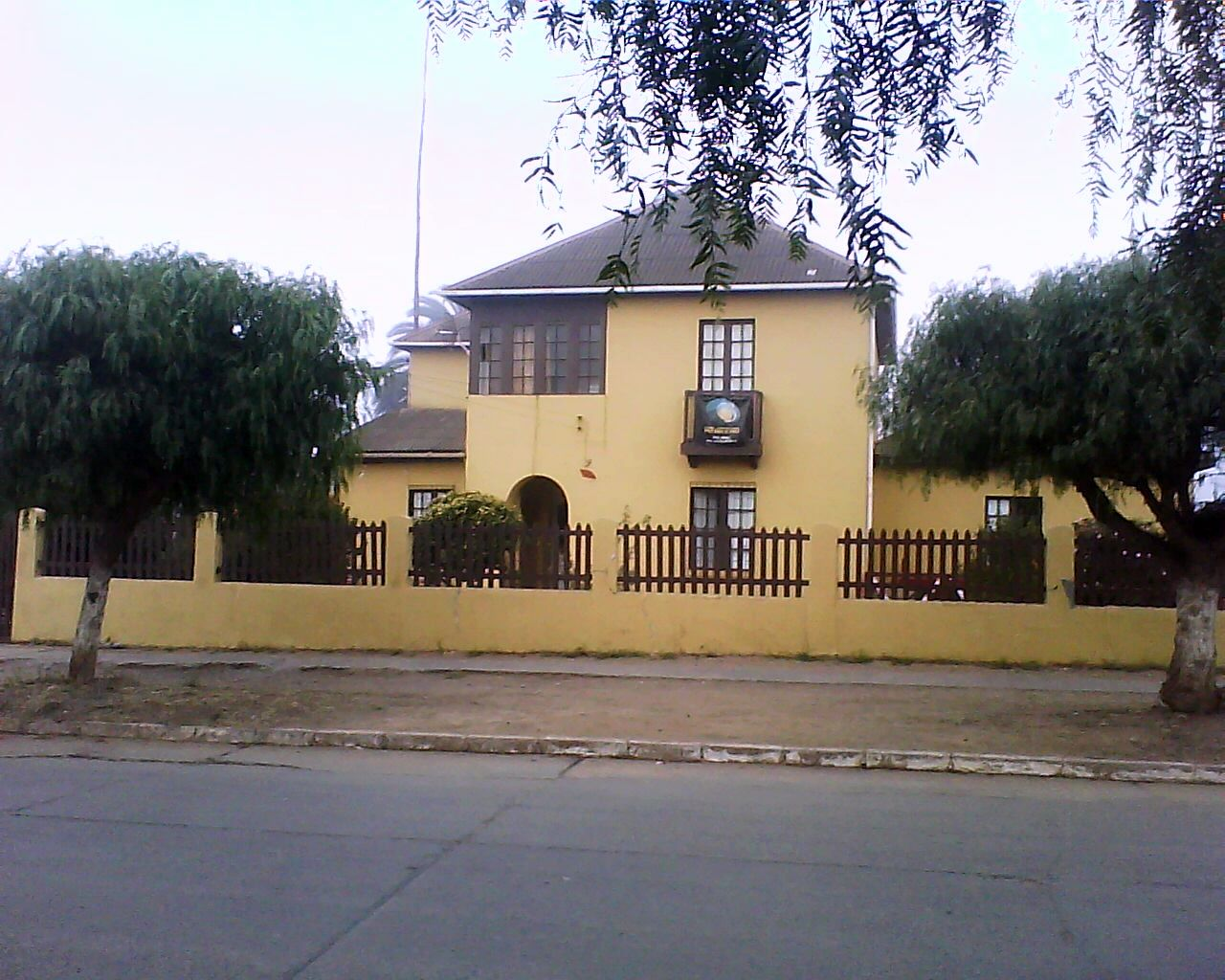
José Arraño Acevedo's house in Pichilemu.

Arraño Acevedo was born on 14 October 1921 in Quebrada del Nuevo Reino, near Pichilemu, then part of Colchagua, Chile. He was one of twelve sons of José Luis Arraño Ortiz and María Soledad Acevedo Caro.

During his childhood he lived in Pichilemu. Arraño studied at the Escuela de los Hermanos Maristas, now Instituto San Fernando, in San Fernando, and at the Pontifical Seminary of Santiago.

He worked as a journalist in newspapers such as Las Últimas Noticias in Santiago, El Rancagüino from Rancagua, El Sur from Concepción, La Prensa from Curicó, La Discusión from Chillán, La Región from San Fernando, amid others. He became a member of the Sociedad de Escritores de Rancagua (Writers' Society of Rancagua) in its foundation year, 1979.

All of his articles were gathered in two books: Pichilemu y sus alrededores turísticos and Hombres y Cosas de Pichilemu. Pichilemu y sus alrededores turísticos was first published by Editora e Imprenta El Promaucae from Pichilemu in 1999. Although Hombres y Cosas de Pichilemu was first announced in 1988 in El Rancagüino, it was first published in September 2003.

During his last years, he hosted a radio programme called La Hora de José Arraño Acevedo, which was broadcast for almost a decade. His phrase "¡Qué lindo es Pichilemu!" ("How beautiful Pichilemu is!") became famous during his time as a radio host.

=== Death ===
On 22 November 2009 he was admitted to the Pichilemu Hospital, and died on 23 November at 14:00 local time, of pneumonia at the age of 88.

His funeral was held in the Inmaculada Concepción Church of Pichilemu, and was later buried on 24 November 2009 in the Cemetery of Pichilemu.

== Works ==
- Pichilemu y sus alrededores turísticos (1999)
- Hombres y cosas de Pichilemu (2003)
