= José María Caro Rodríguez =

First Chilean Cardinal of the Catholic Church

His Eminence José María Caro Rodríguez
- Cardinal; Archbishop of Santiago; Primate of Chile
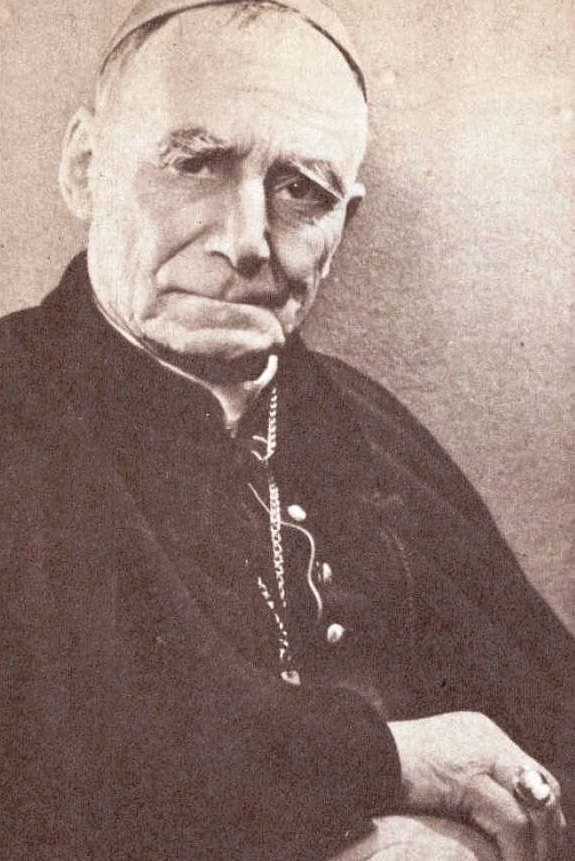
- Church: Roman Catholic Church
- Archdiocese: Santiago
- See: Santiago
- Appointed: 28 August 1939
- Installed: 14 October 1958
- Term ended: 4 December 1958
- Predecessor: Jose Campillo Infante
- Successor: Raúl Silva Henríquez
- Other post: Cardinal-Priest of Santa Maria della Scala (1946-58)
- Previous posts: Vicar Apostolic of Tarapacá (1911–25); Titular Bishop of Mylasa (1911–25); Bishop of La Serena (1925–39); Archbishop of La Serena (1939)

Orders
- Ordination: 20 December 1890 by Giulio Lenti
- Consecration: 28 April 1912 by Enrico Sibilia
- Created cardinal: 18 February 1946 by Pope Pius XII
- Rank: Cardinal-Priest

Personal details
- Born: José María Caro Rodríguez; 23 June 1866 Los Valles, Pichilemu, Chile
- Died: 4 December 1958 (aged 92) Santiago, Chile
- Motto: Virtus nostrum et Deus refugium
- Coat of arms

Styles of Francisco Errázuriz Ossa
- Reference style: His Eminence
- Spoken style: Your Eminence
- Informal style: Cardinal
- See: Santiago de Chile

José María Caro Rodríguez (June 23, 1866 – December 4, 1958) was a Chilean Cardinal of the Roman Catholic Church. He served as Archbishop of Santiago from 1939 until his death, and was elevated to the cardinalate in 1946 by Pope Pius XII.

== Biography ==
=== Early life and ordination ===
José María Caro was born in Los Valles, San Fernando department, in current Pichilemu commune, as the fourth of the nine children of José María Caro Martínez, former Mayor of Pichilemu, and his wife Rita Rodríguez Cornejo. After attending a local school, he entered the seminary in Santiago in 1881. Caro then went to Rome in 1887, studying at the Pontifical Collegio Pio-Latinoamericano and the Pontifical Gregorian University until 1891. Ordained to the priesthood on December 20, 1890, he returned to Chile in October 1891 and then taught preparatory studies and philosophy at the Santiago seminary.

=== Pastoral work ===
Caro carried out his pastoral ministry in several chaplaincies, hospitals and parishes, also serving as pastor of Mamiña from March to December 1899. He returned to the seminary in 1900 as Professor of Theology.

=== Bishop ===
Appointed Apostolic Vicar of Tarapacá on May 6, 1911, Caro was made Titular Bishop of Mylasa in association with the vicariate on January 5, 1912. He received his episcopal consecration on the following April 28 from Archbishop Enrico Sibilia, with Bishops Luis Izquierdo Vargas and Miguel Claro Vásquez serving as co-consecrators, in the metropolitan cathedral of Santiago.

Caro was later named Bishop of La Serena on December 14, 1925, and was advanced to the rank of Archbishop upon his diocese's elevation on May 20, 1939. On August 28 of that same year, Pope Pius XII made him Archbishop of Santiago.

As a bishop, Caro was strongly opposed to the influence of Freemasonry in modern society and wrote several anti-Masonic pamphlets, one of the best known being The Mystery of Freemasonry Unveiled.

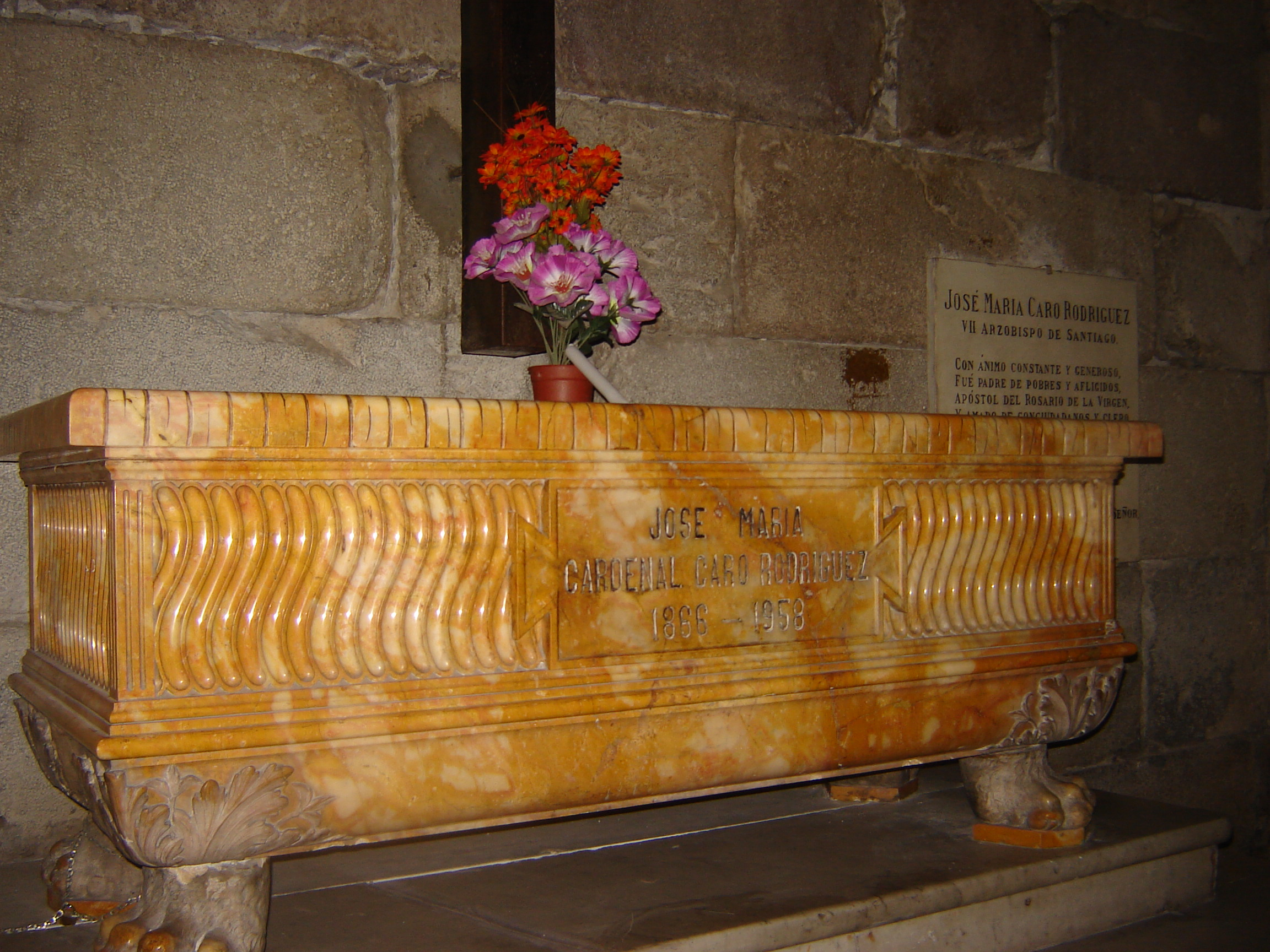
José María Caro's Grave in Santiago Cathedral

=== Cardinal ===
He was created Cardinal Priest of S. Maria della Scala by Pius XII in the consistory of February 18, 1946. Caro, the first Chilean member of the College of Cardinals, served as papal legate to the Chilean Plenary Council on September 8, 1946, tenth National Eucharistic Congress on September 26, 1951, and later to the sixth Interamerican Congress of Catholic Education on August 30, 1956. Before participating in the 1958 papal conclave, Caro attended the first general conference of the Latin American Episcopal Conference in Rio de Janeiro, Brazil, in 1955.

=== Death ===
Caro died in Santiago, at age 92, as the eldest member of the College of Cardinals. He was initially buried in the archiepiscopal crypt of the Santiago Cathedral, but his remains were moved to a funeral chapel at the back of the cathedral's central nave on March 19, 1968.

Catholic Church titles
Preceded by Martín Rucker Sotomayor	Apostolic Vicar of Tarapacá; 1911–1925	Succeeded by Carlos Labbé Márquez
Preceded by Carlos Silva Cotapos	Archbishop of La Serena; 1925–1939	Succeeded by Juan Subercaseaux Errázuriz
Preceded by José Campillo Infante	Archbishop of Santiago de Chile; 1939–1958	Succeeded by Raúl Silva Henríquez
