= Los Restos Indígenas de Pichilemu =

The Indigenous Remains of Pichilemu
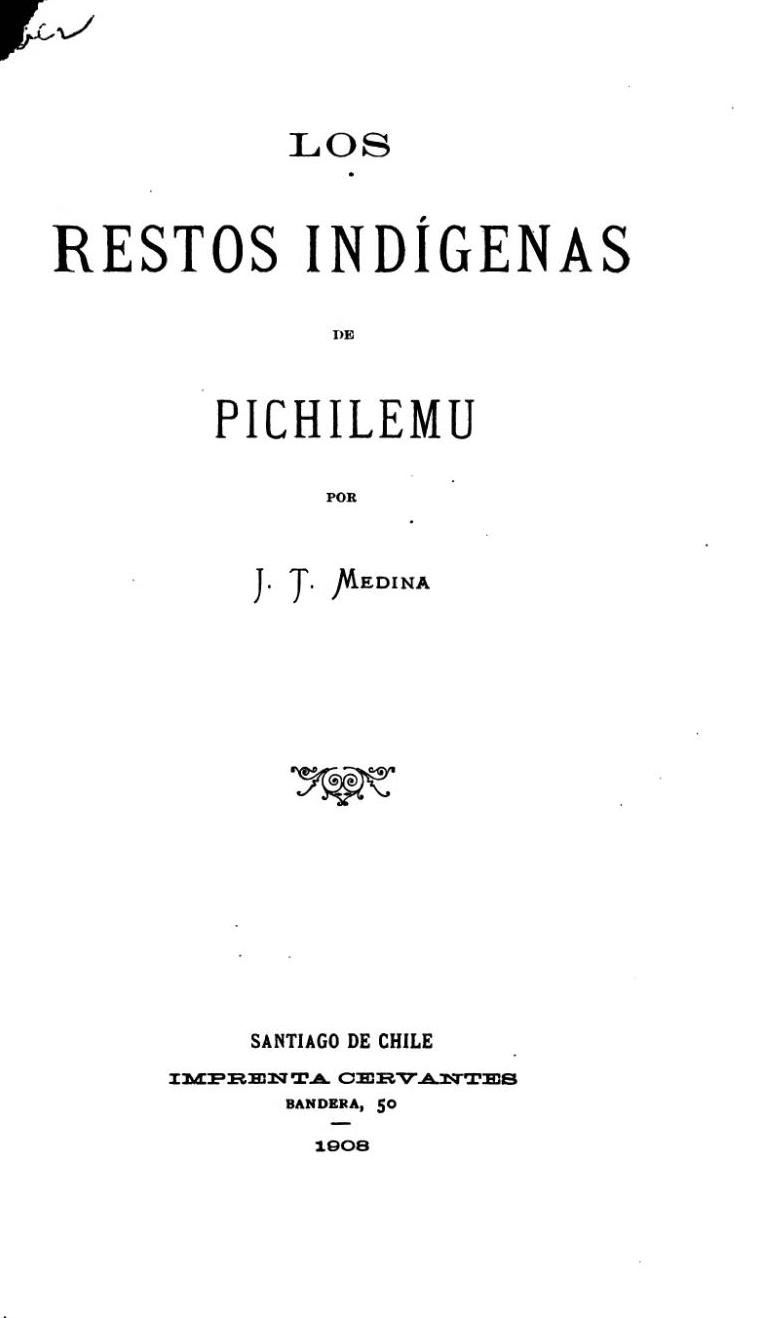
- Author: José Toribio Medina
- Original title: Los Restos Indígenas de Pichilemu
- Language: Spanish
- Subject: History of Pichilemu, History of Chile, Archaeology
- Publisher: Imprenta Cervantes
- Publication date: 1908
- Publication place: Chile
- Pages: 13

Los Restos Indígenas de Pichilemu (The Indigenous Remains of Pichilemu) was a 1908 book published by Chilean historian José Toribio Medina.

Medina presents a report of his examination to indigenous remains found in a Pichilemu grotto (currently named Virgin's Grotto—Spanish: Gruta de la Virgen) by Agustín Ross and Evaristo Merino in 1908. The book contains two sheets, that show some tools that Promoucaes indigenous used.

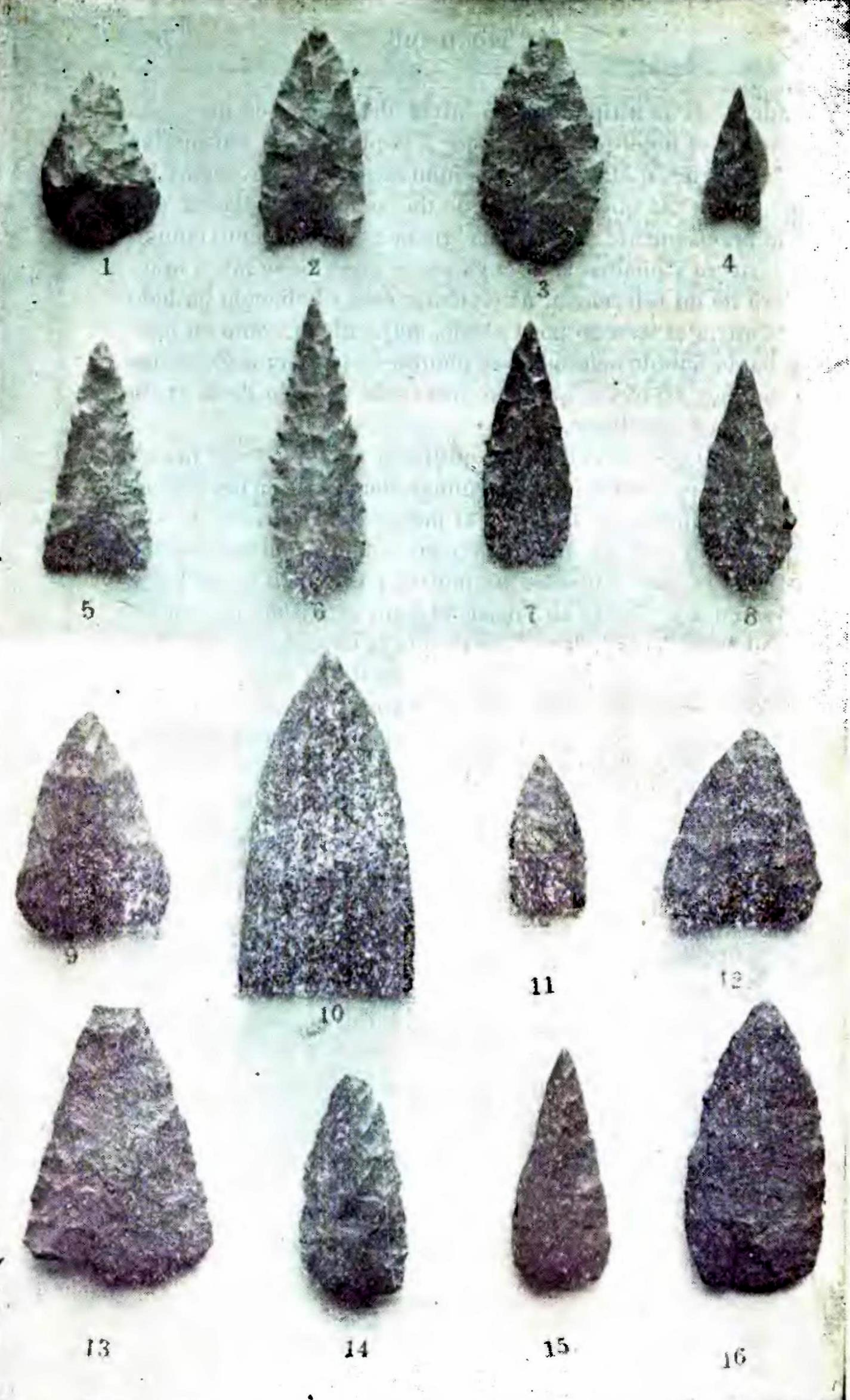
One of Medina's sheet, published originally in the book.
