= Carlos Salas Salas =

3rd Mayor of Pichilemu
- In office 2 May 1909 – 3 May 1912
- Preceded by: Francisco Javier Asalgado
- Succeeded by: Francisco Javier Asalgado

Personal details
- Occupation: Public worker

Carlos Ignacio Salas Salas was the third Mayor of the commune of Pichilemu, office which he held together with Francisco Javier Asalgado between May and September 1909, and following an appeals court rule, he completed his three-year term alone, between September 1909 and May 1912.

== Biography ==
=== Political career ===
Salas Salas ran for the office of primer alcalde of Pichilemu for the 1909–12 term. The elections were held in March 1909, but the results were controversial, and Salas Salas disputed the office with Francisco Javier Asalgado until September, when an appeals court ruled in favor of Salas Salas, who held the mayor office until 1912. He was later elected tercer alcalde for the 1912–15, and 1918–21 terms. Later, in 1924, Salas Salas was elected regidor for the 1924–27 term.

Political offices
Preceded by Francisco Javier Asalgado	Mayor of Pichilemu; 1909–1912	Succeeded by Francisco Javier Asalgado
