= Félix Faustino Outes =

Argentine anthropologist, archeologist and linguist

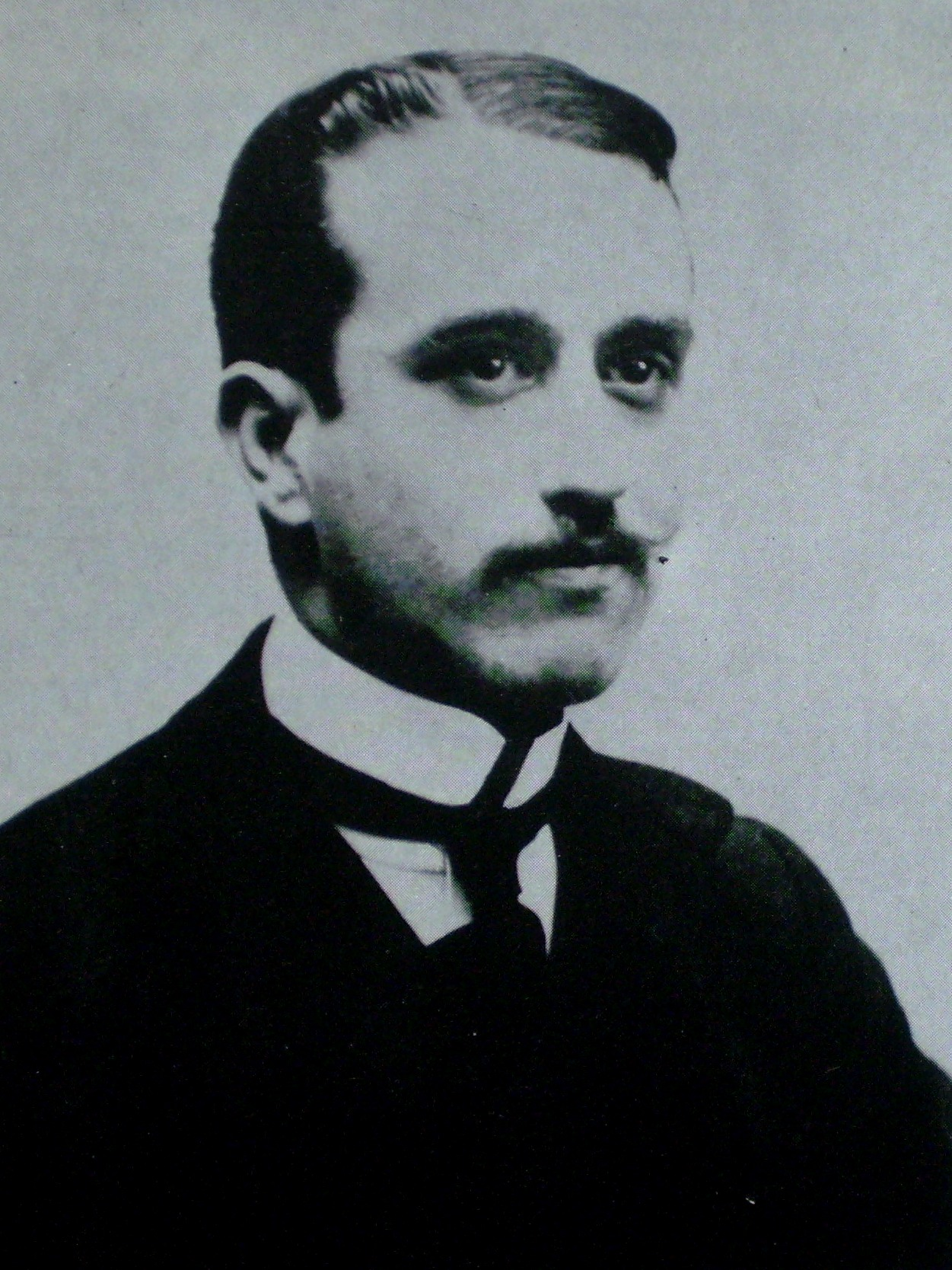
Félix Faustino Outes.

Félix Faustino Outes (July 29, 1878 – 1939) was an Argentine anthropologist, archeologist and linguist.

He was born in Buenos Aires, and was educated at the Colegio Nacional de Buenos Aires and the University of Buenos Aires, graduating with a medical degree in 1899. He showed an early interest in anthropology, and in 1897, published Los Querandíes, a study of the Argentine tribe of the same name. He traveled to France to complete further studies at the École d'Anthropologie, and became a member of the Royal Anthropological Institute and the American Anthropological Association, among others. He joined the Bernardino Rivadavia Natural Sciences Museum in 1903, and worked there until 1911.

Outes taught as Professor of Ethnology, Anthropology and Archeology at the University of La Plata, and most of his seminal publications date from this era.

Los Querandíes, published in 1897.

He joined the University of Buenos Aires as Professor of Human Geography in 1914, and in 1930, was appointed Chair of the Archaeology Department.

He founded the Geographic Investigations Institute in 1917, and directed the Anthropology and Ethnography Museum of Buenos Aires between 1930 and 1938. He was one of the founders of Argentine Society of Anthropology.

Felix Faustino Outes died in 1939, at 61.

== Works ==
- Contribución al estudio de la etnología argentina (1897–98)
- La edad de piedra en la Patagonia (1905)
- Las viejas razas argentinas (1910)
- Los aborígenes del la República Argentina (1910)

Collaborations

- Los restos indígenas de Pichilemu by José Toribio Medina (1908)
