= Laguna Petrel =

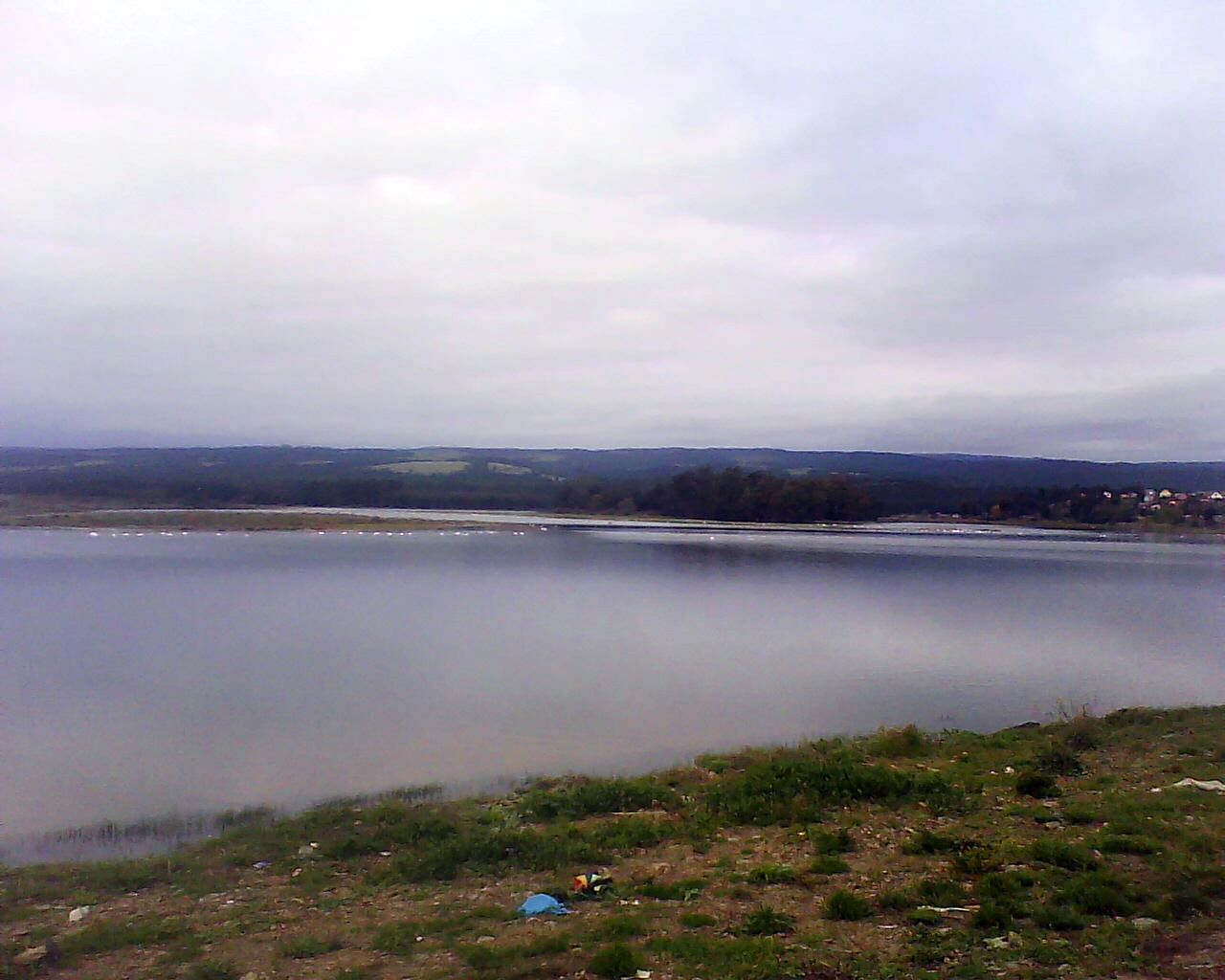
- Petrel Lagoon, on October 4, 2010.

- Location within Chile
- Coordinates: 34°22′47.35″S 71°59′59.75″W
- Basin countries: Chile
- Surface elevation: 0 feet (0 m)

Petrel Lagoon (Spanish: Laguna de Petrel or Laguna Petrel) is a coastal lagoon located in Pichilemu beach, Chile, in front of Pichilemu railway station.

It contains a high percentage of sea water, and it was formerly one of the main attractions of Pichilemu.

It is named after the hacienda San Antonio de Petrel, located nearby Pichilemu.
