= José Santos Becerra =

5th Mayor of Pichilemu
- In office 22 September 1912 – 2 May 1915
- Preceded by: Francisco Javier Asalgado
- Succeeded by: Gustavo Silva Pizarro

Personal details
- Occupation: Public worker

José Santos Becerra was the fifth Mayor of the commune of Pichilemu, office which he held between September 1912 and May 1915.

== Biography ==
=== Political career ===
Becerra was a member of the Pichilemu City Council as regidor for three, three-year-long terms, between 1897 and 1906. In 1906, he was elected segundo alcalde of Pichilemu for the 1906–09 term, and was re-elected for the 1912–1915 term. However, following Francisco Javier Asalgado's resignation as mayor in September 1912, he became the fifth primer alcalde (mayor) of Pichilemu, an office which he held for the rest of the term, until 1915. He was succeeded by Gustavo Silva Pizarro for the 1915–18 term.

In April 1913, he sent a note to the Ministry of Railways urging the government to fasten the construction of the Alcones-Pichilemu railway.

Political offices
Preceded by Francisco Javier Asalgado	Mayor of Pichilemu; 1912–1915	Succeeded by Gustavo Silva Pizarro
