= Francisco Javier Asalgado =

Chilean politician

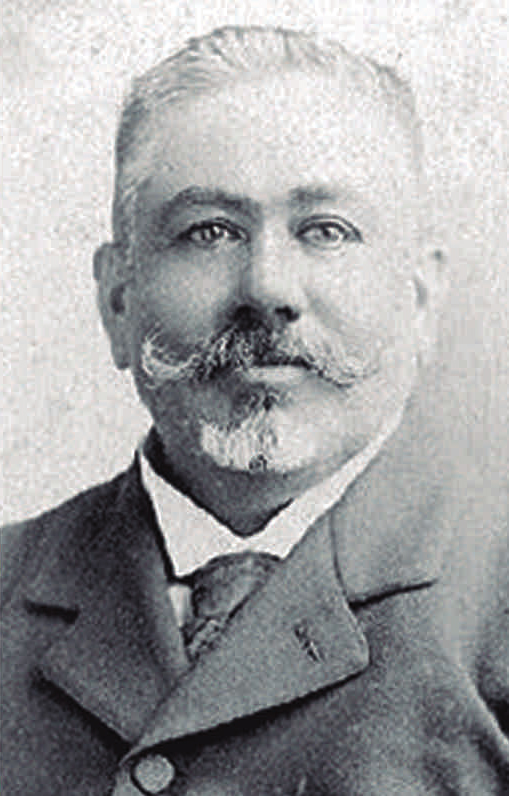

4th Mayor of Pichilemu
- In office 5 May 1912 – 22 September 1912
- Preceded by: Carlos I. Salas Salas
- Succeeded by: José Santos Becerra

2nd Mayor of Pichilemu
- In office 7 May 1905 – 3 September 1909
- Preceded by: José María Caro Martínez
- Succeeded by: Carlos I. Salas Salas

Personal details
- Occupation: Public worker

Francisco Javier Asalgado was a Chilean politician. He was the second and fourth mayor of the commune of Pichilemu, an office which he held between May 1905 and September 1909, and between May and September 1912.

== Biography ==
=== Political career ===
In 1900, Francisco Javier Asalgado was elected segundo alcalde of Pichilemu, as José María Caro Martínez began his third term as mayor (primer alcalde) of the commune. He was re-elected segundo alcalde of the commune in 1903. However, on 7 May 1905, just one year short of the end of his term, José María Caro Martínez resigned as mayor and decided to complete his term only as a regidor. In spite of this, the city council named Francisco Javier Asalgado as the acting primer alcalde. He served the remainder of Caro Martínez's term, which lasted until the next year. He was elected primer alcalde in the election of 1906.

He ran again for primer alcalde of Pichilemu in 1909. The results of the March 1909 municipal election were controversial, with Francisco Javier Asalgado and Carlos Salas Salas disputing the primer alcalde office. However, an appeals court ruled in favor of Salas in September that year. After Salas' term was completed, he once again ran for the office of primer alcalde, and was elected. He began his second term on 5 May 1912 but decided to retire the next month. His resignation became effective on 22 September 1912. José Santos Becerra, segundo alcalde was named as acting primer alcalde.

Political offices
Preceded by José María Caro Martínez; Carlos Salas Salas	Mayor of Pichilemu; 1905–1909; 1912	Succeeded by Carlos Salas Salas; José Santos Becerra
