= Evaristo Merino =

Evaristo Merino Canales
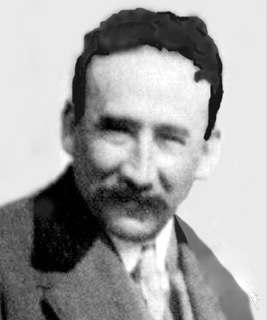

9th Mayor of Pichilemu
- In office 22 May 1927 – 14 May 1928
- President: Carlos Ibáñez del Campo
- Preceded by: Francisco Adriano Caro Rodríguez
- Succeeded by: José Camilo Silva

Personal details
- Born: 1868 Curicó, Chile
- Died: 27 August 1930 (aged 61–62) Curicó, Chile
- Occupation: Public worker

Evaristo Merino Canales de la Cerda (died 27 August 1930) was the ninth Mayor of the commune of Pichilemu, office which he held between May 1927 and May 1928, although the latter date is disputed.

== Biography ==
=== Personal life and early work ===
Evaristo Merino Canales, son of Evaristo Merino and Rita Canales married Rosa Silva Valenzuela on 8 June 1896, with whom he had ten children: Antonieta, Raquel, Eduardo, Jorge, Adolfo, Rosa, Evaristo, Marcial, Modesto, and Sergio. In March 1900, he began working as administrator of Agustín Ross Edwards' resort in Pichilemu, and did so until the death of Ross in October 1926.

=== Mayor of Pichilemu and death ===
He was appointed mayor of the junta de vecinos (neighbors' council) of Pichilemu by decree of the president on 15 May 1927. Local historian and journalist José Arraño Acevedo stated that Merino's mayorship lasted until his resignation in February 1928, as he wanted to "move definitely to his native Curicó", while Antonio Saldías asserts Merino's mayorship lasted until 14 May 1928.

On 27 August 1930, just two years and a half since he left Pichilemu, he died in Curicó, and his ashes were buried at the local cemetery, in a mausoleum which he shares with his wife, who died in August 1925.

Political offices
Preceded by Francisco Adriano Caro Rodríguez	Mayor of Pichilemu; 1927–1928	Succeeded by José Camilo Silva
