= Hotel Ross =

- Gran Hotel Pichilemu
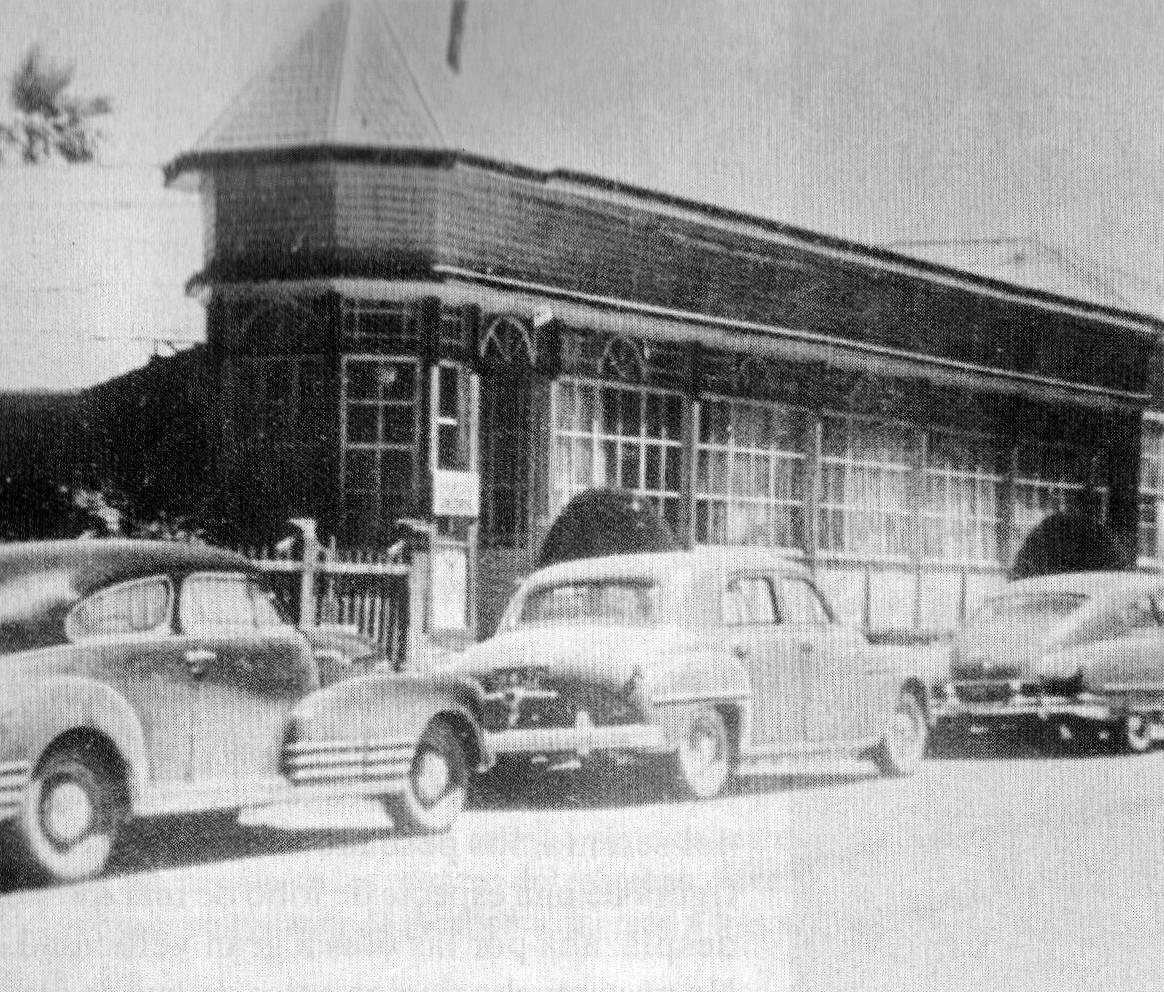
- Ross Hotel, at that times Great Hotel Pichilemu, in 1932.
- Alternative names: Hotel Agustín Ross

General information
- Type: Hotel
- Location: Pichilemu, Chile, Agustín Ross avenue, in front of Agustín Ross Park.
- Construction started: 1885
- Renovated: December 1987

Technical details
- Floor count: 1

Design and construction
- Architect: Agustín Ross Edwards

The Hotel Ross is an old hotel in the Chilean city of Pichilemu. It was created by Agustín Ross Edwards in 1885, and remodeled in December 1987.

The park is located on Agustín Ross Avenue, in front of the old Ross Casino. The hotel was originally named Great Hotel Pichilemu (Spanish: Gran Hotel Pichilemu). The once grand Ross Hotel was constructed at the same time. Although the hotel, one of the oldest in Chile, is still partially open to guests, it is in a high state of disrepair.

When he came here, there was nothing. Just a pair of houses, or less. He gave a form to the town, he gave it European looks. Look these balustrades which decorate the slope or the ones which border the park, are the same which Mr. Agustin saw on Biarritz.

— Jaime Parra, current administrator of the Ross Hotel.

It is a National Monument of Chile, as part of the Sector de Pichilemu typical zone.

== See also ==
- Agustín Ross Cultural Center
- Agustín Ross Park
