= Luis Baraona Fornés =

Chilean politician

Deputy for the 10th Departmental Constituency of Caupolicán, San Vicente, and San Fernando
- In office 1926–1930

7th Mayor of Pichilemu
- In office 4 May 1924 – 24 December 1925
- Preceded by: Gustavo Silva Pizarro
- Succeeded by: Francisco Adriano Caro Rodríguez

Personal details
- Party: Conservative Party
- Spouse: Constanza Ortúzar Fornés

Luis Antonio Baraona Fornés was a Chilean politician, who served as the seventh Mayor of Pichilemu between 1924 and 1925, and as a Deputy for the 10th Departmental Constituency of Caupolicán, San Vicente, and San Fernando departments between 1926 and 1930.

== Biography ==
Luis Antonio Baraona Fornés was one of the children of Luis Antonio Baraona Calvo and Concepción Fornés García Reyes. Baraona Fornés married in Santiago on 25 December 1911 with Constanza Ortúzar Fornés; they had children.

He was a member of the Conservative Party of Chile. He was elected Mayor of Pichilemu in 1924, and held the position between 4 May of that year and 24 December 1925, when he resigned to run as candidate for deputy of the 10th Departmental Constituency of Caupolicán, San Vicente, and San Fernando. He was eventually elected deputy for the aforementioned departmental constituency, and held the position between 1926 and 1930; during his time as a member of the Chilean Chamber of Deputies he was a member of the Permanent Commission of Budgets and Objected Decrees.

Political offices
Preceded by Gustavo Silva Pizarro	Mayor of Pichilemu; 1924–1925	Succeeded by Francisco Adriano Caro Rodríguez
