= El Rancagüino =

- El Diario de la Región de O'Higgins ("The Daily of O'Higgins Region")

- Front page of El Rancagüino's 2 September 2013 edition.
- Type: Daily newspaper
- Format: Tabloid
- Owner(s): Sociedad Informativa Regional S.A.
- Founder(s): Miguel González Navarro
- Founded: August 15, 1915
- Language: Spanish
- Headquarters: Rancagua, O'Higgins Region, Chile
- Website: www.elrancaguino.cl

El Rancagüino is a Chilean newspaper, based on Rancagua. It was founded on 16 August 1915 under the name of La Semana ("The Week"). It is distributed in the thirty-three communes of O'Higgins Region. The newspaper is member of the National Press Association, and an active member of the Inter-American Press Society.
