= San Fernando Department (Chile) =

San Fernando Department Departamento de San Fernando
- Department of Chile
- Country: Chile
- Former province: Colchagua
- Capital: San Fernando
- Communes: List of 9: San Fernando; Roma; Chimbarongo; Nancagua; Palmilla; Placilla; Matanzas; La Estrella; Pichilemu
- Time zone: UTC-4 (CLT)
  - Summer (DST): UTC-3 (CLST)

The San Fernando Department (Spanish: Departamento de San Fernando) was a Chilean department. In 1891, its capital was San Fernando, and comprised the communes of Roma, Chimbarongo, Nancagua, Palmilla, Placilla, Matanzas, La Estrella, and Pichilemu.
