= Quebrada del Nuevo Reino =

- Village
- Quebrada del Nuevo Reino
- Country: Chile
- Region: (O'Higgins Region) O'Higgins
- Province: (Cardenal Caro Province) Cardenal Caro
- Commune: Pichilemu

Quebrada del Nuevo Reino (Spanish for brook of the new kingdom, pronounced [keˈβɾaða ðel ˈnweβo ˈrejno]) is a Chilean village located in Pichilemu, Cardenal Caro Province.
