= Agustín Ross Balcony =

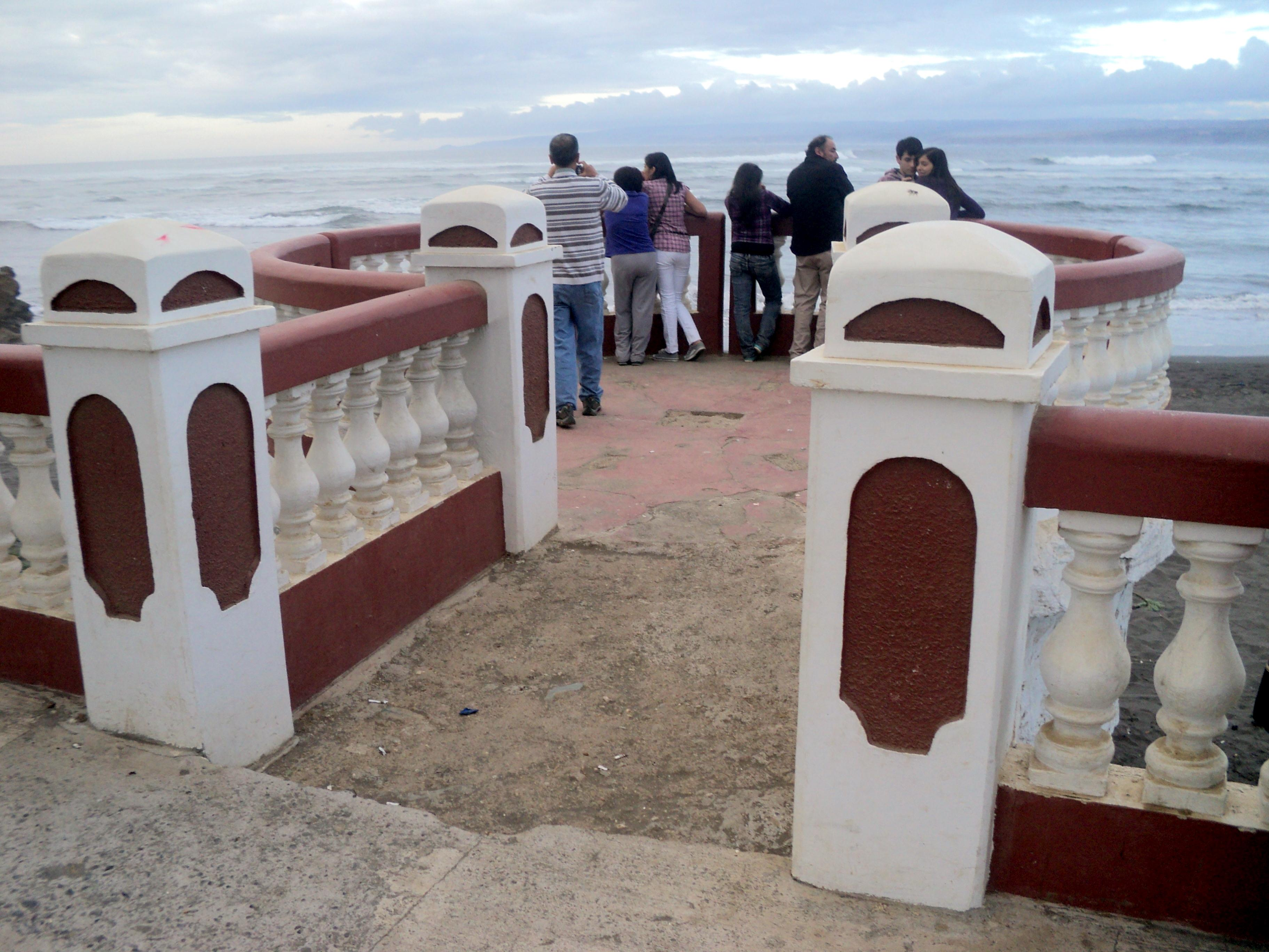
The Mirador in March 2011.

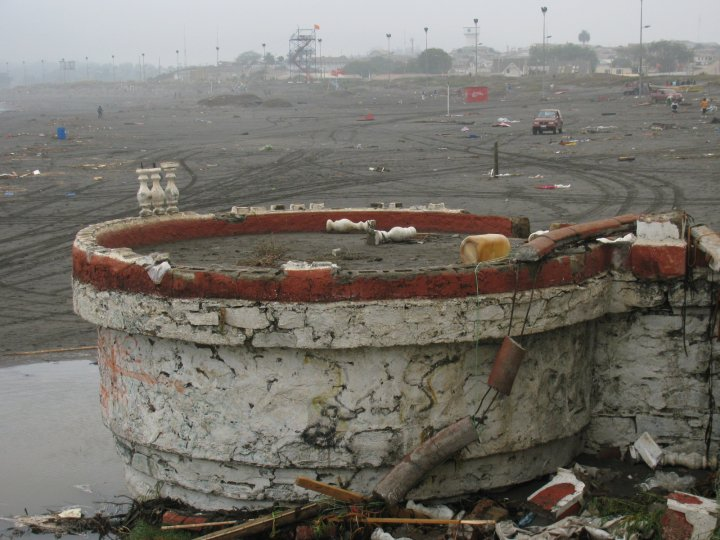
The Agustín Ross Balcony after the 2010 Chile earthquake and tsunami.

The Ross Balcony (Spanish: Mirador de Agustín Ross, also known as Mirador el Infiernillo) is a balcony constructed by Agustín Ross Edwards in 1910. It is located over rocks in the southern part of the beach of Pichilemu, in the Paseo de la Juventud (Spanish: Youthfulness Walk). The waves came up to the level of the balcony until the 1960 Valdivia earthquake.

Agustín Ross designed it with the purpose of viewing the sea. He constructed groceries near the balcony, which became one of the most important places during the rise of the city.
