= Agustín Ross =

Chilean politician, diplomat and banker

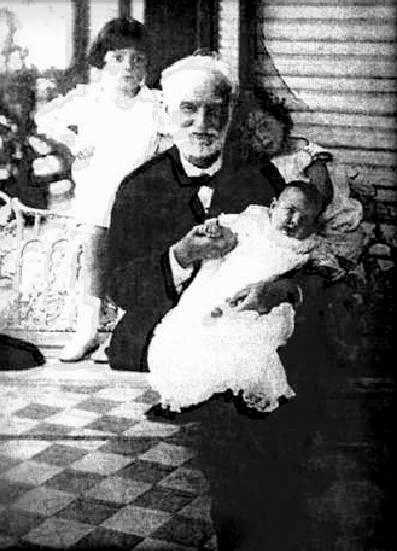
- Agustín Ross circa 1915 in Pichilemu.

Personal details
- Born: February 5, 1844 La Serena, Chile
- Died: October 20, 1926 (aged 82) Viña del Mar, Chile
- Party: National Party of Chile
- Spouse: Susana De Ferari
- Profession: Architect, politician, diplomat

Agustín Ross Edwards (February 5, 1844 – October 20, 1926) was a Chilean politician, diplomat, and banker. He was son of David Ross and Carmen Edwards Ossandon; both were of British ancestry. He was married to Susana De Ferari.

== Biography ==
Ross studied at the Carlos Black and Simon Kerr School in La Serena. He studied at the Queen Street Institution in Scotland between 1856 and 1860. He participated in the trades of the bank of the Edwards family. He was private agent in London of the Government Junta of Iquique in 1891. He was plenipotentiary minister in Great Britain in February 1892.

Ross moved to Pichilemu around 1890 and bought some land in the town. In San Fernando, in September 1885, he bought some property from Francisco Torrealba, on a site that was located at the Pichilemu beach. He constructed the Ross Hotel with a European-style design, assigning Evaristo Merino as its administrator. He promoted Pichilemu in cities such as Santiago de Chile. He later constructed the Ross Casino and the Ross Park. They used materials such as stone from Italy, Oregon pine from the United States, and Portland cement. A Chilean chronicler quoted:

Mr. Agustín Ross throws away his money in Pichilemu, [a place] that will soon become a complete port, just like it is currently, the Chilean Biarritz.

— Quote from José Arraño Acevedo's book, Hombres y Cosas de Pichilemu (2003).

Ross was a militant of the National Party of Chile. He was senator of the Coquimbo Province between 1897 and 1903.

Ross died on October 26, 1926, in Viña del Mar. Some of his property was left to the Municipality of Pichilemu in his will, including forest, terraces, and the park, with the condition that they should be attended to in a worthy manner.

== See also ==
- Ross Balcony
