= Parque Ross =

Agustín Ross Park
- Parque Agustín Ross
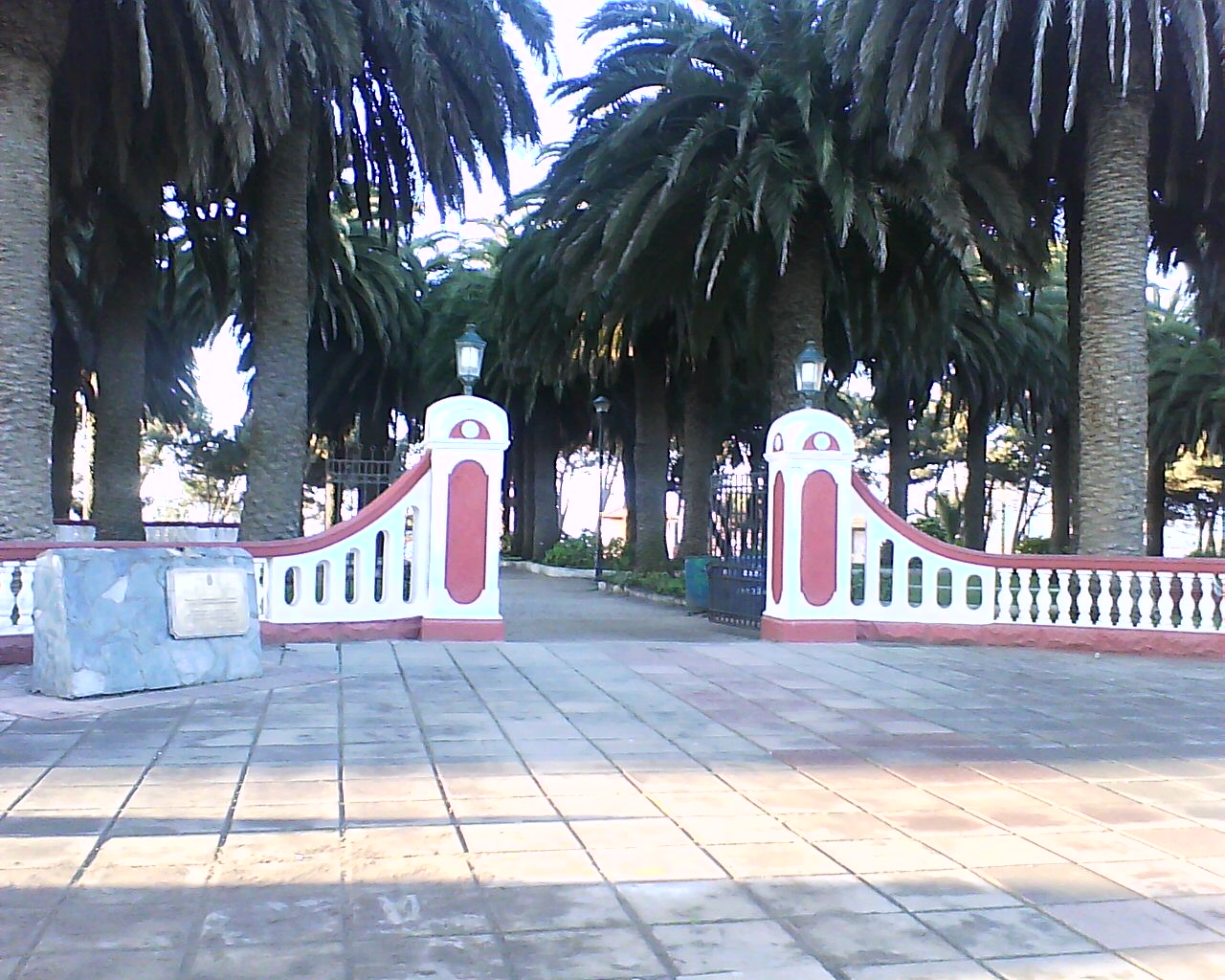
- Agustín Ross Park entrance in June 2010.

- Location within Pichilemu

General information
- Type: Park
- Location: Pichilemu, Chile, Av. Agustín Ross, in front of the Agustín Ross Hotel
- Coordinates: 34°23′03.09″S 72°00′40.62″W
- Owner: Agustín Ross (until the 1930s); Pichilemu Municipality (since the 1930s)

Design and construction
- Architect: Agustín Ross Edwards

Agustín Ross Park (Spanish: Parque Agustín Ross) is a park located in the Agustín Ross Avenue, in front of the old Ross Casino, in Pichilemu. It is a National Monument of Chile.

The original park contains 100-year-old native Canary Island date palms (Phoenix canariensis) and many green spaces. Both the park and the former casino were named National Monuments on February 25, 1988, and the majority of the houses situated in the park are private homes. It has become an attractive walking destination, following its restoration.

The Park was severely damaged after the 2010 Pichilemu earthquake, with all of the balustrades surrounding the park being destroyed.
