= Estación Pichilemu =

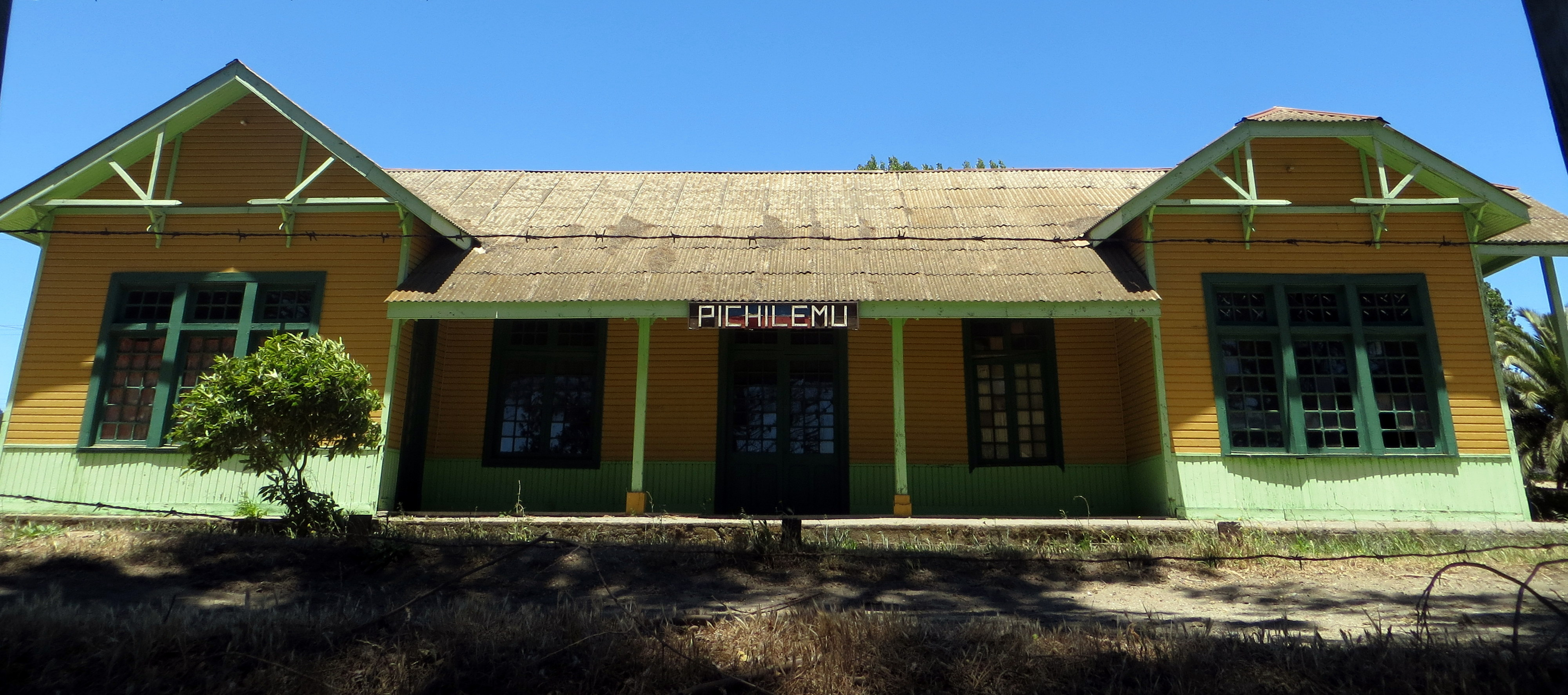
- Pichilemu railway station in 2013.

- Location within Pichilemu
- Alternative names: Ex Estación de Ferrocarriles

General information
- Type: Railway station
- Location: Pichilemu, Chile, Aníbal Pinto avenue.
- Coordinates: 34°23′08.42″S 72°00′09.30″W
- Construction started: c. 1925
- Owner: Municipality of Pichilemu

Technical details
- Floor count: 1

Estación Pichilemu, also known as the Estación de Ferrocarriles de Pichilemu (Spanish: Railway station of Pichilemu) was a railway station in Pichilemu, Chile. It is a wood construction dated c. 1925, located in front of the Petrel Lake, near Daniel Ortúzar Avenue (34°23′08.42″S 72°00′09.30″W). It remained in operation until the 1990s, and became a National Monument on 16 September 1994. It has since become an arts and culture center, and tourism information office. It exhibits decorative and practical objects from the 1920s, and features many old suits.

== History ==
357 kilometres (222 mi) of railway line were constructed in the O'Higgins Region, but only 161 kilometres (100 mi) still exists. The 119 kilometres (74 mi) San Fernando–Pichilemu section was constructed over a period of 57 years between 1869 and 1926. Passenger services operated on the line until 1986 and freight services were operational until 1995.

In 2006, the Peralillo–Pichilemu section of the railway was removed completely.
