= Hacienda San Antonio de Petrel =

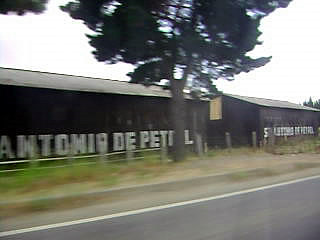
Barracks of the old San Antonio de Petrel hacienda.

Hacienda San Antonio de Petrel was a Chilean hacienda located between Topocalma and Nilahue, in current Pichilemu, O'Higgins Region.

It was created in 1611 by Bartolomé de Rojas y Puebla, who owned the terrains, and who later bought more lands nearby. San Antonio de Petrel's main activity that century was the animal breeding.

In the following years, San Antonio de Petrel's income was generated by the production of leather, jerky, soles, tallow, cordovan, and animal breeding.

San Antonio de Petrel is located 18 kilometres (11 mi) east of Pichilemu. Its current owner is Francisco Javier Errázuriz Talavera.
