= San Antonio de Petrel =

Coordinates: 34°22′S 71°50′W

- Village
- San Antonio de Petrel
- Interactive map of San Antonio de Petrel
- Country: Chile
- Region: O'Higgins
- Province: Cardenal Caro
- Commune: Pichilemu

Area
  - Total: 147.4 km^{2} (56.9 sq mi)

Population (2002)
  - Total: 371
  - Density: 2.51/km^{2} (6.5/sq mi)

San Antonio de Petrel (Spanish for St. Anthony of Petrel, pronounced [san anˈtonjo ðe peˈtɾel]) is a small Chilean village located near the hacienda of the same name, in Pichilemu. It is located 18 kilometres (11 mi) east of Pichilemu. According to the 2002 census, the population of San Antonio de Petrel comprised 371 people, and 94 households.
