= José María Hurtado Ruiz-Tagle =

Chilean politician

José María Hurtado
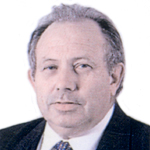

Member of the Chamber of Deputies
- In office 11 March 1990 – 11 March 1998
- Preceded by: District created
- Succeeded by: María Victoria Ovalle
- Constituency: 35th District (Chépica, La Estrella, Litueche, Lolol, Marchigüe, Nancagua, Navidad, Palmilla, Paredones, Peralillo, Pichilemu, Placilla, Pumanque and Santa Cruz)

Mayor of Palmilla
- In office 1986–1989
- President: Augusto Pinochet

Personal details
- Born: 5 March 1945 Palmilla, Chile
- Died: 24 September 2018 (aged 73) Santiago, Chile
- Party: Renovación Nacional
- Education: Colegio San Ignacio
- Alma mater: Pontifical Catholic University of Valparaíso (BA)
- Profession: Fishing engineer

José María Hurtado Ruiz-Tagle (5 March 1945 – 24 September 2018) was a Chilean politician; member of the National Renewal (RN) party, Hurtado Ruiz-Tagle was a member of the Chamber of Deputies of Chile between 1990 and 1998.

== Biography ==
José María Hurtado Ruiz-Tagle was born on March 5, 1945, in Santiago de Chile, Santiago Metropolitan Region, Chile. He completed his secondary studies at Colegio San Ignacio, and he later graduated as Performance Engineer in Fisheries from the School of Fisheries & Food of the Catholic University of Valparaíso (PUCV).

In 1986, he was appointed mayor of Palmilla, which is according to the Library of the National Congress of Chile, the commune where he resides. He left the office in 1989 to become a candidate for deputy in the forthcoming elections, representing the National Renewal party; he was eventually elected for the District #32 of Santa Cruz and Pichilemu, for a term which lasted between 1990 and 1994. He was re-elected for another term, between 1994 and 1998.

Hurtado Ruiz-Tagle is a member of Sociedad Agrícola Los Maquis Ltda., member of the Rodeo Club of Santa Cruz (also being president of the organization), and executive of PRODUCAM Ltda. He also was vice president of the National Federation of Chilean Rodeo.
