= Pichilemu =

- City
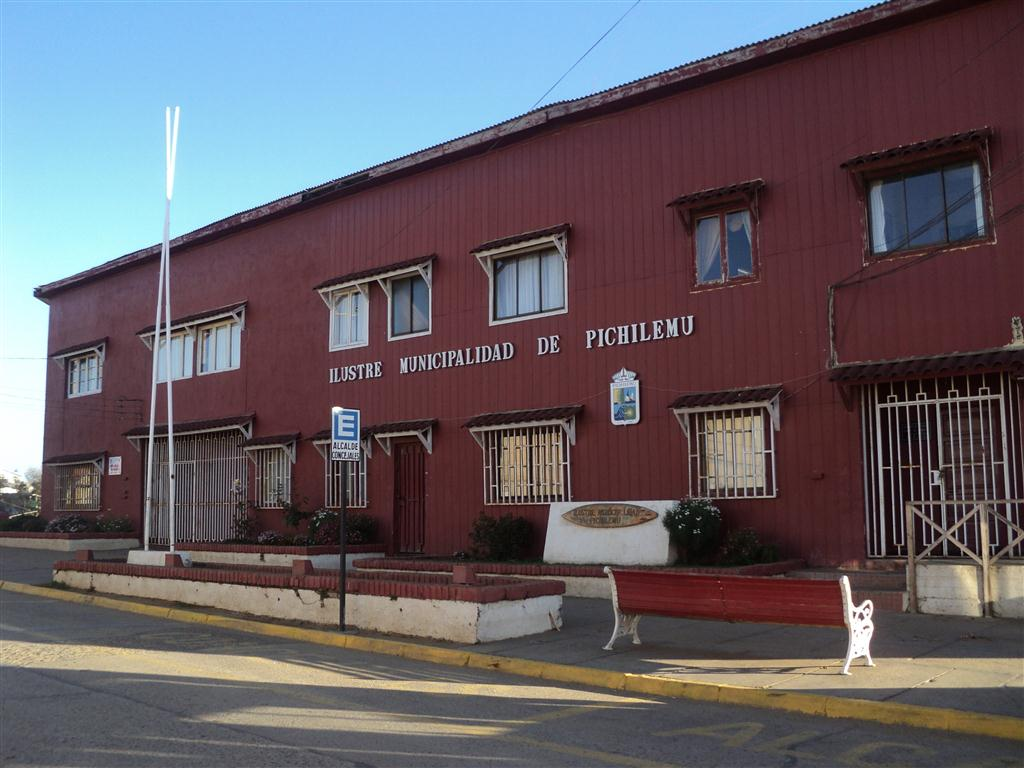
- The Pichilemu city hall, as seen in April 2011

- Flag Coat of arms Logo
- Nickname: Surf Capital (Capital del Surf)
- Location of the Pichilemu commune in O'Higgins Region

- Location within Chile
- Coordinates: 34.385°S 72.005°W
- Country: Chile
- Region: O'Higgins
- Province: Cardenal Caro
- Settled: 24 January 1544
- Commune created: 22 December 1891

Government
  - Mayor: Roberto Córdova Carreño (2024-)
  - City Council: Councilors: Marcelo Cabrera Martínez; Sofía Yávar Ramírez; Aníbal Galarce Sandoval; Pablo Canales Saravia; José Luis Cabrera Jorquera; Álvaro Álvarez Pérez

Area
  - Total: 749.1 km^{2} (289.2 sq mi)
- Elevation: 27 m (89 ft)

Population (2024 census)
  - Total: 19,847
  - Density: 26.49/km^{2} (68.62/sq mi)
- Demonym: Pichilemino/Pichilemina
- Time zone: UTC-4 (Chile Time (CLT))
  - Summer (DST): UTC-3 (Chile Summer Time (CLST))
- ZIP codes: 3220478
- Area code: (+56) 72
- Website: www.pichilemu.cl

Pichilemu (Mapudungun: Small forest, pronounced [pitʃiˈlemu]), originally known as Pichilemo, is a beach resort city and commune in central Chile, and capital of Cardenal Caro Province in the O'Higgins Region. The commune comprises an urban centre and twenty-two villages, including Ciruelos, Cáhuil, and Cardonal de Panilonco. It is located southwest of Santiago. Pichilemu had nearly 20,000 residents as of 2024.

The Pichilemu area was long populated by the indigenous Promaucaes. European-Chilean development began in the mid-sixteenth century, as conquistador Pedro de Valdivia gave Juan Gómez de Almagro the Topocalma encomienda (which included the current territory of Pichilemu) in January 1541. Pichilemu was established as a subdelegation on 16 August 1867, and later as an "autonomous commune" on 22 December 1891, by decree of the President Jorge Montt and Interior Minister Manuel José Irarrázabal. Agustín Ross Edwards, a Chilean politician and member of the Ross Edwards family, planned to develop it as a beach resort on the Pacific Ocean for upper-class Chileans.

Pichilemu is home to five of the National Monuments of Chile: Agustín Ross Cultural Centre and Park; the wooden railway station, Estación Pichilemu; El Árbol tunnel; and the Caballo de Agua. Part of the city was declared a Zona Típica ("Traditional Area" or "Heritage Site") by the National Monuments Council, in 2004.

The city is part of District No. 16 and is in the senatorial constituency of O'Higgins Region electoral division. Pichilemu is home to the main beach in O'Higgins Region. It is a tourist destination for surfing, windsurfing and funboarding.

Tourism is the main industry of the city, but forestry and handicrafts are also important. Pichilemu has many expansive dark sand beaches. Several surf championships take place in the city each year at Punta de Lobos.

== History ==
Pichilemu was inhabited by Promaucaes, a pre-Columbian tribal group, until the Spanish conquest of Chile. They were hunter-gatherers and fishermen who lived primarily along the Cachapoal and Maule rivers. The remaining Promaucaes were assimilated into Chilean society through a process of hispanicisation and mestisation after the conquest of Chile.

Aureliano Oyarzún, professor of pathology at University of Chile, investigated pre-Ceramic middens from Pichilemu and Cahuil. His book Crónicas de Pichilemu–Cáhuil (Chronicles of Pichilemu–Cáhuil) was published posthumously, in 1957. Tomás Guevara published two volumes of Historia de Chile, Chile Prehispánico (History of Chile, Pre-Hispanic Chile) in 1929, which discusses the indigenous centre of Apalta, the Pichilemu middens, the Malloa petroglyphs, a stone cup from Nancagua, and pottery finds in Peralillo.

José Toribio Medina (1852–1930), who was a writer and historiographer, spent most of his life in Colchagua Province, and completed his first archeological investigations in Pichilemu. In 1908, he published Los Restos Indígenas de Pichilemu (English: The Indigenous Remains of Pichilemu), in which he stated that the Indians that were inhabiting Pichilemu when the Spaniards arrived at Chile were Promaucaes, part of the Topocalma encomienda, given on 24 January 1544, by Pedro de Valdivia to Juan Gómez de Almagro, therefore establishing Pichilemu.

During the colonial and Republican periods, agriculture was promoted by the government. Many Chilean haciendas (estates) were successful during this time, including the Pichileminian Hacienda San Antonio de Petrel. Part of the land where San Antonio de Petrel was created was given by the Captaincy General of Chile to Bartolomé de Rojas y Puebla in 1611, who later acquired more lands in order to establish it. San Antonio de Petrel produced leather, jerky, soles, tallow, and cordovan, as well as other products which would later be exported to Peru, or sold in Santiago and Valparaíso. San Antonio de Petrel was bordered by properties of Laureano Gaete and Ninfa Vargas, and Pedro Pavez Polanco.

The area around Pichilemu was densely populated, especially in Cáhuil, where there are salt deposits that were exploited by natives. Pichilemu has had censuses taken since the 17th century.

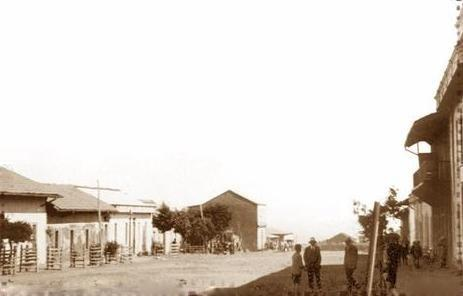
Daniel Ortúzar Avenue, in 1925.

In 1872, President of Chile Aníbal Pinto commissioned the corvette captain Francisco Vidal Gormaz to perform a survey of the coast between Tumán Creek and Boca del Mataquito. He concluded that Pichilemu was the best place to construct a ferry. The family of Daniel Ortúzar, inheritors of the hacienda San Antonio de Petrel, constructed a dock in 1875, which served as a fishing port for a few years, and would be decreed as a "minor dock" by President José Manuel Balmaceda in 1887. Homes were built along the dock on what currently is the Daniel Ortúzar Avenue (Avenida Daniel Ortúzar). The name Pichilemu comes from the Mapudungún words pichi (little) and lemu (forest).

During the Civil War of 1891, Daniel Ortúzar and the priest of Alcones were transferred as prisoners from Pichilemu to Valparaíso via the dock, which was later burned. The dock was later reconstructed and used until 1912, but it never reached "port" status.

The inheritors of Lauriano Gaete and Ninfa Vargas, who were proprietors of the land which is currently Central Pichilemu, traced the initial design of the city by dividing the land in plots, defined by engineer Emilio Michón. By decree of President Jorge Montt and his Interior Minister, Manuel José Irarrázabal, the territory was officially established as an "autonomous commune" on 22 December 1891. José María Caro Martínez became the first mayor of the commune in 1894. Caro Martínez held the mayor office until 1905.

Agustín Ross Edwards, a wealthy politician, bought a 300-hectare (740-acre) tract of land, and named it La Posada, in 1885. At the time, it was merely a set of thick-walled barracks.

Agustín Ross turned Pichilemu into a summer resort town for affluent people from Santiago. He designed an urban setting that included a park and a forest of over 10 hectares (25 acres). He transformed La Posada into a hotel, named Gran Hotel Pichilemu, which has since been renamed to Hotel Agustín Ross. He built the Ross Casino (currently a cultural centre), several chalets, terraces, embankments, stone walls, a balcony facing the beach, and several large homes with building materials and furniture imported from France and England. However, Ross was not able to build the dock he had planned for the town. He died in 1926 in Viña del Mar. Agustín Ross' inheritors donated all of his construction (streets, avenues, squares, seven hectares of forests, the park in front of the hotel, the perrons, the balcony, and the terraces) to the Municipality of Pichilemu, on the condition that the municipality would hold them for recreation and public access. The Agustín Ross Casino, constructed in 1905, and the Agustín Ross Park, constructed in 1885, have since become an important part of the city, and have been declared Monumentos Históricos (Historic Monuments) by the National Monuments Council.

After the creation of the Cardenal Caro Province, by decree of General Augusto Pinochet on 3 October 1979, Pichilemu became its capital. The province is named after the first Chilean Catholic Cardinal, José María Caro Rodríguez, who was born in Pichilemu.

Former mayors Jorge Vargas González (left) and Marcelo Cabrera Martínez (right), both pictured in 2024, key figures during the municipal political controversies of the 2000s.

Between 2003 and 2009, the municipality of Pichilemu was embroiled in a succession of political and corruption scandals. In March 2003, local businesswoman Lidia Catalán accused mayor Jorge Vargas González of bribery after he demanded two million pesos for operating a bicycle rental service, leading to the Caso Video after Catalán recorded their conversations; Vargas was convicted of bribery in March 2006, receiving a 541-day suspended sentence and a disqualification from holding public office, a verdict upheld by the Supreme Court of Chile in June 2007. Concurrently, municipal councillors filed formal complaints regarding the misuse of municipal health service funds to finance promotional calendars bearing Vargas's portrait, an investigation dubbed Caso Calendarios. Following Vargas' removal in July 2007, councillor Víctor Rojas González assumed the mayoralty, but governance collapsed into greater turmoil in September 2007 under the Caso Parquímetros, when audio recordings revealed municipal authorities soliciting bribes for the town's parking meter concessions; the investigation prompted the arrest of Rojas, former mayor Vargas, and several top officials, causing eighteen leadership successions in the mayor's office over the subsequent two years, including councilors Marcelo Cabrera Martínez (elected mayor in 2008, briefly holding the office) and Hernán Garrido.

Pichilemu was severely affected by the 2010 Chile earthquake and its subsequent tsunami, which caused massive destruction in the coastal zone. On 11 March 2010, at 11:39:41 (14:39:41 UTC), a magnitude 6.9 earthquake occurred 15 kilometres (9 mi) northwest of Pichilemu, killing one person.

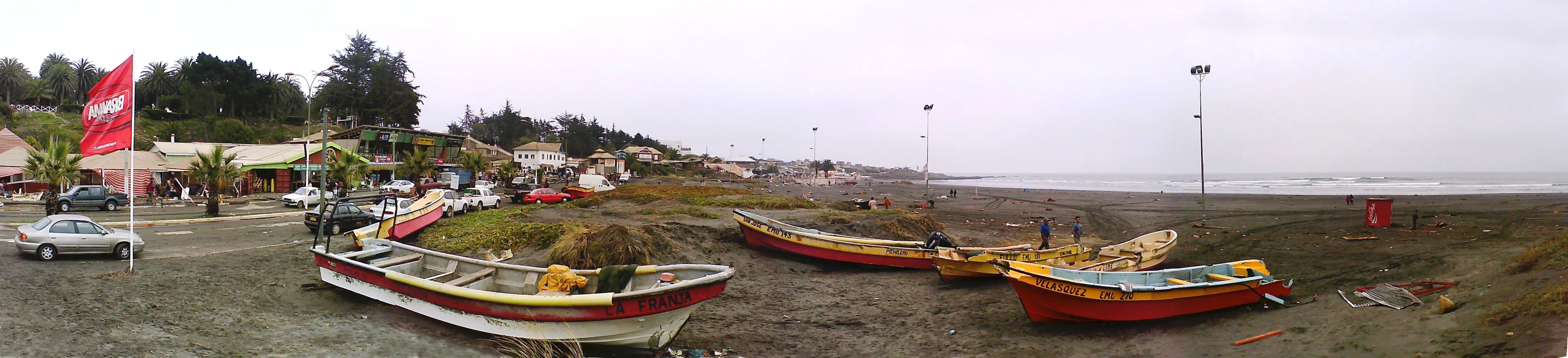
A panoramic view of Pichilemu beach shortly after the 2010 Chile earthquake.

== Geography ==
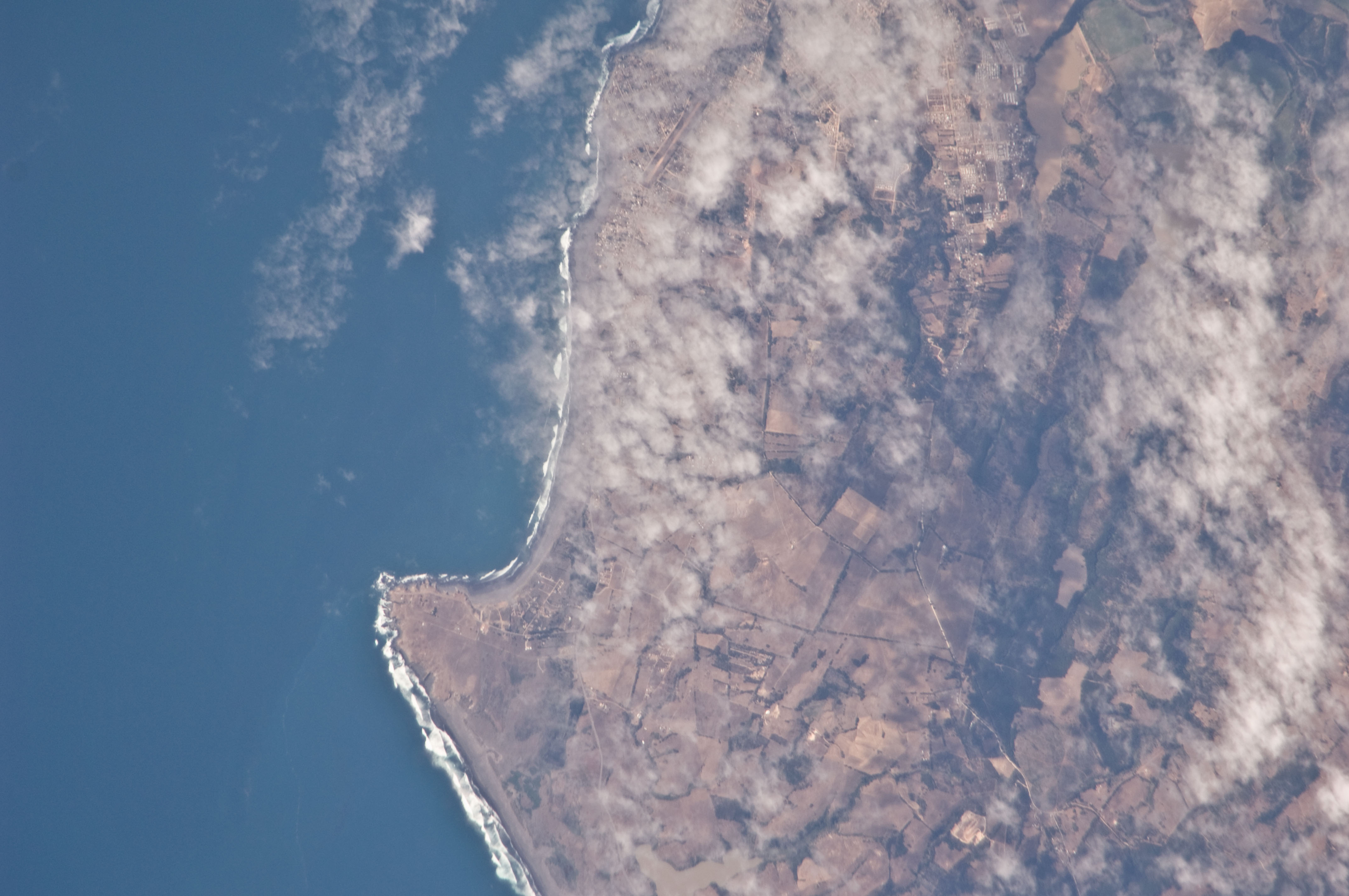
Aerial view of Pichilemu. The urban area is located at the top, while Punta de Lobos can be seen at the bottom.

Pichilemu is located 126 kilometres (78 mi) west of San Fernando, in the westernmost area of the O'Higgins Region, on the coast of the Pacific Ocean. It is within a three-hour drive of the Andes Mountains. It is near the Cordillera de la Costa (Coastal Mountain Range) which rises to 2,000 metres (6,562 ft) in elevation.

The city is bordered by Litueche to the north, Paredones to the south, and Marchigüe and Pumanque to the east. To the west lies the Pacific Ocean. Pichilemu covers an area of 749.1 square kilometres (289.2 sq mi).

Pichilemu is located close to a geological fault (Pichilemu Fault), which is according to reports between the city and Vichuquén at 15 km depth, 40 km in length and 20 km wide. It is not known whether the fault was formed during the March 2010 earthquake or if it was just reactivated.

Although the majority of the forest areas around Pichilemu are covered with pine and eucalyptus plantations, a native Maulino forest (now the Municipal Forest) remains. It contains species such as litres, quillayes, boldos, espinos, and peumos.

The city consists of an urban centre and twenty-two rural villages: Alto Colorado, Alto Ramírez, Barrancas, Cáhuil, Cardonal de Panilonco, Ciruelos, Cóguil, El Maqui, El Guindo, Espinillo, Estación Larraín Alcalde, La Aguada, La Palmilla, La Villa, La Plaza, Las Comillas, Pueblo de Viudas, Quebrada del Nuevo Reino, Pañul, Rodeillo, San Antonio de Petrel, and Tanumé.

Nearby bodies of water (apart from the Pacific Ocean) include the Estero Nilahue, which flows to Laguna Cáhuil, Estero Petrel, which flows to Laguna Petrel, and El Barro, El Bajel, and El Ancho lagoons, the latter of which provides the city with drinking water.

Pichilemu experiences a Mediterranean climate, with winter rains which reach 700 millimetres (28 in). The rest of the year is dry, often windy, and sometimes with coastal fog. Occasionally the city receives winds as high as 150 kilometres per hour (93 mph).

== Demographics ==
Historical population
Year	Pop.	±%
1777-1779	1,743	—
1787	1,687	−3.2%
1813	5,705	+238.2%
1875	5,569	−2.4%
1885	6,957	+24.9%
1895	6,930	−0.4%
1907	7,787	+12.4%
1920	7,424	−4.7%
1930	6,929	−6.7%
1940	6,570	−5.2%
1952	7,150	+8.8%
1960	8,015	+12.1%
1970	8,042	+0.3%
1982	8,844	+10.0%
1992	10,510	+18.8%
2002	12,392	+17.9%
2012	13,916	+12.3%
2017	16,394	+17.8%
2024	19,847	+21.1%
Source: Grez-Cañete (2017); Enciclopedia Colchagüina

By the 17th century, Pichilemu had 1,468 inhabitants. In 1787, Pichilemu held 1,688 inhabitants, and the population rose to 11,829 by 1895. From there onward, the city's population progressively decreased: 7,787 inhabitants in 1907; 7,424 in 1920; 6,929 in 1930; and 6,570 in 1940. In 1952, the city's population increased to 7,150 inhabitants; however, the 1960 census showed it decreased to 5,724 inhabitants, and to 5,459 in 1970. The number of people in Pichilemu reached 8,844 in 1982, and in 1992, 10,510. As of the 2002 census, the population comprised 12,392 people, and 6,228 households.

The 2002 census classified 9,459 people (76.3%) as living in an urban area and 2,933 people (23.7%) as living in a rural area, with 6,440 men (52.0%) and 5,952 women (48.0%). According to the 2002 Casen survey, 544 inhabitants (4.4%) of the population live in extreme poverty compared to the average in the greater O'Higgins Region of 4.5%, and 1,946 inhabitants (15.7%) live in mild poverty, compared to the regional average of 16.1%.

The National Statistics Institute of Chile has estimated that, as of 2010, 78.96% of the inhabitants in the city were living in an urban area and 21.04% were living in a rural area, with 52.4% men and 47.5% women; the population density was estimated as 19.09 per square mile. In the 2012 census, the population of Pichilemu was 13,916 inhabitants; although earlier estimates put it higher.

Most of the people from Pichilemu are Catholic, as of the 2002 census, 7,611 persons (83.44%), well above the national and regional average (69.96% and 79.08%, respectively); the evangelical population is considerably lower, at only 689 people (7.55%); 361 (3.96%) said they were Atheists or Agnostic individuals, while the remaining 460 (5.04%) are part of other religions. Based on information from the Casen survey, twenty-four persons living in Pichilemu declared themselves as Aymaras in 2006, and in 2009, 390 people said they were part of the Mapuche indigenous ethnic group; the survey revealed no one living in Pichilemu claimed to be either of the Atacameños or of the Rapa Nui indigenous peoples.

== Governance ==
Pichilemu, along with the communes of San Fernando, Nancagua, Chimbarongo, Peumo, San Vicente de Tagua Tagua, Las Cabras, Placilla, Chépica, Santa Cruz, Pumanque, Palmilla, Peralillo, Navidad, Lolol, Litueche, La Estrella, Marchihue, and Paredones, is part of Electoral District No. 16 and belongs to the Senatorial Constituency (O'Higgins) of the electoral divisions of Chile.

Pichilemu is governed by the mayor (alcalde), who manages the executive function. The City Council (concejo municipal) manages the legislative function. The mayors and the councilors are elected popularly every four years, with possibility of re-election. The current mayor of Pichilemu is Roberto Córdova Carreño (independent, formerly a Socialist), elected in October 2024, who returned to the office after serving between 2009 and 2021. The councilors are Marcelo Cabrera Martínez (former mayor of Pichilemu in 2008), Aníbal Galarce Sandoval, Sofía Yávar Ramírez, José Luis Cabrera Jorquera, Pablo Canales Saravia, and Álvaro Álvarez Pérez. Both the mayor and the councilors took office on 6 December 2024, and their term will expire on 6 December 2028.

The Pichilemu Police, known in Spanish as Carabineros de Pichilemu, and officially Tercera Comisaría de Carabineros de Pichilemu, are commanded by Patricio Cisternas. The police station is located in front of the former Pichilemu post office building, in Daniel Ortúzar avenue.

== Economy ==
Tourism is the main industry of Pichilemu, especially in the urban centre and some rural areas such as Cáhuil and Ciruelos. Forestry, mainly pine and eucalyptus, is another major industry. The area is also known for handicrafts. Although fishing is not very important to O'Higgins Region, due to unsuitable coastlines, it is common in Pichilemu, Bucalemu, and Navidad.

Pichilemu has a clay deposit in the Pañul area. According to archaeological investigations, pottery was first manufactured in the area around 300 BCE. It is still a stalwart today — Ciruelos and El Copao are well known for the pottery created there.

== Landmarks ==
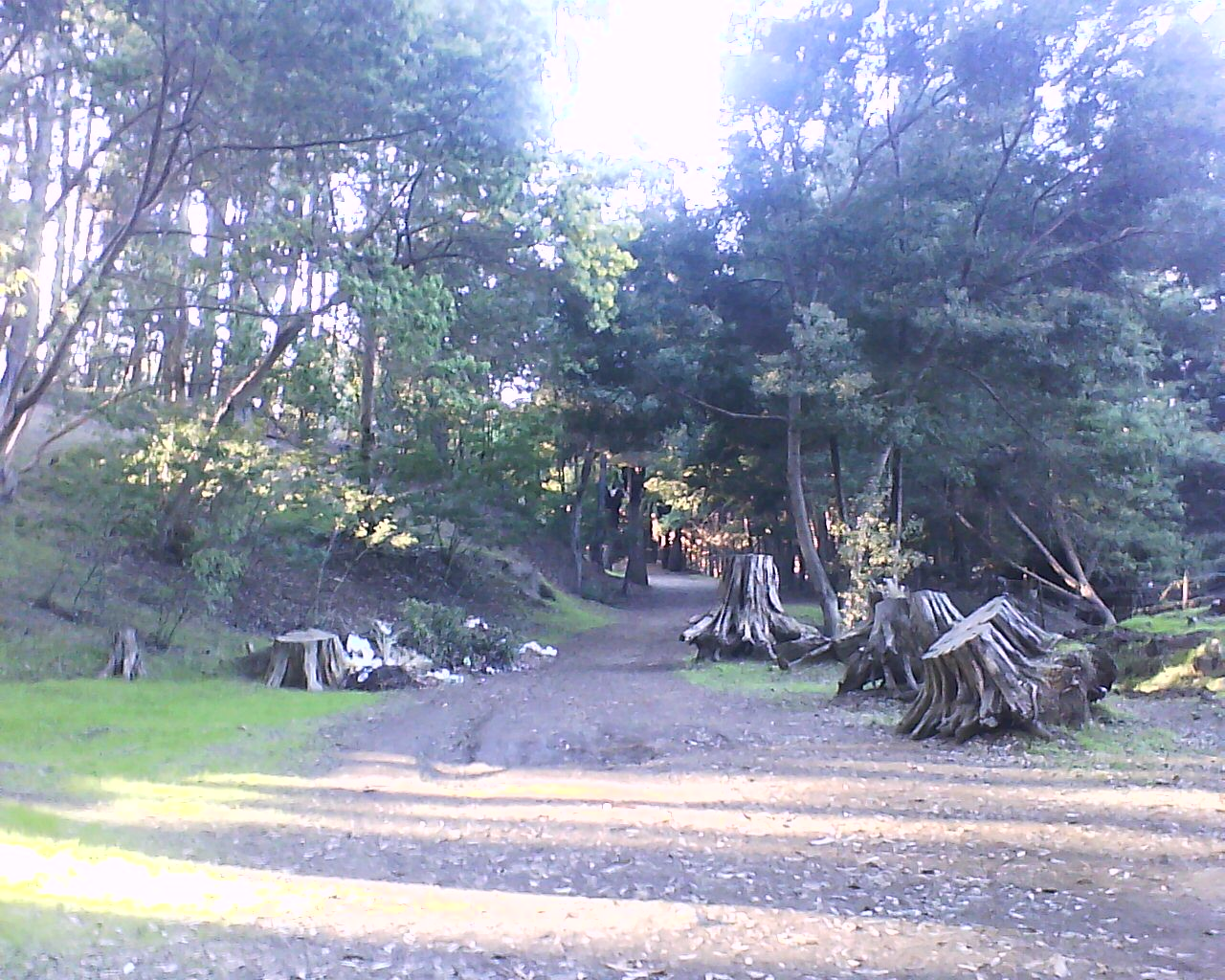
The Municipal Forest was donated by the Ross family in 1935

The Bosque Municipal (Municipal Forest) was donated by the Ross family in 1935. The main access to the forest is in front of Ross Casino, near Paseo el Sol; or by a road near the Colegio Preciosa Sangre. The forest has a footpath surrounded by palms, pines, and many other varieties of trees.

Conchal Indígena (Indigenous Midden) is an archaeological site of pre-Hispanic times. It is located on the site of an ancient fishing village 1 kilometre (0.62 mi) from Punta de Lobos and 0.3 kilometres (0.19 mi) south of Los Curas Lagoon. Laguna Los Curas (Los Curas Lagoon) is a natural area used for eco-tourist activities such as fishing located 7 kilometres (4.3 mi) south of Pichilemu. Another lagoon, the Laguna del Perro (The Dog's Lagoon) is located 8.5 kilometres (5.3 mi) south of Pichilemu. It is used for recreational activities.

Laguna El Alto (El Alto Lagoon) is a small, rain-fed lagoon located at Chorrillos Beach that is often used for camping and picnics. The lagoon is an hour and a half drive from Pichilemu, traveling to the north by Chorrillos beach. Poza del Encanto is a lagoon located 30 kilometres (19 mi) from Pichilemu. It is home to a large variety of native fauna. The Estero Nilahue (Nilahue Lagoon) is located 15 kilometres (9.3 mi) from Pichilemu. It has several beaches, including El Bronce, El Maquí, and Laguna El Vado.

St. Andrew Church is located in Ciruelos, 13 kilometres (8.1 mi) from Pichilemu. It was constructed in 1779, and its altar was built in the 1940s. It has a harmonium, confessional boxes, and ancient images of saints. Its original image of St. Andrew was made of papier mache. The old parish was created by Archbishop Rafael Valentín Valdivieso in 1864. Cardinal José María Caro Rodríguez was baptized there. The feast day of St. Andrew is celebrated every 30 November at the church.

The Museo del Niño Rural (the Rural Kid Museum) was created as an initiative of teacher Carlos Leyton and his students. It is a modern building that utilises traditional architecture. Three rooms contain a collection of stone tools, arrowheads, and clay tools made by the indigenous people of the region. Also on display are domestic tools from early colonists.

El Copao is a hamlet located 14 kilometres (8.7 mi) east of Pichilemu. Its main industry is domestic pottery production, using clay as a raw material. Pañul is a settlement located 17 kilometres (11 mi) from Pichilemu. Its name in Mapudungun means "medicinal herb." Pañul produces pottery made with locally obtained clay. Cáhuil is a small settlement located 13 kilometres (8.1 mi) south of Pichilemu. Its name in Mapudungun means "parrot place". Cahuil lagoon is used for fishing, swimming, and kayaking; kiteboarding lessons are offered on the lagoon. The Cáhuil Bridge is open to motor traffic, and has a view of the Cahuil zone. The bridge provides access to Curicó, Lolol, Bucalemu, and other nearby places.

Pichilemu was declared a Typical Zone by the National Monuments Council of Chile, by decree No. 1097 on 22 December 2004.

The city is home to five other National Monuments: Ross Park, Ross Casino, El Árbol Tunnel, the wooden railway station, Estación Pichilemu, and Caballo de Agua.

=== Agustín Ross Cultural Centre ===
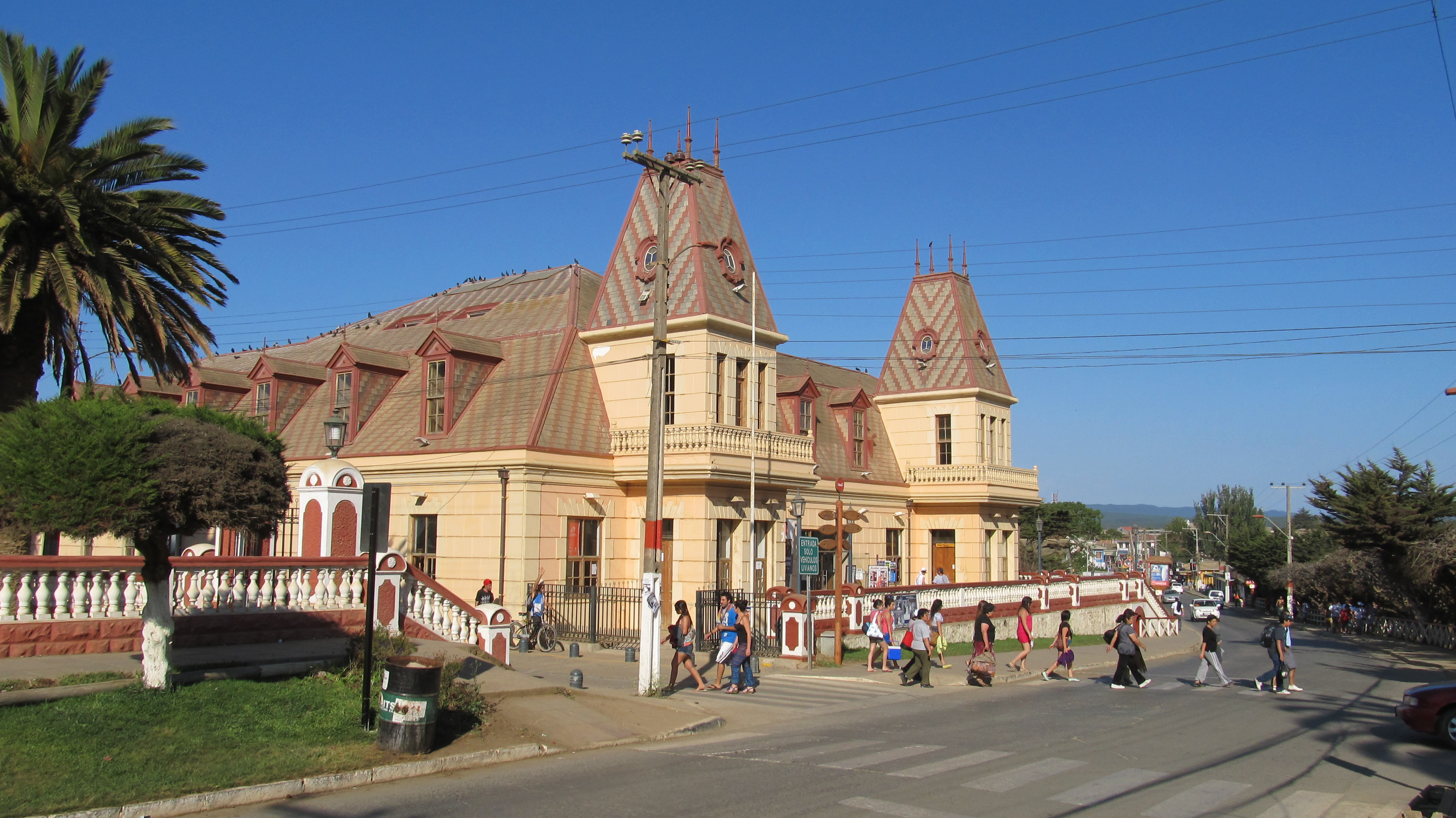
Agustín Ross Cultural Centre, in 2013.

The current Cultural Centre, in front of Ross Park, is a three-floor casino constructed with imported materials in the early 1900s by Agustín Ross. It originally housed a mail and telegraph service, with a large store. The first casino in Chile was opened in this building on 20 January 1906. It operated until 1932, when the Viña del Mar Casino was opened.

The building was renovated and reopened in 2009 as a cultural arts center. It currently houses several gallery spaces and the public library. During its restoration, workers found many historical artifacts, including a copy of Las Últimas Noticias from February 1941 when Ross Casino served as a hotel; an American telephone battery dating from the period of 1909 to 1915; and a tile from the casino's ceiling signed by workers during the building's construction in 1914.

Ross Park, created by Agustín Ross in 1885, contains hundred-year-old native Chilean palms (Phoenix canariensis) and many green spaces. It was restored in December 1987, and is now a popular walking destination. The former casino was named National Monuments in 1988.

Ross hotel was created by Agustín Ross in 1885, and originally named Great Hotel Pichilemu (Gran Hotel Pichilemu). It is one of the oldest hotels in Chile. Although it is still partially open to guests, it is in a state of disrepair.

=== Railway station ===
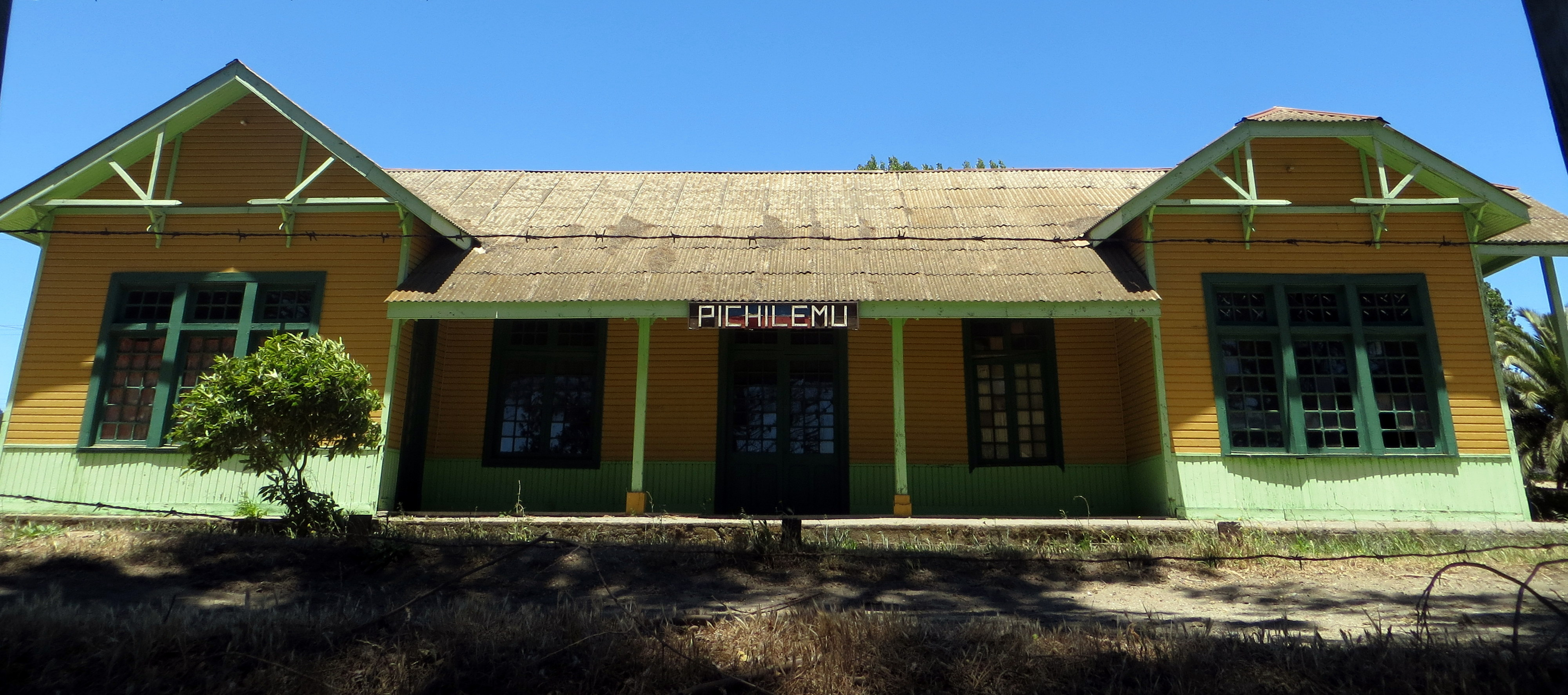
The old wooden railway station, Estación Pichilemu, in December 2013

The old wooden railway station, Estación Pichilemu, constructed around 1925, is one of the National Monuments of Chile. In the O'Higgins Region, 357 kilometres (222 mi) of railway lines were constructed, but only 161 kilometres (100 mi) still exist. The 119 kilometres (74 mi) San Fernando–Pichilemu section was constructed between 1869 and 1926. Passenger services operated on the line until 1986 and freight services were operational until 1995. In 2006, the Peralillo–Pichilemu section was removed completely.

It became a National Monument on 16 September 1994. It has since become an arts and culture centre and tourism information office. It exhibits decorative and practical objects from the 1920s, and features many old clothes.

=== Beaches ===
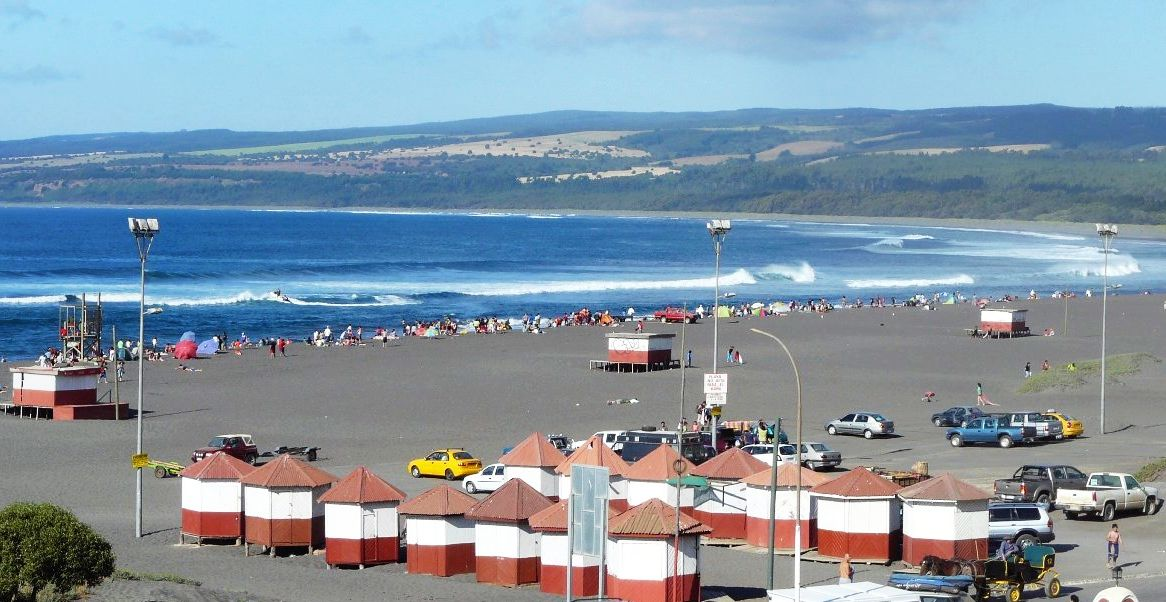
Pichilemu's beaches are popular among local and international tourists.

Pichilemu has several expansive dark sand beaches. The water is cool all year-round, and many tourists choose to swim at the shore break during the summer months. Common activities include bodyboarding, surfing, windsurfing, and kitesurfing.

The northernmost of the beaches is Playa Las Terrazas or Playa Principal (The Terraces Beach or Main Beach), which is in front of Ross Park. It is popular for surfing. Near the beach and at Ross Park, there are balustrades and long stairs dating from the early 1900s. There is a balcony over the rocks at the southern end of the beach. It is the busiest during the summer months. Several surf schools, such as La Ola Perfecta, and Lobos del Pacífico, are located nearby, as is the fish market at Fishermen Creek.

Located south of the town and around the other side of the Puntilla, Playa Infiernillo (Little Hell Beach) is rocky and has tide-pools. This area is used for fishing. South of Infiernillo is Playa Hermosa (Beautiful Beach), which is popular for walking and fishing.

Further south, 6 kilometres (3.7 mi) from Pichilemu, Punta de Lobos has a beach sheltered from the southern winds. It is an increasingly popular destination for tourists and surfers. Several surf contests are held there every year. The size of waves varies throughout the year. Large swells in fall and winter can reach heights of up to 15 metres (49 ft). It is widely considered one of the best beaches for surfing worldwide. In 2012, it was named one of the "50 most thrilling surf destinations".

Pichilemu is regarded as the prime location for surfing in Chile, particularly at Punta de Lobos. Every October and December, an International Championship of Surf is held at La Puntilla Beach. Punta de Lobos hosts the Campeonato Nacional de Surf (National Surfing Championship) every summer.

== Media ==
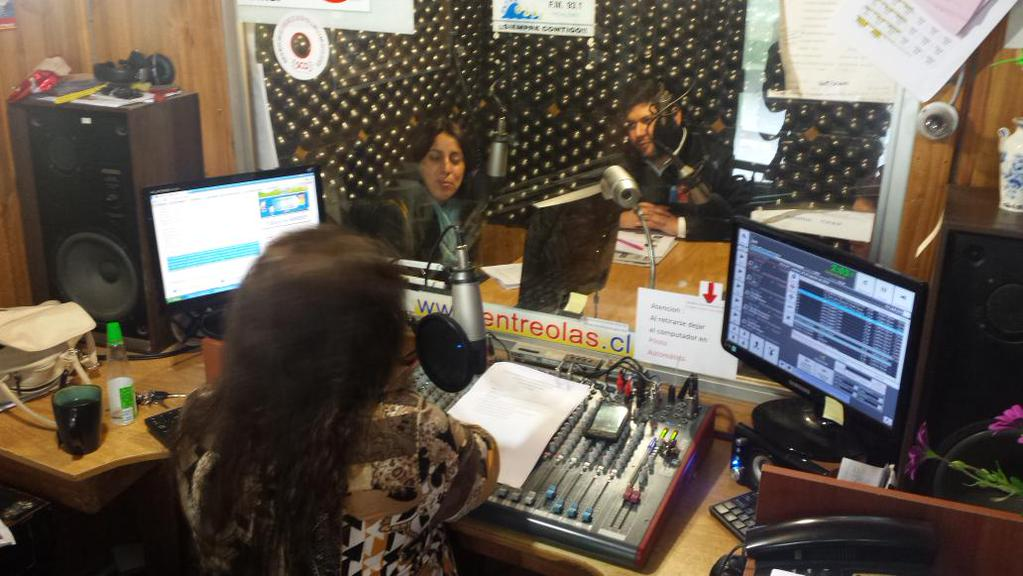
Sports Subsecretary of Chile Nicole Sáez during an interview on Radio Entreolas, in August 2015.

There are three online newspapers based in the commune of Pichilemu: El Marino, founded in 2013 by journalist Diego Grez; pichilemunews, the continuation of Pichilemu, a print newspaper published in 1944 and in the 1980s, directed by former councilor Washington Saldías; and El Expreso de la Costa ("The Express of the Coast"), a formerly monthly print newspaper directed by Félix Calderón Vargas, published between 2000 and 2015, remaining since in online format.

Radio services come from Radio Entreolas, Radio Atardecer, Radio Somos Pichilemu (directed by former mayor Jorge Vargas González and owned by his wife and former councilor Andrea Aranda), Radio Isla, Radio Corporación, SurfBeats Radio, Lobos, PC Beach Radio, and Radio Movidita. A television channel, PichilemuTV.org (formerly Canal 3 Pichilemu), also broadcasts in the area.

== Education ==
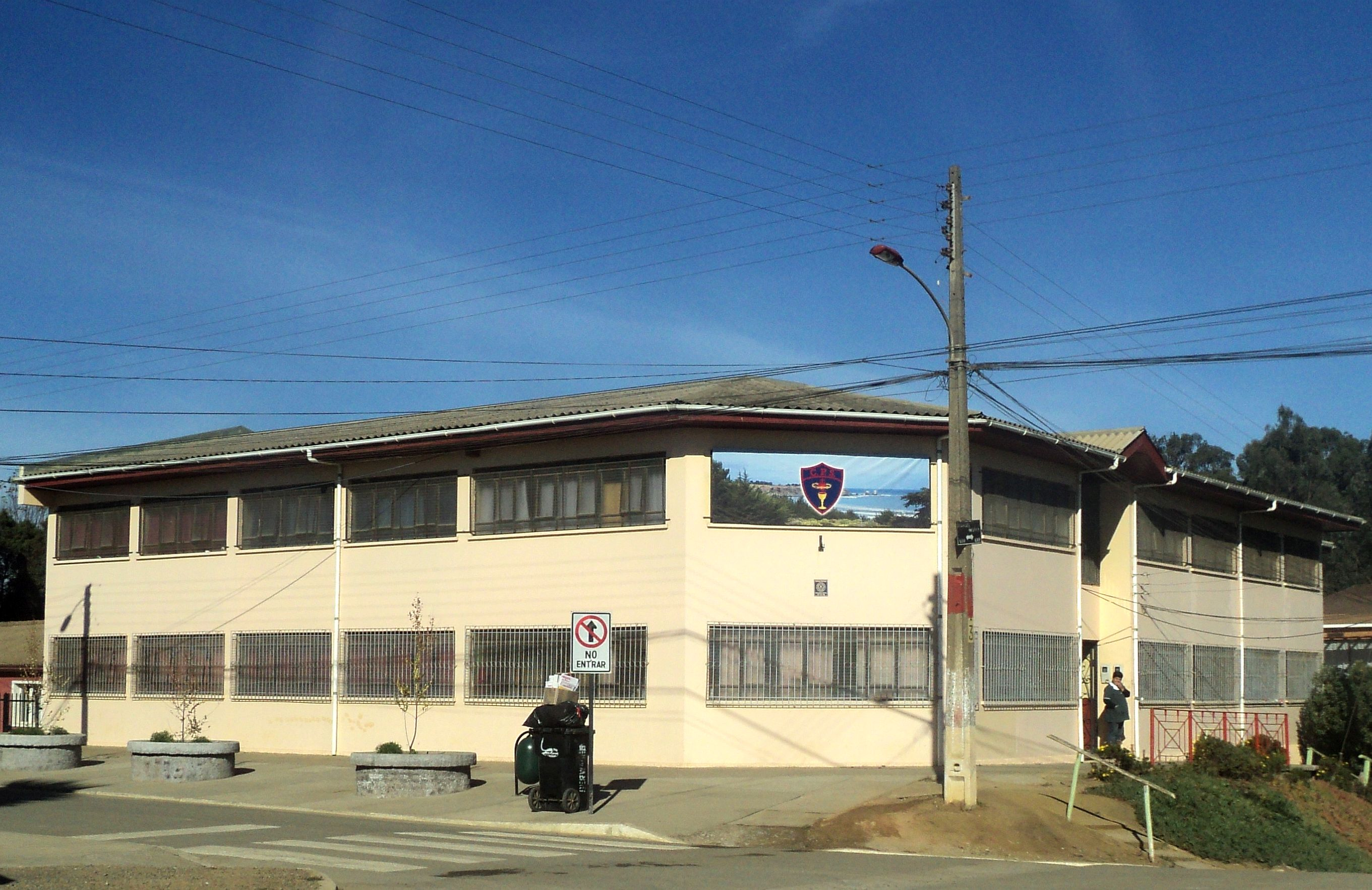
Secondary building of the Colegio de la Preciosa Sangre de Pichilemu

Education establishments in Pichilemu include Liceo Agustín Ross Edwards (Agustín Ross Edwards High School); a secondary school in El Llano; the primary and secondary school named Charly's School, and the primary school Escuela Digna Camilo Aguilar (Digna Camilo Aguilar School), both also located in El Llano; Colegio Libertadores (Liberators School), a primary school in Infiernillo; Colegio de la Preciosa Sangre (Precious Blood School), a primary and secondary school located near El Llano; Colegio Divino Maestro (Divine Master School), a primary school located near Cáhuil Avenue; Escuela Pueblo de Viudas (Pueblo de Viudas School), a primary school in Pueblo de Viudas; and Jardín Amanecer (Dawn Garden), a kindergarten school in El Llano.

Higher education first arrived at Pichilemu in 1970, when the Centro Medio Profesional de Pichilemu (Pichilemu Secondary-Professional Centre) was created; however, it was discontinued the next year. In 2002, thirty-one years after the Centro Medio Profesional was discontinued, the Universidad Academia de Humanismo Cristiano (Academy of Christian Humanism University) began to give classes of Engineering in Public Gesture Management, and Engineering in Environment Gesture Management. The university worked at the dependencies of Liceo Agustín Ross Edwards until 2008. At least ten people obtained their professional titles, while other ten are still in the process of obtaining their titles, as of December 2011. In November 2011, Governor of Cardenal Caro Province Julio Ibarra announced that an institute of higher education would be brought to the province, whose name, Instituto Profesional IPG (IPG Professional Institute), was disclosed one month later. During the inauguration of the 2012 school year in Pichilemu, Education Regional Secretary Minister (Seremi) Pedro Larraín said IPG would work in the dependencies of Colegio de la Preciosa Sangre of Pichilemu. It ceased operations in the 2010s. Beginning March 2023, the Centro de Formación Técnica Estatal de la Región de O'Higgins (O'Higgins Region State Technical Formation Center) started enrolling students in Pichilemu, providing classes on two technical courses.

== See also ==
- Outline of Chile
- List of cities in Chile
- People from Pichilemu
