= Cáhuil Bridge =

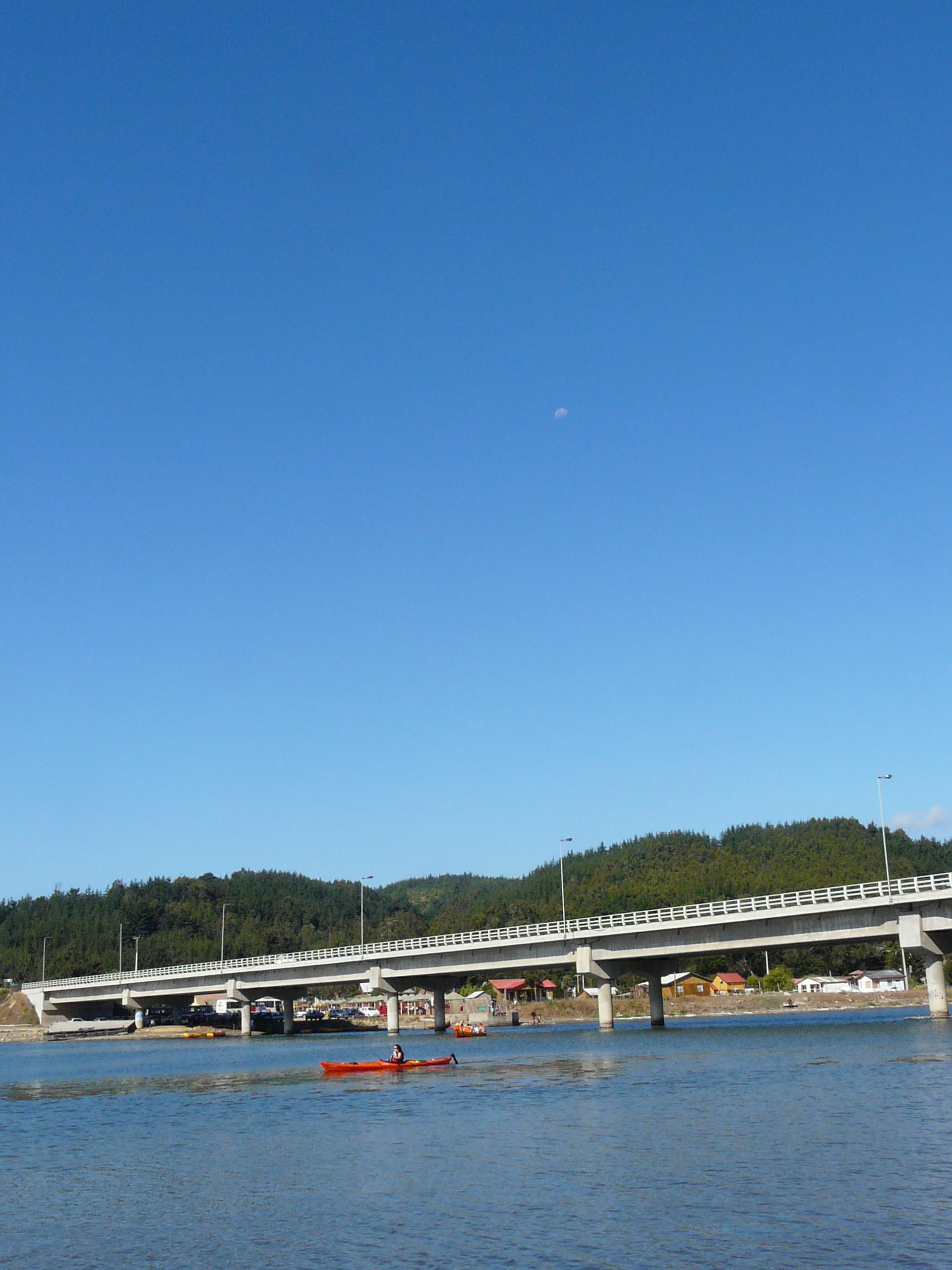
- The Cáhuil Bridge, as seen in 2008.
- Coordinates: 34.4803°S 72.0182°W
- Crosses: Cáhuil Lagoon
- Locale: Pichilemu, Chile
- Official name: Puente Cáhuil

History
- Opened: 2001

The Cáhuil Bridge (Spanish: Puente Cáhuil) is a bridge in Chile, located in the village of Cáhuil, Pichilemu, Chile. It connects Pichilemu and the southern commune of Paredones and the Bucalemu beach resort.

The bridge was completed in 2001.
