= Alcones =

Coordinates: 34°23′47″S 71°43′40″W

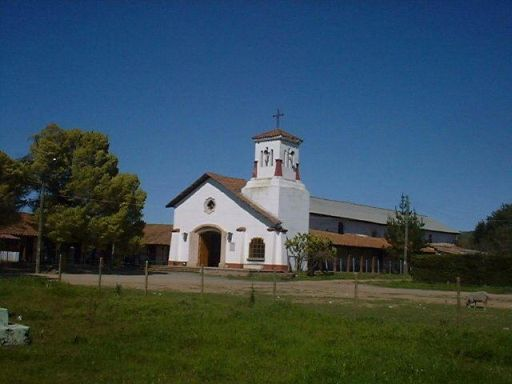
Church (Viceparroquia) of Alcones.

Alcones, formerly known as Los Halcones, is a Chilean village, currently part of Marchihue, Cardenal Caro Province.

It is located south of the village of Sauce; 15 kilometres (9.3 mi) north of Reto; east of Pichilemu; and 45 kilometres (28 mi) southeast of Palmilla.
