= Cabeceras =

Coordinates: 34°37′S 72°00′W

- Hamlet
- Cabeceras
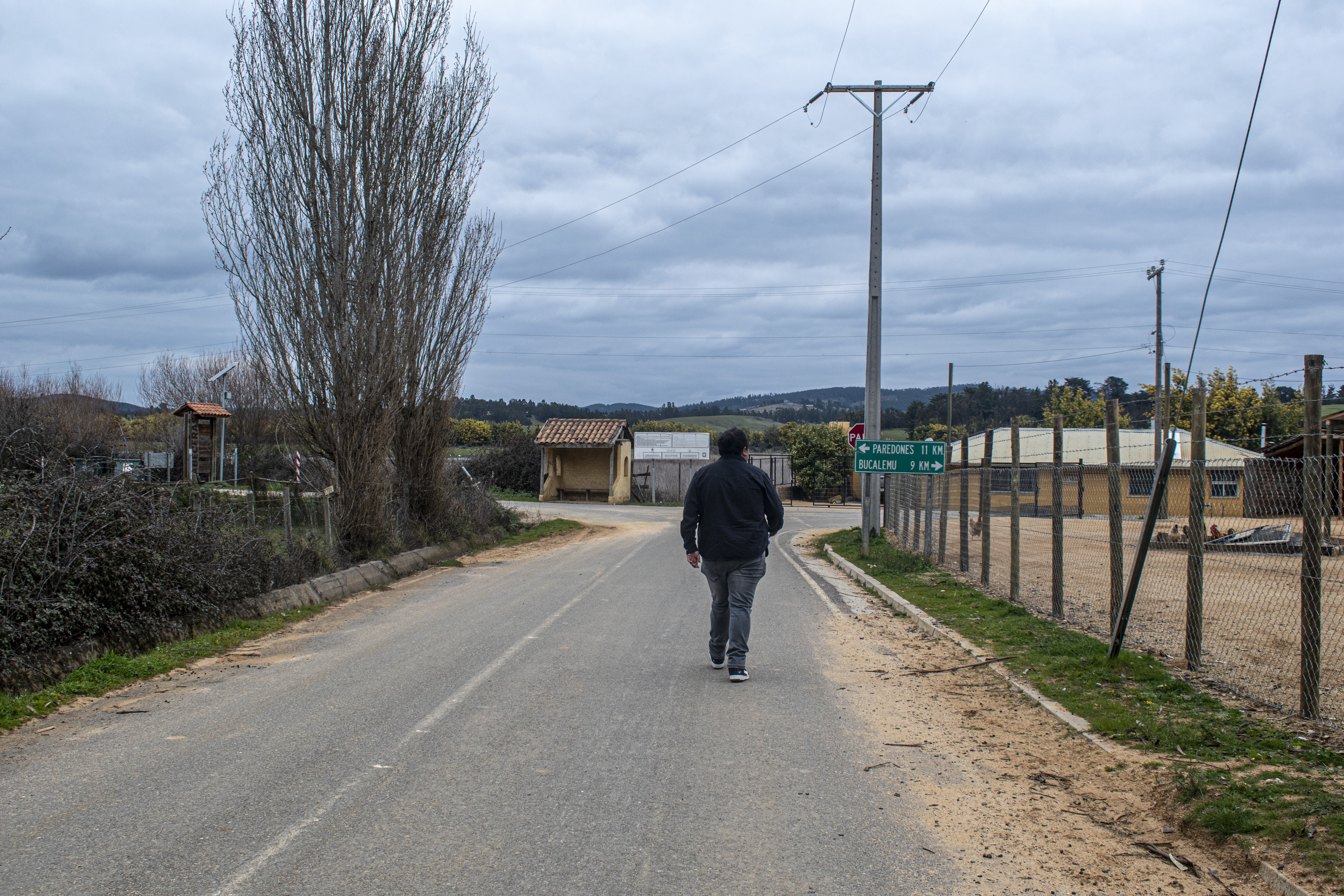
- Interactive map of Cabeceras
- Country: Chile
- Region: (O'Higgins Region) O'Higgins
- Province: (Cardenal Caro Province) Cardenal Caro
- Commune: Paredones

Cabeceras is a Chilean hamlet (caserío) located in Paredones, Cardenal Caro Province.

In 1899, as recorded in Diccionario Geográfico de la República de Chile by Francisco Solano Asta-Buruaga y Cienfuegos, the hamlet had 470 inhabitants. It was noted as being located northwest of then-village Paredones, near the lagoon of Bucalemu.
