= El Expreso de la Costa =

- First logo of El Expreso de la Costa (2000–12), and front page of the newspaper's 100th edition, published in January 2013.
- Type: Online; Former monthly newspaper
- Format: Online newspaper Former tabloid
- Owner: Félix Calderón
- Editor: Félix Calderón
- Founded: 2000
- Language: Spanish
- Headquarters: Pichilemu
- Website: expresodelacosta.cl

El Expreso de la Costa (English: The Express of the Coast) is a Chilean online newspaper, formerly a monthly newspaper, based in Pichilemu, O'Higgins Region. El Expreso circulated throughout the Cardenal Caro Province, of which Pichilemu is the capital.

The newspaper is directed by Félix Calderón Vargas. El Expreso's first edition was published on 30 June 2000, with ten more editions coming later until the newspaper's suspension in that same year. The newspaper was re-activated in 2005, with its twelfth edition published on 7 October of that year; El Expreso was continuously published until July 2015.

== See also ==
- Radio Atardecer
