= La Palmilla =

- Village
- La Palmilla
- Country: Chile
- Region: (O'Higgins Region) O'Higgins
- Province: (Cardenal Caro Province) Cardenal Caro
- Commune: Pichilemu

La Palmilla (pronounced [la palˈmiʝa]) is a Chilean village located in Pichilemu, Cardenal Caro Province.
