= Las Comillas =

- Village
- Las Comillas
- Country: Chile
- Region: (O'Higgins Region) O'Higgins
- Province: (Cardenal Caro Province) Cardenal Caro
- Commune: Pichilemu

Las Comillas (Spanish for the quotes, pronounced [las koˈmiʝas]) is a Chilean village located in Pichilemu, Cardenal Caro Province.
