= Panilonco Aerodrome =

Panilonco Airport
- IATA: none; ICAO: SCMU

Summary
- Airport type: Private
- Serves: Cardonal de Panilonco, Chile
- Elevation AMSL: 574 ft / 175 m
- Coordinates: 34°17′07″S 71°56′55″W

Map
- Location of Pichilemu Panilonco Airport in Chile

Runways
| Direction | Length | | Surface |
| Direction | m | ft | Surface |
|---|---|---|---|
| 05/23 | 770 | 2,526 | Gravel |
- Sources: Landings.com Google Maps GCM

Panilonco Airport (Spanish: Aeródromo Panilonco) (ICAO: SCMU) is an airport 11 kilometres (6.8 mi) north of Pichilemu, a Pacific coastal city in the O'Higgins Region of Chile.

The runway is 2 kilometres (1.2 mi) inland from the coast. It has ravines at each end and along its length.

It is owned by Sociedad Agrícola Ganadera y Forestal Las Cruces Ltda., and it was authorized by Directorate General of Civil Aviation on February 19, 1998.

== See also ==
- Transport in Chile
- List of airports in Chile
