= Cóguil =

- Village
- Cóguil
- Country: Chile
- Region: (O'Higgins Region) O'Higgins
- Province: (Cardenal Caro Province) Cardenal Caro
- Commune: Pichilemu

Cóguil (pronounced [ˈkoɣil]) is a Chilean village located in Pichilemu, Cardenal Caro Province.
