= Alto Colorado =

Coordinates: 34°18′41.29″S 71°52′45.60″W

- Village
- Alto Colorado
- Interactive map of Alto Colorado
- Country: Chile
- Region: (O'Higgins Region) O'Higgins
- Province: (Cardenal Caro Province) Cardenal Caro
- Commune: Pichilemu

Alto Colorado (Spanish for Upper Colorado, pronounced [ˈalto koloˈɾaðo]) is a Chilean village located 15 kilometres (9.3 mi) northeast of Pichilemu, Cardenal Caro Province.
