= La Villa =

La Villa may refer to:

- LaVilla, a neighborhood of Jacksonville, Florida and former independent city
- La Villa, Texas, a city in Hidalgo County, Texas
- La Villa, Pichilemu, a village in Pichilemu, Chile
- La Villa de los Santos, Panama
- La villa, 2017 French film released in English-speaking markets as The House by the Sea
- Villa de Guadalupe, Mexico City, colloquially known as "La Villa"
- La Villa-Basílica metro station, in Mexico City
- La Villa (Mexico City Metrobús), a BRT station in Mexico City
- La Villa River, river in Panama
