= Pueblo de Viudas =

- Village
- Pueblo de Viudas
- Country: Chile
- Region: (O'Higgins Region) O'Higgins
- Province: (Cardenal Caro Province) Cardenal Caro
- Commune: Pichilemu

Pueblo de Viudas (Spanish for widow's town, pronounced [ˈpweβlo ðe ˈβʝuðas]) is a Chilean village, currently part of urban Pichilemu, Cardenal Caro Province, O'Higgins Region.
