= Radio Somos Pichilemu =

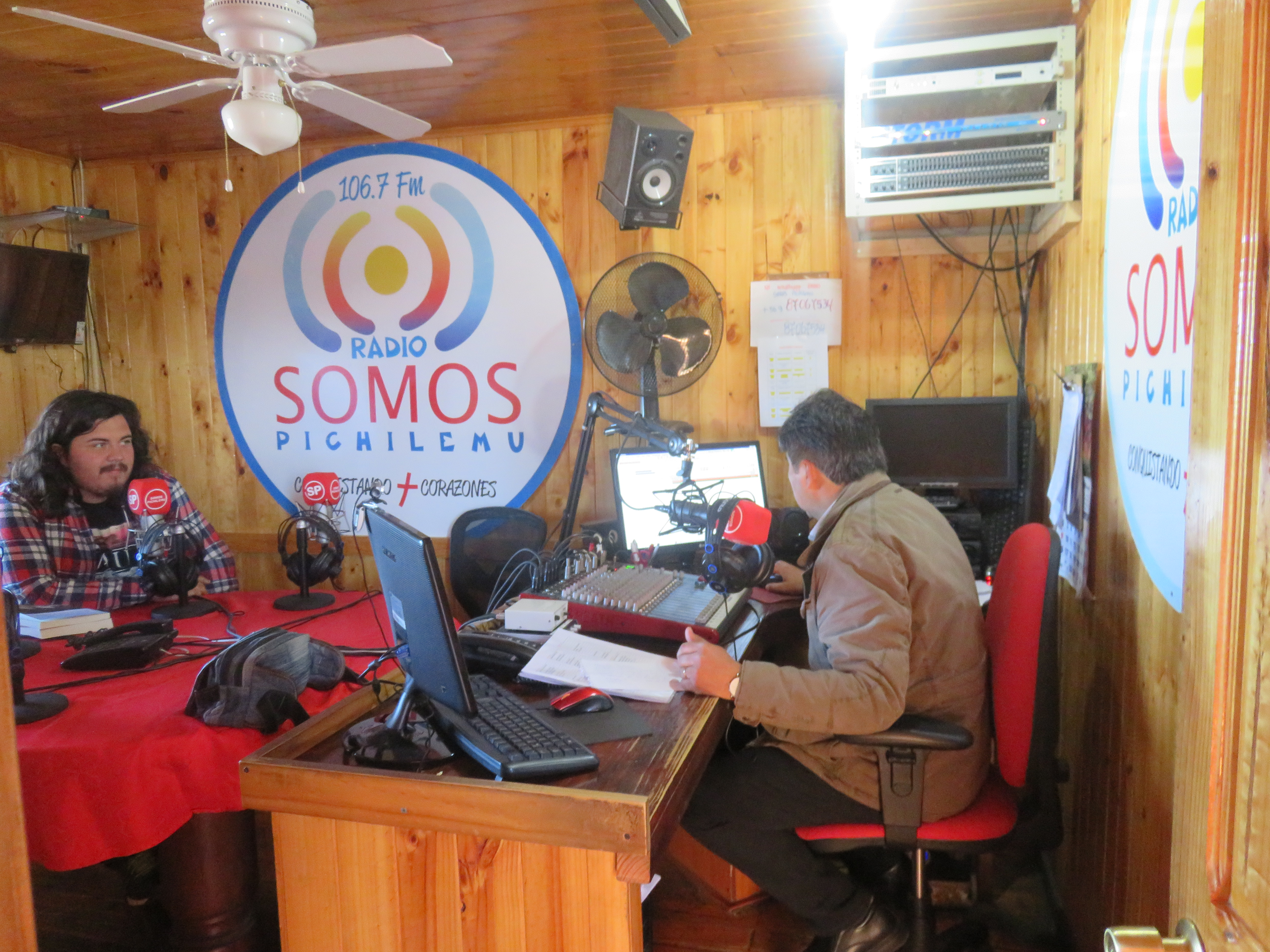

Pichilemu; Chile
- Broadcast area: Cardenal Caro province
- Frequency: 106.7 FM
- Branding: FM

Programming
- Language: Spanish

Ownership
- Owner: Andrea Aranda Escudero Somos Pichilemu Producciones E.I.R.L.

History
- First air date: 2007

Links
- Website: http://www.somospichilemu.cl

Radio Somos Pichilemu ("We Are Pichilemu Radio") is a radio station located in Pichilemu, Chile. It is owned by Andrea Natalia Aranda Escudero Somos Pichilemu Producciones E.I.R.L. and directed by Jorge Vargas González.
