= Larraín Alcalde =

Coordinates: 34°26′S 71°57′W

- Village
- Estación Larraín Alcalde
- Interactive map of Larraín Alcalde
- Country: Chile
- Region: (O'Higgins Region) O'Higgins
- Province: (Cardenal Caro Province) Cardenal Caro
- Commune: Pichilemu

Larraín Alcalde, or Estación Larraín Alcalde (Spanish for Larraín Alcalde Station, pronounced [estaˈsjon laraˈin alˈkalde]), is a Chilean village located east of Pichilemu, Cardenal Caro Province.
