= Rodeillo =

Coordinates: 34°31′S 71°56′W

- Village
- Rodeillo
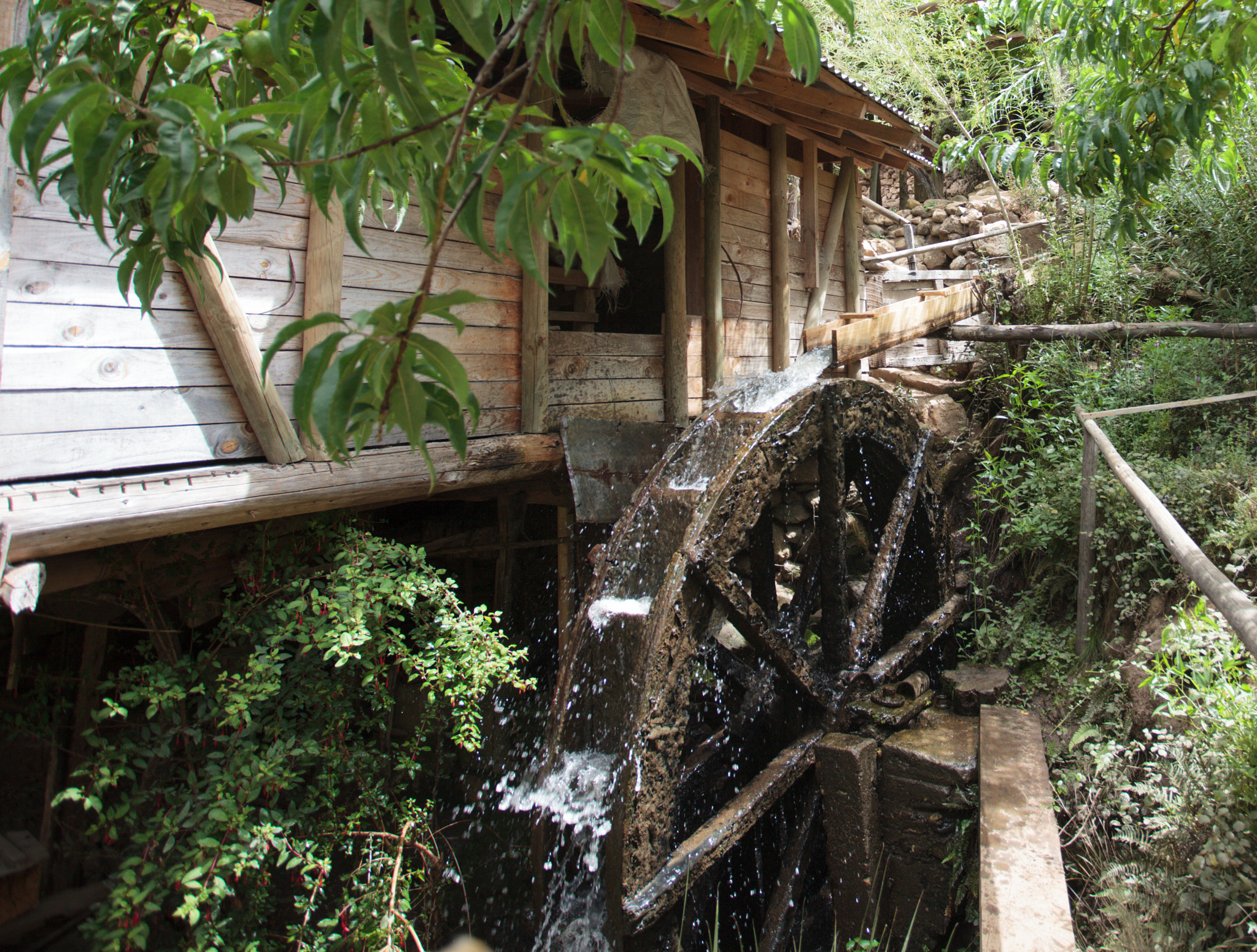
- Rodeillo water mill, Pichilemu commune
- Interactive map of Rodeillo
- Country: Chile
- Region: (O'Higgins Region) O'Higgins
- Province: (Cardenal Caro Province) Cardenal Caro
- Commune: Pichilemu
- ZIP code: 3220478
- Area code: (+56) 72

Rodeillo (pronounced [roðeˈiʝo]) is a village located 25 kilometers from Pichilemu, in central Chile.

The village has a water mill built in 1952 by countryman José Elizardo Muñoz Vargas; it has become a touristic attraction.
