= La Plaza, Pichilemu =

Coordinates: 39°42′S 72°22′W

La Plaza
- Village
- La Plaza
- Interactive map of La Plaza
- Country: Chile
- Region: (O'Higgins Region) O'Higgins
- Province: (Cardenal Caro Province) Cardenal Caro
- Commune: Pichilemu

La Plaza (Spanish for the square, pronounced [la ˈplasa]) is a Chilean village located in Pichilemu, Cardenal Caro Province.
