= Espinillo, Chile =

Espinillo
- Village
- Espinillo
- Country: Chile
- Region: (O'Higgins Region) O'Higgins
- Province: (Cardenal Caro Province) Cardenal Caro
- Commune: Pichilemu

Espinillo (pronounced [espiˈniʝo]) is a Chilean village located in Pichilemu, Cardenal Caro Province. It was heavily damaged by the February 27, 2010 and March 11, 2010 earthquakes.
