= SCMU =

SCMU may refer to:

- Panilonco Aerodrome (ICAO code), in Chile
- Scottish Commercial Motormen's Union, a former British trade union
- SCMU, the Mumbai Metro station code for Science Centre metro station, Mumbai, Maharashtra, India
