= Ciruelos =

Coordinates: 34°27′S 71°59′W

- Village
- Ciruelos
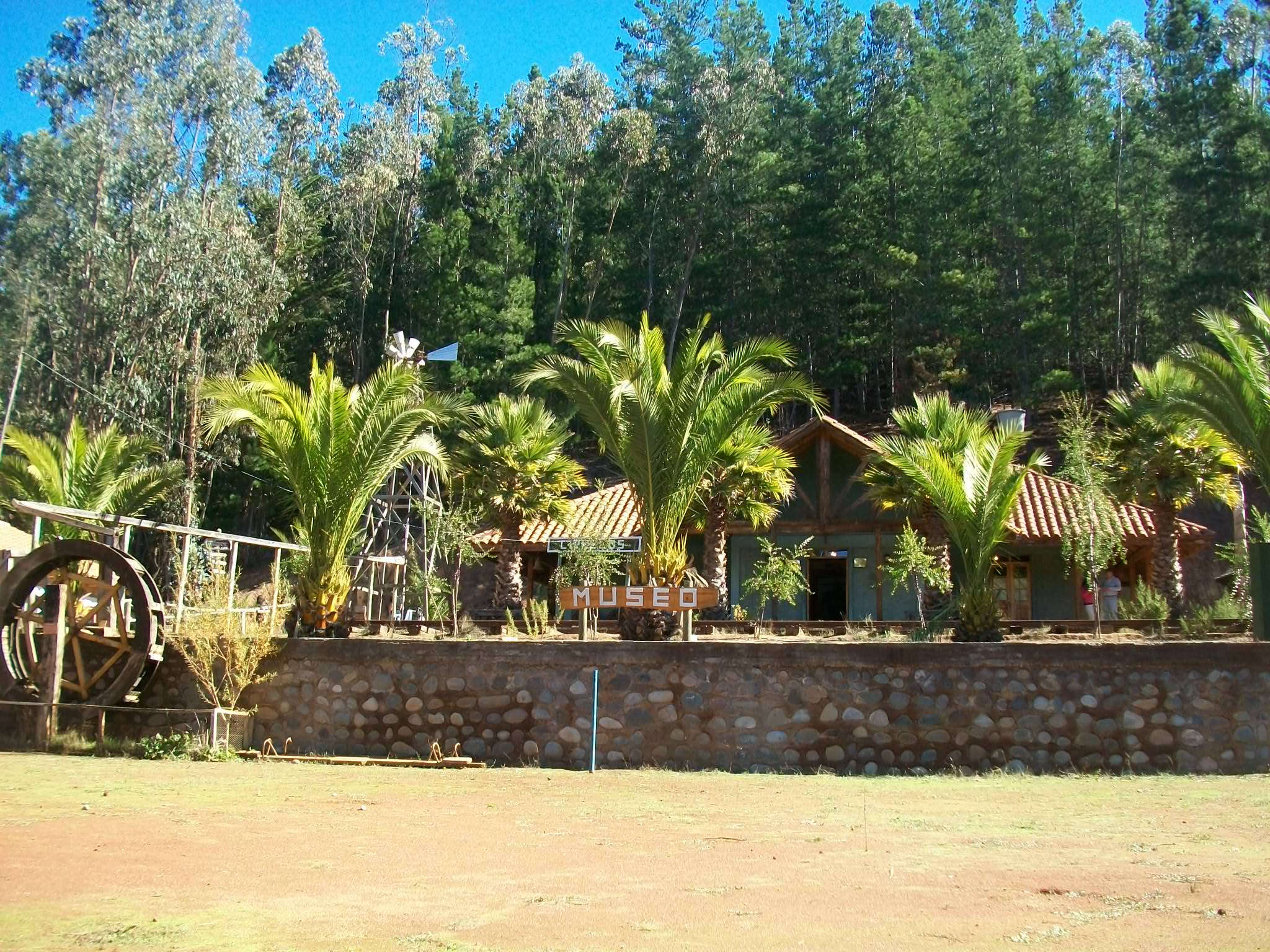
- Museo del Niño Rural, at Ciruelos
- Interactive map of Ciruelos
- Country: Chile
- Region: (O'Higgins Region) O'Higgins
- Province: (Cardenal Caro Province) Cardenal Caro
- Commune: Pichilemu

Ciruelos (Spanish for plum trees, pronounced [siˈɾwelos]) is a Chilean village located southeast of Pichilemu, Cardenal Caro Province. In 1899, it had very few inhabitants, a free school, and a post office.

== List of parish priests ==
- Tomás Gutiérrez Romo (1779–1782)
- Antonio Cornelio de Quesada y Molina (1782–1783)
- Interinos (1783–1788)
- Tomás Ostolaza y Donoso (1788–1829)
- José Alejo Zavala y Vargas (1829–1849)
- José del Tránsito Bustamante Martínez Coadjutor (1847–1850)
- Rafael Jofré Guajardo (1850–1854)
- Fernando Barrales (1854–1859)
- Vicente Núñez Valdivia y José María Aguirre interinos (1867)
- Pedro Aguilera, traslada la sede a Cahuil (1859–1867)
- José Miguel Vásquez (1867)
- José Agustín Contreras Jiménez (1867–1869)
- Ramón Sotomayor Valdebenito interino (1869)
- José María Montes Solar (1869–1870)
- Fray Antonio Buenaventura Ramírez (1870–1871)
- Félix Olea Pavez (1871–1874)
- Francisco Bustamante (1874–1877)
- Fray J. Hipólito Díaz Henríquez, administrador (1877)
- Máximo Gil (1877–1878)
- Roberto Sotomayor Montaner (1878)
- Nicanor Letelier Guzmán (1878–1880)
- Eliseo López Bravo (1880–1882)
- Ramón Cañón Vásquez (1882–1884)
- Emeterio Arratia Cáceres (1884–1888)
- Juan Agustín Figueroa y Rozas (1888–1891)
- Francisco Vilches Escorza (1891–1896)
- José Luis Allende (1896–1898)
- José del Carmen Lagos Tobar (1898–1900)
- Justiniano Rojas Olea (1900)
- Manuel Gundián Sierralta (1900–1901)
- Juan Antonio Grez Marull (1901–1903)
- Luis Alberto Rivera (1903–1910)
- Tomás Contreras González (1910–1911)
- Pacífico Retamal Rojas (1911–1921)
- José María Aldana Carrasco (1921–1925)
- Jaime Planells Planells (1925–1956)

Source: DOS PARROQUIAS DE LA DIÓCESIS DE LA SANTA CRUZ: SAN ANDRÉS DE CIRUELOS Y SAN JUAN EVANGELISTA DE TAGUA - TAGUA
