= Liceo Agustín Ross Edwards =

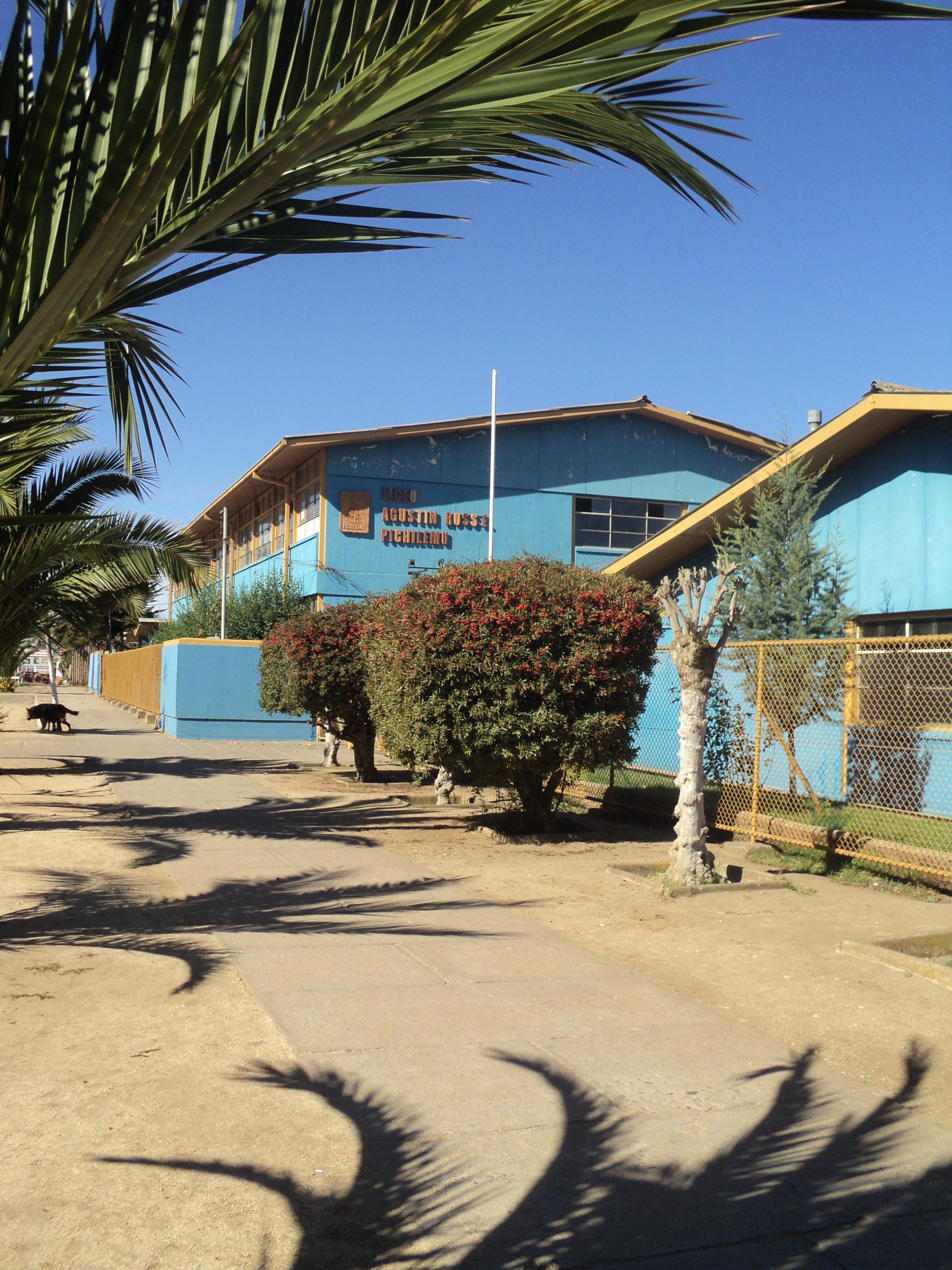
- Ángel Gaete St. 725, Pichilemu, Chile

Information
- Type: High school
- Established: 1979
- Principal: Hipólito Segundo Solano Rubio
- Enrollment: 562 (2015)
- Website: Liceo Agustín Ross Edwards

Liceo Agustín Ross Edwards (English: Agustín Ross Edwards High School) is a Chilean public (municipal) high school located in Pichilemu, Cardenal Caro Province. It is named after Agustín Ross Edwards, a Chilean politician and known for building the historic centre of the town of Pichilemu.

The high school was created in 1979, and works as a Humanistic Scientific high school. The high school has employed the Complete Scholar Journey (Spanish: Jornada Escolar Completa) since 1998.

The Liceo Agustín Ross Edwards' principal is Hipólito Segundo Solano Rubio. As of 2012, LARE had 562 students, and 38 teachers.
