= Pichilemu post-office building =

Pichilemu post office
- Oficina de Correos de Pichilemu
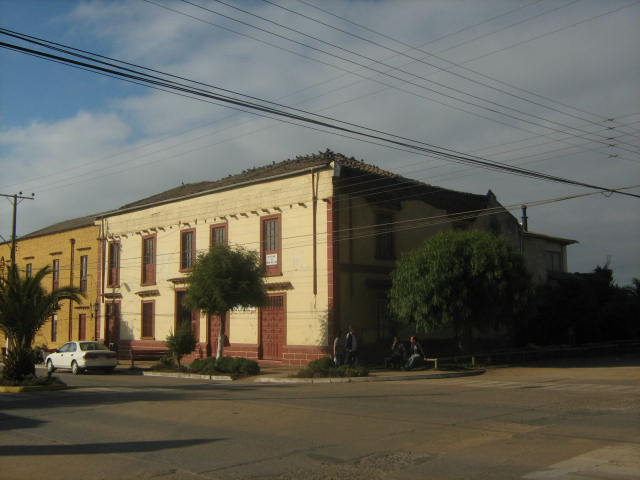
- Pichilemu post office building, in February 2010.

General information
- Type: Post office
- Location: Pichilemu, Chile, Daniel Ortúzar street
- Construction started: 1920s
- Inaugurated: 1920s
- Demolished: 2–3 July 2010
- Owner: Yávar family

Technical details
- Floor count: 2

Pichilemu post office building (Spanish: Edificio de la Oficina de Correos de Pichilemu) was a building located in Pichilemu, Chile, which served as the city's post office until 26 February 2010, the day before a magnitude 8.8 earthquake hit central Chile. The building was located in front of the Pichilemu Police station. It was demolished between 2 July until 3 July 2010.

The building was constructed by Daniel Ortúzar in late 1880s, and worked as hotel until 1911. It became a post office in 1991.

== History ==
The building was constructed by Daniel Ortúzar and his family, owners of hacienda San Antonio de Petrel, constructed the building in late 1880s. The "Hotel Bilbao" worked here until 1911, when it was bought by Pavez family.

The building was damaged after the Great Valdivia earthquake of 1960, and was reconstructed between 1962 and 1965. Hotel Asthur began working in the building in 1970.

The building worked as post office since 1991. It was severely damaged after the 27 February and 11 March 2010 earthquakes, and was demolished in July 2010.
