= Radio Corporación (Pichilemu) =

Radio Corporación Pichilemu
- Pichilemu; Chile
- Broadcast area: Cardenal Caro province
- Frequency: 97.7 FM
- Branding: FM

Programming
- Language: Spanish
- Format: Christian radio, news, community programming
- Affiliations: Radio Corporación

History
- First air date: 2007

Links
- Website: http://rcp977.cl

Radio Corporación Pichilemu is a Chilean radio station broadcasting on 97.7 FM from Pichilemu, in the O'Higgins Region, Chile. The station provides programming primarily oriented toward the communities of the Cardenal Caro Province, combining local content with national broadcasts associated with the Radio Corporación network.

Its programming includes news, community information, interviews, music, Christian content, public service announcements, and live programs aimed at local audiences. The station also broadcasts religious and social-interest programming, while maintaining coverage of local events and issues relevant to coastal communities in central Chile.

In addition to FM broadcasting, Radio Corporación Pichilemu distributes its content through online streaming platforms and digital media, extending access to listeners outside its traditional coverage area.
