= El Guindo =

Coordinates: 34°38′S 71°16′W

- Village
- El Guindo
- Interactive map of El Guindo
- Country: Chile
- Region: (O'Higgins Region) O'Higgins
- Province: (Cardenal Caro Province) Cardenal Caro
- Commune: Pichilemu

Area
  - Total: 64.8 km^{2} (25.0 sq mi)

Population (2002)
  - Total: 25
  - Density: 0.39/km^{2} (1.0/sq mi)

El Guindo (Spanish for the cherry tree, pronounced [el ˈɣindo]) is a Chilean village located in Pichilemu, Cardenal Caro Province. As of the 2002 census, the population comprised 25 people, and 8 households.
