= Alto Ramírez =

Coordinates: 34°27′56.90″S 71°54′44.58″W

- Village
- Alto Ramírez
- Interactive map of Alto Ramírez
- Country: Chile
- Region: (O'Higgins Region) O'Higgins
- Province: (Cardenal Caro Province) Cardenal Caro
- Commune: Pichilemu

Alto Ramirez (Spanish for Upper Ramírez, pronounced [ˈalto raˈmiɾes]) is a Chilean village located in Pichilemu, Cardenal Caro Province.
