= El Maqui =

- Village
- El Maqui
- Location within Chile
- Coordinates: 34°32′20″S 71°55′40″W
- Country: Chile
- Region: (O'Higgins Region) O'Higgins
- Province: (Cardenal Caro Province) Cardenal Caro
- Commune: Pichilemu

El Maqui (Spanish for the maqui, pronounced [el ˈmaki]) is a Chilean village located in Pichilemu, Cardenal Caro Province.
