= Radio Entreolas =

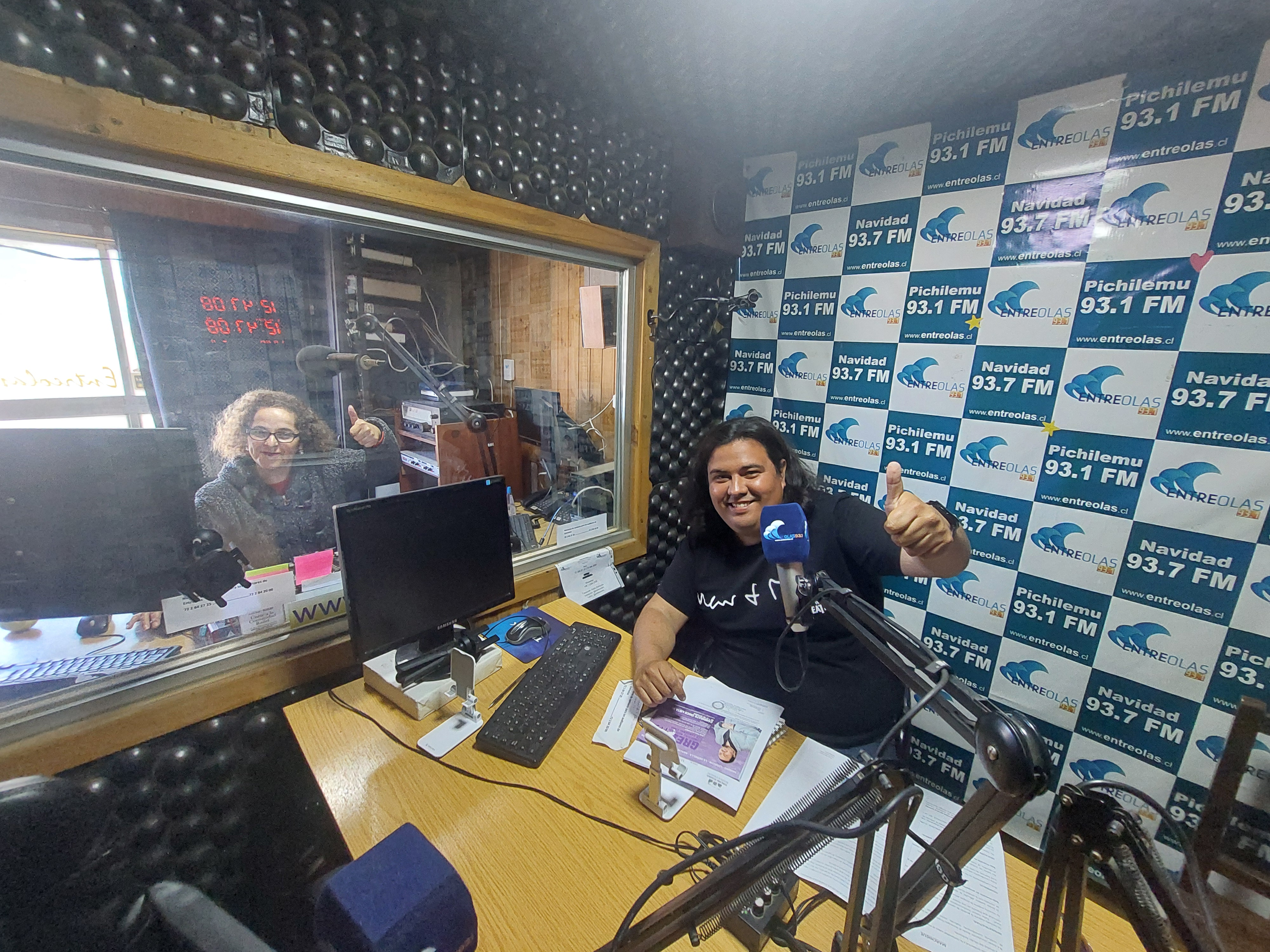

Pichilemu; Chile
- Broadcast area: Cardenal Caro province
- Frequency: 93.1 FM
- Branding: FM

Programming
- Language: Spanish

Ownership
- Owner: Jorge Nasser Guerra

History
- First air date: 1999

Links
- Website: http://www.entreolas.cl

Radio Entreolas is a radio station located in Pichilemu.
