= Pañul =

- Village
- Pañul
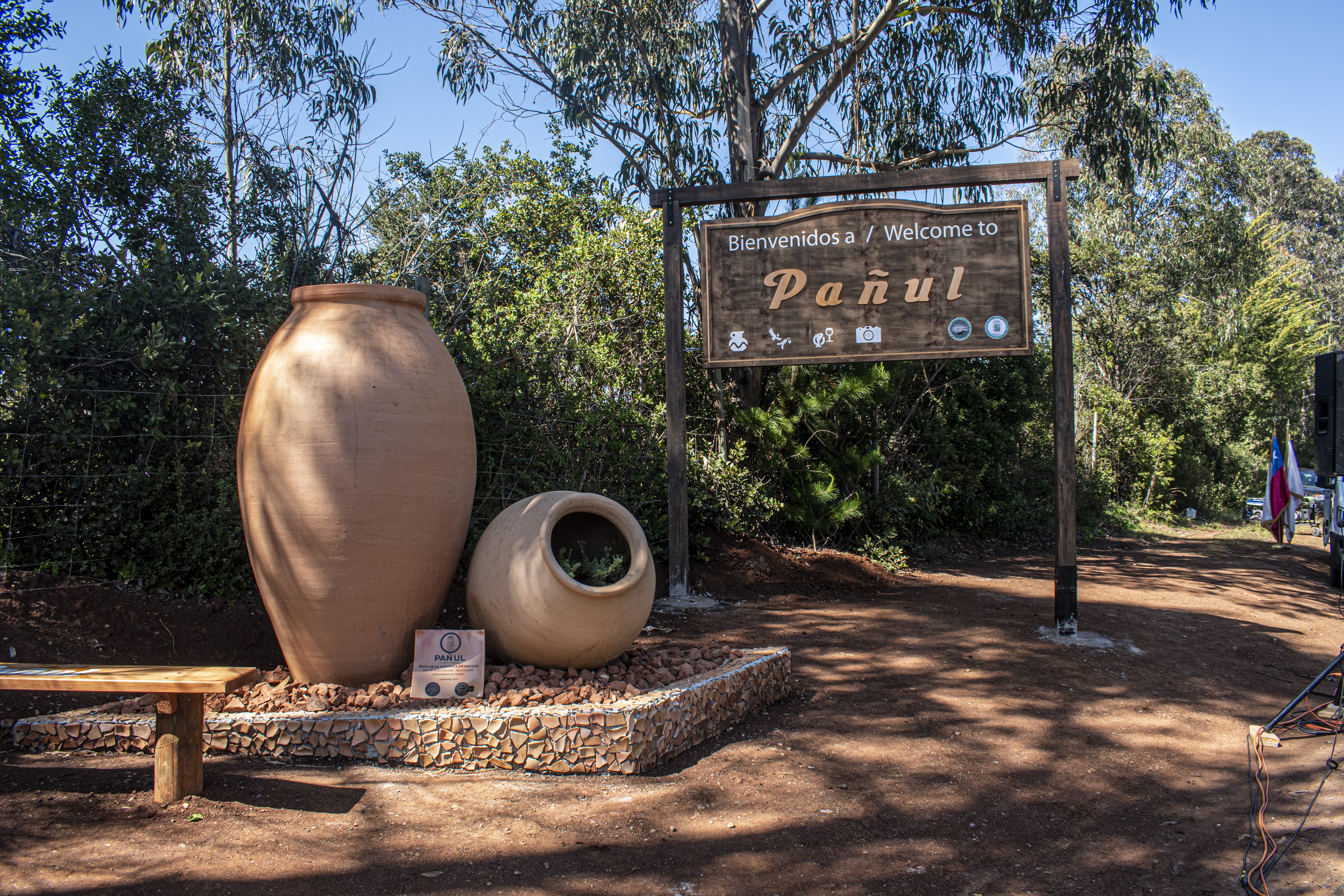
- Country: Chile
- Region: (O'Higgins Region) O'Higgins
- Province: (Cardenal Caro Province) Cardenal Caro
- Commune: Pichilemu

Pañul (pronounced [paˈɲul]) is a Chilean village located in Pichilemu, Cardenal Caro Province.
