= Cardonal de Panilonco =

- Village
- Cardonal de Panilonco
- Interactive map of Cardonal de Panilonco
- Country: Chile
- Region: (O'Higgins Region) O'Higgins
- Province: (Cardenal Caro Province) Cardenal Caro
- Commune: Pichilemu

Area
  - Total: 256.5 km^{2} (99.0 sq mi)

Population (2002)
  - Total: 852
  - Density: 3.32/km^{2} (8.6/sq mi)

Cardonal de Panilonco, or just Panilonco (Mapudungun: metal head, pronounced [kaɾðoˈnal de paniˈloŋko]) is a Chilean village located north of Pichilemu, Cardenal Caro Province. In 2002, the population was 852 people in 235 households.

== Etymology ==
Panilonco comes from Mapudungun pañil (metal) and lonco (head).
