= Cáhuil =

- Village
- Cáhuil
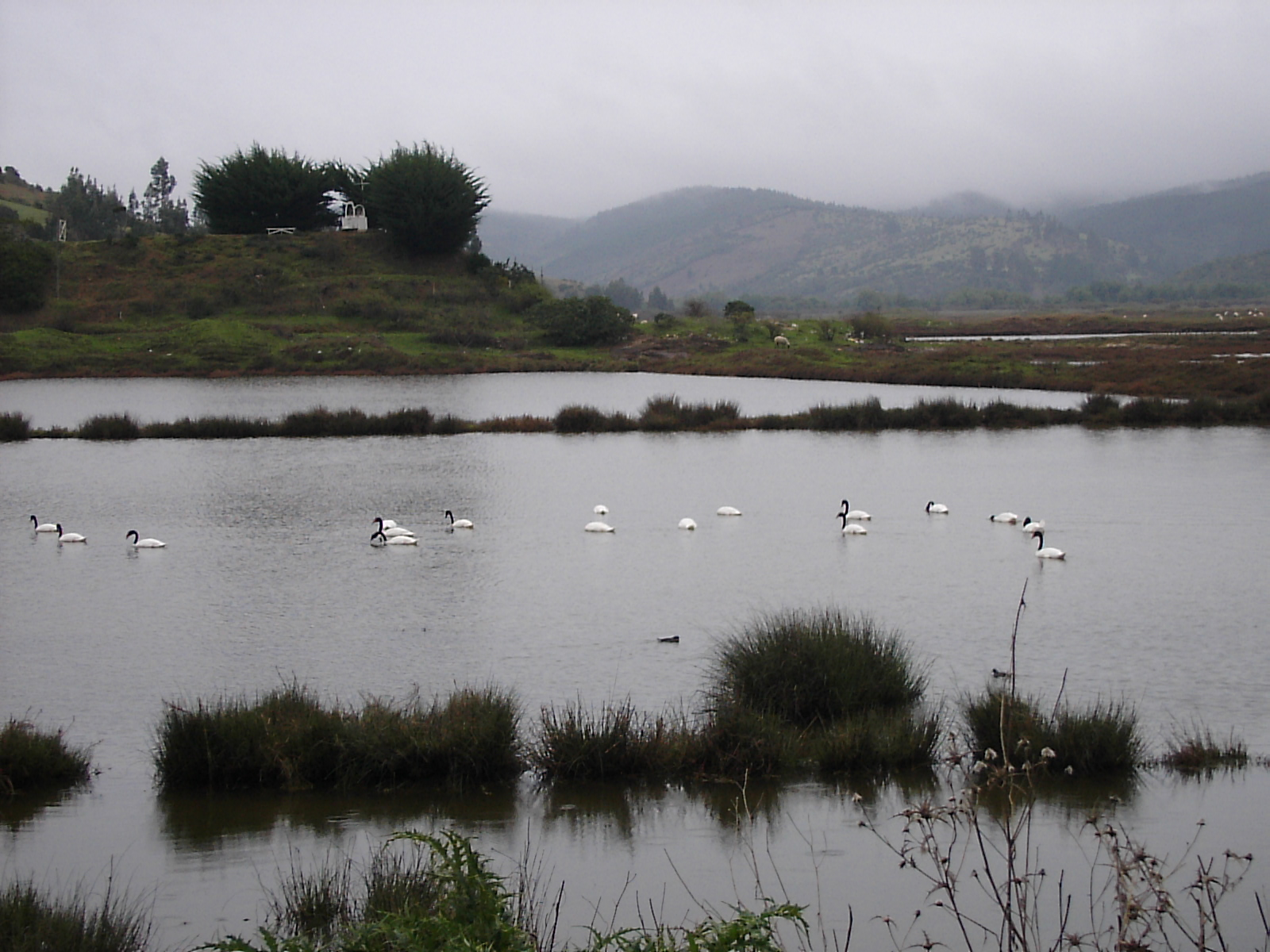
- Swans in Cáhuil
- Interactive map of Cáhuil
- Coordinates: 34°28′53″S 72°00′42″W
- Country: Chile
- Region: (O'Higgins Region) O'Higgins
- Province: Cardenal Caro
- Commune: Pichilemu

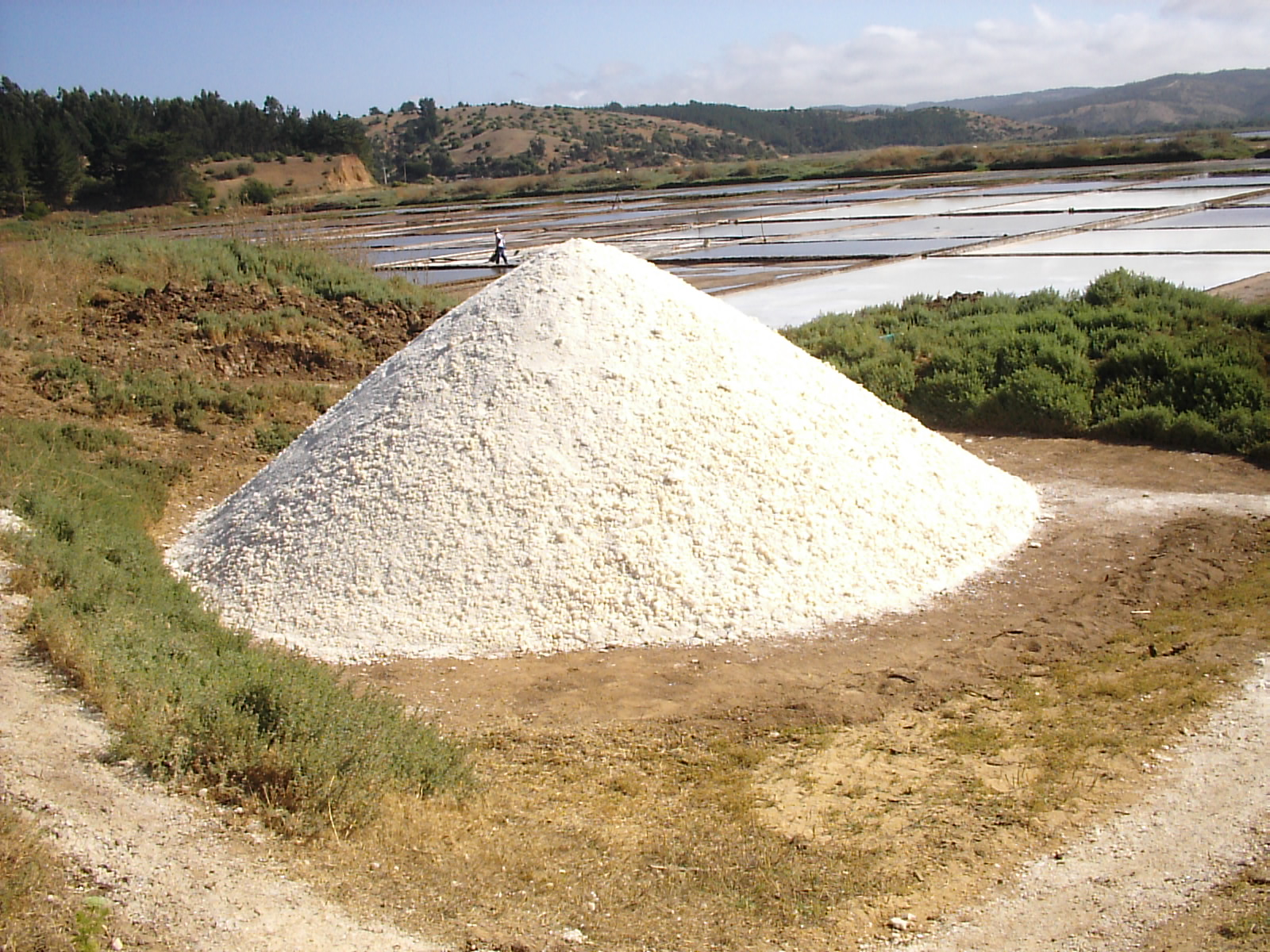
Salt mound in Cáhuil

Cáhuil (Mapudungun: Place of seagulls, pronounced [ˈkawil]) is a Chilean village located 15 kilometres (9.3 mi) south of Pichilemu, at the mouth of the seasonal Nilahue Estuary, in the O'Higgins Region. Its economy is based on the production of sea salt, oysters, and mussels. The estuary is suitable for fishing, swimming, and boating.

== Salt deposits ==
The production of salt is a very old practice in the area. The indigenous people were known to have extracted salt in a very rudimentary way. Production has increased using modern methods. As of 1978, more than 60% of the population of Cáhuil lives on the proceeds of salt production, unrelated to industrial enterprises.

To promote tourism in Cáhuil, the Municipality of Pichilemu created the "Salt Route", that takes tourists to places where salt is produced. This tour starts in Pichilemu and includes Cáhuil, Barrancas, La Villa, El Bronce, La Palmilla, and La Plaza. Along the route are two rural establishments, "Oro Blanco" and "El Bronce".

== Fauna ==
At least 46 bird species are found in the Cáhuil zone, many of them in danger of extinction. Some of them are the coscoroba swan, the brown-hooded gull, and the white-necked heron. The area hosts at least seven species of ducks.

== See also ==
- List of towns in Chile
