= Surfing in Chile =

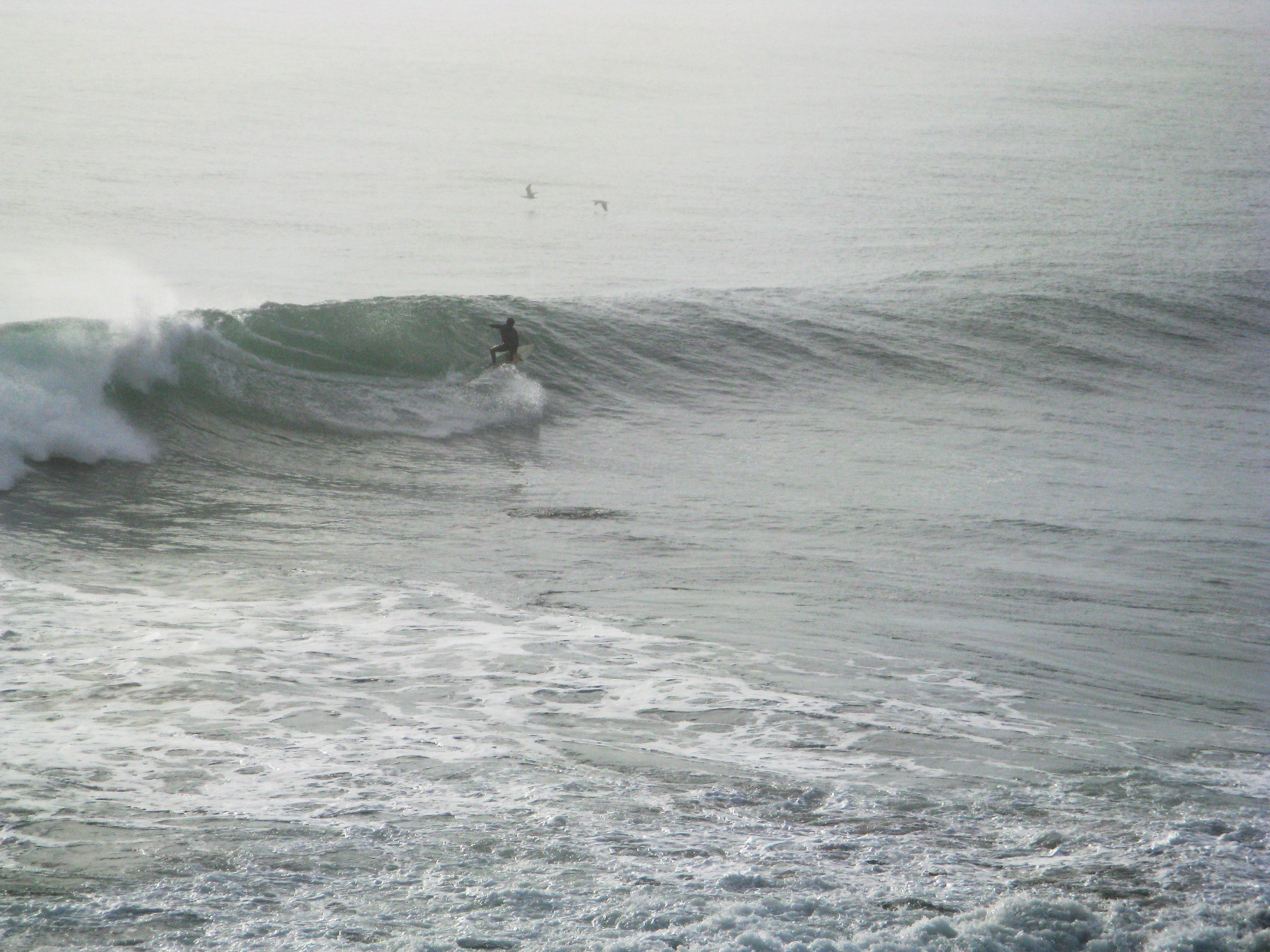
Surf in Punta de Lobos, Pichilemu, Chile.

Chile has many beaches for surfing, especially in the northern region where the weather conditions attract many surfers from all over the world. Except for the winter months (July and August) surfing is possible all year. The water temperature ranges from 15 to 20 °C (59 to 68 °F). Although the waves in central Chile are bigger, the waves in the north are stronger and are usually better suited for surfing. The cold waters of central and southern Chile can be brutal to surf, therefore, surfers adventuring into those areas are strongly advised on using a protective wetsuit to protect against the elements.

Some of the most popular surfing spots in Chile are:

== Pichilemu ==
Located south west of Santiago, Pichilemu is the number one spot for surfing in Chile. The town is the host of the annual national championships. This location offers something for every kind of surfer. Beginners usually try to catch their first waves at the beaches of Las Terrazas or La Puntilla. While more skilled usually hang out at Infiernillo, and only the most experienced surfers adventure into Punta de Lobos where the waves can get up to 6 meters high. Punta de Lobos is part of the Big Wave World Tour every year.

== Ritoque ==
Just north of Viña del Mar, Ritoque has the conditions for surfing. On the 13 kilometer long Ritoque beach waves can get as high as 7 meters.

== Arica ==
Close by the city of Arica is the Playa Gringo, whereas the name tells many US Americans go to surf. Even though there are spots with rocks in the water, the qualification for the national championship takes place there. Waves can get up to 4 meters high.

== Totoralillo ==
Totoralillo is located 12 km to the south of Coquimbo and 450 km at the north of Santiago. This Tahiti style beach, white sanded and clear water, offers all level surfers 6 different waves to enjoy: Derecharcha, Punta, Cabañas, Muro, Cacho and Pipe, right and left waves. It has a surf school, and different cabins where to stay.

== See also ==
- Sport in Chile
- Climate of Chile
- Tourism in Chile
