= La Villa, Pichilemu =

Coordinates: 34.518°S 71.975°W

La Villa
- Village
- La Villa
- Interactive map of La Villa
- Country: Chile
- Region: (O'Higgins Region) O'Higgins
- Province: (Cardenal Caro Province) Cardenal Caro
- Commune: Pichilemu

La Villa (Spanish for the village, pronounced [la ˈβiʝa]) is a Chilean village located in Pichilemu, Cardenal Caro Province.
