= Pichilemu TV =

Chilean TV channel

Canal 3 Pichilemu
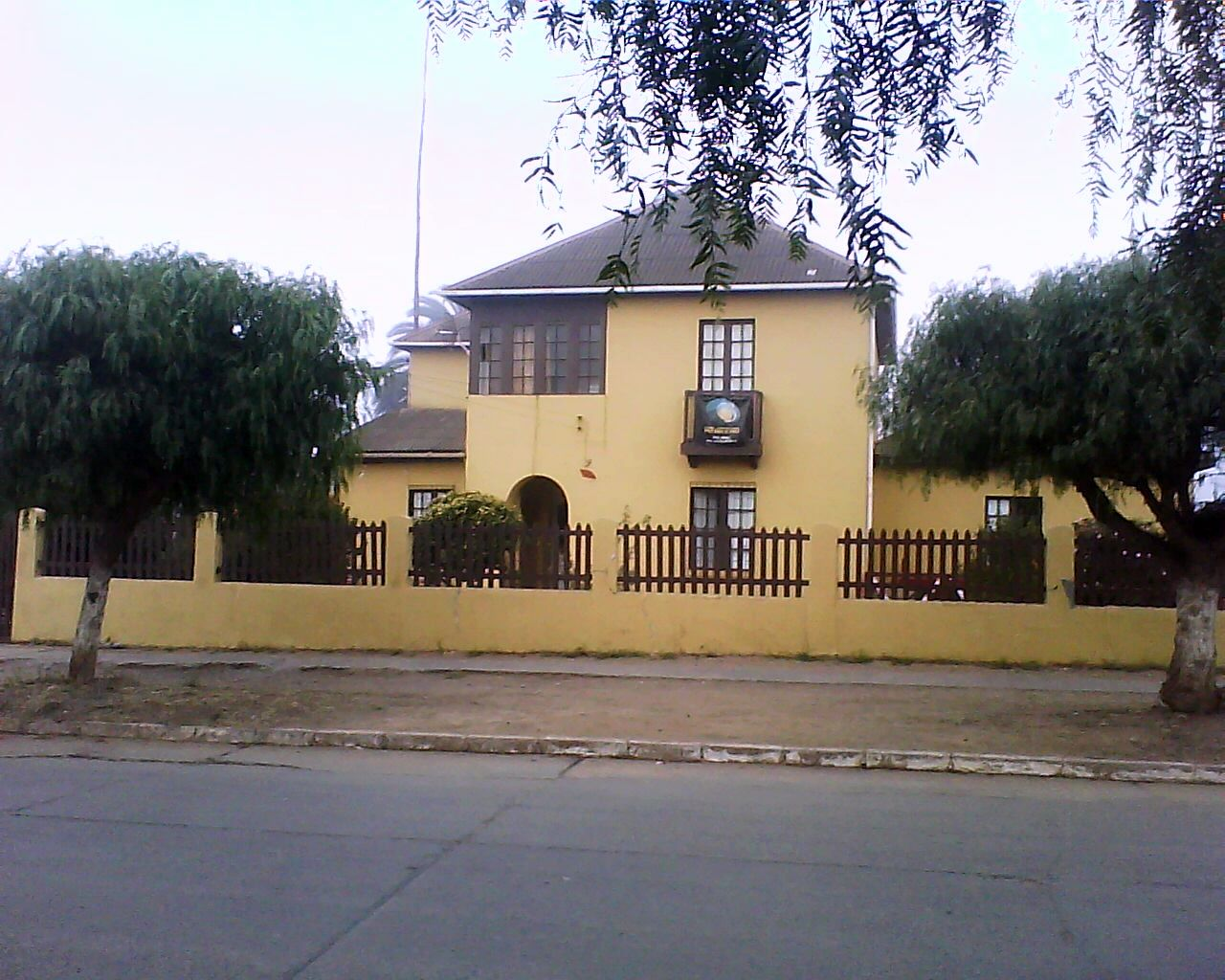
- Logo of Canal 3. Headquarters of Canal 3 Pichilemu, located in the former José Arraño Acevedo's house, in Pichilemu. Headquarters of Canal 3 Pichilemu, located in the former José Arraño Acevedo's house, in Pichilemu.
- Country: Chile
- Headquarters: Former José Arraño Acevedo's House, Pichilemu, O'Higgins Region

Programming
- Language: Spanish

Ownership
- Owner: Agrupación de Audiovisualistas de Pichilemu
- Key people: Fabricio Cáceres; Yovanny Moraga

History
- Launched: 2000
- Former names: Canal Inmaculada Concepción Pichilemu

Links
- Website: Pichilemu TV

Availability

Terrestrial
- Analog (Pichilemu): 3
- Analog (TV Cable Costa Azul): 35

Pichilemu TV (English: Channel 3 Pichilemu) is a Chilean TV channel with its headquarters located in Pichilemu, O'Higgins Region.

The channel was created in 2000, and its current director is Yovanny Moraga. The channel's owner is the Agrupación de Audiovisualistas de Pichilemu (English: Pichilemu Audiovisual Group), a non-profit organization.

The channel, along with Señal 3 La Victoria, helped with the creation of Mapuche TV, the first Mapudungun-speaking television channel in Chile, with headquarters in Panguipulli.
