= Radio Atardecer =

Pichilemu; Chile
- Broadcast area: Pichilemu, Santa Cruz, Curicó, Talca, Rancagua, Viña del Mar, and others
- Frequency: 107.3 FM
- Branding: FM

Programming
- Language: Spanish

Ownership
- Owner: Radio Atardecer

History
- First air date: 1986

Links
- Website: http://radioatardecer.com

Radio Atardecer is a radio station located in Pichilemu.
