= Bucalemu =

Coordinates: 34.6416°S 72.0433°W

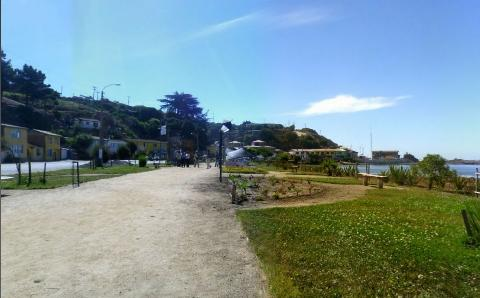
Bucalemu's square

Bucalemu (Mapudungun: big forest) is a Chilean town, located 37 kilometres (23 mi) from Pichilemu, in the Cardenal Caro Province, O'Higgins Region. It belongs to the Paredones commune. According to the 2017 census, Bucalemu has 824 inhabitants.

Bucalemu celebrates the Feast day of Saint Francis.

== See also ==
- List of towns in Chile
