= Daniel Ortúzar =

Chilean politician

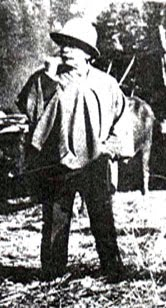

Deputy for Caupolicán
- In office 1903–1906

Deputy for San Fernando
- In office 1891–1903

Personal details
- Born: c. 1850 Santiago, Chile
- Died: 18 November 1932 (aged 81–82) Valparaíso, Chile
- Resting place: Cementerio Católico, Santiago, Chile
- Party: Conservative Party

Daniel Ortúzar Cuevas (c. 1850 – 19 November 1932) was a Chilean politician, who served as a deputy for San Fernando between 1891 and 1903, and deputy for Caupolicán —current Rengo— between 1903 and 1906.

== Biography ==
Ortúzar Cuevas was born in Santiago, Chile in about 1850. His parents were Vicente Ortúzar y Formas (1797–1867), farmer in the Almahue and San Antonio de Petrel haciendas, and Irene Cuevas Avaria (1819–1904), owner of the San Antonio de Petrel hacienda since his husband's death in 1867 and her death in 1904.

In 1888, Ortúzar participated as a member of a commission which collected funds to create the Pontifical Catholic University of Chile, based in Santiago. A Conservative, Ortúzar served four terms as a member of the Chamber of Deputies of Chile, representing San Fernando, between 1891 and 1903. He was elected deputy for Caupolicán —now Rengo— in 1903, and held the position until 1906. During his time as a deputy, he was a member of the Permanent Commission of Ecclesiastical Businesses (1891–1903) and the Permanent Commission of Charity and Worship (1903–1906).

He was a farmer at San Antonio de Petrel hacienda and at Cailloma quinta, from 1896 and until his death in 1932. During his time at San Antonio de Petrel, he built a dock for the commune of Pichilemu. Later, Ortúzar settled in Valparaíso, Valparaíso Region, and dedicated himself to "particular activities." He died in that city on 19 November 1932, unmarried, and was buried at the Cementerio Católico (Catholic Cemetery) in Santiago.
