= La Estrella, Chile =

La Estrella
- Town and Commune
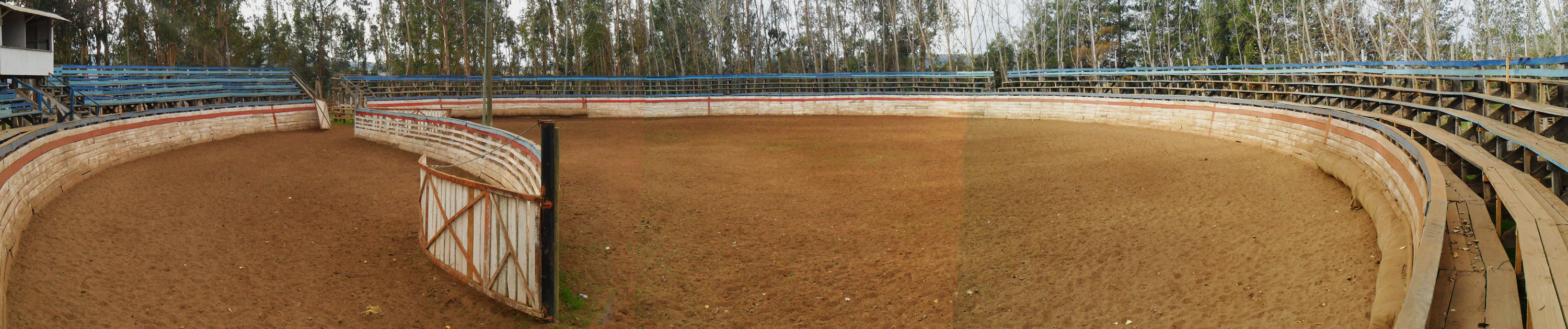
- Rodeo sport arena in La Estrella

- Map of La Estrella commune in O'Higgins Region Location in Chile
- Coordinates (town): 34°12′17″S 71°39′15″W
- Country: Chile
- Region: (O'Higgins Region) O'Higgins
- Province: (Cardenal Caro Province) Cardenal Caro

Government
  - Type: Municipality
  - Alcaldesa: Angélica Silva Arrué

Area
  - Total: 435 km^{2} (168 sq mi)
- Elevation: 186 m (610 ft)

Population (2012 Census)
  - Total: 3,327
  - Density: 7.65/km^{2} (19.8/sq mi)
  - Urban: 1,380
  - Rural: 2,841

Sex
  - Men: 2,766
  - Women: 1,455
- Time zone: UTC-4 (CLT)
  - Summer (DST): UTC-3 (CLST)
- Postal code: (+56) 72
- Website: Municipality of La Estrella

La Estrella is a Chilean town and commune in Cardenal Caro Province, O'Higgins Region.

== Demographics ==
According to the 2002 census of the National Statistics Institute, La Estrella spans an area of 435 km^{2} (168 sq mi) and has 4,221 inhabitants (2,766 men and 1,455 women). Of these, 1,380 (32.7%) lived in urban areas and 2,841 (67.3%) in rural areas. The population grew by 51.9% (1,442 persons) between the 1992 and 2002 censuses.

== Administration ==
As a commune, La Estrella is a third-level administrative division of Chile administered by a municipal council, headed by an alcalde who is directly elected every four years. The 2021-2024 alcalde is Angélica Silva Arrué.
