= Nancagua =

- City and Commune
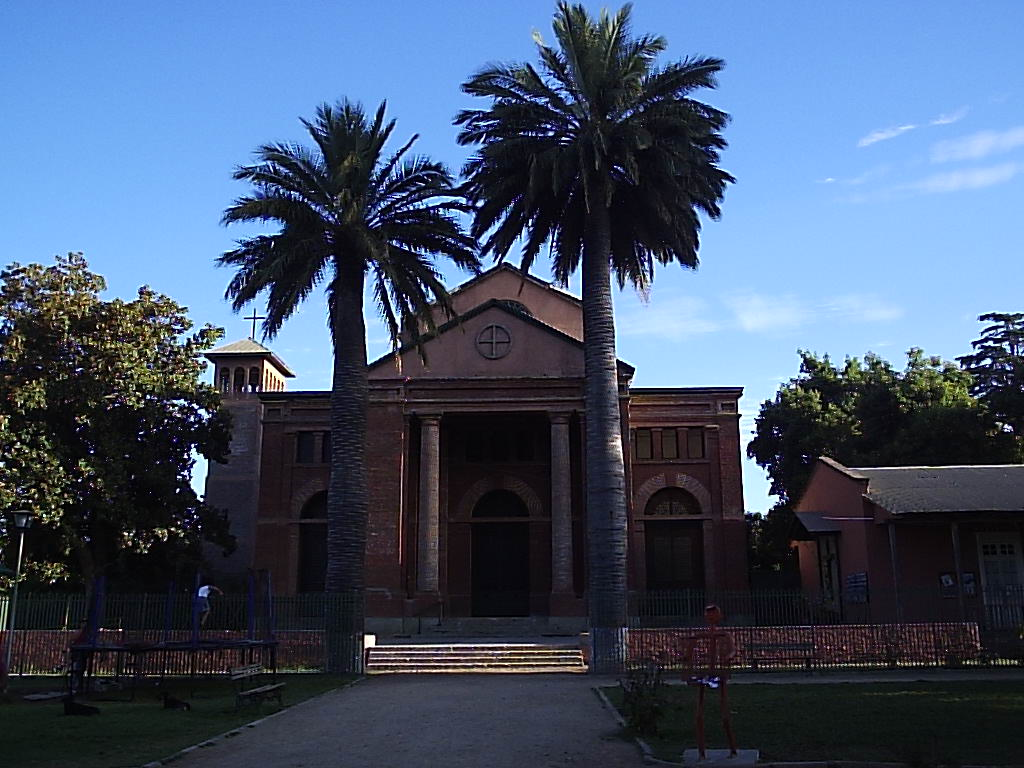
- Church of Nancagua

- Map of the Nancagua commune in the O'Higgins Region Location in Chile
- Coordinates: 34°40′S 71°13′W
- Country: Chile
- Region: (O'Higgins Region) O'Higgins
- Province: Colchagua

Government
  - Type: Municipality
  - Alcalde: Mario Bustamante

Area
  - Total: 111.3 km^{2} (43.0 sq mi)
- Elevation: 194 m (636 ft)

Population (2012 Census)
  - Total: 15,409
  - Density: 138.4/km^{2} (358.6/sq mi)
  - Urban: 9,264
  - Rural: 6,370

Sex
  - Men: 7,959
  - Women: 7,675
- Time zone: UTC-4 (CLT)
  - Summer (DST): UTC-3 (CLST)
- Area code: (+56) 72
- Website: Municipality of Nancagua

Nancagua (Spanish pronunciation: [naŋˈkaɣwa]) is a Chilean city and commune in Colchagua Province, O'Higgins Region.

== Demographics ==
According to the 2002 census conducted by the National Statistics Institute, Nancagua spanned an area of 111.3 km^{2} (43 sq mi) and had 15,634 inhabitants (7,959 men and 7,675 women). Of these, 9,264 (59.3%) lived in urban areas and 6,370 (40.7%) in rural areas. The population grew by 8.5% (1,220 persons) between the 1992 and 2002 censuses.

== Administration ==
As a commune, Nancagua is a third-level administrative division of Chile administered by a municipal council, headed by an alcalde who is directly elected every four years. The 2021-2024 alcalde is Mario Bustamante.
