= Palmilla =

- City and Commune
- Map of Palmilla commune in O'Higgins Region Location in Chile
- Coordinates (city): 34°36′15″S 71°21′30″W
- Country: Chile
- Region: (O'Higgins Region) O'Higgins
- Province: (Colchagua Province) Colchagua

Government
  - Type: Municipality
  - Alcaldesa: Gloria Paredes Valdés

Area
  - Total: 237.3 km^{2} (91.6 sq mi)
- Elevation: 153 m (502 ft)

Population (2012 Census)
  - Total: 11,844
  - Density: 49.91/km^{2} (129.3/sq mi)
  - Urban: 2,088
  - Rural: 9,112

Sex
  - Men: 5,825
  - Women: 5,375
- Time zone: UTC-4 (CLT)
  - Summer (DST): UTC-3 (CLST)
- Area code: (+56) 72
- Website: Municipality of Palmilla

Palmilla is a Chilean city and commune in Colchagua Province, O'Higgins Region.

== Demographics ==
According to the 2002 census of the National Statistics Institute, the commune of Palmilla spans an area of 237.3 km^{2} (92 sq mi) and has 11,200 inhabitants (5,825 men and 5,375 women). Of these, 2,088 (18.6%) lived in urban areas and 9,112 (81.4%) in rural areas. The population grew by 3.1% (336 persons) between the 1992 and 2002 censuses.

The urban area of Palmilla forms a conurbation with the city of Santa Cruz, to the south, totaling 20,691 inhabitants.

== Administration ==
As a commune, Palmilla is a third-level administrative division of Chile administered by a municipal council, headed by an alcalde who is directly elected every four years. The 2021-2024 alcaldesa is Gloria Paredes.
