= Paredones =

- Town and Commune
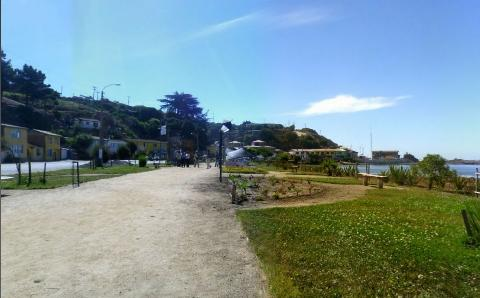
- Bucalemu, a village of Paredones.

- Map of Paredones commune in O'Higgins Region Location in Chile
- Coordinates (town): 34°39′05″S 71°53′59″W
- Country: Chile
- Region: (O'Higgins Region) O'Higgins
- Province: (Cardenal Caro Province) Cardenal Caro

Government
  - Type: Municipality
  - Alcalde: Antonio Carvacho

Area
  - Total: 561.5 km^{2} (216.8 sq mi)
- Elevation: 42 m (138 ft)

Population (2022 Census)
  - Total: 6,100
  - Density: 11/km^{2} (28/sq mi)
  - Urban: 2,195
  - Rural: 4,500

Sex
  - Men: 3,562
  - Women: 3,133
- Time zone: UTC-4 (CLT)
  - Summer (DST): UTC-3 (CLST)
- Area code: (+56) 72
- Website: Municipality of Paredones

Paredones is a Chilean town and commune in Cardenal Caro Province, O'Higgins Region.

== Demographics ==
According to the 2002 census of the National Statistics Institute, Paredones spans an area of 561.5 km^{2} (217 sq mi) and has 6,695 inhabitants (3,562 men and 3,133 women). Of these, 2,195 (32.8%) lived in urban areas and 4,500 (67.2%) in rural areas. The population grew by 1.1% (73 persons) between the 1992 and 2002 censuses.

== Administration ==
As a commune, Paredones is a third-level administrative division of Chile administered by a municipal council, headed by an alcalde who is directly elected every four years. The 2021-2024 alcalde is Antonio Carvacho Vargas.

== See also ==
- Bucalemu
- Cabeceras
