= Marchigüe =

Marchigüe Marchihue
- Town and Commune
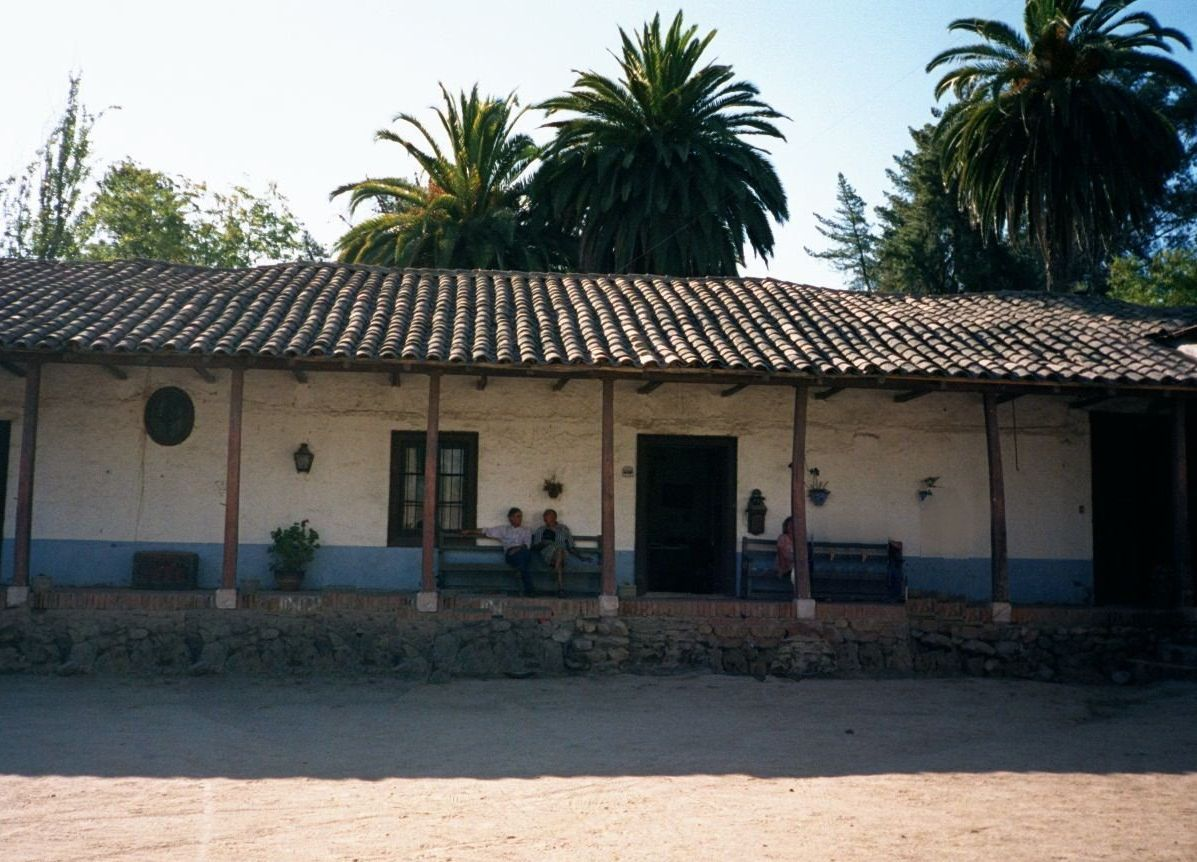
- Old house (casona) in Marchigüe.

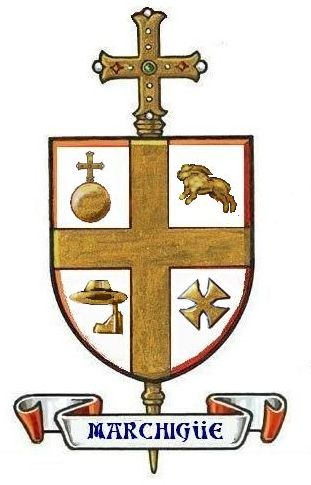
- Coat of arms Map of Marchigüe commune in O'Higgins Region Location in Chile
- Coordinates (city): 34°23′49″S 71°37′10″W
- Country: Chile
- Region: (O'Higgins Region) O'Higgins
- Province: (Cardenal Caro Province) Cardenal Caro

Government
  - Type: Municipality
  - Alcalde: Cristian Salinas Herrera

Area
  - Total: 659.9 km^{2} (254.8 sq mi)
- Elevation: 124 m (407 ft)

Population (2012 Census)
  - Total: 6,855
  - Density: 10.39/km^{2} (26.90/sq mi)
  - Urban: 2,208
  - Rural: 4,696

Sex
  - Men: 3,549
  - Women: 3,355
- Time zone: UTC-4 (CLT)
  - Summer (DST): UTC-3 (CLST)
- Area code: (+56) 72
- Website: Municipality of Marchigüe

Marchigüe (Spanish pronunciation: [maɾˈtʃiɣwe]), sometimes spelled Marchihue ([maɾˈtʃiwe]), is a Chilean town and commune in the Cardenal Caro Province of Chile's sixth region of O'Higgins.

== Demographics ==
According to the 2002 census of the National Statistics Institute, Marchigüe spans an area of 659.9 km^{2} (255 sq mi) and has 6,904 inhabitants (3,549 men and 3,355 women). Of these, 2,208 (32%) lived in urban areas and 4,696 (68%) in rural areas. The population grew by 11.2% (695 persons) between the 1992 and 2002 censuses.

== Administration ==
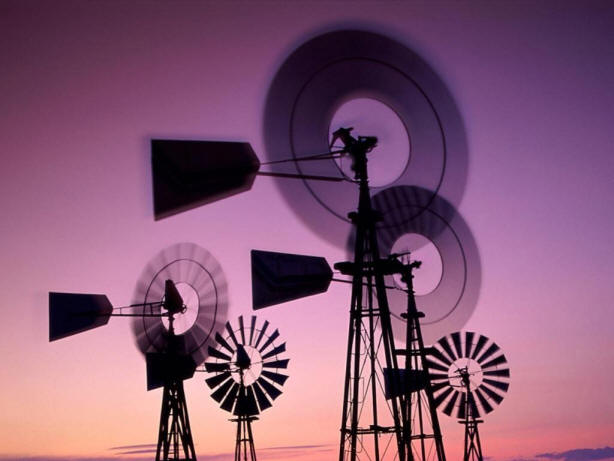
Wind wheels in Marchigüe

As a commune, Marchigüe is a third-level administrative division of Chile administered by a municipal council, headed by an alcalde who is directly elected every four years. The 2021-2024 alcalde is Héctor Cristian Salinas Herrera.
