= Cardenal Caro Province =

Cardenal Caro Province Provincia Cardenal Caro
- Province
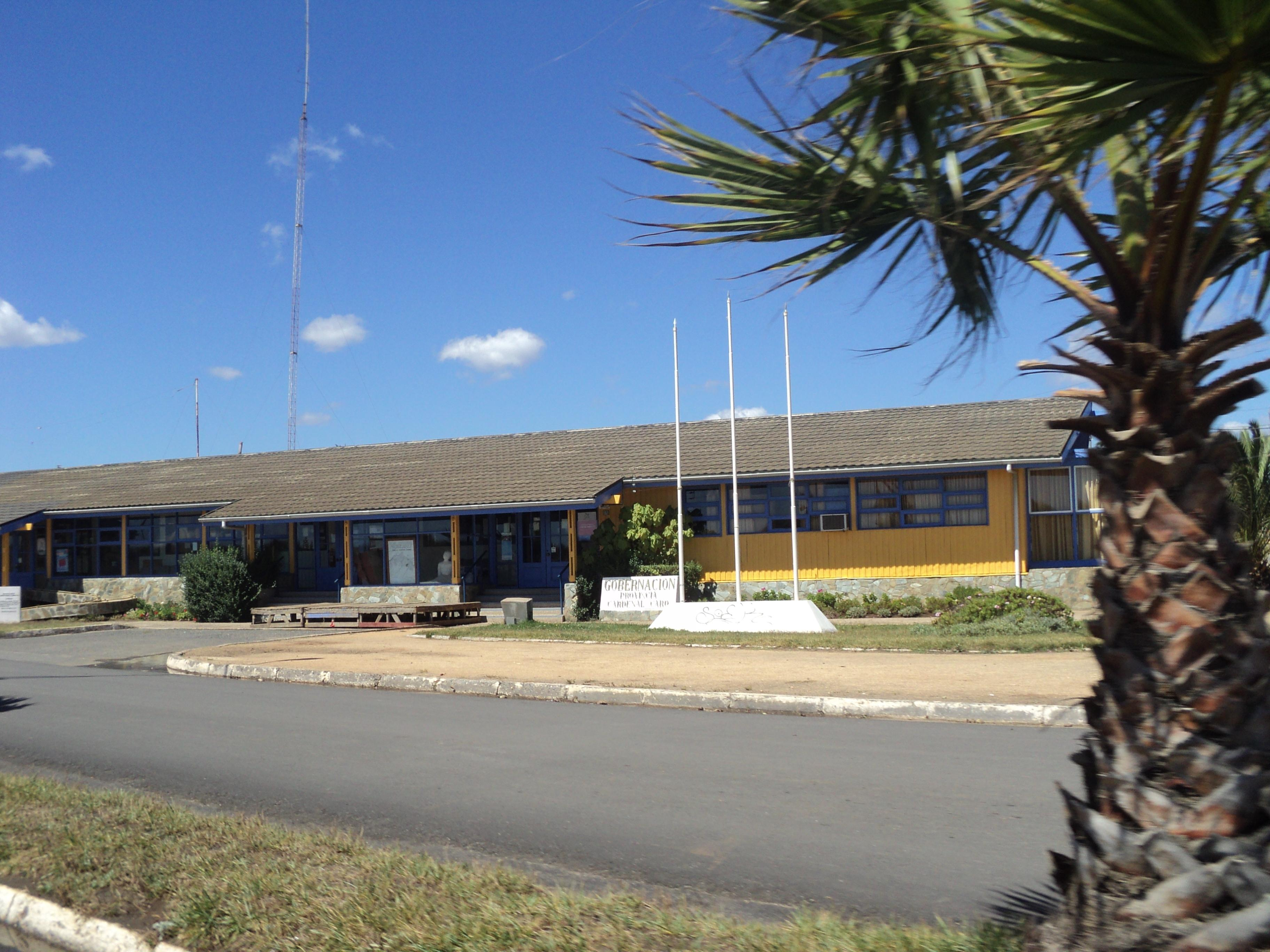
- The building that formerly housed the Government of Cardenal Caro Province, on March 12, 2011.

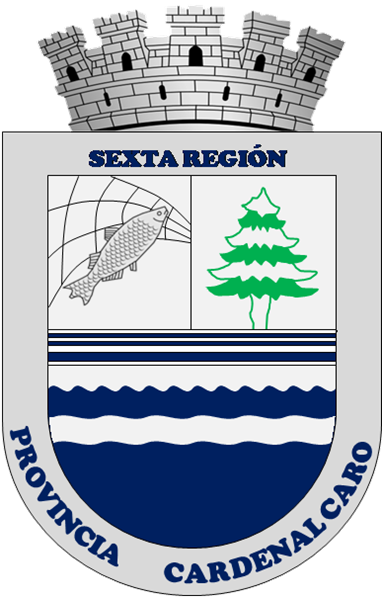
- Seal Coat of arms

- Location of Cardenal Caro Province in the Libertador General Bernardo O'Higgins Region

- Location in Chile
- Coordinates: 34°22′S 71°51′W
- Country: Chile
- Region: O'Higgins
- Founded: October 3, 1979
- Capital: Pichilemu
- Communes: List of 6: Pichilemu; La Estrella; Litueche; Marchigüe; Navidad; Paredones

Government
  - Type: Provincial
  - Presidential Provincial Delegate: Josefina Toro (Socialist Party)

Area
  - Total: 3,324.8 km^{2} (1,283.7 sq mi)

Population (2012 Census)
  - Total: 39,068
  - Density: 11.750/km^{2} (30.434/sq mi)
  - Urban: 18,433
  - Rural: 22,727

Sex
  - Men: 22,127
  - Women: 19,033
- Time zone: UTC-4 (CLT)
  - Summer (DST): UTC-3 (CLST)
- Area code: 56 + 72
- Website: Government of Cardenal Caro

Cardenal Caro Province (Spanish: Provincia Cardenal Caro) is one of the three provinces of the central Chilean region of O'Higgins (VI). The capital of Cardenal Caro is Pichilemu.

== Name ==
The province is named after Cardinal José María Caro Rodríguez, native of Pichilemu, and who was the first Cardinal of Chile.

== History ==
On July 13, 1973, President Salvador Allende Gossens decreed the creation of the Cardenal Caro Department. The decree was published in the Diario Oficial de la República de Chile in August of the same year, making it official. Marchigüe was declared the capital. However, the coup d'état that occurred in September of that year made the decree "dead text".

The province of Cardenal Caro was created on October 3, 1979 by General Augusto Pinochet. The communes of Litueche (formerly El Rosario), La Estrella, Marchigüe, Paredones, and Pichilemu, originally from Colchagua Province; and Navidad, originally from San Antonio Province, formed the province.

== Administration ==
As a province, Cardenal Caro is a second-level administrative division of Chile, governed by a provincial delegate who is appointed by the president. Before 2021, the province was administered by the governor of Cardenal Caro, also appointed by the president of the Republic. Since that year, it is administered by the presidential provincial delegate of Cardenal Caro. The province is composed by six communes (Spanish: comunas), each of which is governed by a popularly elected alcalde.

=== Communes ===
Communes of Cardenal Caro
1. Navidad
2. Litueche
3. La Estrella
4. Pichilemu
5. Marchigüe
6. Paredones

== Geography and demography ==
According to the 2002 census by the National Statistics Institute (INE), the province spans an area of 3,324.7 km^{2} (1,284 sq mi) and had a population of 41,160 inhabitants (22,127 men and 19,033 women), giving it a population density of 12.4/km^{2} (32/sq mi). Between the 1992 and 2002 censuses, the population grew by 11.2% (4,151 persons). persons).

== See also ==
- List of schools in Cardenal Caro
