= Carlos Rojas Pavez =

Chilean politician (1906–1994)

28th Mayor of Pichilemu
- In office 21 May 1967 – 21 May 1971
- Preceded by: Carlos Echazarreta Iñíguez
- Succeeded by: Washington Saldías Fuentealba

Municipal secretary of Pichilemu
- In office August 1937 – May 1967
- Preceded by: Miguel Larravide Blanco
- Succeeded by: Gustavo Parraguez Galarce

Personal details
- Born: 16 October 1906 Pichilemu, Chile
- Died: 23 August 1994 (aged 87) Santiago, Chile
- Party: Radical Party
- Spouse: Guacolda Avilés Pavez
- Children: Patricia, Carlos, Mario, Marcelo, Verónica
- Occupation: Civil servant, journalist

Carlos Ignacio Rojas Pavez (16 October 1906 – 23 August 1994) was the 28th Mayor of the commune of Pichilemu, office which he held between May 1967 and May 1971. For almost three decades, Rojas Pavez worked as the municipal secretary of Pichilemu, and in 1944, along with José Arraño Acevedo and Miguel Larravide Blanco, founded Pichilemu, a newspaper focused in local stories.

== Biography ==
Rojas Pavez was born on 16 October 1906 in Pichilemu, in current Cardenal Caro Province, Region of O'Higgins, Chile, to Samuel Rojas Polanco and Flor Irene Pavez Díaz. He completed his primary studies in a school of Chimbarongo, Colchagua. Rojas later enrolled to schools in San Fernando and Santiago de Chile to complete his secondary studies.

=== Political career ===
Rojas Pavez first became involved in politics when he was appointed as municipal secretary of the commune of Pichilemu in August 1937 by the Pichilemu City Council, presided by mayor Humberto Llanos Martínez and composed of regidores Lorenzo Arraño Ortíz, Carlos Silva Prado, Vicente Richard, and Alberto Morales Moraga. He remained in that position until May 1967, when he resigned to run for regidor of Pichilemu.

Eventually elected a regidor, representing the Radical Party, he was elected by fellow regidores the 28th Mayor of Pichilemu; his council was composed of Flavio Álvarez Jorquera (segundo regidor), Mario Moraga Cáceres, Carlos Echazarreta Iñiguez, and Washington Saldías Fuentealba (primer regidor), and his term lasted until May 1971, being succeeded by Saldías Fuentealba. Rojas Pavez's mayorship is remembered for the construction of the Arturo Prat Square (Plaza Arturo Prat), performed in 1967.

=== Pichilemu newspaper ===
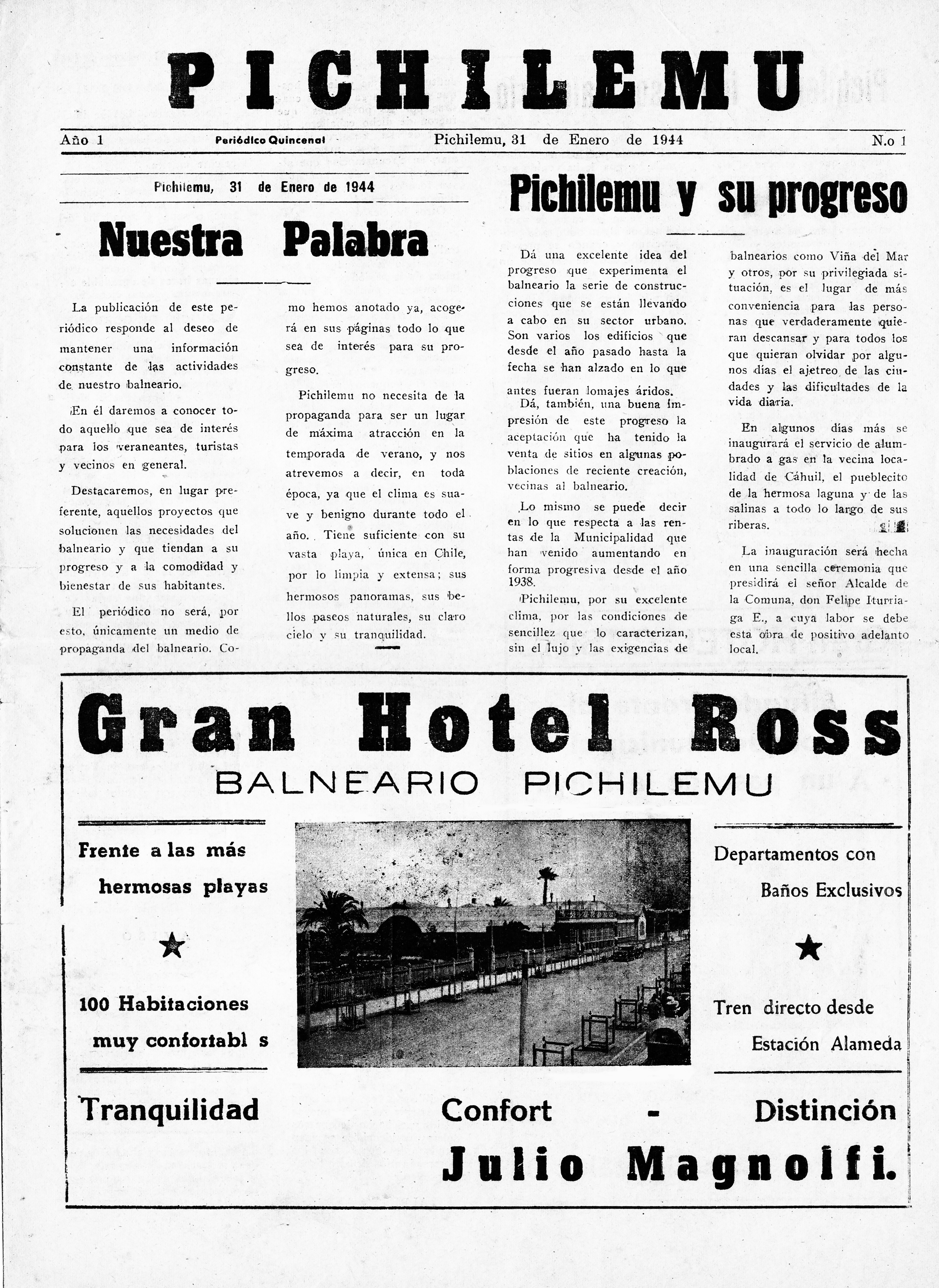
Front page of the first edition of Pichilemu, dated 31 January 1944

By the 1940s, Rojas Pavez had the idea of publishing a newspaper in Pichilemu, inspired in the previous publication of two local newspapers by sanfernandino businessman and journalist Augusto A. Ramírez O.: El Puerto, founded on 16 January 1908, and El Marino, founded on 14 January 1917. With the help of journalist José Arraño Acevedo and Miguel Larravide Blanco, Rojas Pavez founded Pichilemu on 25 January 1944. With Arraño and Larravide, Rojas sent, as required by law, the governor of Santa Cruz Department a "publication declaration" (declaración de publicación), with a copy to a department of the National Library of Chile. The group published Pichilemu for the first time six days later, on 31 January 1944, and seven other editions were published through that year, reporting World War II events and describing the passing-by of Allies ships through the coast of Pichilemu. Rojas was described in a Pichilemu News article commemorating the 65th anniversary of the founding of Pichilemu as "proud[ly] giving his commune an informative written tool so many times dreamed of." (Note: Original quote in Spanish language: "orgulloso daba a su comuna un órgano informativo escrito tantas veces soñado".) A ninth edition was published in 1949, but because of "low support of the local commerce, and the blind vision of the [local] authorities," Rojas quit the project.

Rojas Pavez's project remained dormant until 1986, when local journalist Washington Saldías asked Rojas to give him the rights to publish a newspaper under the name and legal status of Pichilemu. Rojas gave Saldías the rights, and the latter eventually published the tenth edition of Pichilemu on 31 January 1986, on the 42nd anniversary of the newspaper's founding. The newspaper was published until 1990, completing 29 new editions, and 38 in total since 1944. In 1996, one new edition of Pichilemu was published by lawyer Carlos Carmona Plá, who purchased temporary rights to the name. Washington Saldías would, in January 2000, turn Pichilemu into an online newspaper by creating Pichilemu News which, as of May 2013, still credits Rojas Pavez as its founder. Pichilemu News is, according to its editor, the oldest online newspaper of the Region of O'Higgins.

== Personal life ==
Rojas Pavez married Guacolda Avilés Pavez. As of the time of writing of his profile in Pichilemu, on 31 January 1986, Rojas was a widower. The Rojas Avilés couple had five children: Patricia, Carlos, Mario, Marcelo, and Verónica.

He died in La Reina, a commune of Santiago, Chile, on 23 August 1994, at age 87.

== Works ==
- Grez-Cañete, Diego; Rojas Pavez, Carlos (2017). Crónicas de Pichilemu: una mirada al pasado, un vistazo al presente (in Spanish). Pichilemu, Chile: El Marino Producciones. ISBN 978-956-9757-04-4. (posthumous)

== Notes ==
Political offices
| Preceded by Carlos Echazarreta Iñiguez | Mayor of Pichilemu; 1967–1971 | Succeeded by Washington Saldías Fuentealba |
| Preceded by Miguel Larravide Blanco | Municipal secretary of Pichilemu; 1937–1967 | Succeeded by Gustavo Parraguez Galarce |
