= Apoyo a la Seguridad Ciudadana =

Public Safety Agency of Pichilemu Apoyo a la Seguridad Ciudadana de Pichilemu
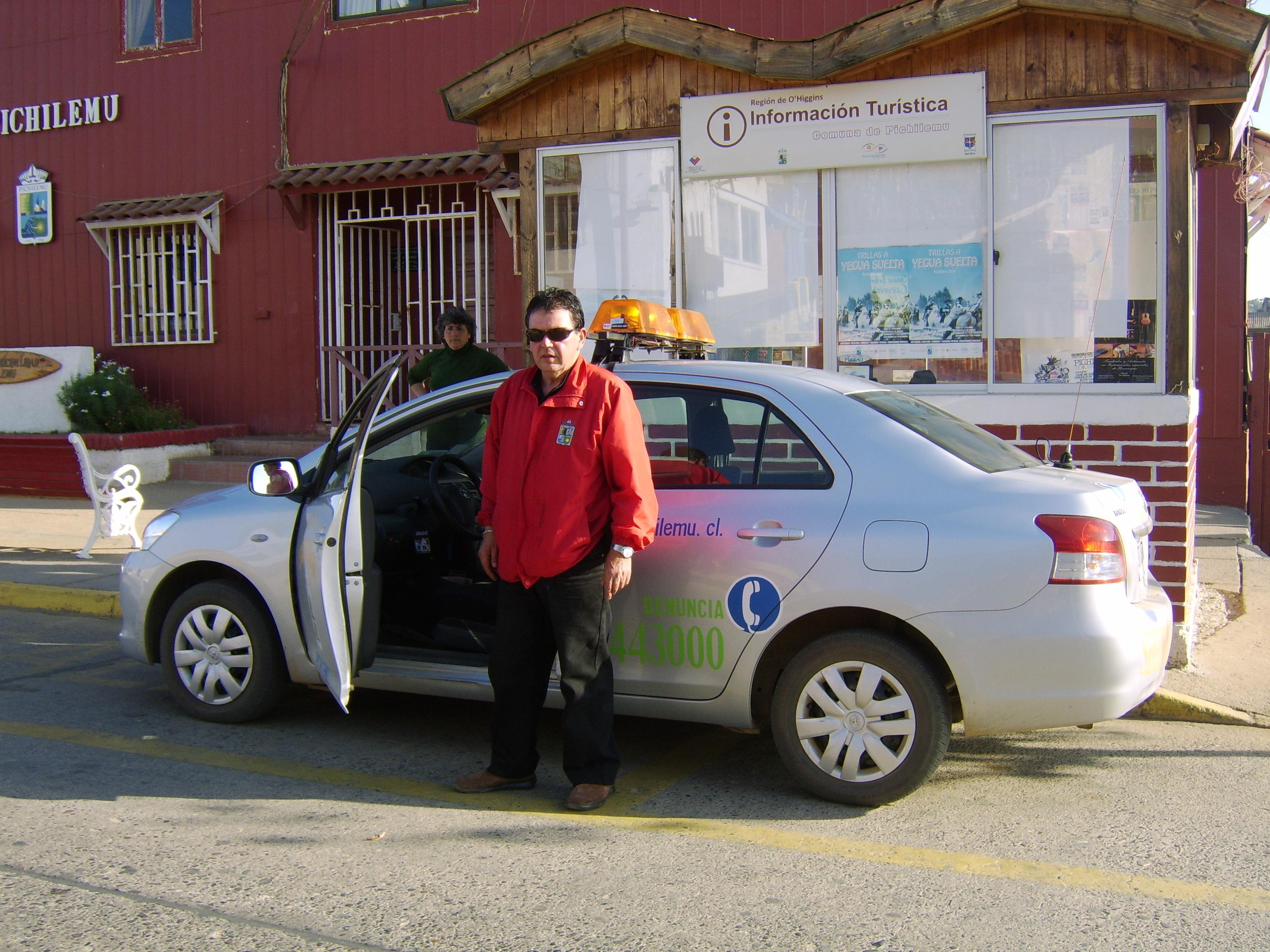
- A Seguridad Ciudadana employee with their patrolling car, in May 2010.

- Coat of arms of Pichilemu.

Jurisdictional structure
- Operations jurisdiction: Pichilemu, O'Higgins, CHI
- Legal jurisdiction: State
- Governing body: Municipality of Pichilemu

Operational structure
- Headquarters: Angel Gaete street, Pichilemu

Apoyo a la Seguridad Ciudadana de Pichilemu (English: Public Safety Agency of Pichilemu) is a public safety agency of Pichilemu, a city in central Chile on the coast of the Pacific Ocean. This agency is directed by the Mayor of Pichilemu, Roberto Córdova.

== Emergency Contact Information ==
- Emergency Hotline: 1450 (Toll-free within the commune)
- Alternative Mobile Number: +56 9 4042 4739
- Headquarters Address: Laura Polanco Nº 448, Pichilemu, O'Higgins, Chile

== History ==
The agency was created in January 2010 by Mayor of Pichilemu Roberto Córdova together with the Investigations Police of Chile, Carabineros de Chile, the Chilean Army, the Pichilemu Fire Bureau and Corporación Nacional Forestal.

The agency started with one vehicle, with 15 inspectors trained by Carabineros de Chile. Roberto Córdova told El Tipógrafo that "the agency was created because several people asked him to improve the public and citizen safety."

The agency was initially proposed within a plan called "Verano Seguro" (English: Safe Summer), by the Pichilemu Hospital, Investigations Police of Chile, the Chilean Army, amidst other organizations.
