= Washington Saldías Fuentealba =

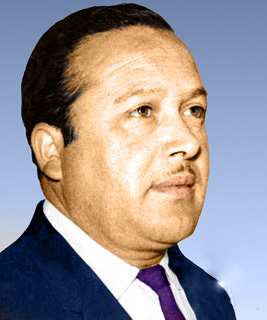

29th Mayor of Pichilemu
- In office 21 May 1971 – 29 September 1973
- Preceded by: Carlos Rojas Pavez
- Succeeded by: Carlos Echazarreta Iñiguez

Personal details
- Born: 6 September 1927 Santiago, Chile
- Died: 31 October 1989 (aged 62) Ñuñoa, Chile
- Party: Socialist Party of Chile (PS)
- Occupation: Civil servant

Washington Saldías Fuentealba (6 September 1927 – 31 October 1989) was the 29th Mayor of the Chilean commune of Pichilemu, office which he held between May 1971 and September 1973: his term was interrupted by the 1973 Chilean coup d'état, which put General Augusto Pinochet in the power of the country, and who later appointed Carlos Echazarreta Iñiguez as the successor of Saldías. Saldías was also regidor of the commune of Pichilemu between 1963 and 1971, and a founding member of the Club Aéreo de Pichilemu (Aerial Club of Pichilemu).

== Biography ==
=== Political career ===
Washington Saldías was elected regidor of Pichilemu for the first time in 1963, representing the Socialist Party of Chile. He shared the council office for the 1963–67 term with Manuel Córdova Morales, Héctor Greene Valverde, Osvaldo Vidal Vidal, and mayor Carlos Echazarreta Iñiguez. He was re-elected for the 1967–71 term, holding the regidor office with Flavio Alvarez Jorquera, Mario Moraga Cáceres, Carlos Echazarreta Iñiguez, and mayor Carlos Rojas Pavez.

Saldías Fuentealba was elected mayor of Pichilemu for the 1973–75 term, and took office on 21 May 1973, becoming the first Socialist politician to become mayor of Pichilemu. His council was composed of Osvaldo Vidal Vidal, Jorge Díaz García, Francisco Lorca Espinoza and Carlos Echazarreta Iñiguez. Among his work as mayor of the commune, he started the construction of the Avenida Costanera, an avenue which now borders the coast of Pichilemu; additionally, the Plaza Arturo Prat (Arturo Prat Square, constructed during the mayorship of Carlos Rojas Pavez, had its condition improved by the installation of streetlamps, planting of new trees, and cement benches.

Saldías also constructed roads connecting the southern parts of the commune, including the beach of Punta de Lobos, the neighborhood of Playa Hermosa, and the village of Cáhuil, with the urban center. He was described in a session of the Chamber of Deputies of Chile as a "very active man, very hard working and much worried of his commune's problems."

Saldías' term, however, was interrupted by the 1973 coup d'état, which put General Augusto Pinochet Ugarte presiding a government junta which, on 29 September 1973, expelled Saldías Fuentealba from the mayoral office and put in his place Christian Democrat regidor Carlos Echazarreta Iñiguez, who held office until November of that year.

=== Other work ===
Saldías is a founding member of the Club Aéreo de Pichilemu (Aerial Club of Pichilemu), whose founding took place on 2 November 1964.

== Personal life ==
Washington Saldías is the father of Washington Saldías González, councilor of Pichilemu between 1996 and 2004, and Antonio Saldías, known by his pen name Don Antonio de Petrel, who has written several books on the history of the communes of Cardenal Caro Province.

== Legacy ==
In December 1991, and as part of the celebrations and activities for the celebration of the centennial of the creation of the commune of Pichilemu, mayor René Maturana renamed several streets "whose names were repeated" to "names of people relevant in [the local] history". As a result, Calle Cardenal Caro (Cardenal Caro Street) in Ross neighborhood was renamed to Calle Alcalde Washington Saldías Fuentealba (Alcalde Washington Saldías Fuentealba street).

Political offices
Preceded by Carlos Rojas Pavez	Mayor of Pichilemu; 1971–1973	Succeeded by Carlos Echazarreta Iñiguez
