= Colchagua =

Colchagua (Mapudungun for "cornfield") may refer to:

== Geography and hydrography ==
Places in Chile:

- Colchagua Province, province in O'Higgins Region
- Colchagua (historical province), a province (region) of Chile between 1826 and 1976
- Colchagua Valley, a valley which comprises the territories of Colchagua Province and Cardenal Caro Province, both in O'Higgins Region
- Colchagua Valley (wine region) in O'Higgins Region
- Colchagua, O'Higgins, a village located near San Fernando, O'Higgins Region
- Colchagua, Quillón, Bío Bío, a village located in the commune of Quillón, Bío Bío Region
- Colchagua, San Rosendo, Bío Bío, a village located in the commune of San Rosendo, Bío Bío Region
- Colchagua Estuary, which flows into the Bío Bío River

== Institutions ==
- Colegio Valle de Colchagua, a school in San Fernando, Chile
- Colchagua Club de Deportes, a football club based in San Fernando
