= Carlos Echazarreta Iñiguez =

Chilean politician (born 1934)

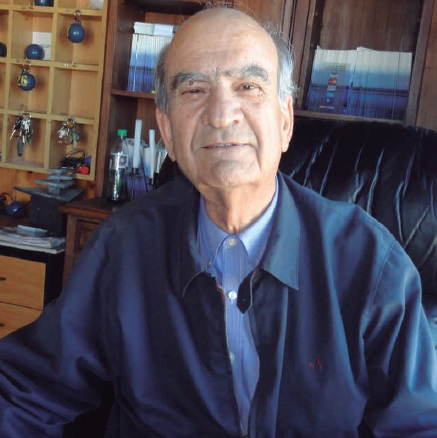

27th and 30th Mayor of Pichilemu
- In office 29 September 1973 – 10 November 1973
- President: Augusto Pinochet Ugarte (Government Junta)
- Preceded by: Washington Saldías Fuentealba
- Succeeded by: Mario Urrutia Carrasco
- In office 19 May 1963 – 21 May 1967
- Preceded by: Basilio Sánchez Beguiristain
- Succeeded by: Carlos Rojas Pavez

Personal details
- Born: 11 November 1934 (age 91) Recoleta, Chile
- Party: Regionalist Party of the Independents (PRI)
- Spouse: Eliana Guzmán Lyon
- Occupation: Civil servant, farmer

Carlos José Ramón Echazarreta Iñiguez (born 11 November 1934) is a Chilean politician who served as the 27th and 30th Mayor of the commune of Pichilemu. He first held office from May 1963 to May 1967, and through the early months of the Augusto Pinochet military regime, between September and November 1973. In 1967, he was succeeded by Carlos Rojas Pavez, and in 1973, he was succeeded by Mario Urrutia Carrasco. Echazarreta was also a regidor of Pichilemu for several terms between 1959 and 1973.

== Biography ==
Carlos Echazarreta Iñíguez was born on 11 November 1934 in Recoleta, Santiago Metropolitan Region, Chile, to Carlos Echazarreta Larraín—21st Mayor of Pichilemu—and María Iñíguez Infante. Like his father, Carlos José Ramón became a farmer. He completed his secondary studies at Colegio San Ignacio.

=== Political career ===
In 1959, Echazarreta Iñiguez was elected regidor of the commune of Pichilemu, representing the United Conservative Party, for a four-year term, in which he shared office with Héctor Greene Valverde, Alberto Araneda Concha, and Sergio Morales Retamal, during the mayorship of Basilio Sánchez Beguiristain. He was elected mayor of Pichilemu on 19 May 1963; his council was composed by Manuel Córdova Morales, Héctor Greene Valverde, Osvaldo Vidal Vidal, and Washington Saldías Fuentealba. In 1967, now as a Christian Democrat, he was elected regidor for the mayorship of Carlos Rojas Pavez, and shared office with Washington Saldías Fuentealba, Flavio Álvarez Jorquera, and Mario Moraga Cáceres. Once again, he was re-elected regidor of Pichilemu in 1971 for the 1971–75 term, which was interrupted by the coup d'état of Augusto Pinochet Ugarte in 1973. During that term, Echazarreta shared the regidor office with Osvaldo Vidal Vidal, Jorge Díaz García, and Francisco Lorca Espinoza, through the mayorship of Washington Saldías Fuentealba. On 29 September 1973, he was appointed by the government junta as mayor of Pichilemu, and held the office until 10 November 1973, when a decreed was made to appoint Mario Urrutia Carrasco in his place.

In 2012, he returned to the political scene of Pichilemu by running for councilor of Pichilemu for the Regionalist Party of the Independents (PRI). In the election, Echazarreta Iñiguez obtained 98 votes (1.37%) out of 7,169, and was not elected.

=== Other work ===
Echazarreta Iñiguez was a founding member of the Aerial Club of Pichilemu (Club Aéreo de Pichilemu, CAP), of which he was one of its director and, at some point, its president.

== Personal life ==
According to Guillermo de la Cuadra Gormaz's 1982 book Familias chilenas (Chilean families), Carlos Echazarreta Iñiguez married in first nuptials with María Inés Bezanilla Infante; the couple divorced in 1996 and Echazarreta later married Eliana Guzmán Lyon. Echazarreta has had children in his marriages.

Political offices
Preceded by Basilio Sánchez Beguiristain; Washington Saldías Fuentealba	Mayor of Pichilemu; 1963–1967; 1973	Succeeded by Carlos Rojas Pavez; Mario Urrutia Carrasco
