= Basilio Sánchez =

Chilean physician (1903–1992)

26th Mayor of Pichilemu
- In office 19 May 1960 – 19 May 1963
- Preceded by: Felipe Iturriaga Esquivel
- Succeeded by: Carlos Echazarreta Iñiguez

Personal details
- Born: 1903
- Occupation: Physician

Basilio Sánchez Beguiristáin (1903 – 1992) was a Chilean physician. Between May 1960 and May 1963, Sánchez was the 26th Mayor of the commune of Pichilemu. He was also one of the founding members of the Pichilemu Fire Department (Cuerpo de Bomberos de Pichilemu) and was, for decades, the director of Pichilemu Hospital.

== Biography ==
Little is known of Sánchez Beguiristáin before his arrival in Pichilemu in 1933, at age 30. According to Historia Hospital de Pichilemu from the Chilean Ministry of Health Library, Sánchez arrived "on holidays [...] and like others was delighted by [Pichilemu's] beauty and quietness", and decided to stay in Pichilemu to work as a doctor; he was contracted by mayor Felipe Iturriaga Esquivel. Between 1933 and 1940, he directed the Dispensario San Rafael, Pichilemu's first health organization, created years before by fellow physician Eugenio Díaz Lira. On 1 November 1940, the Ministry of Health created the Pichilemu Relief House (Casa de Socorros de Pichilemu), and designated Basilio Sánchez as its First Chief. The relief house was elevated to the category of hospital in the 1960s, and became Pichilemu Hospital, with Sánchez continuing as its director.

Former mayor Felipe Iturriaga and Sánchez after his naming as Illustrious Son of Pichilemu

In 1960, Sánchez was elected Mayor of Pichilemu, and took office on 19 May. The directorship of Pichilemu Hospital, through his mayorship, was delegated to a doctor of Italian origin surnamed Matasi. His council was composed of the regidores Héctor Greene Valverde, Carlos Echazarreta Iñiguez, Alberto Araneda Concha, and Sergio Morales Retamal. He held the mayoralty until 19 May 1963. Upon the completion of his mayoral term, he returned to the direction of the local hospital, and continued in that role until 1976. Just before resigning, Sánchez brought to the hospital two physicians from the University of Concepción, who were welcomed in a ceremony by then mayor Eduardo Parraguez Galarce. In that ceremony, Sánchez was named Illustrious Son of Pichilemu (Hijo Ilustre de Pichilemu), for "working in the healthcare in Pichilemu for almost fifty years." Following his resignation as director of Pichilemu Hospital, Sánchez retired.

Sánchez was a founding member of the Pichilemu Fire Department (Cuerpo de Bomberos de Pichilemu), which was established on 4 December 1945. He was named an honorary director of the fire department. Sánchez was also Superintendent of the Pichilemu Fire Department between 1950 and 1951, and between 1961 and 1969. Moreover, he is recorded as a founding member of the Pichilemu Flying Club (Club Aéreo de Pichilemu); the club was founded on 2 November 1964.

Political offices
Preceded by Felipe Iturriaga Esquivel	Mayor of Pichilemu; 1960–1963	Succeeded by Carlos Echazarreta Iñiguez
