= José Lino Vargas =

Chilean politician (1930–2024)

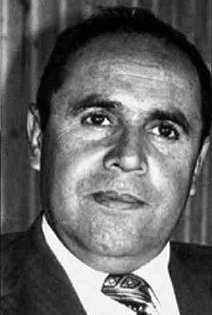

33rd Mayor of Pichilemu
- In office 23 May 1979 – 20 April 1981
- President: Augusto Pinochet Ugarte (Government Junta)
- Preceded by: Eduardo Parraguez Galarce
- Succeeded by: Julio Waidele Wolff

Personal details
- Born: 6 March 1930 Pichilemu, Chile
- Died: 1 December 2024 (aged 94) Pichilemu, Chile
- Spouse: Ruth Claudina del Tránsito Waman Becerra

José Lino Vargas Jorquera (6 March 1930 – 1 December 2024) was a Chilean politician. He was the 33rd Mayor of the commune of Pichilemu, office which he held between 1979 and 1981, after being appointed by the government junta presided by General Augusto Pinochet. The Cardenal Caro Province, of which Pichilemu is the capital, was created during Vargas' term as mayor. Vargas was also a founding member of the Club Aéreo de Pichilemu (Aerial Club of Pichilemu); Vargas was an experienced pilot.

== Life and career ==
=== Background ===
José Lino Vargas was born on 6 March 1930 in Pichilemu, in current Cardenal Caro Province, Region of O'Higgins, Chile. His parents were Lino de los Ángeles Vargas Martínez and Elena del Carmen Jorquera Cifuentes. Vargas married Ruth Claudina del Tránsito Waman Becerra (born 10 April 1949) in Rancagua on 4 December 1968.

Vargas died in Pichilemu on 1 December 2024, at the age of 94.

=== Political career ===
Vargas Jorquera was appointed Mayor of Pichilemu, by decree of the government junta presided by General Augusto Pinochet, in 1979. He succeeded Eduardo Parraguez Galarce. Through his term, the Cardenal Caro Province (of which Pichilemu became capital) was created. A strong rainstorm affected Pichilemu in 1981, which left the commune with no communication; Vargas, as an experienced pilot from the local aerial club, took on his plane to Marchigüe for the local authorities to inform the situation of Pichilemu.

President of the Centro de Hijos y Amigos de Pichilemu Washington Saldías organised a Regional Contest of Painting, to create a Municipal Pinacotheca, sponsored by mayor Vargas Jorquera. Although some works have been kept in Pichilemu City Hall offices, the pinacotheca was never created.

He was succeeded by Julio Waidele Wolff in 1981.

=== Career as pilot ===
Vargas Jorquera was a founding member of the Club Aéreo de Pichilemu (Aerial Club of Pichilemu), whose founding took place on 2 November 1964.

On 19 December 1969, a Boeing 727 plane, making a Santiago-Arica-Santiago trip for LAN, was hijacked by extremist Patricio Alarcón, who took controller of aerial traffic Vargas Jorquera as hostage; pilots Juan Jofré, Luis Galdámez, Amaron Bamón and co-pilot Víctor Escudero obeyed Alarcón's orders to travel to Cuba. Once they arrived at Habana, Alarcón was detained by local authorities.

Political offices
Preceded by Eduardo Parraguez Galarce	Mayor of Pichilemu; 1979–1981	Succeeded by Julio Waidele Wolff
