= Carlos Echazarreta =

Carlos Echazarreta is the name of two Chilean politicians:

- Carlos Echazarreta Larraín, 21st Mayor of Pichilemu (1947–50)
- Carlos Echazarreta Iñiguez, 27th and 30th Mayor of Pichilemu (1963–67; 1973)
