= Mayors of Pichilemu timeline =

The timeline shows changes of the head of the executive branch of the municipality of Pichilemu from its creation in May 1894 until today.

== Notable ==
- Presidents died before the end of term:

Serafín López Lizana

- the shortest and longest terms:

Osvaldo Sotomayor Ilabaca (9 days) and José María Caro Martínez (11 years)

- Most non-consecutive periods:

Francisco Javier Asalgado, Sergio Morales Retamal, Carlos Echazarreta Iñiguez (two), and Felipe Iturriaga Esquivel (three)

== See also ==
- Mayor of Pichilemu
