= Washington Saldías =

Washington Saldías may refer to:

- Washington Saldías Fuentealba (1927–1989), mayor of Pichilemu between 1971 and 1973
- Washington Saldías González (born 1949), former councilor of Pichilemu and founder of online newspaper Pichilemu News
