= Moraga =

Moraga may refer to:

== Locations ==
- Moraga, California, US
- Moraga Adobe, Orinda, California, US
- Moraga Estate, Los Angeles, California, US
- Moraga Formation, California, US
- Plaza Moraga, Manila, Philippines

== People ==
- Alberto Morales Moraga, Chilean politician
- Cherríe Moraga (born 1952), American writer
- David Moraga (born 1975), American baseball player
- Eva Laura Moraga (born 1946), Mexican artist
- Gabriel Moraga (1765–1823), Spanish explorer
- John Moraga (born 1984), American mixed martial artist
- José Joaquín Moraga (1745–1785), Spanish explorer
- Mario Moraga (born 1939), Chilean politician
- Natasha Moraga, American-born Mexican tile artist
- Sergio Jiménez Moraga (born 1933), Chilean politician

== See also ==
- Moragas, a surname
