= Coat of arms of Pichilemu =

Coat of arms

- Armiger: Pichilemu
- Adopted: 1986
- Crest: A balustrade with a mitre in the center
- Shield: Quarterly: Forest, Windsurf boards
- Use: Flag of Pichilemu

The coat of arms of Pichilemu (Spanish: Escudo de armas de Pichilemu) is the official heraldic symbol representing the city of Pichilemu, the capital of the Chilean province of Cardenal Caro. It consists of a party per cross referencing the importance of tourism in Pichilemu, and the commune's agricultural, huaso origins. The coat of arms is crested with a "symbolical representation of Pichilemu's past and present: a balustrade fused in a mitre", (Note: Original Spanish quote: "Una corona simbólica –que representa el pasado y presente– de baluatres se funden en una mitra que llevó el primer Cardenal de la Iglesia Católica Chilena –nacido en Pichilemu– Monseñor José María Caro Rodríguez.") worn by José María Caro Rodríguez, the first Cardinal of the Chilean Roman Catholic Church, who was born in the village of San Antonio de Petrel, in Pichilemu.

In September 1986, the municipality of Pichilemu and the Council of Communal Development (CODECO) made a public call for tenders to create a coat of arms for the commune, similar to that of the province of Cardenal Caro. A design made by Hernán Martínez Morales from Curicó was eventually adopted by the local government on 19 December 1986, under the administration of Mayor René Maturana Maldonado.

The original date inscribed in the coat of arms, "21-XII 1891" (21 December 1891), prompted criticism from local historians Antonio Saldías and José Arraño Acevedo, who have pointed out it is "incorrect". (Note: Original Spanish quote: "El grabado muestra el Escudo de Armas de la comuna de Pichilemu –oficializado en un acto público, el 19 de diciembre pasado, mediante decreto alcaldicio– y que, según antecedentes fidedignos, contiene una fecha incorrecta.") Saldías has suggested to commemorate the first municipal meeting of 6 May 1894, or the grant of the title of encomienda of Topocalma on 24 January 1544, for example.

== Origin ==
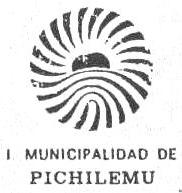
1987 black and white reproduction of the official logo and seal of the local government.

During the earlier years of the municipal administration of Pichilemu by Mayor René Maturana Maldonado (1984–92), the municipality made use of a drawing resembling a sun as the official logo and seal, which was used in official documents.

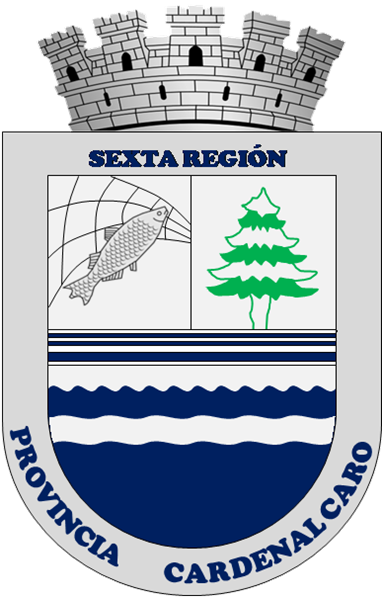
The local government and CODECO were seeking for a coat of arms similar to that of the province of Cardenal Caro.

In September 1986, the local government and the Council of Communal Development (Consejo de Desarrollo Comunal, CODECO) made a public call for tenders to create a coat of arms for the commune, with the purpose of "counting with a symbolic expression of representativeness, and to exalt distinctive features of the area and its people," (Note: Spanish original quote: "...con el objeto de contar con una expresión simbólica de representatividad y exaltar características propias de la zona y su gente.") adding that they were "seeking a coat of arms similar, but not identical to that of the province of Cardenal Caro." (Note: Original Spanish quote: "Un escudo de armas similar, pero no igual al de la provincia Cardenal Caro –en la foto– busca la I. Municipalidad de Pichilemu y el Consejo de Desarrollo Comunal, CODECO, para la comuna.") Participants could send as many designs as they wanted, as far as it included the name of the commune and the date of its creation, 21 December 1891. Authors could add a motto and an inscription to their coat of arms if they wanted to. An article in local newspaper Pichilemu stated that the new coat of arms was to be chosen by a jury composed of the mayor of Pichilemu, the director of Municipal Works, two members of the CODECO, a representative of the culture department of the regional secretariat of the Education Ministry, an artist, and a teacher. The eventual winner would earn a prize of 100,000 pesos, and a diploma. Once past the deadline, set for 31 October 1986, the jury had a month to make a decision.

The winning design for coat of arms of Pichilemu was announced in December 1986. It was created by Hernán Martínez Morales from Curicó, Region of the Maule, who was described in the Pichilemu edition of that month as a "fan (of Pichilemu), and regular vacationer" in the city. He told the newspaper he took knowledge of the public call made by the local government by reading a previous edition of Pichilemu; Martínez requested the municipality for more details on his Fiestas Patrias holiday, and sent a design "with a lot of faith." Martínez Morales was, at the time, a student of graphic design at the University of Valparaíso. His design was adopted by decree of mayor René Maturana Maldonado on 19 December 1986 as the official coat of arms of the commune of Pichilemu in a public ceremony.

== Description ==
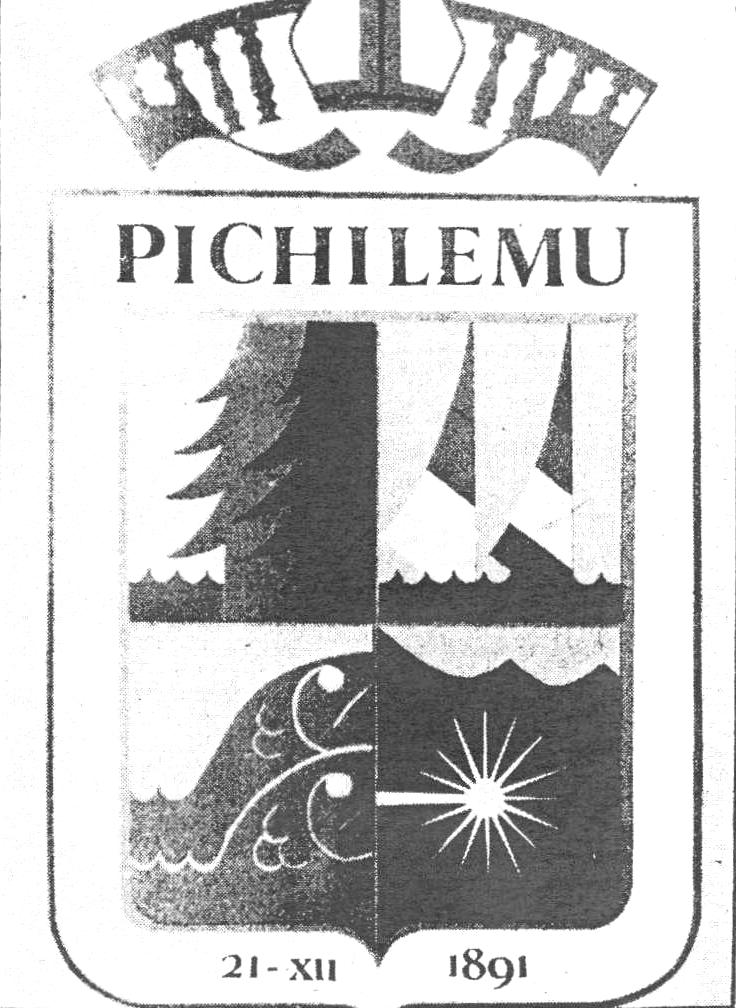
Original design of the coat of arms of Pichilemu as published in the December 1986 edition of Pichilemu

The shield is divided party per cross: that is, it is divided in four equal parts. The first quarter is or, and the remaining are bleu celeste. According to descriptions by the designer of the coat of arms, Hernán Martínez Morales, in the December 1986 edition of Pichilemu, the forest and sea quarter, which has a yellow background, portrays "the richness of the area, its potential;" the windsurf boards quarter, which like the two remaining quarters has a sky blue background, depicts the tourism in Pichilemu, water sports, and "the exceptional conditions for their practice;" the sea quarter represents "the men who work at the sea, in a symbolic manner;" the fourth quarter represents the local agriculture, "with the country and a spur."

The name of the commune, Pichilemu is written in the upper side of the coat of arms, while the date of creation of the commune is located in the lower side ("22-XII 1891", originally had incorrectly inscribed "21-XII 1891"). The crest, according to its designer, "symbolically represents the past and future" of Pichilemu, with "a balustrade that fuses with a mitre", worn by the first Chilean Cardinal of the Catholic Church José María Caro Rodríguez, who was born in the Pichilemu village of San Antonio de Petrel, to Rita Rodríguez Cornejo and José María Caro Martínez, the first mayor of Pichilemu.

Martínez described the colors used in his creation, beginning with the yellow, which "represents the sun, the light and the warmth of a welcoming place. Sun which stays in Pichilemu to make us spend beautiful moments." The green color and its tones represent the "forest, economic potential of the area, which augurs the countryman a promising future." He described the blue color and its tones used in the coat of arms as "speaking of the sea off the coast of Pichilemu, sea that is present in every moment of our stay in Pichilemu. Sea that is richness and that 'promises us a future splendor'." (Note: Martínez uses the expression "promises us a future splendor" ("nos promete un futuro esplendor") as a play on words with the Chilean National Anthem ("y ese mar que tranquilo te baña, te promete futuro esplendor").) Martínez used the red color to represent "the tourism along all colors, happiness, vacations, sport," while described the use of greenish gray as the "touch of distinction, elegance, nobleness."

=== Possibly inappropriate date ===
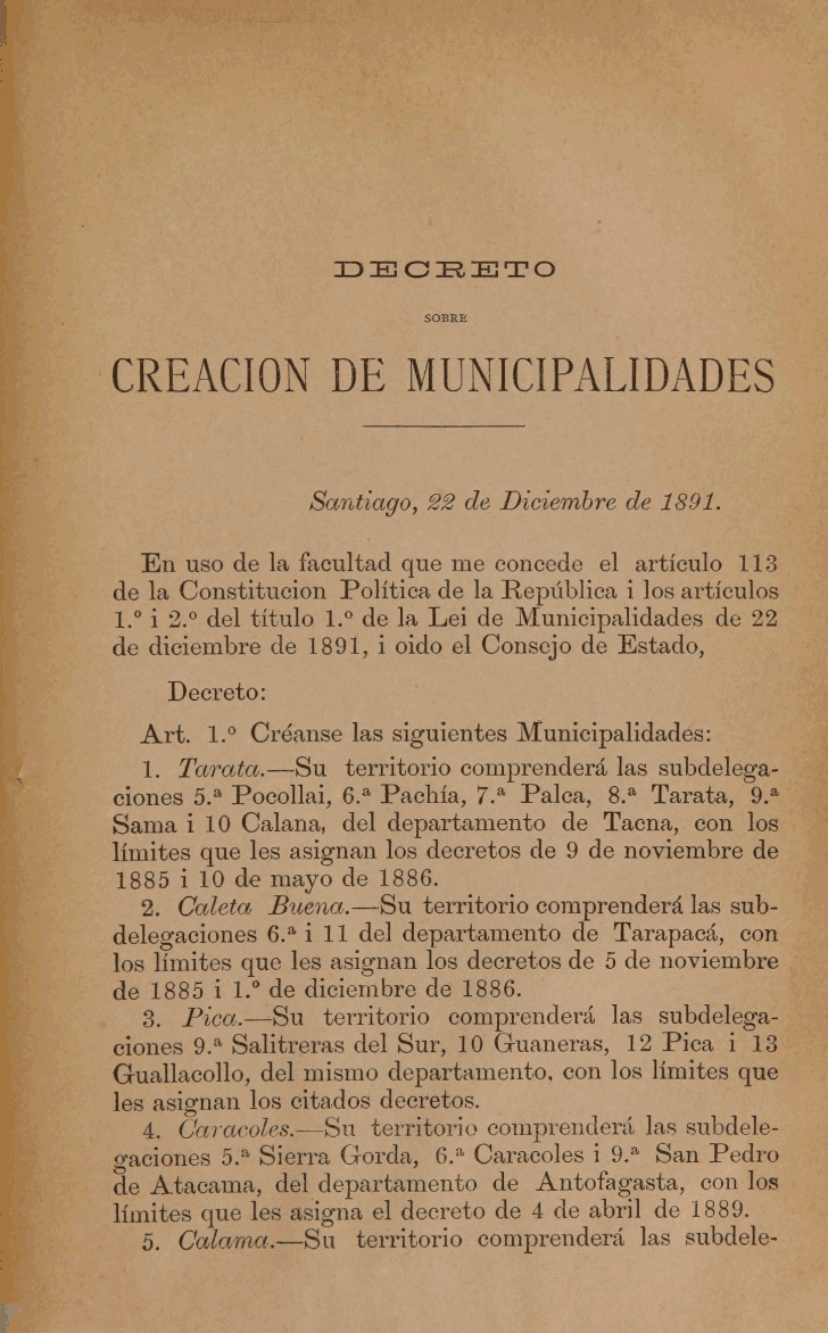
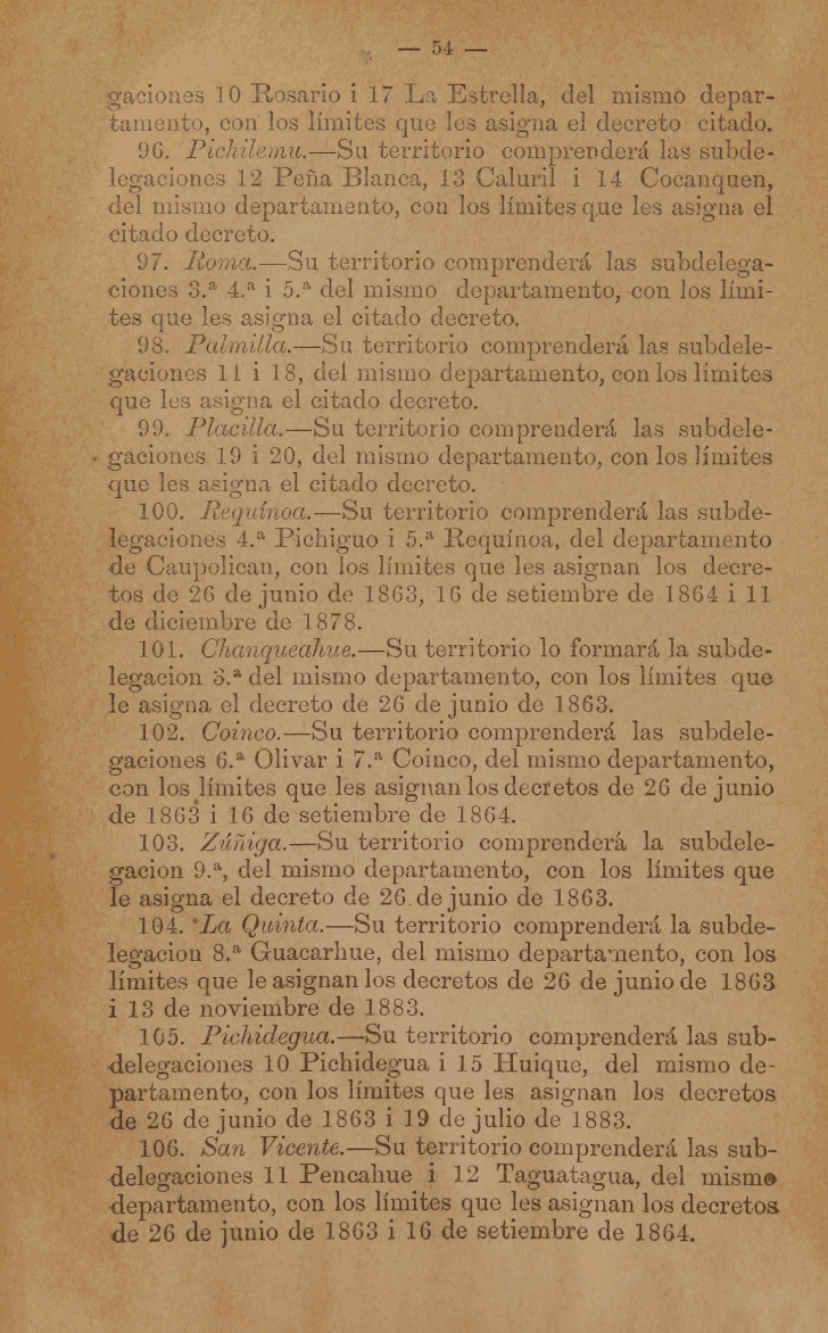
Saldías cites this 22 December 1891 law as a "reliable proof" that the coat of arms' inscribed date is "incorrect". In the second image, the stipulation of the creation of the commune of Pichilemu. (Note: Quote: "96. Pichilemu.—Su territorio comprenderá las subdelegaciones 12 Peña Blanca, 13 Caluril (sic, Cáhuil) i 14 Cocanquen (sic, Cocauquén), del mismo departamento (de San Fernando), con los límites que les asigna el citado decreto (11 de agosto de 1867)." (Translation: "96. Pichilemu.—Its territory will comprise the Peñablanca (12th), Cáhuil (13th), and Cocauquén (14th) subdelegations, of the same department of San Fernando, with the limits assigned by the cited decree of 11 August 1867."))

Concerns were raised by Antonio Saldías (pen name Don Antonio de Petrel) regarding the appropriateness of the date used to celebrate the anniversary of Pichilemu, which commemorated the creation of the commune, on 21 December 1891, a date also used in the coat of arms. (Note: The commune was created officially by the Lei de organizacion i atribuciones de las municipalidades (Law of Organization and Attributions of the Municipalities), promulgated on 22 December 1891, and not on 21 December 1891, as it was incorrectly celebrated.) Saldías pointed out that, since there was no act of foundation of Pichilemu nor record of date of the first inhabitation of the area by the Promaucaes, the date of 24 January 1544, specified in the title of encomienda of Topocalma given by Spanish conquistador Pedro de Valdivia to Juan Gómez de Almagro, another conquistador, was the most correct date to be used to commemorate the anniversary of Pichilemu. The current territory of Pichilemu was part of the encomienda of Topocalma.

Later, in a March 1987 article for Pichilemu, Saldías condemned the use of an "incorrect" date in the coat of arms, stating that all Chilean communes were created on 22 December 1891 and not on 21 December, as it appeared in the coat of arms. The historian wrote that "Pichilemu possesses its own events, many of them with more valid and rightful dates [...]. But overall, very ours," (Note: Original Spanish quote: "Pichilemu posee acontecimientos propios, muchos con fechas más válidas y legítimas en sus efemérides históricas. Por sobre todo muy nuestros.") and went on to suggest some "more appropriate dates" for the coat of arms and the anniversary of Pichilemu, including: the grant of the Topocalma encomienda title, the date of the purchase of the current territory of central Pichilemu by Daniel Ortúzar Cuevas (1884), the date of purchase of the "rustic farm" of San Antonio de Petrel by Agustín Ross Edwards (5 September 1885), (Note: Specific date not stated in Pichilemu article. Extracted from Antonio Saldías' book Pichilemu: mis fuentes de información.) the merced de tierra (Note: A merced de tierra is defined as the "grant of territory, given by Spanish conquistadores, to promote inhabiting of soil in the Americas.") of Cáhuil given to Leonor de la Corte (1609), the merced de tierra of San Antonio de Petrel given to Francisco Rojas y Puebla (1611), the date of the first municipal meeting of Pichilemu (6 May 1894).

In September 1987, local journalist and historian José Arraño Acevedo said after declining the Distinción 11 de Septiembre (11 September Award) award given by the Municipality of Pichilemu that his nomination was an "inconsequence", "when I have gone to the municipality to tell them that they have committed an error by using a wrong date in the official coat of arms of the commune, and although I have spoken with reasonings, they have not heard me." (Note: Original Spanish quote: "Encuentro como una inconsecuencia que "me premien", cuando yo he ido allá (a la municipalidad) a exponerles que han cometido un error colocando una fecha errada en el Escudo Oficial de la comuna y pese a que lo he señalado con fundamentos, no me han escuchado.")
