= Flag of Pichilemu =

Pichilemu
- Use: State flag and ensign
- Proportion: 2:3
- Adopted: 2000

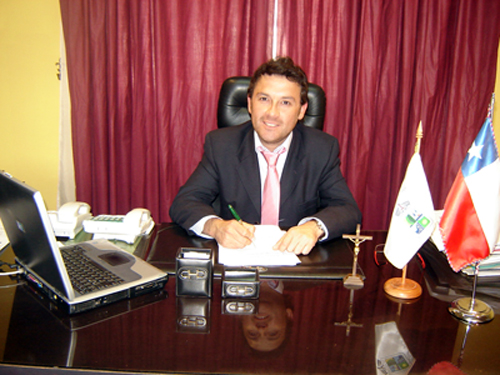
Marcelo Cabrera, mayor of Pichilemu, in his office. The flag of Pichilemu can be seen on his table.

The flag of Pichilemu consists of a white background with the coat of arms of Pichilemu in the centre. The flag's ratio is 2:3.

== See also ==
- Coat of arms of Pichilemu
