= José Serafín López =

17th mayor of Pichilemu, Chile

17th Mayor of Pichilemu
- In office 25 May 1935 – 4 October 1935
- Preceded by: Alberto Morales Moraga
- Succeeded by: Alberto Morales Moraga (interim); Humberto Llanos Martínez

Personal details
- Died: 4 October 1935
- Occupation: Civil servant

José Serafín López Lizana (died 4 October 1935) was the 17th mayor of the commune of Pichilemu, an office which he held from May 1935 until his death in October of that year. He was succeeded by Humberto Llanos Martínez.

== Political career ==
López Lizana was elected mayor of Pichilemu on 7 April 1935. His council was composed of the newly elected regidores Alberto Morales Moraga, Ramón Klehmet Genoux, Felipe Iturriaga Esquivel and Humberto Llanos Martínez. López Lizana took office on 25 May 1935. However, he died in office on 4 October of that year. Armando Caroca Rojas took over the council vacant and in December, the council chose Humberto Llanos Martínez as López's successor. He had been temporarily succeeded by interim mayor Alberto Morales Moraga.

Political offices
Preceded by Alberto Morales Moraga	Mayor of Pichilemu; 1935	Succeeded by Alberto Morales Moraga (interim); Humberto Llanos Martínez
