= María Urrutia =

María Urrutia may refer to:

- María Isabel Urrutia (born 1965), weightlifter, athlete and politician from Colombia
- María José Urrutia (born 1993), Chilean footballer
- Mario Urrutia Carrasco, Chilean politician
