= Olga Maturana =

Chilean politician (1906–1973)

Olga Maturana Espinosa
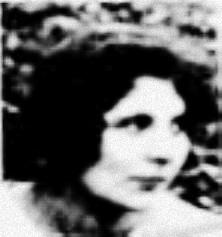

Mayor of Pichilemu
- In office May 28, 1951 – May 17, 1953
- Preceded by: Sergio Morales Retamal
- Succeeded by: Sergio Morales Retamal

Personal details
- Born: October 10, 1906 Santiago, Chile
- Died: July 16, 1973 (aged 66) Pichilemu, Chile
- Spouse: Felipe Iturriaga Esquivel
- Children: 5

Olga Maturana Espinosa (October 10, 1906 – July 16, 1973) was a Chilean politician born in Santiago. Maturana worked as Councillor of Pichilemu in 1950, and became the first female Mayor of Pichilemu in 1951.

== Biography ==
Maturana was born on October 10, 1906, in Santiago, Chile. Her parents were Arturo Maturana Zúñiga and Emma Espinosa Pedrada.

Maturana married in 1926 Felipe Iturriaga Esquivel in Santiago when he was 20. Maturana and Iturriaga moved to Pichilemu in 1932. Iturriaga was elected Mayor for three terms (1932–1935; 1941–1944; and 1956–1959), and Maturana was elected Councillor of Pichilemu in 1950, along with Carlos Echazarreta Larraín, Ricardo Ayala and Armando Caroca Rojas. Sergio Morales Retamal was elected mayor, but he left the office in 1951.

Olga Maturana succeeded Sergio Morales on May 28, 1951, and became the first female mayor of Pichilemu, as an independent. Her term ended on May 17, 1953.

Maturana had five children with her husband Felipe Iturriaga.

Maturana died on July 16, 1973, in Pichilemu, Chile at 66.

== Influence ==
As of 2008, only two women had occupied political offices in Pichilemu: Alicia López Galarce (Councillor from 1953 until 1956) and Olga Maturana.

In 2008, 12 women enrolled to the municipal election. Only three of them were eventually elected as councillors: Marta Urzúa, Andrea Aranda and Viviana Parraguez.

Political offices
Preceded by Sergio Morales Retamal	Mayor of Pichilemu; 1951–1953	Succeeded by Sergio Morales Retamal
