= Humberto Llanos =

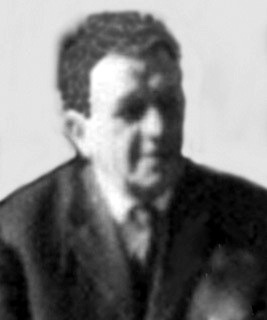

18th Mayor of Pichilemu
- In office 11 December 1935 – 18 May 1941
- Preceded by: Serafín López Lizana; Alberto Morales Moraga (interim)
- Succeeded by: Felipe Iturriaga Esquivel

Personal details
- Occupation: Civil servant

Humberto Llanos Martínez was the 18th Mayor of the commune of Pichilemu, office which he held for two three-year terms, between December 1935 and May 1941. He took office following the death of the previous mayor, Serafín López Lizana, and was succeeded by Felipe Iturriaga Esquivel.

== Political career ==
Humberto Llanos was elected regidor of Pichilemu on 7 April 1935 for a term that would last until 1938. The mayor-elect was Serafín López Lizana, and his council was composed of the regidores Alberto Morales Moraga, Ramón Klehmet Genoux, Felipe Iturriaga Esquivel and himself. Llanos took office on 25 May 1935. However, López Lizana died in office just four months later, in September, and Llanos Martínez was elected mayor by the council in December of that year. Armando Caroca Rojas took over Llanos' vacant in the council. Llanos was re-elected mayor, this time popularly, for the 1938–41 term; his council for that term was composed by Lorenzo Arraño Ortíz, Carlos Silva Prado, Vicente Richard, and Alberto Morales Moraga. He was succeeded in 1941 by Felipe Iturriaga Esquivel. Llanos was elected regidor for Iturriaga's term (1941–44), and later for the 1947–50 term under mayor Carlos Echazarreta Larraín.

Llanos was a member of the Conservative Party of Chile.

== Other work ==
Llanos was also a member of the Pichilemu Fire Bureau, and was appointed Super-Intendant of the bureau for the year of 1952.

Political offices
Preceded by Serafín López Lizana; Alberto Morales Moraga (interim)	Mayor of Pichilemu; 1935–1941	Succeeded by Felipe Iturriaga Esquivel
