= Moragas =

Moragas is a surname. Notable people with the surname include:

- Carmen Ruiz Moragas (1898–1936), Spanish actress
- Elvira Moragas Cantarero (1881–1936), Spanish nun
- Estanislao Figueras y Moragas (1819–1882), Spanish politician
- Jorge Moragas (born 1965), Spanish diplomat
- Tomàs Moragas (1837–1906), Spanish painter

== See also ==
- Moraga (disambiguation)
