= José Ramón Araneda =

Chilean politician

José Araneda

11th Mayor of Pichilemu
- In office 10 July 1928 – 12 July 1930
- President: Carlos Ibáñez del Campo
- Preceded by: José Camilo Silva
- Succeeded by: Pastor Castro Rojas

Personal details
- Born: 14 September 1887 Lebu, Arauco, Chile
- Occupation: Public worker

José Ramón Araneda y Araneda (born 14 September 1887) was a Chilean politician and the 11th Mayor of the commune of Pichilemu, an office which he held between July 1928 and July 1930.

== Political career ==
He was appointed mayor of the junta de vecinos (neighbors' council) of Pichilemu by decree of President Carlos Ibáñez del Campo following José Camilo Silva's departure, on 10 July 1928. His term lasted until 12 July 1930.

Political offices
Preceded by José Camilo Silva	Mayor of Pichilemu; 1928–1930	Succeeded by Pastor Castro Rojas
