= Fernando Maturana =

13th Mayor of Pichilemu
- In office 27 November 1930 – 16 October 1932
- President: Carlos Ibáñez del Campo; Juan Esteban Montero Rodríguez
- Preceded by: Pastor Castro Rojas
- Succeeded by: Felipe Iturriaga Esquivel

Personal details
- Occupation: Public worker

Fernando Maturana Barahona was the 13th Mayor of the commune of Pichilemu, office which he held between November 1930 and October 1932, under Presidents Carlos Ibáñez del Campo and Juan Esteban Montero Rodríguez.

== Political career ==
Maturana was appointed mayor of Pichilemu by decree of President Carlos Ibáñez del Campo on 27 November 1930. Along with him, Pedro Pulgar Gómez and Basiliano Leyton Pavez were appointed as vocales. Maturana's term lasted until 16 October 1932.

Political offices
Preceded by Pastor Castro Rojas	Mayor of Pichilemu; 1930–1932	Succeeded by Felipe Iturriaga Esquivel
