= Julio Waidele =

Julio Waidele Wolff

34th Mayor of Pichilemu
- In office 20 April 1981 – 16 March 1982
- President: Augusto Pinochet Ugarte (Government Junta)
- Preceded by: José Lino Vargas Jorquera
- Succeeded by: Emilio Merino Lacoste

Julio Waidele Wolff was the 34th mayor of the commune of Pichilemu, office which he held between 1981 and 1982, after being appointed by the military government presided by General Augusto Pinochet.

== Biography ==
=== Political career ===
Waidele Wolff was appointed Mayor of Pichilemu, by the military government presided by General Augusto Pinochet, in 1981. He succeeded José Lino Vargas Jorquera, who held the office between 1979 and 1981. He held office until 1982.

During his administration, he made an attempt to buy the building that now hosts the Agustín Ross Cultural Center with municipal funds; however, Waidele was not allowed to complete the purchase because the price of eight million pesos (approximately US$16,000) was "too high for the municipal budget, and would leave many things without financing."

Political offices
Preceded by José Lino Vargas Jorquera	Mayor of Pichilemu; 1981–1982	Succeeded by Emilio Merino Lacoste
