= Emilio Merino =

Chilean politician (born 1950)

35th Mayor of Pichilemu
- In office 16 March 1982 – 30 August 1984
- President: Augusto Pinochet Ugarte (Government Junta)
- Preceded by: Julio Waidele Wolff
- Succeeded by: René Maturana Maldonado

Personal details
- Born: 3 February 1950 (age 76) Cauquenes, Chile

Emilio Merino Lacoste (born 3 February 1950) was the 35th Mayor of the commune of Pichilemu, an office which he held between 16 March 1982 and 30 August 1984, after being appointed by the military government of General Augusto Pinochet. He also was the Mayor of Paredones between 1980 and 1981.

== Biography ==
=== Political career ===
Emilio Merino Lacoste was appointed Mayor of Pichilemu by the military government of General Augusto Pinochet in 1982. He succeeded Julio Waidele Wolff, and held the office until 30 August 1984, when the military government appointed René Maturana Maldonado.

Political offices
Preceded by Julio Waidele Wolff	Mayor of Pichilemu; 1982–1984	Succeeded by René Maturana Maldonado
