= Osvaldo Sotomayor =

15th Mayor of Pichilemu
- In office 25 February 1935 – 6 March 1935
- President: Arturo Alessandri Palma
- Preceded by: Felipe Iturriaga Esquivel
- Succeeded by: Alberto Morales Moraga

Personal details
- Occupation: Civil servant

Osvaldo Sotomayor Ilabaca was the 15th Mayor of the commune of Pichilemu, office which he held between February and March 1935, for a span of only nine days, under President Arturo Alessandri Palma. Sotomayor's mayoral term is the shortest in the history of Pichilemu, excluding acting mayor Gustavo Parraguez Galarce.

== Political career ==
Osvaldo Sotomayor was appointed as vocal of the municipality of Pichilemu through the first mayoral term of Felipe Iturriaga Esquivel, which lasted between October 1932 and February 1935. Sotomayor was appointed mayor of Pichilemu by decree of President Arturo Alessandri Palma on 25 February 1935. Along with him, Guillermo Greene Ortega, his predecessor Felipe Iturriaga Esquivel, and Nepomuceno Urzúa were appointed as vocales. Sotomayor's term lasted for nine days, until 6 March 1935.

Political offices
Preceded by Felipe Iturriaga Esquivel	Mayor of Pichilemu; 1935	Succeeded by Alberto Morales Moraga
