= Felipe Iturriaga =

Chilean politician (1899–1977)

Felipe Iturriaga Esquivel
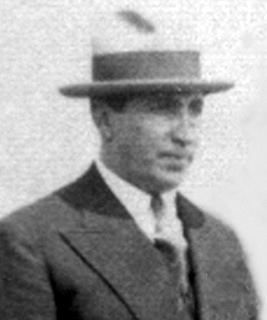

Mayor of Pichilemu (1st term)
- In office October 16, 1932 – February 25, 1935
- Preceded by: Fernando Maturana
- Succeeded by: Osvaldo Sotomayor

Mayor of Pichilemu (2nd term)
- In office May 18, 1941 – May 21, 1944
- Preceded by: Humberto Llanos
- Succeeded by: Armando Caroca

Mayor of Pichilemu (3rd term)
- In office May 20, 1956 – May 15, 1960
- Preceded by: Sergio Morales
- Succeeded by: Basilio Sánchez

Personal details
- Born: December 7, 1899 Colchagua, Chile
- Died: September 2, 1977 (aged 77) Santiago, Chile
- Spouse: Olga Maturana
- Children: 5

Felipe Iturriaga Esquivel (December 7, 1899 – September 2, 1977) was a Chilean politician, Mayor of Pichilemu from 1932 to 1935, 1941–1944 and 1956–1960.

== Biography ==
Iturriaga was born in Colchagua on December 7, 1899. He was baptized in Ciruelos Parish, where he lived for most of his life.

Iturriaga married Olga Maturana (1906–1973), and they had 5 children: Arturo Iturriaga; María Mercedes Iturriaga; Carlos Iturriaga; Olga Iturriaga; and Rodolfo Iturriaga.

Iturriaga died in Santiago, Chile on September 2, 1977.

Iturriaga was a member of the Conservative Party of Chile.

Political offices
Preceded by Fernando Maturana Maturana; Humberto Llanos Martínez; Sergio Morales Retamal	Mayor of Pichilemu; 1932–1935; 1941–1944; 1956–1960	Succeeded by Osvaldo Sotomayor Ilabaca; Armando Caroca Rojas; Basilio Sánchez Beguiristain
