= Alberto Morales =

16th Mayor of Pichilemu
- In office 6 March 1935 – 25 May 1935
- President: Arturo Alessandri Palma
- Preceded by: Osvaldo Sotomayor Ilabaca
- Succeeded by: Serafín López Lizana

Personal details
- Occupation: Civil servant

Alberto Morales Moraga was the 16th Mayor of the commune of Pichilemu, office which he held between March and May 1935, under President Arturo Alessandri Palma. He was succeeded by Serafín López Lizana, who died in office in September 1935.

== Political career ==
Morales Moraga was elected regidor of Pichilemu for the first time for the 1924–25 term. During the government of President Arturo Alessandri Palma, he was appointed mayor of Pichilemu. The date of his appointment and replacement in his office, however, are ambiguous. According to Washington Saldías on Pichilemu News, Morales occupied office for twenty-one days between 4 May, following the resignation of Osvaldo Sotomayor Ilabaca, and the 25 of the same month, upon Serafín López Lizana's appointment. Antonio Saldías, however, states that Morales took office on 6 March and left office on 25 May 1935.

Upon the death of Serafín López Lizana, his successor, in office in September 1935, Morales was appointed interim mayor, and again held the mayoral office until 10 December of the same year. He was elected regidor of Pichilemu some months before, in April, and held the position between December 1935, until 1938. He was re-elected for the 1938–41 term.

== Family ==
Alberto Morales was the father of Sergio Morales Retamal, who would, like him, go on to become Mayor of Pichilemu.

Political offices
Preceded by Osvaldo Sotomayor Ilabaca; Serafín López Lizana	Mayor of Pichilemu; 1935	Succeeded by Serafín López Lizana; Humberto Llanos Martínez
