= Pastor Castro =

Chilean politician

Pastor Castro Rojas

12th Mayor of Pichilemu
- In office 12 July 1930 – 24 November 1930
- President: Carlos Ibáñez del Campo
- Preceded by: José Ramón Araneda
- Succeeded by: Fernando Maturana Maturana

Personal details
- Occupation: Public worker

Pastor Castro Rojas was the 12th Mayor of the commune of Pichilemu, office which he held between July and November 1930. He left the office because of poor health.

== Political career ==
Castro Rojas, a long-time resident of Rancagua, current capital of the Region of O'Higgins, was appointed mayor of the junta de vecinos (neighbors' council) of Pichilemu by decree of President Carlos Ibáñez del Campo, on 12 July 1930. Throughout his term, there were no vocales in the municipal council. Because of poor health, he resigned the mayorship on 24 November 1930.

Political offices
Preceded by José Ramón Araneda	Mayor of Pichilemu; 1930	Succeeded by Fernando Maturana Maturana
