= Manuel Camilo Silva =

José Manuel Camilo Silva

10th Mayor of Pichilemu
- In office 14 May 1928 – 10 July 1928
- President: Carlos Ibáñez del Campo
- Preceded by: Evaristo Merino Canales
- Succeeded by: José Ramón Araneda y Araneda

Personal details
- Occupation: Public worker

José Manuel Camilo Silva was the tenth Mayor of the commune of Pichilemu, office which he held between May and July 1928.

== Political career ==
He was appointed mayor of the junta de vecinos (neighbors' council) of Pichilemu by decree of President Carlos Ibáñez del Campo following Evaristo Merino's resignation in May 1928. The municipal council was then composed by him and Isaías Reyes and Guillermo Greene Ortega as vocales. His term lasted until 10 July 1928.

Political offices
Preceded by Evaristo Merino Canales	Mayor of Pichilemu; 1928	Succeeded by José Ramón Araneda y Araneda
