= Sergio Morales =

Sergio Morales Retamal
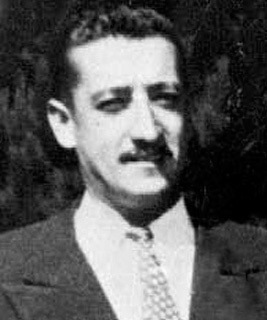

24th Mayor of Pichilemu
- In office 17 May 1953 – 20 May 1956
- Preceded by: Olga Maturana Espinosa
- Succeeded by: Felipe Iturriaga Esquivel

22nd Mayor of Pichilemu
- In office 21 May 1950 – 23 May 1951
- Preceded by: Carlos Echazarreta Larraín
- Succeeded by: Olga Maturana Espinosa

Personal details
- Occupation: Civil servant

Sergio Morales Retamal was the 22nd and 24th Mayor of the commune of Pichilemu, office which he first held between May 1950 and May 1951, and later between May 1953 and May 1956. Morales also held office as regidor of Pichilemu for two terms.

== Political career ==
Morales Retamal was elected mayor of Pichilemu for the 1950–53 term, and took office on 21 May 1950. He divided his term in a "gentleman's agreement" with Olga Maturana Espinosa, who became the first (and until now, the only) woman mayor of Pichilemu following Sergio Morales' resignation in May 1951. He then completed his term as a regidor. He was re-elected for the 1953–56 term, and took office on 17 May 1953. He left office on 20 May 1956. For the 1956–59 and 1959–63 terms, he was elected regidor of Pichilemu.

== Personal life ==
Morales was the son of Alberto Morales Moraga, who also was Mayor of Pichilemu. He held office between March and May 1935, and later that year between September and December, following the death of Serafín López Lizana.

Political offices
Preceded by Carlos Echazarreta Larraín; Olga Maturana Espinosa	Mayor of Pichilemu; 1950–1951; 1953–1956	Succeeded by Olga Maturana Espinosa; Felipe Iturriaga Esquivel
