= Eduardo Parraguez =

Chilean politician (1935–2026)

Eduardo Parraguez Galarce
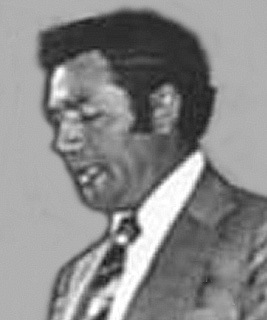

32nd Mayor of Pichilemu
- In office 1975 – 23 May 1979
- President: Augusto Pinochet Ugarte (Government Junta)
- Preceded by: Mario Urrutia Carrasco
- Succeeded by: José Lino Vargas Jorquera

Personal details
- Born: 21 October 1935 Paredones, Chile
- Died: 9 August 2026 (aged 90)
- Spouse: María Mirta Lidia Cáceres González

Víctor Eduardo Parraguez Galarce (21 October 1935 – 9 August 2026) was a Chilean politician who served as the 32nd Mayor of the commune of Pichilemu, office which he held between 1975 and 1979, after being appointed by the government junta presided by General Augusto Pinochet. Parraguez Galarce was also an agricultural entrepreneur, and had a role in the committee that prompted the creation of the province of Cardenal Caro, in his home region.

== Life and career ==
=== Background ===
Eduardo Parraguez was born on 21 October 1935 in the commune of Paredones, in current Cardenal Caro Province, Region of O'Higgins, Chile. His parents were Víctor Luis Parraguez and Enedina del Carmen Galarce de Parraguez. Parraguez Galarce married María Mirta Lidia Cáceres González (born 28 July 1945) in La Estrella, on 24 December 1966.

Parraguez died on 9 August 2026, at the age of 90.

=== Political career ===
Parraguez was appointed Mayor of Pichilemu, by decree of the government junta presided by General Augusto Pinochet, in 1975. He succeeded Mario Urrutia Carrasco. Parraguez remained in the office until 1979.

=== Creation of Cardenal Caro Province ===
Parraguez, along with Osvaldo Vidal Vidal – president of the organization, Flavio Álvarez Jorquera – former regidor of Pichilemu, Rafael Álvarez Maturana, Enrique Romero Lorca, and Antonio Molfino Chiorrini, were members of the Comité Pro-Provincia (Pro-Province Committee), a private organization that worked in 1979 for the creation of the province of Cardenal Caro. By the time of the province's creation, on 3 October 1979, Parraguez Galarce had quit the mayor office, but his successor, José Lino Vargas, took over his role. In a November 2009 interview with El Expreso de la Costa, Parraguez recalled "fighting against Marchigüe and Santa Cruz mayors" for Pichilemu to become the capital of the yet to-be-created province; "battle" which the committee Pro-Provincia won. All of the committee's members were awarded by Governor Julio Ibarra Maldonado in 2013, thirty-four years after the creation of the province.

=== Other work ===
Parraguez was a founding member of the Club Aéreo de Pichilemu (Aerial Club of Pichilemu), whose founding took place on 2 November 1964.

Political offices
Preceded by Mario Urrutia Carrasco	Mayor of Pichilemu; 1975–1979	Succeeded by José Lino Vargas Jorquera
