= René Maturana =

Chilean journalist and 36th Mayor of Pichilemu

René Maturana Maldonado

36th Mayor of Pichilemu
- In office 31 August 1984 – April 1992
- Leader: Augusto Pinochet Ugarte (Government Junta)
- Preceded by: Emilio Merino Lacoste
- Succeeded by: Gustavo Parraguez Galarce (acting); Orlando Cornejo Bustamante

Personal details
- Born: René Gabriel Maturana Maldonado; 10 February 1955
- Died: 12 August 2009 (aged 54) Rancagua, Chile
- Spouse: María Angélica Rivera
- Children: Pamela Maturana Rivera; María Gabriela Maturana Rivera
- Profession: Journalist

René Gabriel Maturana Maldonado (10 February 1955 – 12 August 2009) was a Chilean journalist and the 36th Mayor of Pichilemu, holding the position from his appointment by dictator Augusto Pinochet Ugarte on 31 August 1984 until his resignation in April 1992.

Maturana also was an academic at Andrés Bello National University, and was the President of the Rancagua chapter of the College of Journalists of Chile (Spanish: Colegio de Periodistas de Chile).

== Biography ==
René Gabriel Maturana Maldonado was born on 10 February 1955.

=== Mayor of Pichilemu ===
Maturana worked in the O'Higgins regional offices of the Government General Secretariat Ministry until he was appointed Mayor of Pichilemu by the government —set by a coup d'état in 1973— of President Augusto Pinochet Ugarte on 31 August 1984, to replace Emilio Merino Lacoste. Maturana Maldonado was the last mayor to be appointed by the Pinochet military regime, which remained in power until 1990. Former councilor of Pichilemu Washington Saldías noted in an article published on Pichilemu News following Maturana's death, that his mayorship was "marked by significant advances in almost all areas, and whose value was that they were all performed with municipal resources." Saldías also noted that Maturana's work, "although [made] with low municipal budgets, will be remembered as one of the best mayorships [in Pichilemu]."

Through his first year as mayor of Pichilemu, his government spent 17 million pesos making improvements to the Costanera Cardenal José María Caro Avenue (Avenida Costanera Cardenal José María Caro), the municipal stadium —including the construction of an athletic track, Olympic grid—, announced plans to supply electricity to the Santa Teresita, Ramón Freire and Jorge Errázuriz streets and nearby neighborhoods, supplied with telephone, television, and mail services to the villages of Cáhuil and Ciruelos, made minor repairs to the municipal forest, and repaired the municipal gymnasium. Also during his first year as mayor, the local hospital (Hospital de Pichilemu) was inaugurated in a ceremony attended by President Augusto Pinochet, and in later years, Maturana created the municipal boarding school, paved the Costanera Avenue —which borders the coast of Pichilemu—, created the Arturo Prat Square near Playa Principal, financed the re-modelling of the Agustín Ross Park, which was re-inaugurated with celebrations on 13 December 1987, and created the newspaper El Pichilemino, directed by Félix Calderón; the newspaper circulated between 1985 and 1986. Maturana founded public schools in Pueblo de Viudas, Infiernillo, Alto Ramírez, and El Potrero —in current Paredones—, which were inaugurated simultaneously in 1988. In 1989, he created the Public Library of Pichilemu, which is now hosted at the Agustín Ross Cultural Center. Additionally, the former casino created by Agustín Ross Edwards and its adjacent park were declared National Monuments of Chile. He also created several music festivals for Pichilemu, bringing artists like Miriam Hernández, and Luis Jara to local scenarios.

He was confirmed in the office by the Region of O'Higgins Development Council on 16 October 1989, which decided that Maturana would remain Mayor of Pichilemu for "good service" reasons. Maturana Maldonado resigned as mayor of Pichilemu in April 1992, and Gustavo Parraguez Galarce, municipal secretary, was named acting mayor of Pichilemu; he held office until the first municipal election since the return to democracy saw Orlando Cornejo Bustamante elected mayor of the commune. His mayorship has been qualified as "the golden years of the commune of Pichilemu."

=== Later life ===
After he resigned as Mayor of Pichilemu, he worked as journalist for the Rancagua-based newspaper El Rancagüino, and as a professor at Andrés Bello National University and its institute, AIEP. He also worked as Public Relations official for FUSAT (Fundación de Salud El Teniente, El Teniente Health Foundation), and was also President of the O'Higgins regional chapter of the College of Journalists of Chile (Colegio de Periodistas de Chile) for almost a decade.

=== Illness and death ===
In 2008, his health condition suddenly worsened, and was affected by a peritonitis and a "severe metastasis" caused by the removal of one kidney one year before. He was admitted at the Intensive Care Unit at Clínica FUSAT in Rancagua in May 2008, and underwent surgery on the 14th of that month. His condition was described by his doctor as being in "serious condition and in danger of death because of septicemia complications." His condition improved by July 2008.

However, he fell ill again by July 2009; local newspaper El Expreso de la Costa said at the time: "the life of a great former mayor of Pichilemu is getting shut down." He was diagnosed with lung cancer, and died on 12 August 2009 at 09:00 local time in Rancagua, Chile. A mass was conducted by Father Bernabé Silva —cura párroco (priest of the parish of Pichilemu) through Maturana's term— at the Iglesia del Divino Maestro in Rancagua, which was attended by relatives, people from Pichilemu, politicians from Rancagua including mayor Eduardo Soto, amid others. was buried at the Parque Jardín de las Flores, in the commune of Machalí, on the following day.

== Personal life ==
René Maturana and family, circa 1988.

René Maturana was married to María Angélica Rivera, with whom he had two daughters: Pamela, a kinesiologist, and María Gabriela, an odontologist.

Political offices
Preceded by Emilio Merino Lacoste	Mayor of Pichilemu; 1984–1992	Succeeded by Gustavo Parraguez Galarce (interim); Orlando Cornejo Bustamante
