= Government of Pichilemu =

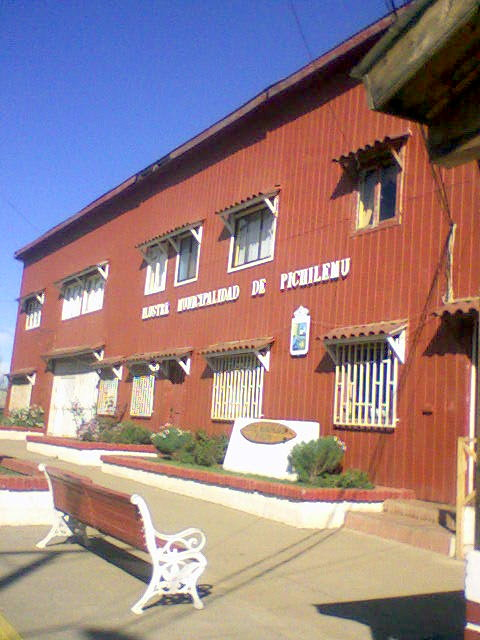
Pichilemu town hall.

The Government of Pichilemu comprises the Mayor of Pichilemu and Pichilemu City Council. They are housed within Pichilemu town hall.

== Mayor of Pichilemu ==
The Mayor of Pichilemu is elected every 4 years. The current mayor is Roberto Córdova.

== Pichilemu City Council ==
The Pichilemu City Council is a seven-member city council.
