= Colchagua, Ñuble =

Coordinates: 36.863°S 72.545°W

Colchagua
- Village
- Colchagua
- Interactive map of Colchagua
- Country: Chile
- Region: Ñuble
- Province: Diguillín Province
- Commune: Quillón

Colchagua is a Chilean village located in Quillón, Diguillín Province, Ñuble Region. It is located close to the villages of Cerro Negro and Chancal.
