= Colchagua, San Rosendo, Bío Bío =

Village in San Rosendo, Chile

Colchagua
- Village
- Colchagua
- Country: Chile
- Region: Bío Bío
- Province: Bío Bío
- Commune: San Rosendo

Colchagua is a Chilean village located in San Rosendo, Bío Bío Province, Bío Bío Region. It is located close to the historic town of Rere and the Estación Buenuraqui railway station.
