= Mario Urrutia Carrasco =

Chilean politician

31st Mayor of Pichilemu
- In office 7 December 1973 – 1975
- President: Augusto Pinochet Ugarte (Government Junta)
- Preceded by: Carlos Echazarreta Iñiguez
- Succeeded by: Eduardo Parraguez Galarce

Mario Urrutia Carrasco was the 31st Mayor of the commune of Pichilemu, office which he held between December 1973 and 1975, after being appointed by the government junta presided by General Augusto Pinochet. Urrutia was also a founding member of the Club Aéreo de Pichilemu (Aerial Club of Pichilemu).

== Biography ==
=== Political career ===
Mario Urrutia Carrasco was appointed Mayor of Pichilemu, by decree of the government junta presided by General Augusto Pinochet, on 7 December 1973. He took office on 7 December of that year, and held the office until 1975.

=== Other work ===
Urrutia is a founding member of the Club Aéreo de Pichilemu (Aerial Club of Pichilemu), whose founding took place on 2 November 1964.

Political offices
Preceded by Carlos Echazarreta Iñiguez	Mayor of Pichilemu; 1973–1975	Succeeded by Eduardo Parraguez Galarce
