= Carlos Echazarreta Larraín =

Civil servant, farmer

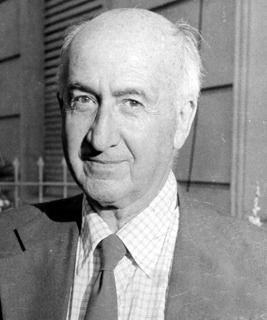

21st Mayor of Pichilemu
- In office 18 May 1947 – 21 May 1950
- Preceded by: Armando Caroca Rojas
- Succeeded by: Sergio Morales Retamal

Personal details
- Occupation: Civil servant, farmer

Carlos Echazarreta Larraín was the 21st Mayor of the commune of Pichilemu, Chile between May 1947 and May 1950. He was succeeded by Sergio Morales Retamal. Echazarreta also was a regidor of Pichilemu for several terms.

== Political career ==
Carlos Echazarreta was elected mayor of Pichilemu for the 1947–50 term, and took office on 18 May 1947. He left the office on 21 May 1950. For the immediate next term of 1950–53, he was elected regidor, and was re-elected for the 1953–56, and 1956–60 terms.

== Personal life ==
According to Guillermo de la Cuadra Gormaz's 1982 book Familias chilenas (Chilean families), Carlos Echazarreta Larraín was born to José Ramón Echazarreta Aristía—owner of the San Javier farm in Malloco—and Josefina Larraín Larraín. De la Cuadra also states that he was a farmer in Colchagua (presumably the Pichilemu area) and, in later years, in Melipilla. Echazarreta married María Iñiguez Infante on 26 July 1930 at Iglesia San Vicente. The Echazarreta Iñiguez couple had three children: Lucrecia, Carlos, and José Horacio.

His son Carlos would, like him, go on to become Mayor of Pichilemu, between 1963 and 1967, and between September and November 1973, after being appointed by the military government of Augusto Pinochet.

Political offices
Preceded by Armando Caroca Rojas	Mayor of Pichilemu; 1947–1950	Succeeded by Sergio Morales Retamal
