= Colchagua, O'Higgins =

Village in Colchagua Province, Chile

Coordinates: 34.547°S 71.399°W

Colchagua
- Village
- Colchagua
- Interactive map of Colchagua
- Country: Chile
- Region: (O'Higgins Region) Libertador General Bernardo O'Higgins
- Province: (Colchagua Province) Colchagua
- Commune: Palmilla

Colchagua is a Chilean village located northwest of Palmilla, Colchagua Province, O'Higgins Region.
