= Mario Moraga =

Mario Moraga Cáceres
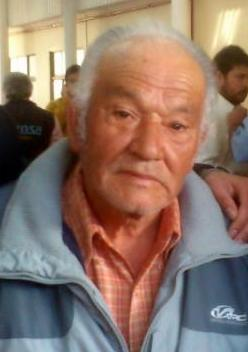

Regidor of Pichilemu
- In office 21 May 1967 – 16 May 1971

Personal details
- Born: 16 July 1939 Pichilemu, Chile
- Died: 8 November 2025 (aged 86) Pichilemu, Chile
- Party: Christian Democrat Party of Chile (until 1992)

Mario Alejandro Moraga Cáceres (b. Pichilemu, 16 July 1939 — 8 November 2025) was a Chilean politician, who worked as regidor of Pichilemu, O'Higgins Region, between 1967 and 1970. Moraga is popularly known as el Sin Pelos en la Lengua (literally, in English: The One Without Hairs in the Tongue, meaning The Outspoken One, or The One Without Minced Words), after the radio program he hosts in Radio Entre Olas.

== Biography ==
Mario Moraga Cáceres was born in Pichilemu on 16 July 1939. His parents were Adolfo Moraga Rodríguez and María Magdalena Cáceres Jorquera.

Moraga died on 8 November 2025.

=== Political career ===
Moraga was elected in 1967 regidor of Pichilemu, an office which he held until 1971 under Mayor Carlos Rojas Pavez. After the Chilean transition to democracy, Moraga has participated in several municipal elections. In 1992, he renounced the Christian Democrat Party of Chile, after he was not supported by his party to run in the municipal elections of that year; he ran as independent in 1996, but was not elected mayor nor councillor, obtaining only 229 (3.61%) from the 6,352 total votes. In the 2000, and 2004 municipal elections, he ran for mayor, unsuccessfully. In 2008, Moraga ran independently for councillor of Pichilemu, obtaining 629 (8.83%) from the 7,127 total votes (surpassing Marta Urzúa Púa — who was elected — for almost 500 votes), but was not elected. In 2012, he ran again for mayor, but lost against Roberto Córdova; Moraga obtained 469 votes, the 6.57 per cent from the total vote.

=== Sin Pelos en la Lengua ===
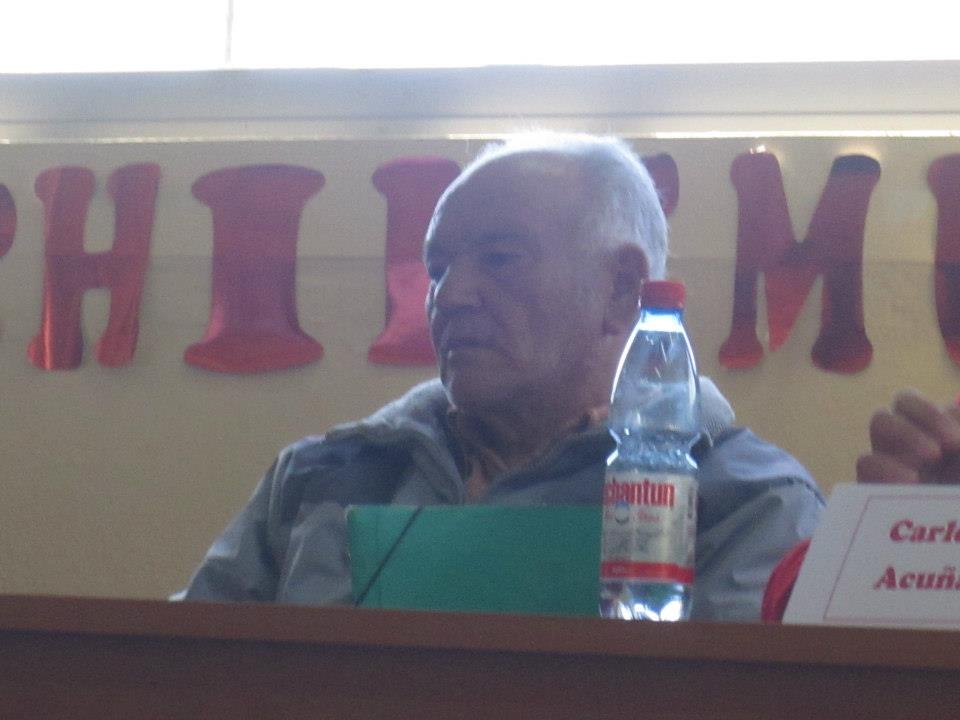
Mario Moraga during the Municipal Debate held in October 2012 at Colegio de la Preciosa Sangre

Sin Pelos en la Lengua is a radio program, hosted by Mario Moraga since 1997, in which he informs and comments communal, regional, and national events, although he mostly discusses scandals and controversial matters that happen in the municipality of Pichilemu. It was first broadcast on Radio Atardecer, although it moved to Radio Entre Olas in 1999. According to Pichilemu News, Mario Moraga's Sin Pelos en la Lengua is one of the most heard radio programs in Pichilemu.

Sin Pelos en la Lengua is funded "by Pichileminian businessmen, some merchants, and citizens."

In May 2010, Moraga was sued for libel and slander by Dante Cornejo, municipal administrator during Mayor Roberto Córdova's government, after Moraga reportedly "gave an information that involved Cornejo [...] that wasn't veracious," in his program Sin Pelos en la Lengua. Dante Cornejo appeared with his attorney Fabricio Jiménez — who also works as Legal Counsel of the Municipality of Pichilemu, and was Governor of Cardenal Caro Province between 2004 and 2006 — during the trial against Moraga in the Court of Pichilemu. Mario Moraga eventually apologized, retracting his 'defamatory statements', on November 9, 2010.
