= Armando Caroca =

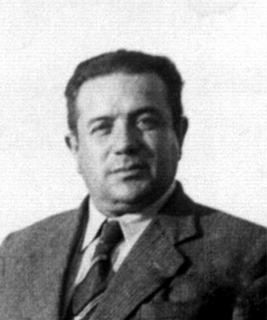

20th Mayor of Pichilemu
- In office 21 May 1944 – 18 May 1947
- Preceded by: Felipe Iturriaga Esquivel
- Succeeded by: Carlos Echazarreta Larraín

Personal details
- Occupation: Civil servant

Armando Caroca Rojas was the 20th Mayor of the commune of Pichilemu, office which he held between May 1944 and May 1947. He was succeeded by Carlos Echazarreta Larraín. He also was a regidor of Pichilemu for several terms.

== Political career ==
Armando Caroca was elected regidor of Pichilemu on 7 April 1935, and took office on 25 May of the same year. He held the position until 1938. In 1944, he was elected mayor of Pichilemu and took office on 21 May 1944, and held the office until three years later, in 1947. During his mayorship, his council was composed of Juan Bautista Lagos T., Augusto Leyton Caro, Julio Magnolfi Luschi, and Manuel Córdova Morales. He was re-elected regidor of Pichilemu for the 1950–53, and 1953–56 terms.

Caroca was a member of the Liberal Party of Chile.

Political offices
| Preceded by Felipe Iturriaga Esquivel | Mayor of Pichilemu; 1944–1947 | Succeeded by Carlos Echazarreta Larraín |
