= Antonio Saldías =

Chilean writer and researcher

Antonio Saldías González
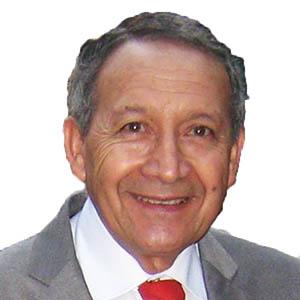
- Saldías in 2015.
- Born: 6 May 1951 (age 74); Santiago, Chile
- Other names: Don Antonio de Petrel
- Education: University of Concepción
- Occupation(s): Writer, historian

Antonio Róbinson Saldías González, also known as Don Antonio de Petrel (born 6 May 1951) is a Chilean researcher and writer. He studied philosophy at the University of Concepción.

== Works ==
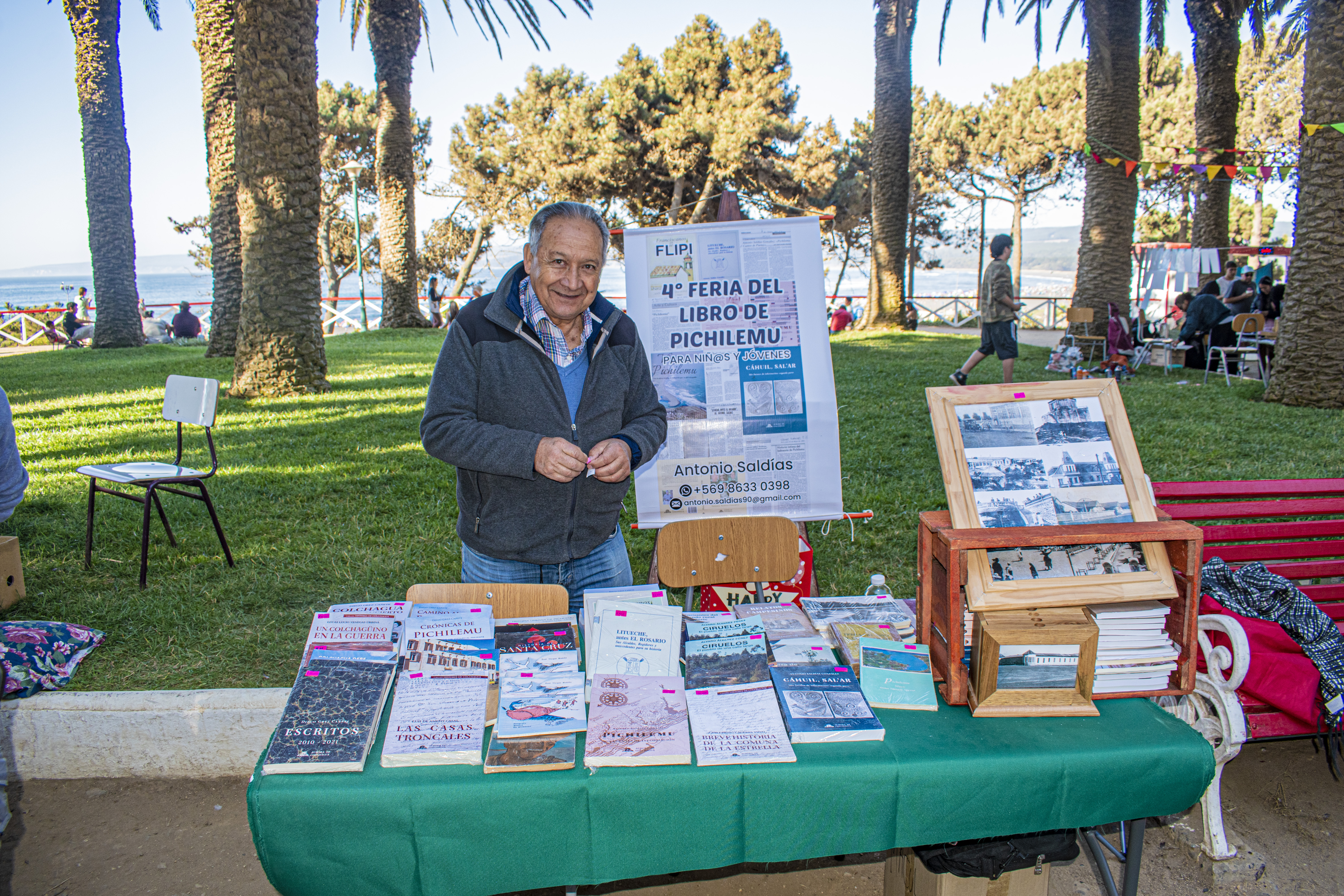
Saldías at the Fourth Pichilemu Book Fair in 2023.

In 1990, Saldías published the book Pichilemu, Mis Fuentes de Información. Prof. Cesar Caviedes, at the Handbook of Latin American Studies of the Library of Congress, notes: "a rather insignificant place on the coast of central Chile is "embellished" in the prose of this local writer".

Three years later, he published Litueche, antes El Rosario; in 1996, published the anthology Pichilemu, Canto de Puetas, that included popular poems by Pichileminian authors such as Antonio Álvarez Gaete, Gerardo Caroca Tobar, Raimundo León Morales, Miguel Becerra Pavez, Pedro Reyes González, Hugo González Urzúa and himself; and Franciscanos en Litueche in December 2004.

Saldías is a collaborator of El Marino.
