= Mayor of Pichilemu =

Elected head of the executive branch of government of Pichilemu, Chile

- Coat of arms

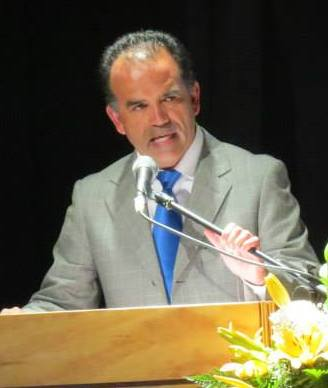
- Incumbent; Roberto Córdova Carreño since 6 December 2024
- Style: No courtesy, title or style
- Appointer: Electorate of the commune of Pichilemu
- Term length: Four years
- Inaugural holder: José María Caro Martínez; 6 May 1894
- Succession: Every 6 December
- Salary: CLP3,304,089 (USD7,054) (as of February 2013)
- Website: pichilemu.cl

The Mayor of Pichilemu is an elected politician who is the head of the executive branch of government of the commune of Pichilemu, Libertador General Bernardo O'Higgins Region, Chile. The mayor presides over the local city council, composed of six members, and serves as the civic representative of the commune. The mayor is popularly elected in a municipal election, by simple majority. The office is held for a four-year term without term limits.

Forty different individuals, including acting mayors, have held the office of mayor since the commune of Pichilemu was created in December 1891. José María Caro Martínez, elected in 1894, was the inaugural mayor of the commune, and served for almost four consecutive terms, interrupted by his resignation in 1905. The current mayor is independent Roberto Córdova Carreño, formerly a Socialist, who was elected in October 2024 and took office on that 6 December.

Some mayors are particularly notable, for example: Conservative José María Caro Martínez (1830–1916), father of José María Caro Rodríguez, the first Chilean Cardinal of the Roman Catholic Church; Radical Carlos Rojas Pavez, the founder of Pichilemu, a newspaper which counted with collaborations of local journalist and historian José Arraño Acevedo and municipal worker Miguel Larravide Blanco; and Christian Democrat Jorge Vargas González (b. 1967), a politician who was forced out of office in two different times, under charges of bribery.

== Background, organisation, and elections ==
On 22 December 1891, President Jorge Montt and his Minister of the Interior Manuel Irarrázabal Larraín promulgated the Autonomous Commune Law (Ley de Comuna Autónoma), creating 195 communes, including that of Pichilemu. At the time, the territory of Pichilemu comprised the former subdelegations of Cáhuil, Peñablanca, and Cocauquén. Three years later, on 6 May 1894, Pichileminians formed the first local government. José María Caro Martínez was elected the first mayor of the commune on that day.

Organisationally, the commune of Pichilemu has a mayor–council form of government. This provides for a commune-wide elected mayor serving in an executive role, as well as a city council serving in a legislative role. The mayor, as the highest authority of the commune of Pichilemu, has the responsibility to direct, manage and supervise the work of the municipality, and legally represents the commune. The mayor is also responsible for administrating the commune's financial resources, and municipal and national goods of public use, presides the local city council, and has the power to delegate his work to other functionaries of the local government, which he may appoint. Additionally, the mayor may give a public account of his gesture to the city council every year, usually in April; an extract of his account may be published to the community. If the mayor dies in office, resigns, or is unable to carry out his/her duties, a councilor may be elected by the city council to replace the former mayor. In the meantime, the municipal secretary may take office as acting mayor. This has happened several times in Pichilemu: following the resignation of René Maturana Maldonado in April 1992, municipal secretary Gustavo Parraguez Galarce took over his office since, at the time, there were no councilors; in November 1998, mayor Jorge Vargas González was convicted of illegally giving a driver's license, and the city council chose councilor Carlos Leyton Labarca until Vargas González resumed his duties in November 1999.

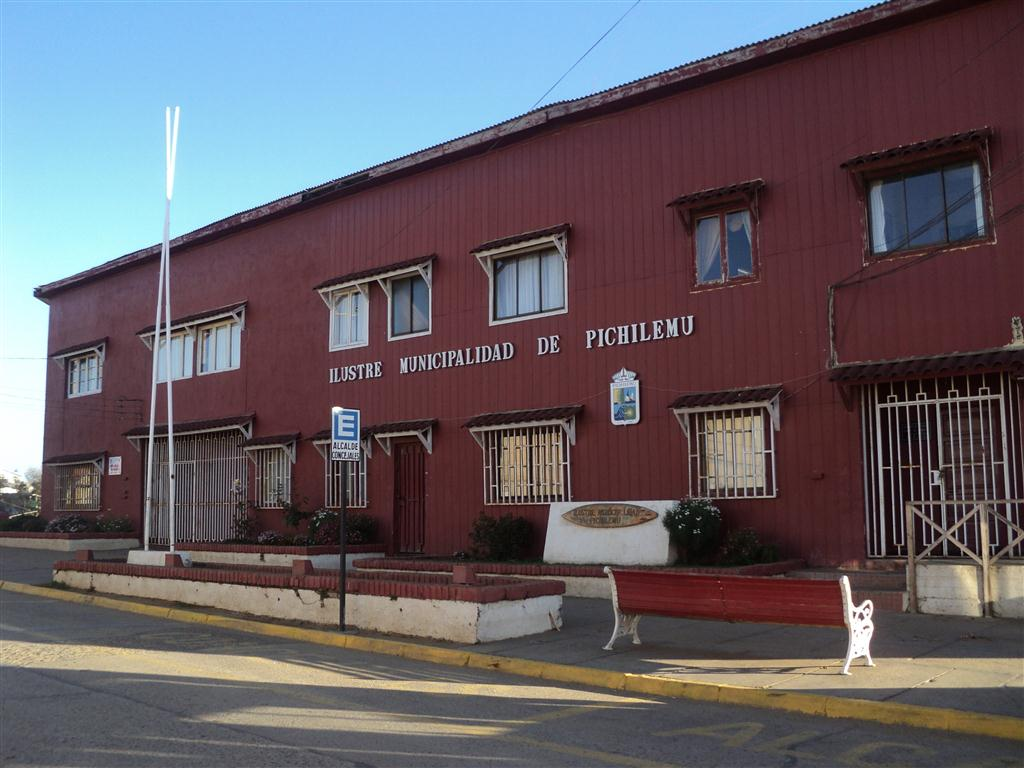
The former Pichilemu City Hall, demolished in 2011–12

Municipal elections, during which mayors are elected, take place every four years; they take place one year before presidential elections (since 2008) in the last Sunday of October. A notable exception was the 2021 municipal election, as it was postponed from October 2020 to April 2021, and then to May 2021, as a result of the COVID-19 pandemic. As a result, the 2016-2020 term was extended until 28 June 2021, while the 2020-2024 term was shortened by nearly seven months. Candidates must comply a number of requisites in order to run for mayor of Pichilemu; those include: to have completed secondary education (Enseñanza Media), to be a citizen, literate, to have resided in the Libertador General Bernardo O'Higgins Region for at least two years before the election, and to have their military status regularized. The mayor is usually sworn in on 6 December following the election. The next election for the mayor will be in 2024. Municipal elections originally elected three mayors, called primer, segundo, and tercer alcalde, and a number of regidores. For example, the results of the first elections in Pichilemu, for the term between 1894 and 1897, showed José María Caro Martínez, Pedro Nolasco de Mira, and Francisco Reyes elected as the first primer, segundo, and tercer alcalde of Pichilemu, respectively. The role of the primer alcalde equals that of the current mayor of Pichilemu. However, voting was not popular: only taxpayers and landowners could vote. According to the Decree #5655 of 4 December 1945, regidores were popularly elected, and they had the faculty to vote for the mayor that would rule for the local government three-year term. The 1973 Chilean coup d'état interrupted Washington Saldías Fuentealba's mayoral term, hence terminating possibilities of new elections. The military regime of Augusto Pinochet appointed seven mayors, who held the office in a period of nineteen years. Following the Chilean transition to democracy, the D'Hondt method of proportional representation was used in the municipal elections of 1992, 1996, and 2000: all candidates run in a single list, the most voted candidate becomes the mayor and other five/six become councilors, according to the aforementioned method. For the municipal elections beginning in 2004, candidates for mayor and councilor run in separate lists, and mayors are elected by simple majority of votes.

== Mayors ==
To date, forty-two different individuals have served as mayor of the commune of Pichilemu. There have been 44 mayoralties, excluding those of acting mayors. Francisco Javier Asalgado, Sergio Morales Retamal, and Carlos Echazarreta Iñiguez have served two non-consecutive terms, while Felipe Iturriaga Esquivel served for three. Roberto Córdova Carreño served three consecutive terms, then another non-consecutive term. Córdova has also served the longest term, between December 2008 and June 2021, over twelve years; and then again, since December 2024. Before Córdova, the longest term was that of José María Caro Martínez, who served eleven years until his resignation one year before his fourth term expired. The shortest term was that of Gustavo Parraguez Galarce, an acting mayor who served only six days between 6 December and 12 December 2008, before the city council elected Roberto Córdova Carreño as the successor of Marcelo Cabrera Martínez, who was under trial at the time. Excluding Parraguez Galarce, the shortest term of a mayor of Pichilemu was that of Osvaldo Sotomayor Ilabaca, which lasted a span of nine days, between 25 February and 6 March 1935. Only one mayor has died in office: Serafín López Lizana died after serving five months as mayor of the commune. Olga Maturana Espinosa is the only woman to have served as mayor.

No.	Portrait	Name	Took office	Left office	Political party	Council
1	Black and white photo of a man wearing a suit	José María Caro Martínez (Note: Caro Martínez retired one year before his fourth term expired. The City Council named Francisco Javier Asalgado as acting primer alcalde. Asalgado served the remainder of Caro Martínez's term and was subsequently re-elected once.)	6 May 1894	7 May 1905	Conservative	1894–97 term: Pedro Nolasco de Mira (segundo alcalde); Francisco Reyes (tercer alcalde); Francisco Cerón (regidor); José Leonardo Lizana (regidor); Ceferino Rosales (regidor); Benjamín Calderón (regidor); Francisco León (regidor); 1897–1900 term: Pedro Nolasco de Mira (segundo alcalde); Juan Bautista Bozo (tercer alcalde); José Santos Arraño (regidor); Pedro N. Fernández (regidor); Juan de la Cruz Galarce (regidor); José Santos Becerra (regidor); José Calderón (regidor); Pedro Pavez Polanco (regidor); 1900–03 term: Francisco Javier Asalgado (segundo alcalde); Juan Francisco Bozo (tercer alcalde); José Luis Fuenzalida (regidor); Manuel Jesús Pérez (regidor); Exequiel Carreño (regidor); José Santos Becerra (regidor); Pedro Nolasco de Mira (regidor); Pedro Pavez Polanco (regidor); 1903–06 term: Francisco Javier Asalgado (segundo alcalde); Juan Francisco Bozo (tercer alcalde); Desiderio Arraño (regidor); José Honorio Morales (regidor); Exequiel Carreño (regidor); José Santos Becerra (regidor); José Domingo Fuenzalida (regidor)
2	Black and white photo of a bearded man	Francisco Javier Asalgado	7 May 1905	3 September 1909	Conservative	1905–06 term: José María Caro Martínez (segundo alcalde); Juan Francisco Bozo Valenzuela (tercer alcalde); José Santos Becerra (regidor); Juan Vargas (regidor); Desiderio Arraño (regidor); José Honorio Morales (regidor); Eugenio Acevedo (regidor); Exequiel Carreño (regidor); 1906–09 term: José Santos Becerra (segundo alcalde); Juan Francisco Bozo (tercer alcalde); Francisco Adriano Caro Rodríguez (regidor); José Honorio Morales (regidor); Eugenio Acevedo (regidor); Nazario Morales (regidor); Nicanor Correa (regidor)
3		Carlos Ignacio Salas Salas (Note: The results of the March 1909 municipal election were controversial, with Francisco Javier Asalgado and Carlos Salas Salas disputing the primer alcalde office. However, an appeals court ruled in favor of Salas in September of that year.)	2 May 1909	3 May 1912	Liberal	1909–12 term: Manuel Aspillaga (regidor); Jorge Vicuña (regidor); Julio Arriagada (regidor); Sabino Piña (regidor)
4	Black and white photo of a bearded man	Francisco Javier Asalgado (Note: Asalgado decided to retire in June 1912, just one month after he began his second non-consecutive term as primer alcalde of Pichilemu. His resignation became effective on 22 September 1912. José Santos Becerra, segundo alcalde was named as acting primer alcalde.)	5 May 1912	22 September 1912	Conservative	1912 term: José Santos Becerra (segundo alcalde); Carlos Ignacio Salas (tercer alcalde); Francisco Adriano Caro Rodríguez (regidor); Luis Bozo Valenzuela (regidor); Desiderio Arraño Ortíz (regidor); José Santos Manríquez (regidor); Feliciano Carvajal (regidor); Geremías Leyton (regidor)
5		José Santos Becerra	22 September 1912	2 May 1915	Conservative	1912–15 term: Desiderio Arraño Ortíz (segundo alcalde); Carlos Ignacio Salas (tercer alcalde); Francisco Adriano Caro Rodríguez (regidor); Luis Bozo Valenzuela (regidor); José Santos Manríquez (regidor); Feliciano Carvajal (regidor); Geremías Leyton (regidor)
6		Gustavo Silva Pizarro (Note: Silva Pizarro was elected for three consecutive terms.)	4 May 1915	4 May 1924	Conservative	1915–18 term: Ernesto Iñiguez Larraín (segundo alcalde); Luis Barahona Fornés (tercer alcalde); Delfín Muñoz (regidor); Miguel Mella (regidor); Desiderio Arraño Ortíz (regidor); Manuel Jesús Cáceres (regidor); José Gil Alvarez (regidor); Geremías Leyton (regidor); 1918–21 term: José Luis Arraño Ortíz (segundo alcalde); Carlos Ignacio Salas (tercer alcalde); Luis Barahona Fornés (regidor); José Honorio Morales (regidor); Francisco Adriano Caro Rodríguez (regidor); Miguel Castro (regidor); José Gil Alvarez (regidor); Froilán Valenzuela (regidor); 1921–24 term: Luis Arraño Ortíz (segundo alcalde); Feliciano Carvajal (tercer alcalde); Miguel Mella (regidor); José Honorio Morales (regidor); Francisco Adriano Caro Rodríguez (regidor); Fidel Rodríguez (regidor); José Gil Alvarez (regidor); Froilán Valenzuela (regidor)
7		Luis Antonio Barahona Fornés (Note: Barahona Fornés resigned on 24 December 1925 to run for deputy. He was elected deputy for the 1926–30 term representing the 10th Departmental Constituency of Caupolicán, San Vicente, and San Fernando. Following Barahona's resignation, Francisco Adriano Caro, son of the first primer alcalde José María Caro Martínez, was named acting primer alcalde.)	4 May 1924	24 December 1925	Conservative	1924–25 term: Luis Arraño Ortíz (segundo alcalde); Felicindo Carvajal (tercer alcalde); Gustavo Silva Pizarro (regidor); Hernán Silva (regidor); Francisco Adriano Caro Rodríguez (regidor); Carlos I. Salas (regidor); Alberto Morales Moraga (regidor)
8		Francisco Adriano Caro Rodríguez	24 December 1925	22 May 1927	Conservative	1925–27 term: Luis Arraño Ortíz (segundo alcalde); Feliciano Carvajal (tercer alcalde); Gustavo Silva Pizarro (regidor); Hernán Silva (regidor); Carlos I. Salas (regidor); Alberto Morales Moraga (regidor)
9	Black and white photo of a smiling man wearing a suit and a tie	Evaristo Merino Canales de la Cerda (Note: Merino Canales de la Cerda was appointed as the first mayor of the Pichilemu neighborhood council (alcalde de la junta de vecinos) by the government of Carlos Ibáñez del Campo. All mayors until 1935 (government of Arturo Alessandri Palma) were appointed by the president in office.)	22 May 1927	14 May 1928	Liberal	1927–28 term: Guillermo Greene Ortega (vocal); Enrique Cristi (vocal)
10		Manuel Camilo Silva	14 May 1928	10 July 1928	Liberal	1928 term: Guillermo Greene Ortega (vocal); Isaías Reyes (vocal)
11		José Ramón Araneda y Araneda	10 July 1928	12 July 1930	Liberal	None
12		Pastor Castro Rojas (Note: A resident of Rancagua, Castro Rojas resigned as mayor because of poor health.)	12 July 1930	27 November 1930	Liberal	None
13		Fernando Maturana Barahona	27 November 1930	16 October 1932	Liberal	1930–32 term: Pedro Pulgar Gómez (vocal); Basiliano Leyton Pavez (vocal)
14	Black and white photo of a man wearing a suit and a hat	Felipe Iturriaga Esquivel	16 October 1932	25 February 1935	Liberal	1932–35 term: Guillermo Greene Ortega (regidor); Osvaldo Sotomayor Ilabaca (regidor); Nepomuceno Urzúa (regidor)
15		Osvaldo Sotomayor Ilabaca	25 February 1935	4 May 1935	Liberal	1935 term: Guillermo Greene Ortega (vocal); Felipe Iturriaga Esquivel (vocal); Nepomuceno Urzúa (vocal)
—		Alberto Morales Moraga	4 May 1935	9 May 1935	Liberal	Unknown
16		Serafín López Lizana (Note: López Lizana died in office, just four months after he was sworn in as mayor of Pichilemu.)	25 May 1935	October 1935	Conservative	1935 term: Humberto Llanos Martínez (regidor); Alberto Morales Moraga (regidor); Ramón Klehmet Genoux (regidor); Felipe Iturriaga Esquivel (regidor)
17		Alberto Morales Moraga (Note: Following López Lizana's death, Morales Moraga took over his role as mayor of the commune until elections were held later in 1935.)	14 October 1935	1 December 1935	Liberal	1935 term: Armando Caroca Rojas (regidor); Ramón Klehmet Genoux (regidor); Felipe Iturriaga Esquivel (regidor); Humberto Llanos Martínez (regidor)
18	Black and white photo of a man wearing a suit and a tie	Humberto Llanos Martínez (Note: Llanos Martínez was elected regidor of Pichilemu in November 1935, and was elected mayor of the commune by his peers in December 1935. He held the position for two consecutive terms.)	1 December 1935	18 May 1941	Conservative	1935–38 term: Armando Caroca Rojas (regidor); Alberto Morales Moraga (regidor); Ramón Klehmet Genoux (regidor); Felipe Iturriaga Esquivel (regidor); 1938–41 term: Lorenzo Arraño Ortíz (regidor); Carlos Silva Prado (regidor); Vicente Richard (regidor); Alberto Morales Moraga (regidor)
19	Black and white photo of a man wearing a suit and a hat	Felipe Iturriaga Esquivel	18 May 1941	21 May 1944	Conservative	1941–44 term: Carlos Silva Pizarro (regidor); Humberto Llanos Martínez (regidor); José Miguel Palominos (regidor); Humberto Gaete Droguett (regidor)
20	Black and white photo of a man wearing a suit	Armando Caroca Rojas	21 May 1944	18 May 1947	Liberal	1944–47 term: Juan Bautista Lagos T. (regidor); Augusto Leyton Caro (regidor); Julio Magnolfi Luschi (regidor); Manuel Córdova Morales (regidor)
21	Black and white photo of a bald man looking straight wearing a suit and a tie	Carlos Echazarreta Larraín	18 May 1947	21 May 1950	Social Christian Conservative	1947–50 term: Humberto Llanos Martínez (PCSC) (regidor); Samuel López Galarce (PCSC) (regidor); Jorge Andonaegui Guzmán (PL) (regidor); Guillermo Bradley Arcos (PR) (regidor)
22	Black and white photo of a man wearing a suit and a tie	Sergio Morales Retamal (Note: According to Antonio Saldías, Morales Retamal reached a "gentleman's agreement" and divided his term with Olga Maturana Espinosa, the first and to date, the only woman mayor of Pichilemu. Morales Retamal was re-elected after Maturana Espinosa's departure.)	21 May 1950	23 May 1951	Liberal	1950–51 term: Carlos Echazarreta Larraín (PCSC) (regidor); Olga Maturana Espinosa (PCSC) (regidora); Ricardo Araya Oliva (PL) (regidor); Armando Caroca Rojas (PL) (regidor)
23	Black and white photo of a woman	Olga Maturana Espinosa	28 May 1951	17 May 1953	Social Christian Conservative	1951–53 term: Carlos Echazarreta Larraín (PCSC) (regidor); Sergio Morales Retamal (PL) (regidor); Ricardo Araya Oliva (PL) (regidor); Armando Caroca Rojas (PL) (regidor)
24	Black and white photo of a man wearing a suit and a tie	Sergio Morales Retamal	17 May 1953	20 May 1956	Liberal	1953–56 term: Carlos Echazarreta Larraín (PCU) (regidor); Enrique Romero Lorca (regidor); Alicia López Galarce (regidor); Armando Caroca Rojas (PL) (regidor)
25	Black and white photo of a man wearing a suit and a hat	Felipe Iturriaga Esquivel	20 May 1956	15 May 1960	United Conservative	1956–60 term: Carlos Echazarreta Larraín (PCU) (regidor); Manuel Córdova Morales (regidor); Alfio Magnolfi Vignolini (regidor, May–June 1956); Peter Mac Donald (regidor, June 1956–May 1960); Sergio Morales Retamal (regidor)
26		Basilio Sánchez Beguiristáin	19 May 1960	19 May 1963	United Conservative	1960–63 term: Carlos Echazarreta Iñiguez (PCU) (regidor); Héctor Greene Valverde (PDC) (regidor); Alberto Araneda Concha (PDC) (regidor); Sergio Morales Retamal (PS) (regidor)
27	A smiling bald man wearing a blue jacket	Carlos Echazarreta Iñiguez	19 May 1963	21 May 1967	United Conservative	1963–67 term: Manuel Córdova Morales (PR) (regidor); Héctor Greene Valverde (PDC) (regidor); Osvaldo Vidal Vidal (PL) (regidor); Washington Saldías Fuentealba (PS) (regidor)
28		Carlos Rojas Pavez	21 May 1967	21 May 1971	Radical	1967–71 term: Flavio Álvarez Jorquera (PN) (regidor); Mario Moraga Cáceres (PDC) (regidor); Carlos Echazarreta Iñiguez (PDC) (regidor); Washington Saldías Fuentealba (PS) (regidor)
29		Washington Saldías Fuentealba (Note: Saldías Fuentealba's term was interrupted by the Augusto Pinochet military regime, who came to power following a coup d'état on 11 September 1973. The military regime appointed a number of like-minded politicians as mayors of Pichilemu until 1984.)	21 May 1971	11 September 1973 (coup d'état)	Socialist	1971–75 term: Osvaldo Vidal Vidal (PN) (regidor); Jorge Díaz García (PS) (regidor); Carlos Echazarreta Iñiguez (PDC) (regidor); Francisco Lorca Espinoza (DR) (regidor)
30	A smiling bald man wearing a blue jacket	Carlos Echazarreta Iñiguez	29 September 1973	10 November 1973	Christian Democratic	None
31		Mario Urrutia Carrasco	7 December 1973	1975	Independent (Note: Between 1973 and 1987 there were no legalised political parties as they were banned.)	None
32	Black and white photo of a man wearing a suit, with his mouth opened	Eduardo Parraguez Galarce	1975	23 May 1979	Independent	None
33	Black and white photo of a man wearing a suit	José Lino Vargas Jorquera	23 May 1979	20 April 1981	Independent	None
34		Julio Waidele Wolff	20 April 1981	16 March 1982	Independent	None
35		Emilio Merino Lacoste	16 March 1982	30 August 1984	Independent	None
36		René Maturana Maldonado (Note: Maturana Maldonado was the last mayor to be appointed by the Pinochet military regime, which remained in power until 1990. His appointment took place on 31 August 1984. In 1989, the Region of O'Higgins Development Council decided that Maturana would stay in office for "good service" reasons, and began a second term on 16 October 1989. Maturana Maldonado resigned in April 1992, and Gustavo Parraguez Galarce, municipal secretary was named acting mayor of Pichilemu. The first municipal election since the return to democracy were held that year.)	31 August 1984	April 1992	Unknown (Note: No source has been found to verify a party affiliation.)	None
—		Gustavo Parraguez Galarce	April 1992	26 September 1992	Unknown	None
37	An old man wearing a black tuxedo, smiling	Orlando Cornejo Bustamante	26 September 1992	6 December 1996	Union of the Centrist Center	1992–96 term: Aldo Polanco Contreras (UCC) (councilor); Raúl Tobar Pavez (Independent) (councilor); Jorge Vargas González (PDC) (councilor); Mariano Polanco Galarce (RN) (councilor); Mario Bichón Cáceres (PDC) (councilor)
38	A crestfallen man wearing a blue jacket	Jorge Vargas González (Note: Vargas González was temporarily removed from his office in November 1998 after he was found to have been abusing his position as judge of the Local Police Court (Juzgado de Policía Local), by illegally giving a driver's license to a local businessman. Councilor Carlos Leyton Labarca was named acting mayor for the time he was being tried in court. Vargas returned to his office in November 1999, and was subsequently re-elected twice.)	6 December 1996	9 November 1998	Christian Democratic	1996–98 term: Aldo Polanco Contreras (Independent-UCC) (councilor); Washington Saldías González (Independent-UCC) (councilor); Mariano Polanco Galarce (RN) (councilor); Carlos Leyton Labarca (Independent-UCC) (councilor); Mario Bichón Cáceres (PDC) (councilor)
—	Man in traditional huaso dressing, wearing a hat and a white jacket, holding a microphone	Carlos Leyton Labarca	21 December 1998	4 November 1999	Independent Democratic Union	1998–99 term: Aldo Polanco Contreras (Independent-UCC) (councilor); Washington Saldías González (Independent-UCC) (councilor); Mariano Polanco Galarce (RN) (councilor); Mario Bichón Cáceres (PDC) (councilor)
—	A crestfallen man wearing a blue jacket	Jorge Vargas González (Note: A process against Vargas was started in March 2003. On 28 March 2006, he was found guilty for the crime of bribery by the Crime Court of Pichilemu. Following the sentence, the mayor office was held by Francisco Vidal Arraño, municipal administrator. Vargas was additionally found guilty bringing witnesses who deliberately lied to the court. The sentence against Vargas marked the beginning of a number of controversies which ended with several mayors being prosecuted under charges of corruption. However, Vargas officially resigned as mayor in July 2007, an action which was unanimously approved by the members of the city council.)	4 November 1999	20 July 2007	Christian Democratic	1999–2000 term: Aldo Polanco Contreras (UCC) (councilor); Washington Saldías González (Independent-UCC) (councilor); Mariano Polanco Galarce (UCC) (councilor); Carlos Leyton Labarca (Independent-UCC) (councilor); Mario Bichón Cáceres (PDC) (councilor); 2000–04 term: Aldo Polanco Contreras (UCC) (councilor); Washington Saldías González (PPD) (councilor); Roberto Córdova Carreño (PS) (councilor); Carlos Leyton Labarca (Independent-Alliance) (councilor); Víctor Rojas González (PDC) (councilor); 2004–07 term: Aldo Polanco Contreras (RN) (councilor); Marcelo Cabrera Martínez (Independent) (councilor); Roberto Córdova Carreño (PS) (councilor); Héctor Cornejo Galarce (UDI) (councilor); Víctor Rojas González (PDC) (councilor); Hernán Garrido Salas (PPD) (councilor)
39	A dark-skinned man wearing a white shirt holding a hot dog in his right hand	Víctor Rojas González (Note: In July 2007, Rojas González was elected by the city council as acting mayor, to complete Jorge Vargas González's term. However, Rojas González's tenure as mayor was interrupted by accusations of bribery. He was a fugitive from justice for several days until 12 September 2007, when he was detained by the Carabineros police. In an audience which lasted for seven hours, he was jailed with former mayor Jorge Vargas González in the prison of Santa Cruz.)	27 July 2007	12 September 2007	Christian Democratic	2007 term: Aldo Polanco Contreras (RN) (councilor); Marcelo Cabrera Martínez (Independent) (councilor); Roberto Córdova Carreño (PS) (councilor); Héctor Cornejo Galarce (UDI) (councilor); Hernán Garrido Salas (PPD) (councilor); Alfonso Aravena González (PDC) (councilor)
—		Gustavo Parraguez Galarce (Note: Parraguez Galarce, municipal secretary, became the Interim (Subrogant) Mayor, until the city council could elect a new mayor. There were several unsuccessful attempts to choose a mayor, until 23 November 2007, when the councilors elected Marcelo Cabrera Martínez as the successor of Rojas González.)	12 September 2007	23 November 2007	Unknown	2007 term: Aldo Polanco Contreras (RN) (councilor); Marcelo Cabrera Martínez (Independent) (councilor); Roberto Córdova Carreño (PS) (councilor); Héctor Cornejo Galarce (UDI) (councilor); Hernán Garrido Salas (PPD) (councilor); Alfonso Aravena González (PDC) (councilor)
40	A bearded white man wearing a suit and a tie looking straight	Marcelo Cabrera Martínez (Note: Marcelo Cabrera Martínez was elected mayor of Pichilemu after a series of unsuccessful attempts by the city council to elect one. Only three days after he took office as mayor, an investigation was started against him for "adulterating receipts". On 26 September 2008, he resigned as mayor for him to be legally able to run as candidate in the 2008 municipal election. However, in October of that year, and some days before the elections took place, he was accused by the Public Prosecutor Jorge Mena, leaving him unable to take office after the elections, which he won.)	23 November 2007	April 2008	Independent	2007–08 term: Aldo Polanco Contreras (RN) (councilor); Roberto Córdova Carreño (PS) (councilor); Héctor Cornejo Galarce (UDI) (councilor); Hernán Garrido Salas (councilor); Alfonso Aravena González (PDC) (councilor)
—	A woman wearing a suit	Marcia González González (Note: González was chosen by the city council to take over Cabrera's vacant, until the "Boletas adulteradas" case ended, or the appeals court of Rancagua allowed Cabrera to return to his post, which eventually occurred.)	16 May 2008	4 June 2008	Unknown	2007–08 term: Aldo Polanco Contreras (RN) (councilor); Roberto Córdova Carreño (PS) (councilor); Héctor Cornejo Galarce (UDI) (councilor); Hernán Garrido Salas (councilor); Alfonso Aravena González (PDC) (councilor)
—	A bearded white man wearing a suit and a tie looking straight	Marcelo Cabrera Martínez	4 June 2008	26 September 2008	Independent	2007–08 term: Aldo Polanco Contreras (RN) (councilor); Roberto Córdova Carreño (PS) (councilor); Héctor Cornejo Galarce (UDI) (councilor); Hernán Garrido Salas (councilor); Alfonso Aravena González (PDC) (councilor)
—		Luis Calderón Gómez (Note: Following Cabrera Martínez's resignation as mayor to be legally able to be a candidate for the office, he appointed Luis Calderón Gómez as the interim mayor, on 29 September 2008. Since Cabrera was prohibited from using public offices in October of that year, Calderón held the mayoralty until 12 November 2008, when the city council elected Hernán Garrido Salas to complete Cabrera's term, which would last until 6 December.)	29 September 2008	12 November 2008	Unknown	2007–08 term: Aldo Polanco Contreras (RN) (councilor); Roberto Córdova Carreño (PS) (councilor); Héctor Cornejo Galarce (UDI) (councilor); Hernán Garrido Salas (councilor); Alfonso Aravena González (PDC) (councilor)
41	Dark-skinned man with his eyes partially closed rests his head with his hands	Hernán Garrido Salas (Note: As Marcelo Cabrera was disabled from taking public offices, the city council was forced to elect a new mayor to complete his term. On 12 November 2008, Hernán Garrido Salas was elected mayor of Pichilemu in a city council meeting, to complete Cabrera's term. A group of forty supporters of Cabrera attempted to spoil the voting, but they were not successful and ended up with their leader Jorge Ganora Arratia, a local businessman, arrested. Garrido Salas was, like Cabrera, being prosecuted on charges of bribery, but he could finish the term.)	12 November 2008	6 December 2008	Party for Democracy	2008 term: Aldo Polanco Contreras (councilor); Roberto Córdova Carreño (councilor); Héctor Cornejo Galarce (PPD) (councilor); Alfonso Aravena González (councilor)
—		Gustavo Parraguez Galarce (Note: Parraguez Galarce was sworn in as mayor of Pichilemu on 6 December 2008 in a public ceremony, and handed over his position to Roberto Córdova six days later, making his tenure the shortest for a mayor of the commune.)	6 December 2008	12 December 2008	Unknown	2008 term: Aldo Polanco Contreras (councilor); Roberto Córdova Carreño (councilor); Andrea Aranda Escudero (councilor); Viviana Parraguez Ulloa (councilor); Juan Cornejo Vargas (councilor); Marta Urzúa Púa (councilor)
—	A brunette-skinned man looking straight to the camera	Roberto Córdova Carreño (Note: The city council elected Roberto Córdova Carreño as the new mayor of the commune in an "extraordinary meeting". Córdova, who was the most voted councilor in the election of October 2008, stayed in the mayor office until Cabrera's return in May 2009.)	12 December 2008	18 May 2009	Socialist	2008–09 term: Aldo Polanco Contreras (RN) (councilor); Andrea Aranda Escudero (Independent-Concertación) (councilor); Viviana Parraguez Ulloa (RN) (councilor); Juan Cornejo Vargas (Independent-PRI) (councilor); Marta Urzúa Púa (PS) (councilor)
—	A bearded white man wearing a suit and a tie looking straight	Marcelo Cabrera Martínez (Note: On 26 March 2009, Cabrera was sentenced on charges of tax fraud to 61 days of pena remitida and was banned for seven years from occupying the position of councilor. The pena remitida lasted until 17 May, and Cabrera resumed his duties as mayor on the following day, with celebrations of his supporters outside the Pichilemu City Hall. In August of that year, however, the Regional Electoral Court determined, following a reclamation by councilors Viviana Parraguez, Andrea Aranda, Marta Urzúa, Juan Cornejo, and Roberto Córdova, that Cabrera lost his citizenship by being banned from being a councilor, and thus he had to resign his position as mayor. The mayorship of Pichilemu was left vacant until 1 September 2009, when the city council once again elected Roberto Córdova as the new mayor.)	18 May 2009	19 August 2009	Independent	2009 term: Aldo Polanco Contreras (RN) (councilor); Roberto Córdova Carreño (PS) (councilor); Andrea Aranda Escudero (Independent-Concertación) (councilor); Viviana Parraguez Ulloa (RN) (councilor); Juan Cornejo Vargas (Independent-PRI) (councilor); Marta Urzúa Púa (PS) (councilor)
42	A brunette-skinned man looking straight to the camera	Roberto Córdova Carreño (Note: The city council of Pichilemu, in an "extraordinary meeting", elected Roberto Córdova as the new mayor of the commune, for the rest of Cabrera's term. Córdova was popularly elected mayor for the first time in the municipal election of October 2012, obtaining 3,507 votes (49.13%). He was sworn in for his second term on 6 December 2012 in a ceremony held at the Municipal Hall (Pista Municipal), which expired on 6 December 2016. He was re-elected to a third term, lasting between 6 December 2016 until 6 December 2020, whose end was postponed because of the COVID-19 pandemic until 28 June 2021.)	1 September 2009	28 June 2021	Socialist	2009–12 term: Aldo Polanco Contreras (RN) (councilor); Patricio Morales Acevedo (Independent-Concertación) (councilor); Andrea Aranda Escudero (Independent-Concertación) (councilor); Viviana Parraguez Ulloa (RN) (councilor); Juan Cornejo Vargas (Independent-PRI) (councilor); Marta Urzúa Púa (PS) (councilor); 2012–16 term: Aldo Polanco Contreras (RN) (councilor); Mario Morales Cárceles (Independent-Concertación) (councilor); Andrea Aranda Escudero (Independent-Concertación) (councilor); Felipe Bustamante Olivares (PCCh) (councilor); Hugo Toro Galaz (UDI) (councilor); Marta Urzúa Púa (PS) (councilor); 2016–21 term: Hugo Toro Galaz (UDI) (councilor); José Luis Cabrera Jorquera (Independent-New Majority) (councilor); Aldo Polanco Contrera (RN) (councilor); Verónica Ramírez Tapia (PS) (councilor); Pablo Martínez Quinteros (UDI) (councilor); Mario Morales Carceles (Independent-New Majority) (councilor)
43	A white man wearing a suit, with a beach background	Cristian Pozo Parraguez	28 June 2021	6 December 2024	Independent (Note: In May 2023, he became a member of the Socialist Party of Chile.)	2021–24 term: Danilo Robles Cáceres (Ind. DC) (councilor); Sofía Yávar Ramírez (RN) (councilor); Tobías Acuña Csillag (UDI) (councilor); Mario Morales Cárceles (Ind. PCCh) (councilor); Hugo Toro Galaz (UDI) (councilor; dead April 2023); José Luis Cabrera Jorquera (Ind. PS) (councilor); Héctor Cornejo Galarce (ind. UDI) (councilor; took office 2023)
44	A brunette-skinned man looking straight to the camera	Roberto Córdova Carreño	6 December 2024	incumbent	Independent	2021–24 term: Pablo Canales Saravia (Ind. FA) (councilor); Aníbal Galarce Sandoval (Ind. UDI) (councilor); Álvaro Álvarez Pérez (Ind. FRVS) (councilor); Sofía Yávar Ramírez (RN) (councilor); Marcelo Cabrera Martínez (Ind. RN) (councilor); José Luis Cabrera Jorquera (Ind. PS) (councilor)

== Timeline ==
The timeline shows changes of the head of the executive branch of the municipality of Pichilemu from its creation in May 1894 until today.

1894–1950

1950–2000

2000–2020

2021–present

== Latest election ==
Candidate	Party	Votes	%
Cristian Pozo Parraguez	Socialist Party of Chile/Contigo Chile Mejor	4,008	25.35
Tobías Acuña Csillag	Independent (Independent Democrat Union)/Chile Vamos	3,124	19.76
Roberto del Carmen Córdova Carreño	Independent	5,937	37.55
Jorge Urzúa García	Independent	2,742	17.34
Valid votes		15,811	
Invalid/blank votes		702	
Total		16.513	100
Registered voters/turnout		19,126	86.34
Source: El Mercurio

== See also ==
- Government of Pichilemu
- Governor of Cardenal Caro
