= Pichilemu City Council =

City Council of Pichilemu in Chile

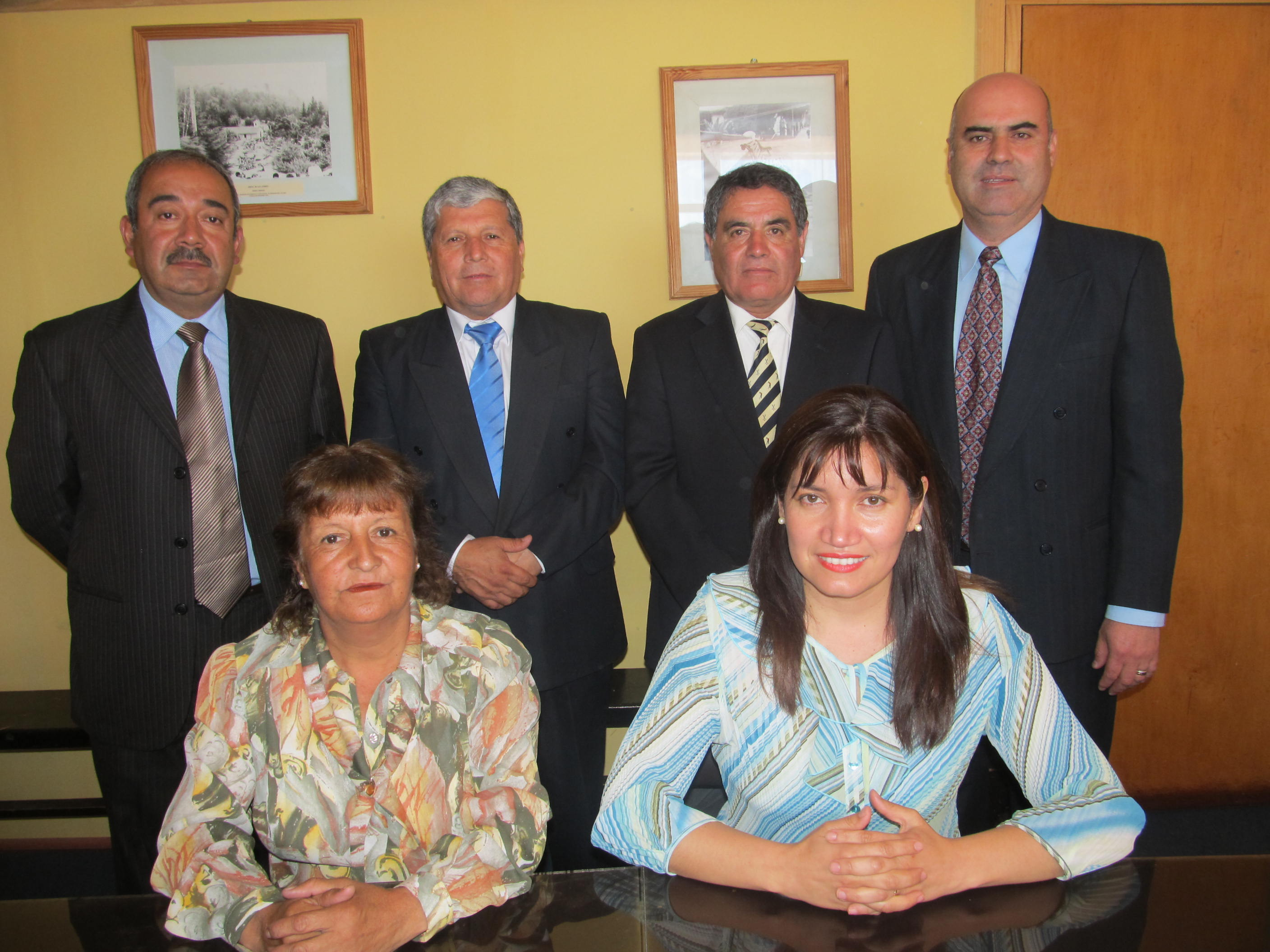
Members of the Pichilemu City Council for the 2012–16 term.

The Pichilemu City Council (Spanish: Concejo Municipal de Pichilemu) is the legislative body of the City of Pichilemu. The council meets in Pichilemu City Hall.

== City Council ==
The City Council consists of seven members, including the Mayor. City council members and the Mayor are chosen by elections every 4 years. The city council is presided by the Mayor.

== Pichilemu City Hall ==
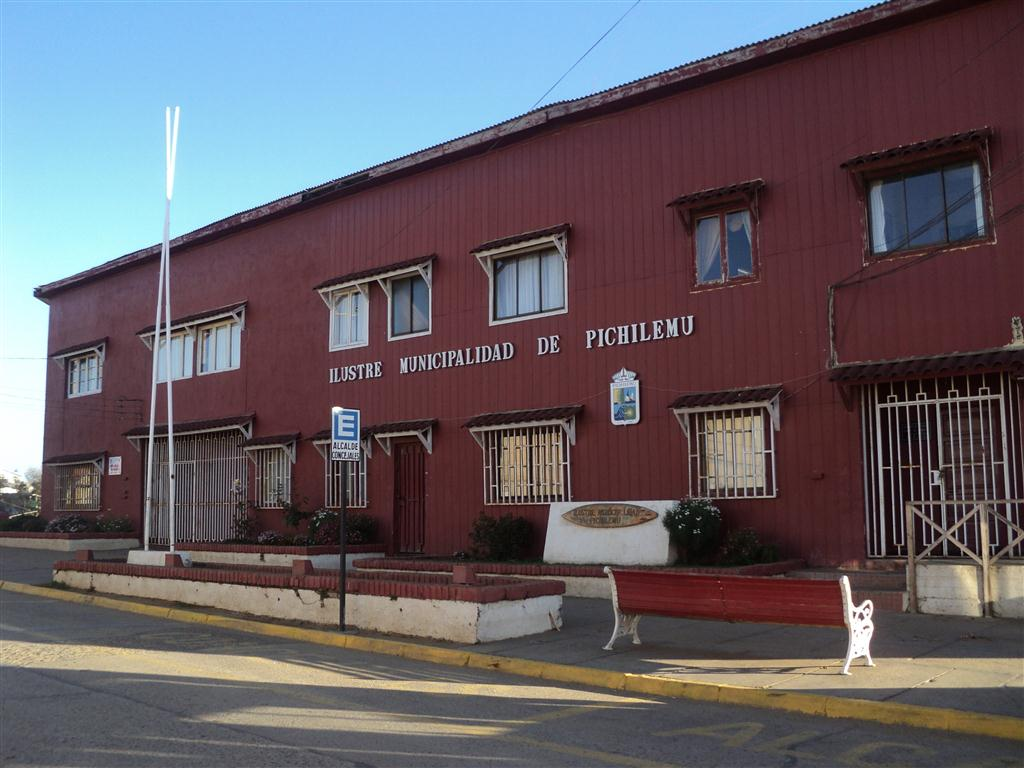
Pichilemu City Hall.

The Pichilemu City Hall served as the city's administrative headquarters. It was constructed from 1891 until May 6, 1894.

The building was located in the Ángel Gaete street, in a terrain of 1,660 square metres (17,900 ft^{2}) that descends suddenly from the street level. It was conformed by a 2-floors building, a zócalo, a complementary construction (260 square metres (2,800 ft^{2})) and a yard. The yard serves as car parking for the municipality trucks, has a store and the corral municipal.

The building was not constructed for that purpose, and worked as four separate parts rather than one unit.

The Pichilemu City Hall was scheduled to be renovated in 2011, by the Government of O'Higgins Region. According to the Municipality of Paredones, the Pichilemu City Hall "will be completely repaired." Mayor of Pichilemu Roberto Córdova said on a Pichilemu City Council meeting that the new City Hall will be constructed with the earthquake reconstruction funds, and it was expected that by late 2011, the construction work will begin.

The Municipalidad de Pichilemu building was demolished between December 2011 and January 2012. No construction work has begun as of March 2012.

== List of councillors ==
2012–2016

- Aldo Polanco Contreras
- Andrea Aranda Escudero
- Hugo Toro Galaz
- Mario Morales Cárceles
- Felipe Bustamante Olivares
- Marta Urzúa Pua
- Roberto Córdova — the mayor

2008–2012

- Pedro Aldo Polanco Contreras
- Andrea Aranda Escudero
- Viviana Parraguez Ulloa
- Juan Cornejo Vargas
- Marta Urzúa Púa
- Patricio Morales Acevedo — since 1 September 2009
- Roberto Córdova Carreño — councillor until 1 September 2009; and mayor since that date
- Marcelo Cabrera Martínez — mayor-elect, occupied office between 18 May 2009 until 19 August 2009 until he was removed

2004–2008

- Aldo Polanco Contreras
- Héctor Cornejo Galarce
- Víctor Rojas González — councillor until 2007, elected mayor by the council and then removed from office
- Hernán Garrido Salas
- Roberto Córdova Carreño
- Marcelo Cabrera Martínez — councillor until Rojas' removal as mayor, succeeding him
- Jorge Vargas González — mayor until 2007

2000–2004

- Carlos Leyton Labarca
- Aldo Polanco Contreras
- Víctor Rojas González
- Roberto Córdova Carreño
- Washington Saldías González
- Jorge Vargas González — mayor

1996–2000

- Carlos Leyton Labarca
- Aldo Polanco Contreras
- Washington Saldías González
- Mariano Polanco Galarce
- Mario Bichón Cáceres
- Jorge Vargas González — mayor

1992–1996

- Mario Bichón Cáceres
- Mariano Polanco Galarce
- Aldo Polanco Contreras
- Raúl Tobar Pavez
- Orlando Cornejo Bustamante — mayor
