= Pichilemu (newspaper) =

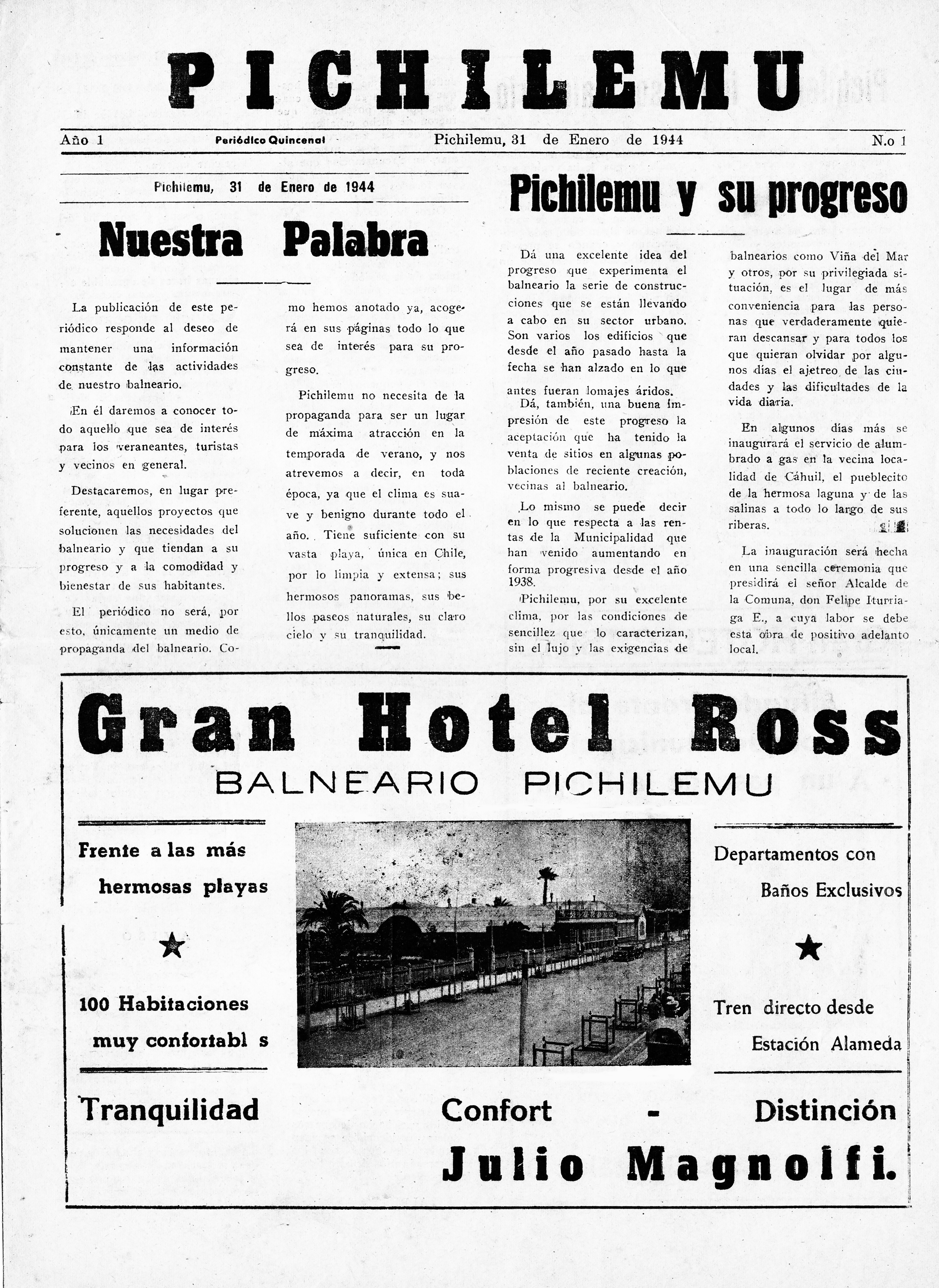
- The January 31, 1944 front page of Pichilemu
- Type: Newspaper
- Editor: Carlos Rojas Pavez (1944–1949); Washington Saldías (1986–1990; 2000–present as Pichilemu News)
- Founded: 1944
- Headquarters: Pichilemu

pichilemunews, formerly Pichilemu (Spanish: Periódico Pichilemu), is a Chilean online newspaper, formerly print, from Pichilemu, first published in 1944 by Carlos Rojas Pavez, municipal secretary and mayor of Pichilemu from 1967 to 1971. Rojas published the newspaper with the collaboration of José Arraño Acevedo and Miguel Larravide Blanco. It was later published by Washington Saldías González between 1986 and 1990, and then again in 1996 by Carlos Carmona Plá. In 2000, Saldías turned it into an online-only newspaper, named Pichilemu News.

== History ==
Carlos Rojas Pavez, who had been working as municipal secretary of Pichilemu since 1937, founded on January 31, 1944, founded the Pichilemu newspaper. Six days before, on January 25, Rojas along with José Arraño Acevedo and Miguel Larravide Blanco made the "Declaration of Release" (Spanish: Declaración de Publicación) to the Governor of Colchagua Province, the only requisite in Chile to publish a newspaper. The first edition of the newspaper was distributed by shoe-polishers and newsvendors (Spanish: canillitas) in the main streets of the city.

Only eight different editions of the newspaper were published in 1944. In September 1949, the ninth and last edition by Rojas was published.

In 1985, Carlos Rojas transferred the publishing rights of Pichilemu to Washington Saldías, who published the tenth edition of the newspaper on January 31, 1986, forty-two years after its first edition. Washington published 28 new editions, between 1986 and 1990.

Saldías' project remained dormant until January 14, 2000, when he founded pichilemunews, the first online newspaper in O'Higgins Region.
