= List of earthquakes in 1985 =

Earthquakes in 1985
Approximate epicenters of the earthquakes in 1985
- 4.0–5.9 magnitude
- 6.0–6.9 magnitude
- 7.0–7.9 magnitude
- 8.0+ magnitude
- Strongest magnitude: 8.1 M_{w} Mexico
- Deadliest: 8.1 M_{w} (Mexico) Mexico; 5,000 deaths
- Total fatalities: 5,300

Number by magnitude
- 9.0+: 0

This is a list of earthquakes in 1985. Only earthquakes of magnitude 6 or above are included, unless they result in damage or casualties, or are notable for some other reason. All dates are listed according to UTC time.

== By death toll ==
Rank	Death toll	Magnitude	Location	MMI	Depth (km)	Date
1	10,000+	8.1	Mexico, Michoacan offshore	IX (Violent)	20.0	September 19
2	177	8.0	Chile, Valparaiso offshore	VIII (Severe)	33.0	March 3
3	71	7.0	China, Xinjiang	VII (Very strong)	6.8	August 23
4	29	5.8	Soviet Union, Tajik Soviet Socialist Republic	IX (Violent)	16.0	August 13
5	23	5.8	China, Yunnan	VII (Very strong)	5.0	April 18

== By magnitude ==
Rank	Magnitude	Death toll	Location	MMI	Depth (km)	Date
1	8.1	10,000+	Mexico, Michoacan offshore	IX (Violent)	20.0	September 19
1	8.0	177	Chile, Valparaiso offshore	VIII (Severe)	33.0	March 3
3	7.6	0	Mexico, Michoacan offshore	VI (Strong)	30.8	September 21
4	7.4	0	Chile, Valparaiso offshore	VIII (Severe)	33.0	March 4
4	7.4	5	Afghanistan, Badakhshan	VIII (Severe)	98.7	July 29
6	7.3	0	Papua New Guinea, New Ireland	VII (Very strong)	33.0	July 3
7	7.2	1	Papua New Guinea, West New Britain	VIII (Severe)	26.7	May 10
7	7.2	2	Chile, O'Higgins	VI (Strong)	37.8	April 9
9	7.1	0	Vanuatu, Torba	VI (Strong)	43.0	December 21
9	7.1	0	Indonesia, Papua	VI (Strong)	10.0	November 17
11	7.0	0	Vanuatu, Torba offshore	VI (Strong)	33.0	November 28
11	7.0	0	Vanuatu, Torba offshore	V (Moderate)	33.0	November 28
11	7.0	71	China, Xinjiang	VII (Very strong)	6.8	August 23
11	7.0	0	Philippines, Central Luzon	V (Moderate)	188.4	April 23
11	7.0	0	Indonesia, Molucca Sea offshore	VII (Very strong)	50.7	April 13

== By month ==
=== January ===
January
- Strongest magnitude: 6.9 M_{w} Indonesia
- Deadliest: 6.1 M_{w} Argentina; 6 deaths
- Total fatalities: 6

Number by magnitude
- 9.0+: 0
- 8.0–8.9: 0
- 7.0–7.9: 0
- 6.0–6.9: 11

- January 21 – A 6.9 magnitude earthquake in Halmahera, Indonesia.
- January 26 – A 6.2 magnitude earthquake in Mendoza Province, Argentina. Six people were killed, at least 238 were injured and about 12,500 homes were destroyed or damaged in the Mendoza area. The earthquake was also felt in La Ligua, Santiago, Coquimbo and Viña del Mar, Chile.

=== February ===
February
- Strongest magnitude: 6.3 M_{w} Solomon Islands
- Total fatalities: 0

Number by magnitude
- 9.0+: 0
- 8.0–8.9: 0
- 7.0–7.9: 0
- 6.0–6.9: 4

- February 23; A 6.3 magnitude earthquake struck the Solomon Islands.

=== March ===
- (Indonesia) March 2 – A 6.7 magnitude earthquake hits Sulawesi. Also felt at Palu.

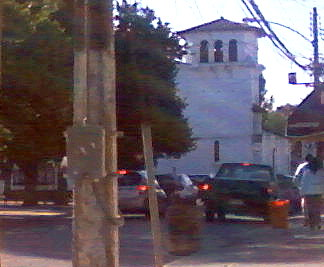
Santa Cruz was amongst the cities damaged by the March 3 Santiago earthquake. Church of Santa Cruz pictured in 2009.

- March 3 – A 7.5 magnitude earthquake occurs near the coast of Central Chile. At least 177 people killed, 2,575 injured and extensive damage in central Chile, including the cities of San Antonio, Valparaíso, Viña del Mar, Santiago and Rancagua. Maximum intensity felt in the Valparaíso area. Extensive ground cracks and subsidence occurred throughout most of the epicentral area. Numerous landslides in the coastal mountains. Felt in Chile along a 2,000 kilometres (1,200 mi) strip from Copiapó to Valdivia. Also felt at Mendoza, San Juan, Buenos Aires and São Paulo. A tsunami generated with wave heights: 1.1 metres (3.6 ft) at Valparaíso; 48 centimetres (1.57 ft) at Hilo, Hawaii; 15 centimetres (0.49 ft) at Sand Point, Alaska; 12 centimetres (0.39 ft) at Adak, Alaska; 11 centimetres (0.36 ft) at Rikitea, Gambier Islands; 10 centimetres (0.33 ft) at Papeete, Tahiti; 10 centimetres (0.33 ft) at Kushiro, Nemuro and Miyako, Japan; 5 centimetres (0.16 ft) at Seward, Alaska; 4 centimetres (0.13 ft) at Kodiak, Alaska; and 3 centimetres (0.098 ft) at Honolulu and Pearl Harbor, Hawaii.
- March 3 – A 7.0 magnitude earthquake occurs near the coast of central Chile.
- March 4 – A 6.7 magnitude earthquake occurs near the coast of central Chile.
- March 4 – A 6.6 magnitude earthquake occurs near the coast of central Chile.
- March 14 – A 4.3 magnitude earthquake hits southern Italy. One person died of fright. Slight damage in Isernia Province.
- (Venezuela) (Netherlands) March 16 – A 6.8 magnitude earthquake occurs in Leeward Islands. Six people injured and damage on Guadeloupe. Minor damage on Montserrat. Also felt on Antigua and Barbuda, St. Kitts and Puerto Rico. Several centimeter local tsunami recorded at Basse-Terre.
- March 17 – A 6.6 magnitude earthquake near the coast of central Chile. One person died from a heart attack at Santiago. Damage in the Valparaíso-Viña del Mar area. Also felt at San Antonio, Melipilla, Santiago, La Serena, Pichilemu, Santa Cruz, Curicó, Talca, and Concepción. Also felt in Mendoza and San Juan Provinces, Argentina.
- (Philippines) March 18 – A 6.5 magnitude earthquake strikes Mindanao, Philippine Islands. Two people died of heart attacks, 25 injured and about 30 buildings destroyed in the Pagadian area. Felt at Zamboanga, Dipolog, Cagayan de Oro, Puerto Princesa, Palawan and Palo, Leyte.
- March 19 – A 6.6 magnitude earthquake hits coast of central Chile. Felt at San Antonio, Valparaíso, Viña del Mar, Santiago, and from Concepción to Coquimbo.
- March 19 – A magnitude 5.2 earthquake hits Bolivia. Two people killed and damage in the Monteagudo area. Felt at Santa Cruz and Sucre.
- March 29 – A magnitude 4.9 earthquake hits Sichuan Province, China. One person killed, 120 injured and some damage in the Neijiang area.

=== April ===
- April 9 – A 7.5 magnitude earthquake hits Central Chile. One person died from a heart attack, several people injured and some damage in the Santiago-Valparaiso area. One additional person died from a heart attack at Chillan. Felt throughout much of central Chile from La Serena to Osorno. Also felt at Mendoza, Argentina, in San Juan, San Luis, Córdoba, Tucumán and Santa Fé Provinces.
- (Indonesia) April 13 – A magnitude 6.7 earthquake hits Molucca Passage. Felt at Manado, Sulawesi.
- April 18 – A 5.8 magnitude earthquake hits Yunnan Province, China. Twenty-three people killed, 300 injured and damage in the Luquan-Xundian area.
- (Philippines) April 24 – A 6.1 magnitude earthquake in Luzon, Philippine Islands. Six people killed, 11 injured and damage and landslides in Benguet Province. Some damage at Baguio. Felt at Carmen, Pangasinan, Baler, Dagupan, Manila and Quezon City.

=== May ===
- May 10 – A 7.3 magnitude earthquake hits New Britain. One person killed. Damage in the Bialla-Hoskins area. Extensive landslides, debris flows and fallen trees in the Nakanai Mountains. Ground cracks and subsidence occurred. A temporary hot springs was observed near Malosi. Felt at Rabaul and strongly in many parts of Papua New Guinea.
- May 14 – A magnitude 6.3 earthquake occurs northwest of Madagascar. Felt at Mtwara and Newala, Tanzania and in the Mocimbao da Praia area, Mozambique. Believed to be the largest instrumentally located hypocenter in this area.
- (South Georgia and the South Sandwich Islands) May 15 – A 6.5 magnitude earthquake hits the South Sandwich Islands region.

=== June ===
- June 3 – A magnitude 7.0 earthquake hits Tonga Islands. Felt at Apia, Western Samoa.
- June 6 – A 6.6 magnitude earthquake shakes Central Mid-Atlantic Ridge.
- June 23 – A magnitude 6.1 earthquake hits Solomon Islands. Felt strongly in the eastern side of the islands.

=== July ===
- (Papua New Guinea) July 3 – A magnitude 7.4 earthquake hits New Britain. Damage, landslides and ground cracks on New Ireland and in the Rabaul area, New Britain. A 1.3-meter tsunami was observed in Rabaul's harbor followed by a seiche that lasted for 15 hours. Also felt at Panguna, Bougainville.
- July 3 – A magnitude 6.7 earthquake occurs in Vanuatu.
- (Papua New Guinea) July 22 – A magnitude 6.9 earthquake hits New Britain.
- July 29 – A 6.6 magnitude earthquake strikes Hindu Kush. At least 5 people killed, 38 injured and considerable damage and landslides in the Chitral and Swat districts, Pakistan. Damage and many people homeless in the Khorog-Ishkashim area, Union of Soviet Socialist Republics (USSR). Extensive damage reported in the Dushanbe and Kurgan-Ush-Tyube area, USSR. The earthquake was felt in the Kulyab and Termez area, in the Leninabad-Samarkand-Tashkent area and at Frunze, USSR. Avalanches reported in northern India. Avalanches and landslides reported in southern Tajikistan, USSR. Felt strongly in northeastern Afghanistan, northern Pakistan and much of northern India, including New Delhi.

=== August ===
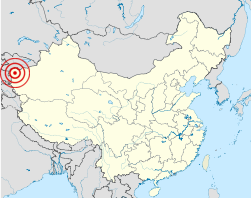
Map showing the location of the epicenter of August 23 China earthquake.

- (Afghanistan) August 2 – A magnitude 6.1 earthquake hits Hindu Kush. Felt at Khorog, Kulyab, Dushanbe, Obigarm, Leninabad, Samarkand, and at Tashkent, USSR. Felt strongly in parts of Kashmir, and felt in a large area of northern India including New Delhi. Also felt in the Peshawar-Islamabad-Lahore area, Pakistan.
- August 4 – A magnitude 5.9 earthquake hits Central California. Six people suffered minor injuries in the Avenal area. Slight damage at Avenal, Hanford, Kettleman City and Lemoore. Felt at Coalinga, Huron, Laton, Burrel, Alpaugh, Waukena, Lost Hills, Creston, Goshen, Templeton, Reedley, California Valley, among others.
- August 7 – A magnitude 5.2 earthquake hits southern Iran. Two people injured and extensive damage at Mahmeleh.
- August 15 – A magnitude 5.0 earthquake hits Hungary. Moderate damage in the Berhida-Peremarton area. Slight damage at Budapest. Felt throughout western Hungary. Felt at Komarno, Nové Zámky, Hurbanovo, and Bratislava, Czechoslovakia. Also felt at Zagreb, Yugoslavia and in Burgenland and at Vienna, Austria.
- August 21 – A 6.1 magnitude earthquake occurs near the coast of Northern Peru. At least 100 people injured, 60 homes destroyed and damage to other buildings in the Chimbote area. Felt along the coast of Peru from Chiclayo to Chincha.
- August 23 – A magnitude 7.2 earthquake hits southern Xinjiang, China. At least 71 people killed, 162 injured, about 15,000 homeless and about 85 percent of the buildings destroyed in the Wuqia-Shufu area. Cracks in highways and sandblows reported in Wuqia County. Slight damage at Kashi. Felt at Sufi-Kurgan, Osh, Namangan, Andizhan, USSR, throughout much of Tajikistan, Kirghizia and Fergana Basin, USSR. Also felt at Rawalpindi, Islamabad and Peshawar, Pakistan.
- August 31 – A magnitude 4.5 earthquake hits the Greece-Albania border region. Some minor injuries, damage and landslides in the Preveza area, Greece.

=== September ===
- September 11 – A 6.4 magnitude earthquake hits southern Xinjiang, China. Four people killed, 61 injured and damage in the Wuqia-Kashi-Shufu area. Felt at Sufi-Kurgan, Osh and at Andizhan and Fergana, USSR.
- (Papua New Guinea) September 16 – A West New Guinea region is affected by a 6.3 magnitude earthquake. At least 10 people killed, 7 injured and damage in the Enarotali area. Slumping observed in the epicentral area.

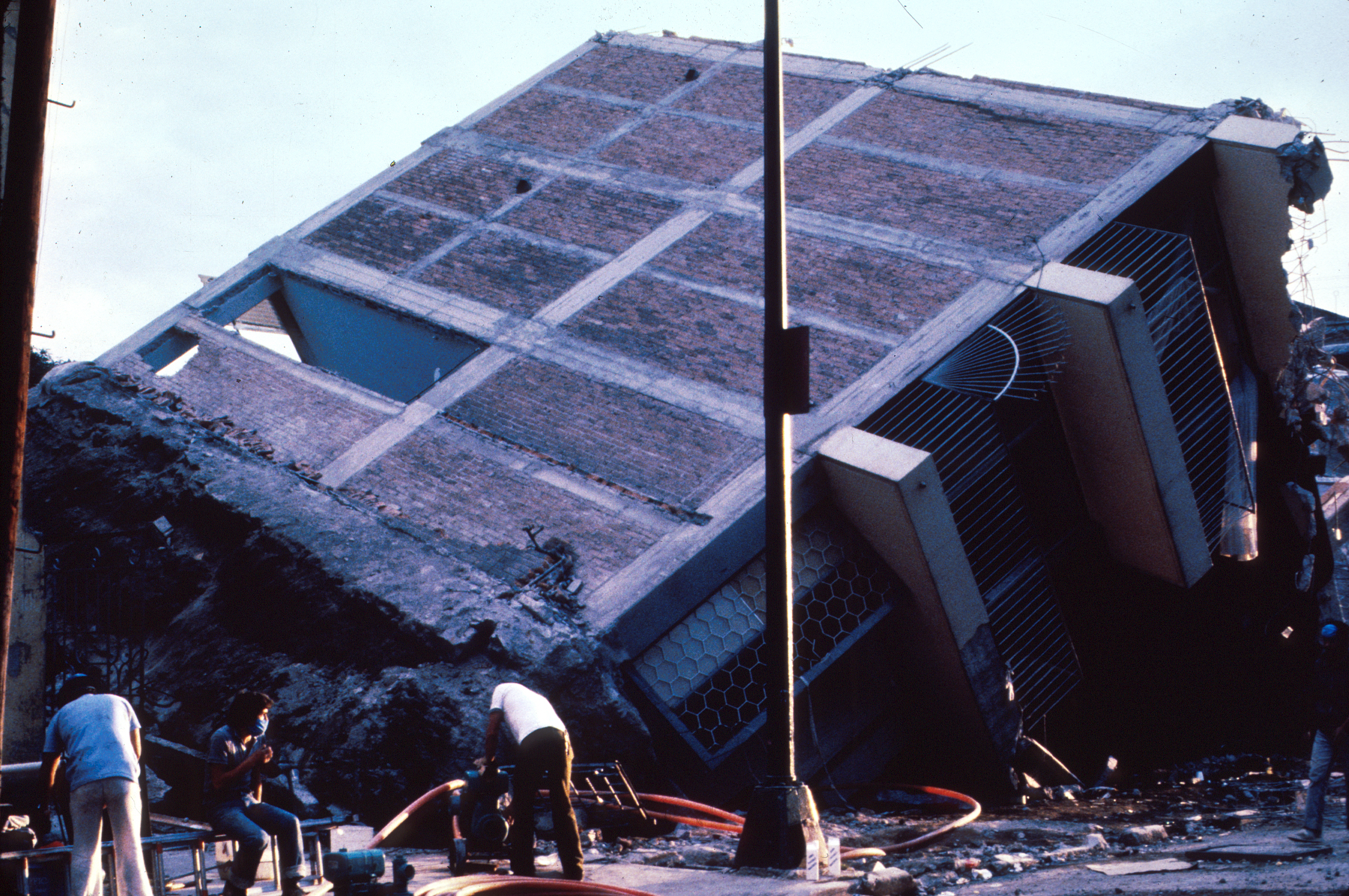
Damage provoked by the September 19 Mexico earthquake.

- September 19 – A magnitude 8.1 earthquake hits Michoacán, Mexico. At least 10,000+ people were killed, about 30,000 were injured, more than 100,000 people were left homeless, and severe damage was caused in parts of Mexico City and in several states of central Mexico. It is estimated that the quake seriously affected an area of approximately 825,000 square kilometres (319,000 sq mi), caused between 3 and 4 billion U.S. dollars of damage, and was felt by almost 20 million people. Four hundred twelve buildings collapsed and another 3,124 were seriously damaged in Mexico City. About 60 percent of the buildings were destroyed at Ciudad Guzmán, Jalisco. Damage also occurred in the states of Colima, Guerrero, Mexico, Michoacán, Morelos, parts of Veracruz and in other areas of Jalisco. The maximum Modified Mercalli intensity was IX at Mexico City, Ciudad Guzmán and the Pacific Coast towns of Lázaro Cárdenas, Ixtapa and La Unión. Felt reports were received from Mazatlan, Sinaloa to Tuxtla Gutierrez, Chiapas, and as far away as Guatemala City, and Houston, Texas. The quake was also felt at Brownsville, McAllen, Corpus Christi, Ingram and El Paso, Texas. It was felt very strongly by people on board the ship Nedlloyd Kyoto, who were in 17°35.4′N 102°36.9′W. Landslides caused damage at Atenquique, Jalisco and near Jala, Colima. Rockslides were reported along the highways in the Ixtapa area and sandblows and ground cracks were observed at Lázaro Cardenas. A tsunami was generated which caused some damage at Lázaro Cardenas, Zihuatanejo and Manzanillo. Estimated wave heights were 3 metres (9.8 ft) at Zihuatanejo and 2.8 metres (9.2 ft) at Lázaro Cardenas. Tide stations recorded maximum wave heights of 1.4 metres (4.6 ft) meters at Acapulco; 60 centimetres (2.0 ft) at La Libertad, Ecuador; 58 centimetres (1.90 ft) at Acajutla, El Salvador; 24 centimetres (0.79 ft) at Kahului, Hawaii and at Pago Pago, American Samoa; 22 centimetres (0.72 ft) at Hilo, Hawaii; 21 centimetres (0.69 ft) at Baltra Island, Galapagos; 14 centimetres (0.46 ft) at Apia, Samoa; 7 centimetres (0.23 ft) at Rikitea, Gambier Islands; and 5 centimetres (0.16 ft) at Papeete, Tahiti. Some ships off the Pacific coast of Mexico observed unusually heavy seas up to 30 meters high near the time of the earthquake. Seiches were observed in East Galveston Bay, Texas and in swimming pools in Texas, New Mexico, Colorado and Idaho. Water well fluctuations were recorded at Ingleside, Texas; Santa Fe, New Mexico; Rolla, Missouri; Hillsborough County, Florida; and Smithsburg, Maryland. A large percentage of the buildings which were damaged in Mexico City were between 8 and 18 stories high, indicating possible resonance effects with dominant two-second period horizontal ground accelerations which were recorded in the area.
- September 20 – A magnitude 7.6 earthquake occurs near the coast of Guerrero, Mexico. Caused additional casualties and damage in the Mexico City area. Felt in many parts of central Mexico. Local tsunami recorded at Acapulco with maximum amplitude of 1.4 metres (4.6 ft). Water well fluctuations recorded at Santa Fe, New Mexico.
- September 26 – A magnitude 7.0 earthquake hits south of Kermadec Islands, New Zealand. Felt on Raoul Island. Also felt in the eastern and southern parts of North Island and at Christchurch and Dunedin, South Island, New Zealand.
- September 27 – A magnitude 6.8 earthquake hits Solomon Islands. Several houses destroyed. Felt at Viso and Honiara. Felt throughout Guadalcanal. Several landslides in southern Guadalcanal.
- (Socialist Federal Republic of Yugoslavia) September 28 – A magnitude 5.0 earthquake hits Yugoslavia. Sixteen people injured and about 500 buildings damaged in the Demir Kapija-Negotino area.

=== October ===
- October 4 – A magnitude 6.2 earthquake occurs near the east coast of Honshu, Japan. Eighteen people injured. Felt at Tokyo, Nikko, Tateyama, Kumagaya, Mito, Kofu, Maebashi, Obihiro, Hokkaido, south to Hachijo-jima and west to Toyooka.
- October 4 – A magnitude 5.2 earthquake hits Malagasy Republic (current Madagascar). One person injured at Ambatondrazaka. Felt at Antananarivo.
- October 5 – A 6.8 magnitude earthquake hits the northwest territories of Canada. Slight damage at Wrigley, Nahanni Butte and Fort Liard. Felt at Fort Simpson. Numerous landslides observed in the epicentral area. Felt in parts of Yukon Territory, British Columbia, Alberta and Saskatchewan. Also felt at Juneau, Skagway and Sitka, Alaska. Fluctuation of well water levels observed at Rolla, Missouri.
- (United States) October 9 – A magnitude 6.6 earthquake hits the south of Alaska. Slight damage at Sand Point. Felt at Cold Bay, Chignik Lake and Chignik Lagoon. Also felt at False Pass, King Cove, Perryville and Port Heiden.
- October 11 – A magnitude 4.5 earthquake in Guatemala. Several people injured and about 500 houses destroyed at San Miguel Uspantán. About 80 percent of the buildings in the town sustained some damage. Felt strongly in western Guatemala. Felt also at Guatemala City.
- October 13 – A 5.9 magnitude earthquake hits Tajikistan, Soviet Union. At least 29 people killed, 80 injured and about 8,000 homeless in the Kayrakkum-Gafurov area. About 90 percent of multi-story brick buildings destroyed at Kayrakkum and about 900 buildings destroyed at Gafurov. Damage at Leninabad. Landslides also occurred in the area. Reported felt at Isfara, Proletarsk, Tashkent, the Fergana Basin, Samarkand, in the Dushanbe-Kulyab area, and at Khorog.
- October 27 – A 5.9 earthquake hits Algeria. Six people killed and damage in the Constantine-Skikda area. Felt in the Annaba-Setif-Souk Ahras area.
- October 29 – A magnitude 6.6 earthquake hits east of Papua New Guinea. Felt at Arawa, Panguna, Bougainville, and at Alotau, New Guinea.
- October 29 – A magnitude 5.4 earthquake hits Michoacán, Mexico. Thirteen people injured because of panic in the Mexico City area.

=== November ===
- November 7 – A magnitude 5.1 earthquake hits Turkey. Fourteen people injured and at least 113 houses damaged in the Erzurum area.
- (India) November 16 – A 6.6 magnitude earthquake occurs in the mid-Indian rise.
- (Indonesia) November 17 – A 6.9 magnitude earthquake hits the West Irian region. Damage at Manokwari. Felt strongly in many parts of West Irian.
- November 28 – A magnitude 7.2 earthquake hits Vanuatu Islands.
- November 28 – A magnitude 7.6 earthquake hits Vanuatu Islands.

=== December ===
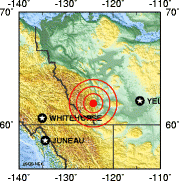
Epicenter location of the December 23 Canada earthquake.

- December 16 – A magnitude 6.1 earthquake hits Nicaragua. Six people injured by landslides and damage in the Rivas-Masaya area. Felt strongly along the Pacific coast of Nicaragua. Felt at Los Chiles, Liberia, Upala, Tilaran, Puntarenas, Atenas, San José, Costa Rica, and San Salvador, El Salvador.
- December 16 – A magnitude 6.8 earthquake hits Vanuatu Islands.
- December 21 – Two earthquakes, magnitude 7.6 and 6.5 hit Vanuatu Islands.
- December 23 – A magnitude 6.6 earthquake occurs in the northwest territories of Canada. Felt at Fort Simpson, Wrigley, and Fort Liard. Some people fled from buildings in Edmonton, Alberta about 1,100 kilometres (680 mi) from the epicenter. Felt in parts of Yukon Territory, British Columbia, Alberta, Saskatchewan and Manitoba. Also felt at Camas, Washington; Grand Forks, North Dakota; Metlakatla, Alaska; Juneau, Alaska; Helena, Montana; and Spokane, Washington.
- December 25 – A 4.3 magnitude earthquake in Sicily. One person killed, 14 injured and damage on Sicily. Mt. Etna erupted.
- (Indonesia) December 27 – A magnitude 6.5 earthquake hits southern Sumatra. Felt strongly at Metro and Tanjungkarang-Telukbetung. Also felt at Jakarta, Java.
- December 28 – A 6.6 magnitude earthquake strikes the Vanuatu Islands.
