= 2010 Pichilemu earthquakes =

Intraplate earthquakes in Chile

2010 Pichilemu earthquakes Terremoto de Pichilemu de 2010
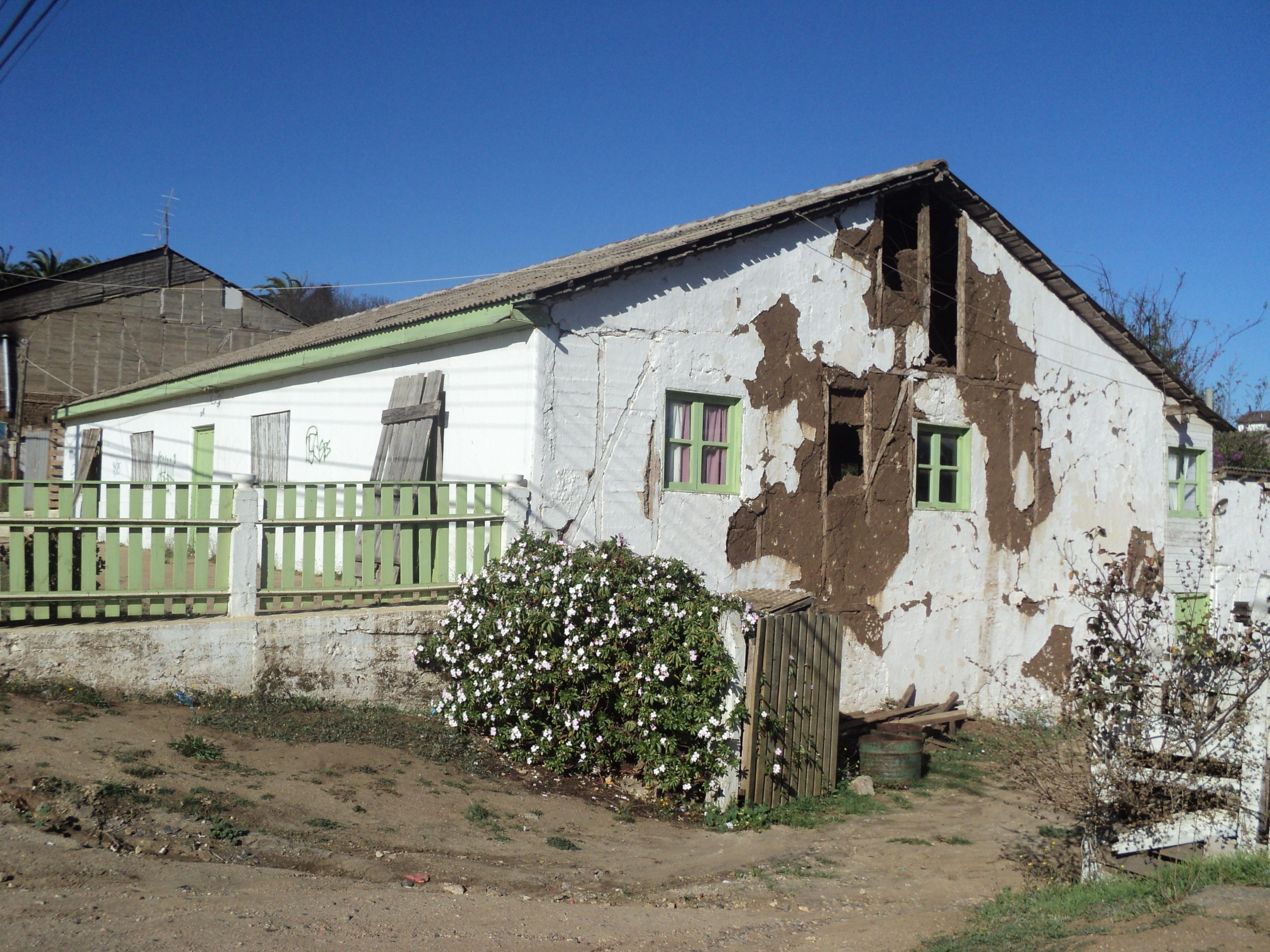
- Above: House damaged by the Pichilemu earthquakes, in the epicentre town, as seen on 16 April 2011. Below: Shakemap for the first of the Pichilemu earthquakes produced by the United States Geological Survey

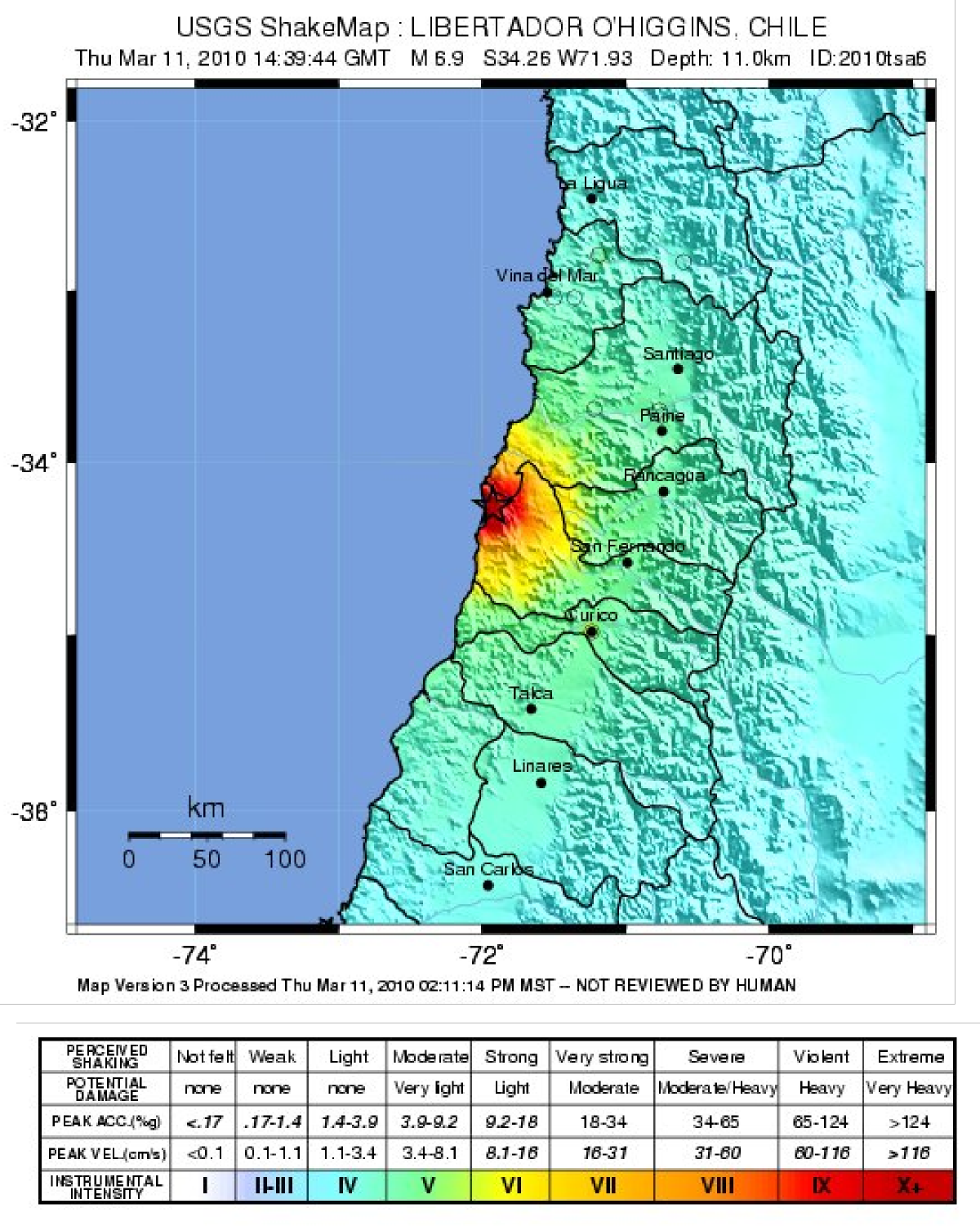
- UTC time: 2010-03-11 14:39:43; 2010-03-11 14:55:27
- ISC event: 14554049; 14400686
- USGS-ANSS: ComCat; ComCat
- Local date: 11 March 2010
- Local time: 11:39 UTC-3; 11:55 UTC-3
- Magnitude: 6.9 M_{w}; 7.0 M_{w}
- Depth: 33.1 kilometres (20.6 mi); 31.0 kilometres (19.3 mi)
- Epicenter: Pichilemu, Chile; 34.301°S 72.13°W
- Areas affected: Chile; Argentina
- Max. intensity: MMI X (Extreme)
- Peak acceleration: 0.086 g (Curicó, Maule)
- Tsunami: Yes
- Casualties: 1 dead

The 2010 Pichilemu earthquakes (Spanish: Terremoto de Pichilemu de 2010), also known as the Libertador O'Higgins earthquakes, were a pair of intraplate earthquakes measuring 6.9 and 7.0 M_{w} that struck Chile's O'Higgins Region on 11 March 2010 about 16 minutes apart. The earthquakes were centred 15 kilometres (9.3 mi) northwest of the city of Pichilemu.

The earthquakes were caused by increased regional stress arising from an earthquake on 27 February, centered offshore Maule Region, which was felt throughout central Chile. The Hawaii-based Pacific Tsunami Warning Center pointed out the possibility of local tsunamis within 100 kilometres (62 mi) of the epicentre, although small, but violent waves were seen in the Pichilemu and Bucalemu area. One person was reported dead. At least eleven aftershocks immediately followed, causing panic throughout coastal towns between the Coquimbo and Los Lagos regions.

The earthquakes were especially destructive in the epicentre town, Pichilemu, capital of Cardenal Caro Province. The city hosts five National Monuments of Chile, of which two, the Agustín Ross Park and the Agustín Ross Cultural Centre, were seriously damaged by the earthquake. They also damaged the villages of La Aguada and Cardonal de Panilonco. Rancagua, the capital of O'Higgins Region, was also damaged, leading President Sebastián Piñera to declare a state of catastrophe in that region.

== Background ==
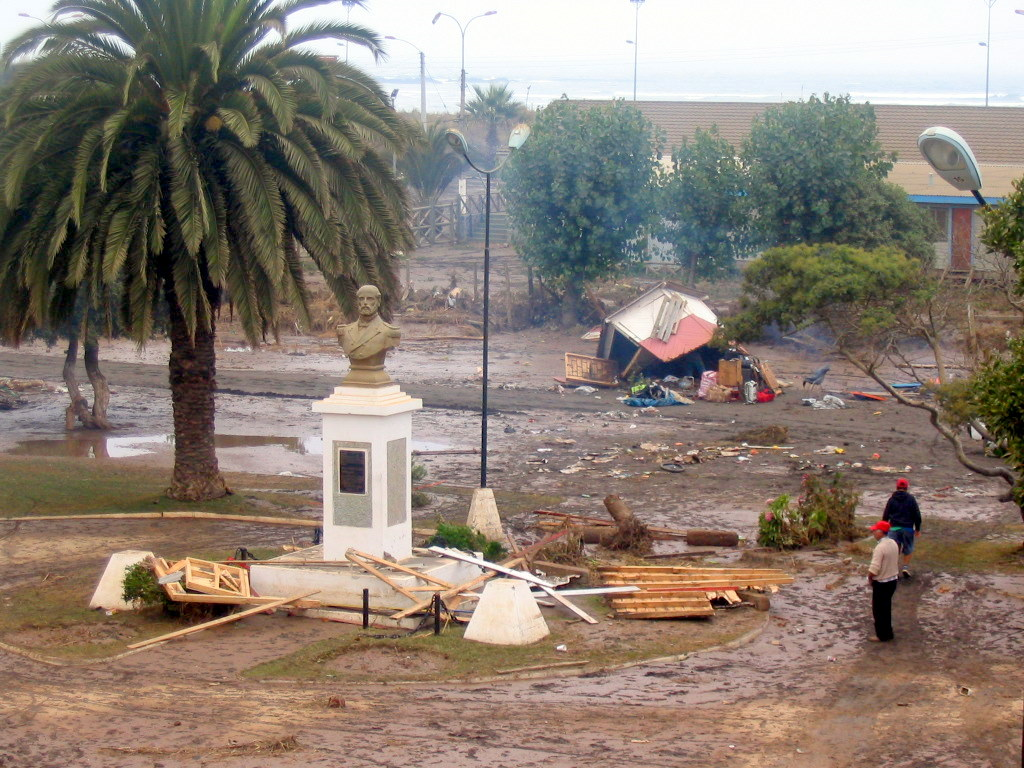
The city of Pichilemu suffered major damage in the 27 February 2010 earthquake and tsunami.

Nearly all of the territory of Chile lies above the convergent boundary where the Nazca plate subducts beneath the South American plate at a rate of about 71 mm per year. Earthquakes occur along the plate interface and in both the subducting and overriding plates. Within the South American plate shallow earthquakes occur on reverse, normal and strike-slip faults. The subduction zone along the Chilean coast produced the most powerful earthquake ever recorded, the 1960 Valdivia earthquake. Some earthquakes which occurred near the epicentre of the 11 March 2010 event are the 1985 Algarrobo and Rapel Lake earthquakes.

On 27 February 2010, a strong earthquake, which reached a magnitude of 8.8 on the moment magnitude scale, hit central Chile. The earthquake occurred in the region of the plate boundary between the Nazca and South American plates, offshore Maule Region. The earthquake produced a tsunami which caused great damage in cities and towns along the Chilean coast; Pichilemu was badly damaged after the earthquake and tsunami struck.

The 6.9 and 7.0 earthquakes of 11 March 2010 occurred two weeks after the 27 February event. Chilean seismologists, including Sergio Barrientos from the University of Chile Seismological Service, had suggested that the absence of an aftershock greater than magnitude 6 following the 27 February quake indicated that there remained energy with the potential to be released. Two foreshocks of the 11 March events occurred on 5 March: one reached magnitude 5.7, and the other magnitude 5.2; both were felt between the Valparaíso and Maule regions.

== Earthquake sequence ==
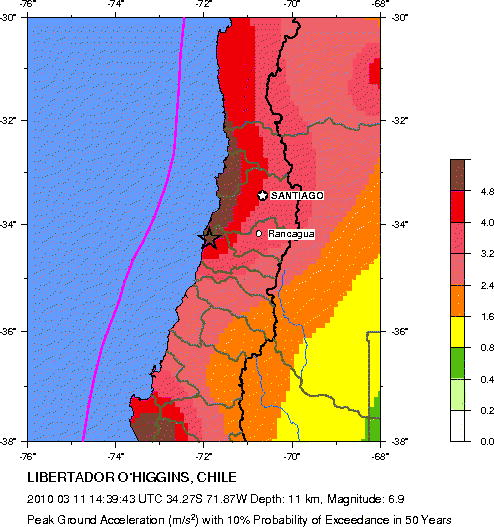
Seismic hazard near the epicentre of the earthquakes.

The Pichilemu earthquakes were caused by the change in regional stress from the 27 February earthquake. Preliminary analyses by the United States Geological Survey (USGS) of the 11 March earthquake locations and seismic-wave radiation patterns suggested that the events resulted from normal faulting within the subducting Nazca plate or the overriding South America plate, unlike the 27 February earthquake, which occurred as thrust faulting on the interface between the two plates. Later in 2010, University of Chile Seismologist Sergio Barrientos stated that the earthquakes were produced inside the South American plate.

The earthquakes' depths were estimated as 33.1 kilometres (20.6 mi) and 31.0 kilometres (19.3 mi) by the University of Chile Seismological Service (Servicio Sismológico de la Universidad de Chile), and 11 kilometres (6.8 mi) and 18.0 kilometres (11.2 mi) by the USGS.

On 15 March 2010, seismologist Mario Pardo from the University of Chile Seismological Service ruled out that Pichilemu was experiencing a seismic swarm, after public concerns about the continued aftershocks in the area; as of that date, more than 50 aftershocks had occurred in the area, the strongest of them measuring 6.7 in the moment magnitude scale, minutes after the initial quake. From the pattern of aftershocks, it has been suggested that the earthquakes originated from rupture along a previously unknown geological fault, the Pichilemu Fault, between Pichilemu and the commune of Vichuquén in Maule Region, at 15 km depth, 40 km in length and 20 km wide. At first it was not known whether this fault was formed during the earthquakes or if it was just reactivated, however geologist José Cembrano from the University of Chile affirmed that "[the fault] corresponds to a long life fault, in a million years time, whose activity had not been detected before."

In a 2012 publication titled Aftershock Seismicity of the 27 February 2010 Mw 8.8 Maule Earthquake Rupture Zone, it was stated that, in total, 10,000 aftershocks were located in the Pichilemu area for the first six months after the mainshock; this pronounced crustal aftershock activity with mainly normal faulting mechanisms found in approximately a 30 kilometres (19 mi) wide region, with sharp inclined borders and oriented oblique to the trench.

== Reaction ==
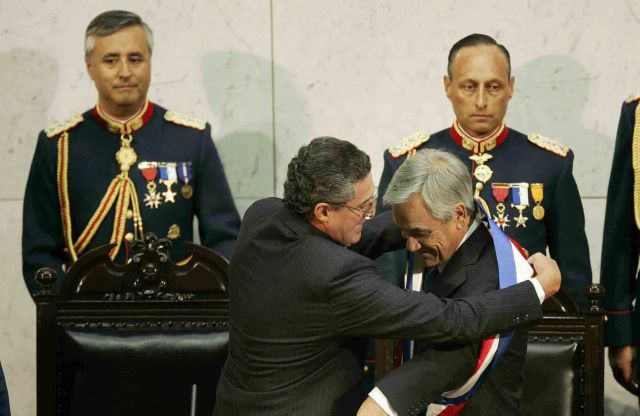
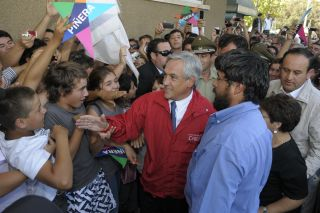
The earthquake took place just minutes before President Sebastián Piñera was sworn in at the National Congress of Chile. (left) President Piñera visited Rancagua the same day. (right)

The earthquakes took place minutes before the new President of Chile, Sebastián Piñera, was sworn in, at about 12:15 local time, at the Chilean congress in Valparaíso, where the shaking was clearly felt. Piñera was at the Palace of Cerro Castillo at the time of the earthquakes, and as he left the palace, he was seen "looking worried"; Michelle Bachelet, the outgoing president, was also seen "worried" by the earthquakes as she entered the Congress. La Nación newspaper reported some journalists attempted to flee the Congress building. According to Spanish newspaper El Mundo, there was "nervousness" at the ceremony, and the ceremony narrator called for calm, adding that the Congress building could even stand stronger earthquakes.

Presidents Néstor Kirchner of Argentina, Evo Morales of Bolivia, Álvaro Uribe of Colombia, Rafael Correa of Ecuador, and Fernando Lugo of Paraguay were present at the ceremony, but television footage showed that the inauguration was not interrupted, even though there was a tsunami warning in place; however, it was reported the ceremony was concluded more quickly than planned.

President Piñera cancelled the ceremonial lunch with his visitors and traveled to Rancagua, one of the cities most affected by the earthquakes; Piñera subsequently declared a catastrophe state in O'Higgins Region as a result of the earthquakes, and appointed Army General Antonio Yackcich as Area Commander in Chief (Jefe de Plaza) for the region, while he was visiting Rancagua that day. The declaration meant that "the military would occupy the area to keep order and prevent the kind of looting that occurred in Concepción during the first two to three days after last month's quake", according to The New York Times.

== Tsunami ==
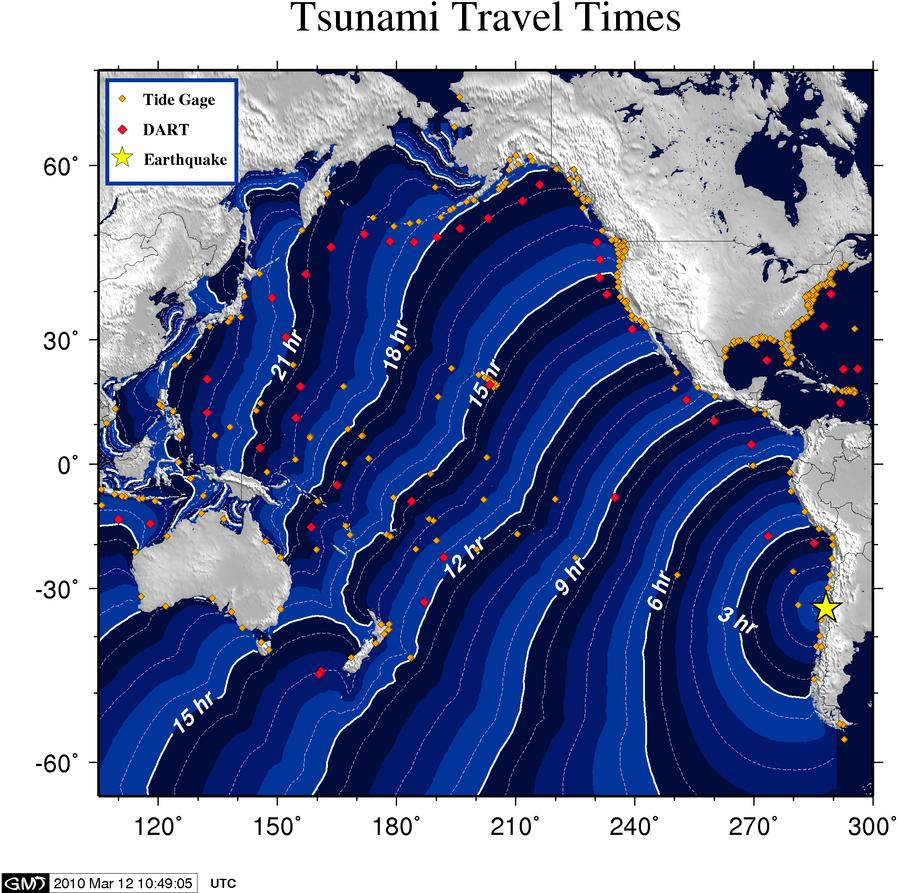
Travel time map of the tsunami triggered by the 11 March 2010 Pichilemu earthquake.

A Pacific-wide tsunami warning was not issued by the Pacific Tsunami Warning Center, although the organization pointed out the possibility of local tsunamis within 100 kilometres (62 mi) of the epicentre, roughly the area between La Serena and Concepción. Half an hour after the first earthquake, the Hydrographic and Oceanographic Service of the Chilean Navy (Servicio Hidrográfico y Oceanográfico de la Armada, SHOA) issued a tsunami warning for the area between Coquimbo and Los Lagos regions, as a way of "keeping people protected" against the possible occurrence of new tsunamis. President Piñera urged coastal residents to move to higher ground in case of a tsunami. Following the tsunami alert, thousands of residents of central Pichilemu fled to La Cruz Hill, with some of them staying there for several days, and received advice from members of the Army. People from the village of Cáhuil stayed at Cordón. The tsunami warning emitted by SHOA was lifted that same day at around 15:50 local time.

According to a preliminary report by the National Office of Emergency of the Interior Ministry (Oficina Nacional de Emergencias del Ministerio del Interior, ONEMI) on 11 March 2010, only 'small waves, without any [special] kind of characteristics' were seen in the area surrounding Pichilemu, while the USGS reported a small tsunami, with sea wave heights of 16 centimetres (0.525 ft) at Valparaíso, and 29 centimetres (0.951 ft) at San Antonio. Interior Minister Rodrigo Hinzpeter reported violent waves in Pichilemu and Bucalemu.

== Damage and casualties ==
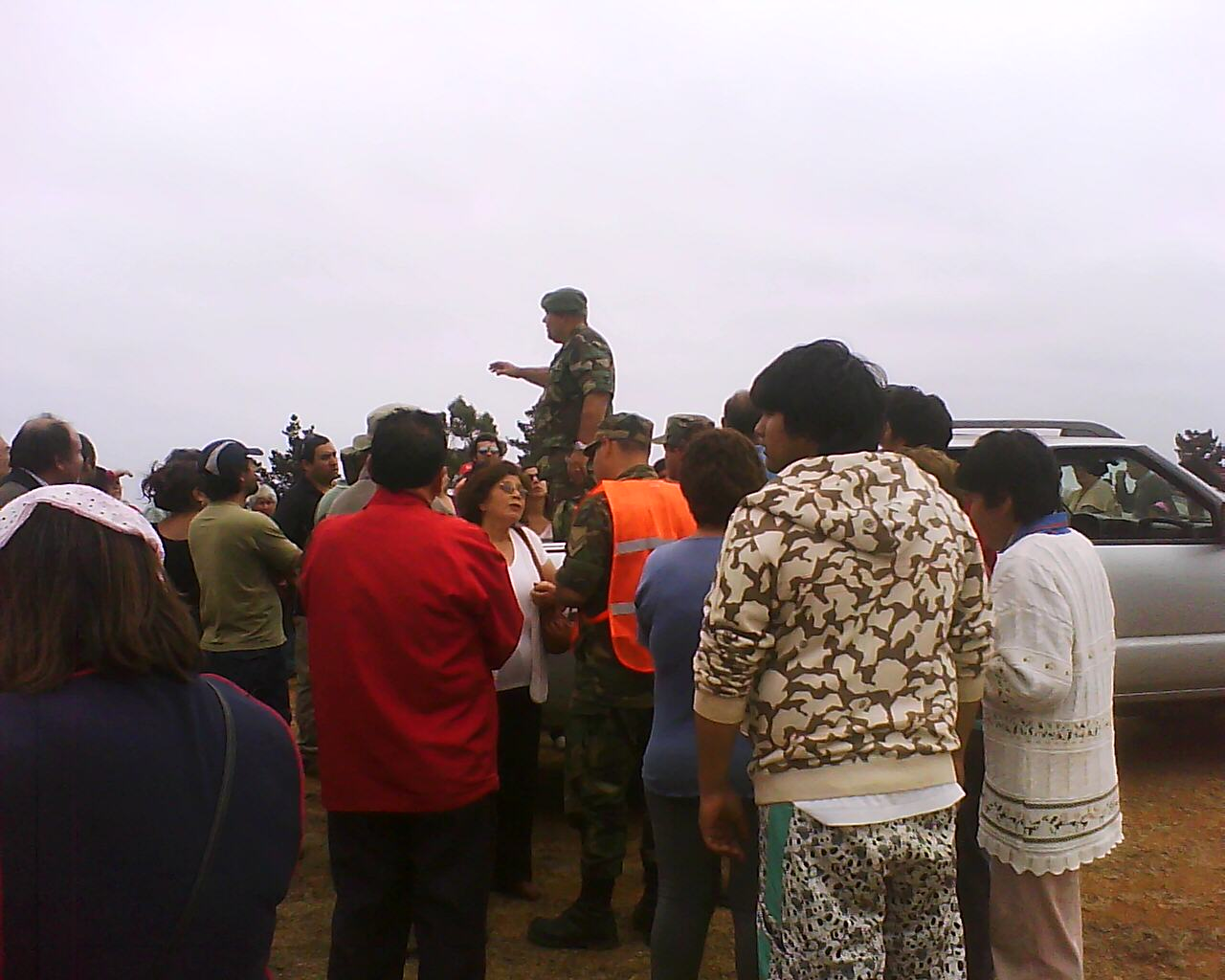
Army personnel at La Cruz Hill, Pichilemu, shortly after the earthquake occurred.

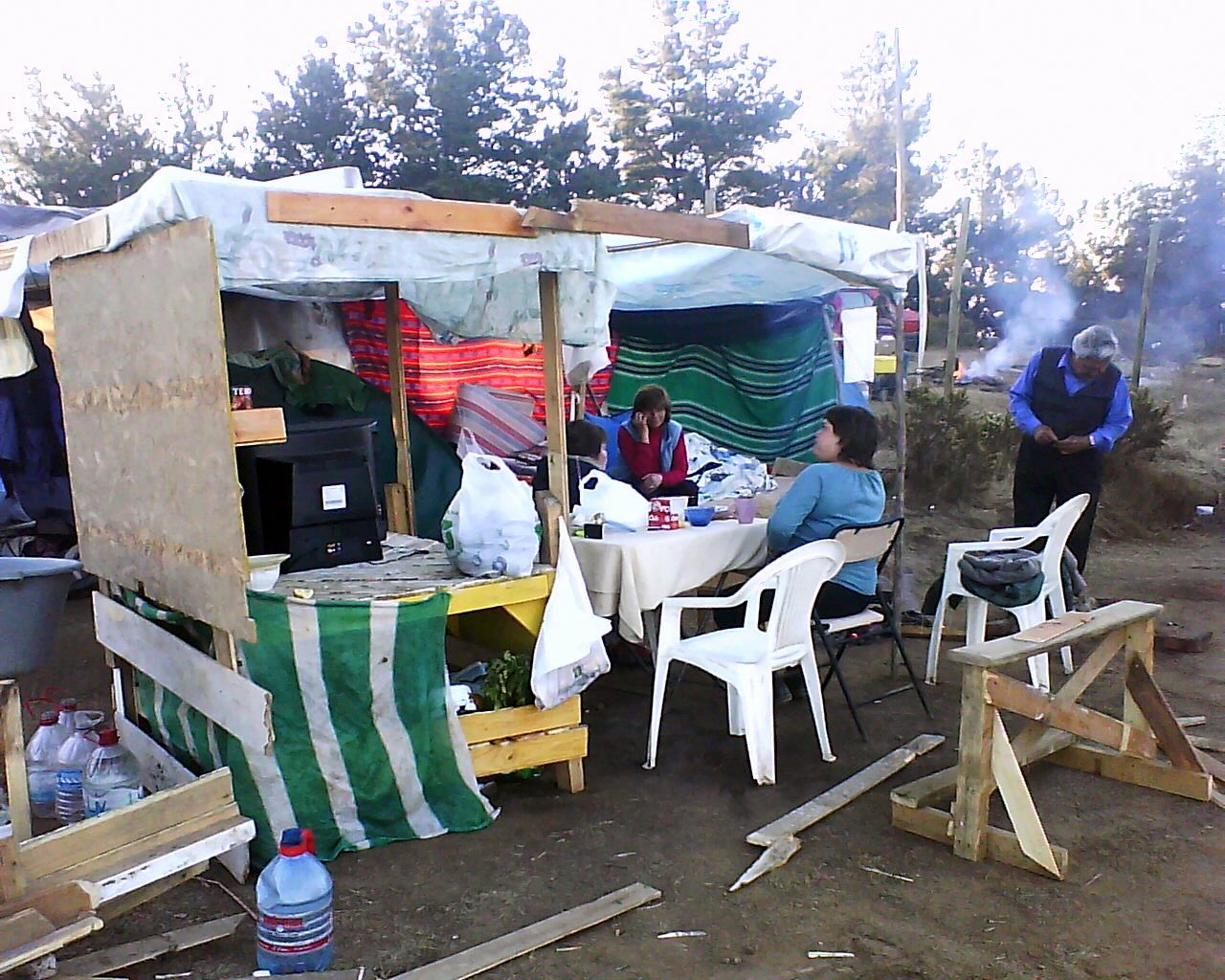
Locals set an improvised camp at the La Cruz Hill in Pichilemu, shortly after the tsunami warning was decreed

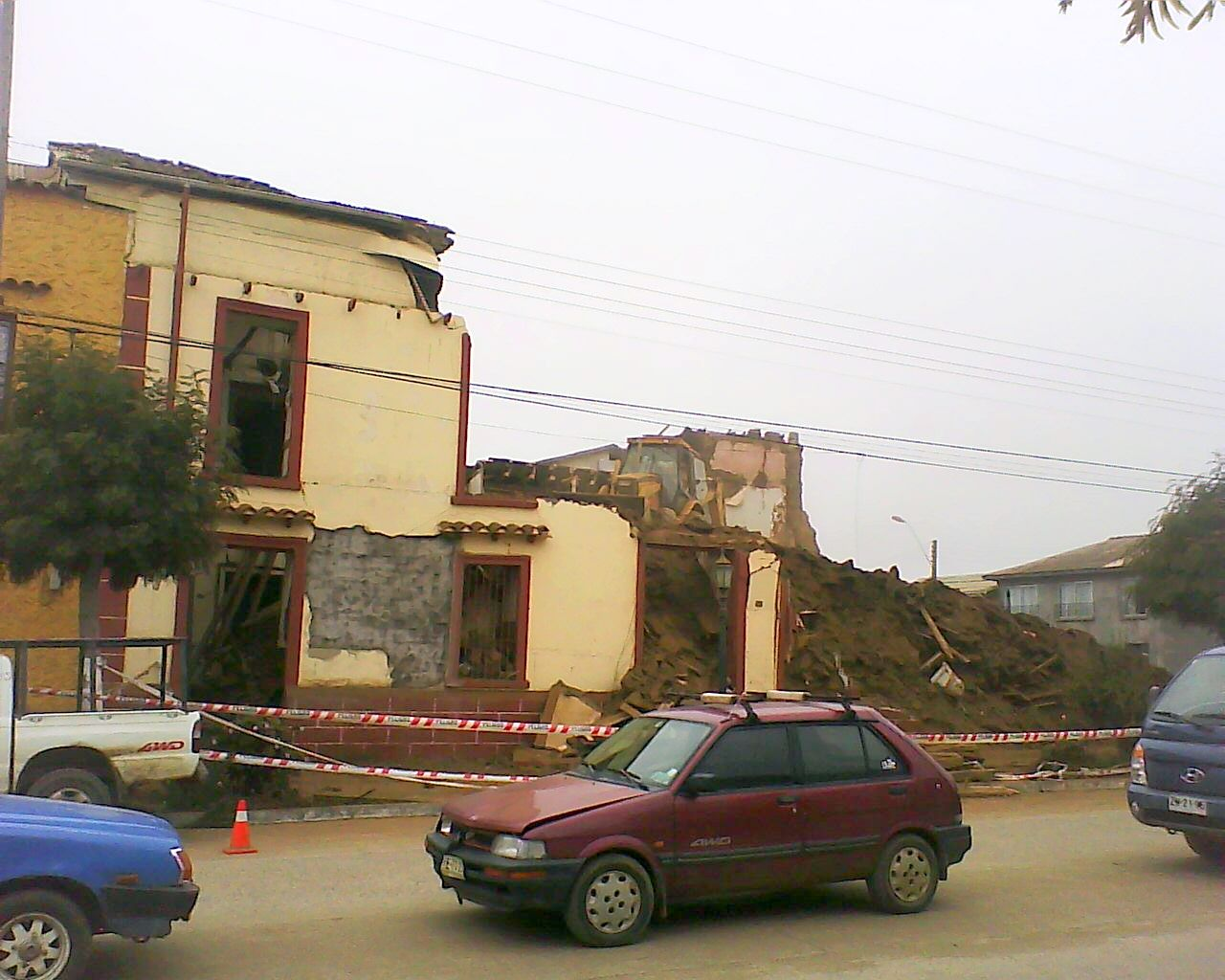
The Pichilemu post-office building was severely damaged by the February and March earthquakes.

At Pichilemu, the epicentre town, the earthquakes destroyed the balustres surrounding Agustín Ross Park, damaged severely the recently re-inaugurated Agustín Ross Cultural Centre, and the Espinillo, and Rodeillo villages. The earthquake was accompanied by "great noise", according to witnesses from the Pichilemu villages of Cardonal de Panilonco and La Aguada; most of the already damaged buildings in La Aguada fell down, including the local church. The road to Cardonal de Panilonco was damaged, and many houses built with adobe did not resist the shaking.

Outside Pichilemu, in Rancagua, local mayor Eduardo Soto reported severe damage to homes in the town. The Santa Julia highway overpass located between Rancagua and Graneros collapsed, and part of the Pan-American highway was damaged. A power outage affected Pichilemu for two days, beginning right after the earthquake struck, and there were partial power outages in Mostazal, San Fernando and Peumo. In Santiago, "windows rattled, buildings trembled and cellphone service failed", according to a New York Times article. The old Basílica del Salvador in Santiago, which was damaged during the 1985 Algarrobo earthquake and was never repaired, suffered additional damage. In Nilahue Barahona, a village near the town of Pumanque, electric cables fell to the ground during the earthquake, causing a fire that burned 65 hectares (160 acres) of a pine, eucalyptus and grassland forest. The earthquake was also reported to have been felt in Mendoza, Bariloche, Córdoba, San Rafael, Buenos Aires, Montevideo, and Asunción.

One person died of a heart attack during the earthquakes in Talca, Maule Region. A United States Geological Survey summary of the earthquakes reported damage at Rancagua, 177 kilometers northeast of Pichilemu. Relief efforts for the 27 February earthquake stalled for about six hours because of the constant aftershocks.

According to the U.S. National Oceanic and Atmospheric Administration's National Geophysical Data Center, the damage caused by the earthquakes and the accompanying small tsunami was "limited", adding that "a rough estimate of the dollar amount of damage" was "roughly corresponding to less than one million".

== Aftershocks ==
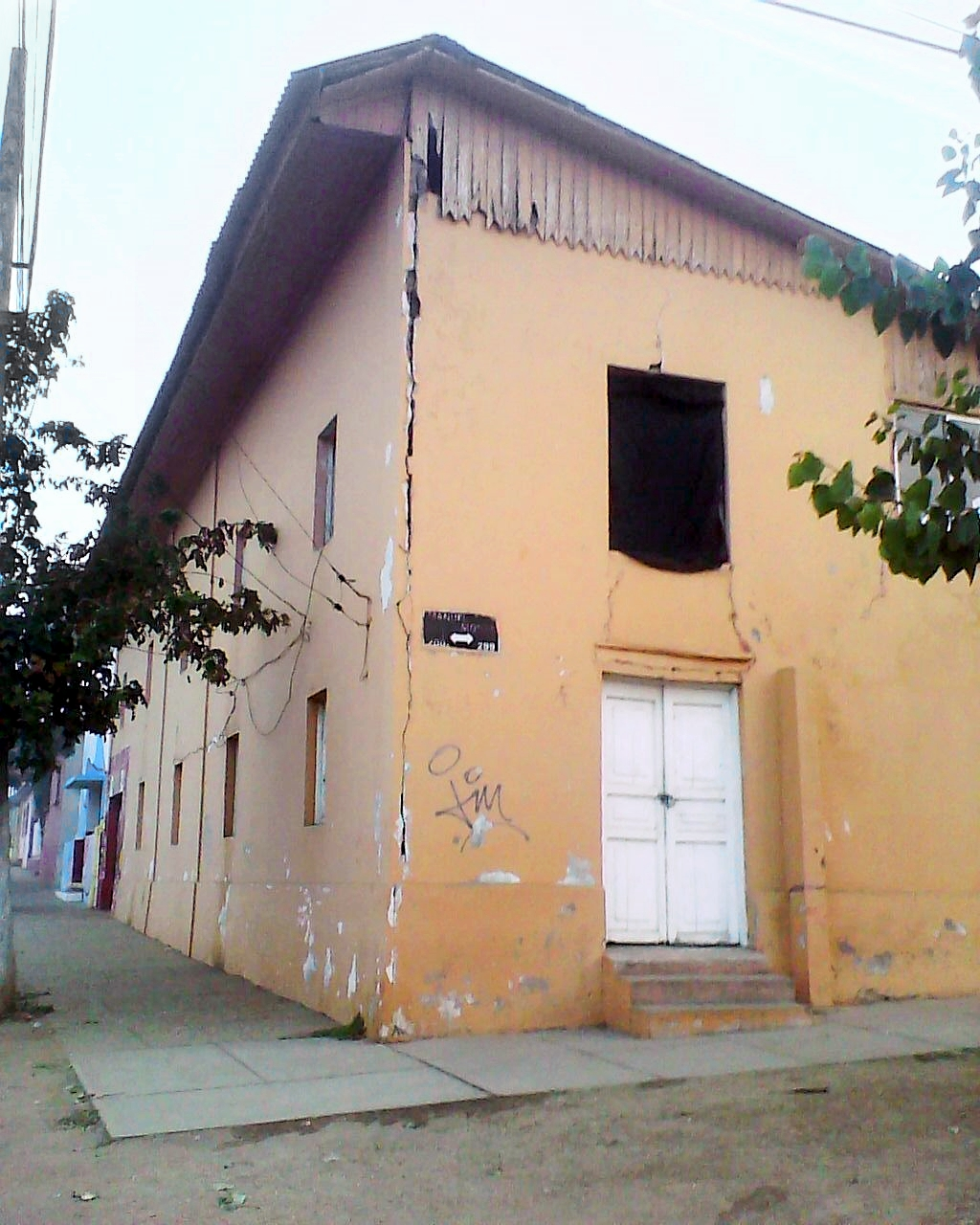
Several buildings in Pichilemu were damaged after the earthquake and its aftershocks.

Following the main shock, there were two aftershocks of magnitude 6 or greater. The first of them occurred at 11:55 local time, fifteen minutes after the initial quake, and was centered in the commune of La Estrella, Cardenal Caro Province, at a depth of 18.0 kilometres (11.2 mi), reaching a magnitude of 6.7; another aftershock, of magnitude 6.0, took place eleven minutes later, at 12:06 local time, this time centered in Pichilemu, at a depth of 29.3 kilometres (18.2 mi). In total, there were ten aftershocks within the six hours after the 6.9 magnitude earthquake, two of magnitude 6 or greater, and seven between 5 and 6.

Almost two months later, on 2 May 2010, an aftershock of magnitude 5.8 M_{W} struck the Chilean O'Higgins Region, at 10:52 local time. The aftershock was centered 44 kilometres (27 mi) southwest of Navidad, and occurred at a depth of 32.9 kilometres (20 mi), according to the University of Chile Seismological Service. The National Emergencies Office (ONEMI) reported that the aftershock was felt most strongly in Talca, 258 kilometres (160 mi) south of Santiago, and that there were no casualties, only some telephone lines had collapsed. Six other aftershocks subsequently hit the Pichilemu area that day. The United States Geological Survey measured the aftershock with a magnitude of 5.9.

A further aftershock of the Pichilemu earthquake occurred on 29 September 2010 at 12:29 local time. It reached magnitude 5.6, and its epicentre was centered 13 kilometres (8.1 mi) southwest of Lolol, 43 kilometres (27 mi) southwest of Santa Cruz, at a depth of 50 kilometres (31 mi). Telephone lines collapsed in O'Higgins Region. No infrastructural damage or casualties were reported. The aftershock was felt between the Valparaíso and Maule regions. The event reached Mercalli V intensity in Rancagua, Navidad, Talca, Curicó, amid other cities and towns.

As of February 2013, there have been about 8,500 aftershocks of the Chilean February and March 2010 earthquakes according to the University of Chile Seismological Service, with most taking place in the proximities of Pichilemu. Seismologist Sergio Ruiz said that "a significant number of aftershocks" will take place at least until 2015.

== Media coverage ==
The front page of El Mercurio on 12 March 2010 features the Pichilemu earthquakes and the swearing in of President Piñera

The earthquakes were reported by local, national and international news media. Locally, online newspaper Pichilemu News published an article named "First signs of change?: Shaken handover ceremony in Chile because of new earthquake aftershocks" ("¿Los primeros signos del cambio?: Movido cambio de mando se vivió en el país ante nuevas réplicas del terremoto") on 11 March; five days later, local newspaper El Expreso de la Costa published an interview with Mario Pardo, seismologist in charge of the geophysics department of the University of Chile, who recommended people of Pichilemu to "try to remain calm, the worst already happened". The only local radio that continued broadcasting through the day of the earthquakes was Radio Entre Olas, directed by Jorge Nasser Guerra, who along with two other radio workers, reportedly were the only ones not to be evacuated after the earthquakes in Pichilemu. Because the earthquakes provoked a power outage, the radio worked with "emergency equipment". Previously, after the 27 February earthquake, Entre Olas did not stop broadcasting either, despite there was a power outage that lasted for several days.

Nationally distributed newspaper El Mercurio published on its 12 March 2010 main page the headline "6.9 [magnitude] aftershock marks the most seismic day after the earthquake" ("Réplica de 6,9° marca el día más sísmico post terremoto"), adding that "[s]eventeen of the twenty seisms that occurred yesterday [11 March] in central-southern Chile had their epicentre in Pichilemu, Region of O'Higgins, which was declared in Disaster State yesterday." On that same day, Santiago-based newspaper La Tercera published on their headline: "Piñera faces first crisis as he takes office as new President" ("Piñera enfrenta primera crisis al asumir como nuevo Presidente"); La Tercera elaborated: "The 6.9 Richter magnitude earthquake, which occurred minutes before the power handover took place, added an additional quota of drama to the oath of Sebastián Piñera, whose agenda was already modified by the 27 February disaster." Other newspapers of national distribution where the earthquake was reported on its main page included Las Últimas Noticias (which featured a photograph of President Piñera aboarding a helicopter in military dress), Publimetro, and La Nación, whose main headline said "Emergency measures marked start of Piñera['s presidency]" ("Medidas de emergencia marcan partida de Piñera").

The New York Times included a headline on their 12 March 2010 main page titled "For Chile, More Aftershocks and An Inauguration", featuring a photograph of presidents Lugo and Correa during one of the earthquakes

Throughout Chile, regional newspapers also reported the earthquakes and tsunami warning on their edition of 12 March 2010. Among these are La Estrella de Arica (Arica), La Estrella de Iquique (Iquique), El Mercurio de Antofagasta, La Estrella del Norte (both from Antofagasta), El Mercurio de Calama, La Estrella del Loa (both from Calama), El Diario de Atacama, Diario Chañarcillo (both from Copiapó), El Día (La Serena), El Mercurio de Valparaíso, La Estrella de Valparaíso (both from Valparaíso), El Líder (San Antonio), El Tipógrafo (Rancagua), La Prensa (Curicó), El Sur (Concepción), El Austral de Temuco (Temuco), El Diario Austral de Los Ríos (Valdivia), El Austral de Osorno (Osorno), El Llanquihue (Puerto Montt), and La Prensa Austral (Punta Arenas).

Among the international media who reported on the earthquakes were the BBC, CNN, CBS News, The Huffington Post, and news agencies Al Jazeera, Reuters, and Associated Press. The New York Times included on their 12 March 2010 main page a photograph of Presidents Fernando Lugo of Paraguay and Rafael Correa of Ecuador "re-acting to an aftershock felt Thursday [11 March] in Valparaíso, Chile, the strongest since the devastating Feb. 27 earthquake"; the photograph was followed by the headline "For Chile, More Aftershocks, and an Inauguration". The newspaper published an extensive article titled "Aftershocks Jolt Chile as New President Is Sworn In", which stated that the earthquakes "almost overshadowed the inauguration of Chile’s first right-wing leader in 20 years [Piñera]." Other newspapers who included headlines on the earthquake on their 12 March 2010 main pages include El Mundo, El País, ABC (the three from Madrid, Spain), Clarín (Buenos Aires, Argentina), Bild (Berlin, Germany), El Colombiano (Medellín, Colombia), El Tiempo (Bogotá, Colombia), The Dallas Morning News (Dallas, Texas, United States of America), El Comercio (Lima, Peru), and Excélsior (Mexico City, Mexico).

== See also ==
- 1985 Rapel Lake earthquake
- List of earthquakes in 2010
- List of earthquakes in Chile
