= Pichilemu Fault =

- Falla de Pichilemu
- Location within Chile
- Etymology: Pichilemu
- Coordinates: 34°23′30″S 72°00′00″W
- Country: Chile
- Region: Libertador General Bernardo O'Higgins
- State: Cardenal Caro
- Cities: Pichilemu

Characteristics
- Length: 40 km (25 mi)
- Width: 20 km (12 mi)
- Depth: 15 km (9.3 mi)
- Strike: 010
- Dip: East

Tectonics
- Plate: South American
- Status: Active
- Earthquakes: 2010 Pichilemu (M_{w} 6.9 & 7.0)
- Type: Reverse
- Rock units: Pichilemu metamorphic complex, Neogene sediments
- Age: Late Paleozoic-recent
- Orogeny: Andean

The Pichilemu Fault (Spanish: Falla de Pichilemu), also referred to as the Pichilemu-Vichuquén Fault (Falla de Pichilemu-Vichuquén), is a Chilean geological fault, located in Libertador General Bernardo O'Higgins Region, some kilometers away from Pichilemu, at a depth of 15 kilometres (9.3 mi). The fault is 40 kilometres (25 mi) long and 20 kilometres (12 mi) wide.

== Activity ==
The fault became reactivated after the February 27, 2010, Chile earthquake, and gave rise to the 2010 Pichilemu earthquake on March 11. At first, it was not known if it was formed during the February earthquake, or if it was just reactivated; however, according to University of Chile geologist José Cembrano, "[it] corresponds to a long-live fault (in a million years time) whose activity had not been detected before." Ancient activity of the fault has been theorized to have occurred in the Late Paleozoic and Late Mesozoic. The reverse fault has a north-northeast to south-southwest strike and dips to the east.

"This is a new record that we have found, and it explains why Pichilemu is experiencing so many tremors," the director of the Seismological Service of the University of Chile, Sergio Barrientos told La Tercera on May 22, 2010. "It is not a crack nor an opening. It's a landslide," Barrientos added.

The Pichilemu Fault, along with the San Ramón Fault, was as of 2011 being studied by geologists of the University of Chile.
