= Capilla de las Hijas de la Caridad de San Vicente de Paul =

Church building in Chile

Coordinates: 34°34′33″S 70°59′31″W

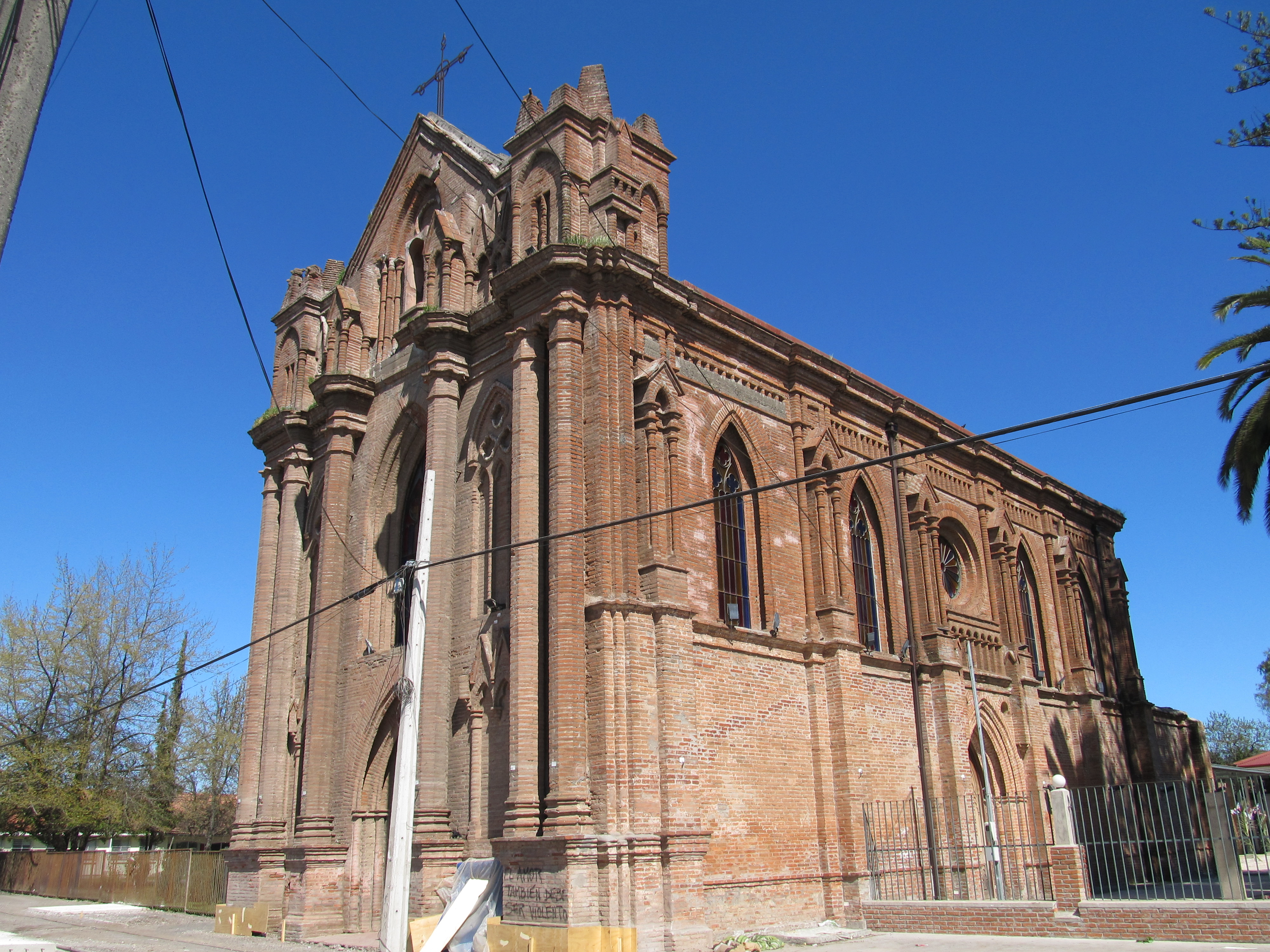

Religion
- Affiliation: Roman Catholic

Location
- Municipality: San Fernando
- Country: Chile
- Interactive map of Capilla de las Hijas de la Caridad de San Vicente de Paul

The Capilla de las Hijas de la Caridad de San Vicente de Paul is a Catholic church located in the city of San Fernando, O'Higgins Region, Chile. Completed in 1899, It was declared a National Monument of Chile in 1984, within the category of Historic Monuments.

== History ==
In 1872, eight sisters of the congregation of the Daughters of Charity of Saint Vincent de Paul arrived in San Fernando, to organize the San Juan de Dios Hospital and provide care to patients.

The construction of the chapel began in 1884 on the central patio of the hospital, funded in part by the Government of Chile, and by a donation made by Mercedes Gómez. The building was completed in 1899, and during the following year was added the altar.

In 1952 the hospital was demolished to be replaced by a new one, but the chapel survived. The 1985 Algarrobo earthquake caused structural damage to the chapel. A restoration work was completed in 2005.

== Description ==
Designed in the Gothic Revival style, it has a Latin Cross plan and is built of brick. The facade features exposed brick walls, while the interior walls are plastered. The ceiling and roof structure are made from wood.
