= La Cruz Hill (disambiguation) =

La Cruz Hill is located in Pichilemu, Chile; the tallest point of the city.

La Cruz Hill, or its Spanish translation Cerro La Cruz or Cerro de la Cruz (transliterated as Hill of the Cross) may also refer to:

- La Cruz Hill (Santiago de Chile), a hill in Santiago de Chile, Santiago Metropolitan Region, Chile;
- La Cruz Hill (Quintero), a hill in Quintero, Valparaíso Region, Chile;
- Cerro de la Cruz (Tepic), a hill in Tepic, Nayarit, Mexico;
- Cerro de la Cruz (Chontla), a hill in Chontla, Veracruz, Mexico;
- the Iberian village of Cerro de la Cruz, an archaeological site in Almedinilla, Córdoba Province, Spain.
- La Cruz Hill Protected Zone, a protected area in Costa Rica surrounding the eponymous hill.
