= Chilean ship Valdivia =

Pedro de Valdivia was the Conquistador of Chile, and the Capture of the City of Valdivia was one of the first victories of the Chilean Navy. Several ships of the Chilean Navy have been named Valdivia:

- Esmeralda (1791) renamed Valdivia after her capture by the Chilean Navy
- Valdivia (1865), ex-Henriette
- Valdivia (1903), built in Behrens Shipyard, Valdivia
- Valdivia (1927), a dredger built in Conrad Weft, Netherlands
- Valdivia (1943) ex-USS LCM-24958 of the US Navy
- Valdivia (1970), a Newport-class tank landing ship
