= 1985 Nahanni earthquakes =

Earthquakes in the Northwest Territories, Canada

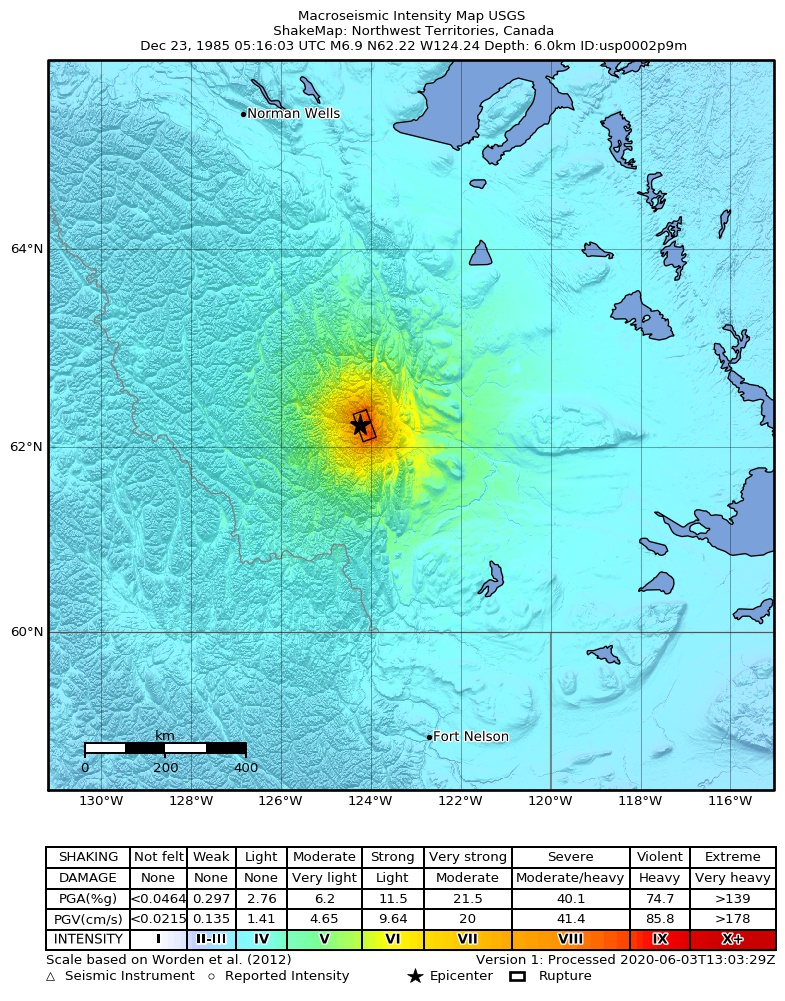

- Location within Northwest Territories Location within Canada
- UTC time: 1985-12-23 05:16:05
- ISC event: 509142
- USGS-ANSS: ComCat
- Local date: December 22, 1985
- Local time: 22:16:05
- Magnitude: 6.9 M_{w}
- Depth: 6.0 km (3.7 mi)
- Epicenter: 62.222°N 124.239°W
- Type: Thrust
- Areas affected: Canada
- Max. intensity: MMI VI (Strong)
- Peak acceleration: 2.37 g
- Peak velocity: 46.2 cm/s
- Landslides: Yes
- Aftershocks: Yes
- Casualties: None

The 1985 Nahanni earthquakes is the name for a continuous sequence of earthquakes that began in 1985 in the Nahanni region of the Northwest Territories, Canada. The largest of these earthquakes occurred on December 23, reaching 6.9 on the moment magnitude scale. This is one of the most significant earthquakes in Canada during the 20th century. The earthquakes had a long succession of aftershocks and jolts. The earthquakes amazed both the general public and the earth science community and have been felt in the Yukon, Alberta, Saskatchewan, British Columbia, and southeastern Alaska.

== Geology and impact ==
The earthquake sequence is commonly considered to consist of three major events over the span of almost three years: a M_{w}6.6 tremor on October 5, 1985, a M_{w}6.9 on December 23, 1985, and a M_{w}6.2 on March 25, 1988 UTC. All three events occurred within just several kilometers of each other.

The epicenters of the mainshocks and aftershocks lie approximately 44 km (28 mi) west of the Camsell Bend of the Mackenzie River in the foreland fold and thrust belt of the northeastern American Cordillera. This part of the Cordillera is dominated by horizontal crustal compression (shortening) in a northeast direction, forming a large amount of thrust faults and folds. This region is relatively sparse of intense seismic activity—the Nahanni earthquakes generated much interest among seismologists due to being the only recorded earthquakes >M6.0 in this area. Between October 5, 1985 and March 25, 1988, 323 aftershocks were recorded, occurring in a roughly 60 km by 20 km zone. The characteristics of aftershocks suggest that the rupture plane was a west-dipping low-angle thrust fault. The earthquakes are interpreted to have occurred on unmapped faults in the vicinity of the Iverson Thrust Fault.

The ground motion of the mainshock of December 23 was exceptionally intense, reaching a peak ground acceleration of more than 2 g and a peak ground velocity of over 40 cm/s. Due to the remote location of the epicenter, no structural damage was reported. The earthquake was felt 115 km (71 mi) away in Wrigley, where residents noted the effects of strong ground motion. A massive rockslide was triggered by the M_{w}6.6 event on October 5, around 7 km (4 mi) northeast of the epicenter. The rockslide displaced a volume of approximately 7.6 million cubic meters of earth in the Mackenzie Mountain foothills.

== See also ==
- List of earthquakes in 1985
- List of earthquakes in Canada
