= List of earthquakes in Chile occurring in 2010 =

Several earthquakes have occurred in Chilean territory in 2010:

- 2010 Chile earthquake (also called the Maule earthquake), the 8.8 magnitude earthquake on 27 February 2010 off the coast of Maule, which killed more than 500 people.
- 2010 first Pichilemu earthquake, the 6.9 magnitude earthquake on 11 March 2010 on the coast of Pichilemu
- 2010 first Biobío earthquake, the 6.7 magnitude earthquake on 15 March 2010 off the coast of Biobio
- 2010 third Biobío earthquake, the 6.2 magnitude on 23 April 2010 in Biobío
- 2010 second Pichilemu earthquake, the 6.0 magnitude on 2 May 2010 on the coast of Pichilemu
- 2010 second Biobío earthquake, the 5.9 magnitude earthquake on 2 April 2010 in Biobío
- 2010 Pichilemu earthquakes, the 5.9 magnitude earthquake that occurred on September 29, 2010, near Lolol.
