= 1985 Kayrakkum earthquake =

Earthquake in Tajikistan

- Location within Tajikistan
- UTC time: 1985-10-13 15:59:51
- ISC event: 513241
- USGS-ANSS: ComCat
- Local date: October 13, 1985
- Local time: 21:59:51
- Magnitude: 5.8 M_{w}
- Depth: 17.1 km (10.6 mi)
- Epicenter: 40.342°N 69.809°E
- Areas affected: Tajikistan
- Total damage: $US200 million
- Max. intensity: MMI IX (Violent)
- Casualties: 29 dead, >80 injured

The 1985 Kayrakkum earthquake (Russian: Кайраккумское землетрясение) struck Soviet Tajikistan on October 13 at about 22:00 local time. The earthquake measured M_{w} 5.8 and struck at a depth of 17.1 km (10.6 mi). At least 29 people died, over 80 were injured and another 8,000 were made homeless. Damage totaled $US200 million. Figures of the casualties were not disclosed until the following month.

== Tectonic setting ==
Central Asia is situated in a region of active convergence involving the Eurasian and Indian plates. While situated at a considerable distance from the collision front, the Pamirs and Tien Shan have risen significantly due to intraplate deformation brought by the collision. The earthquake occurred in the east–west trending Fergana Valley, situated between the Pamirs and Tian Shan. The valley is seismically active—four earthquakes have magnitudes exceeding 7.0 since 1900. These earthquakes display thrust-faulting mechanism. One of the strongest earthquakes in the valley occurred in 1946, measuring M_{w} 7.3.

== Earthquake ==
The mainshock had a focal mechanism corresponding to shallow reverse faulting with some strike-slip component.

== Impact ==
In Kairakkum, 90 percent of the city's multi-story brick buildings were destroyed—this earned the earthquake a maximum Modified Mercalli intensity (MMI) of IX (Violent). The Kayrakkum Reservoir embankments failed and were pushed into the water. The collapse of a carpet factory caused many casualties during the evening shift. Many workers were trapped under the rubble. The earthquake razed many industrial buildings, homes and cultural infrastructures, according to state media TASS. At nearby villages, adobe houses collapsed. Several landslides swept away roads.

South of Kayrakkum, at Ghafurov, a hospital was destroyed but its occupants had previously evacuated. Nearly 900 buildings were destroyed at Ghafurov corresponding to MMI VIII (Severe). MMI VII damage was reported at Leninabad. Telephone services were cut at Leninabad. The city's carpet and silk manufacturing districts were heavily damaged. About 10 mi (16 km) away from Leninabad, a hydroelectric dam was slightly damaged. A Soviet Communist Party official said that there was no conclusion to whether the damaged dam was at risk of collapsing or if there was a need to evacuate residents.

== Aftermath ==
TASS reported that it was the largest earthquake to strike the Soviet Union since 1976. Initial reports on October 15 stated that people had been killed and injured, but specific figures were not released. The National Earthquake Information Center in Colorado, United States described the earthquake as "moderate" in magnitude. Soviet leaders expressed their condolences to the victims. Local media reported that essential supplies were being distributed to the affected. Rescue workers at Leninabad attended to the ruins of the city's industrial area.

The Los Angeles Times said on November 7, Soviet newspaper Sotsialisticheskaya Industriya disclosed that the earthquake resulted in 29 fatalities and over 80 injuries. The figure was disclosed to stop "distortions and rumors" of the disaster. It is uncommon for Soviet media to release casualty numbers in disasters.

An Izvestia reporter said that damage caused by the earthquake was "unnessary". He added that authorities have long "resisted" classifying the Leninabad oblast an earthquake-prone region. Buildings in the area had been constructed in such practice that was not ideal for surviving earthquakes. The Leninabad area also does not have any seismic instruments to monitor seismic activity to assist in earthquake prediction. A recent evaluation of seismic hazards found that the area can experience stronger earthquakes than previously thought, yet no action was taken by authorities. Existing structures were not strengthened, and there were no updated safety codes for newly constructed buildings. These factors led to considerable destruction.

== See also ==
- List of earthquakes in 1985
- List of earthquakes in Tajikistan
