= USS San Bernardino (LST-1189) =

Newport-class tank landing ship

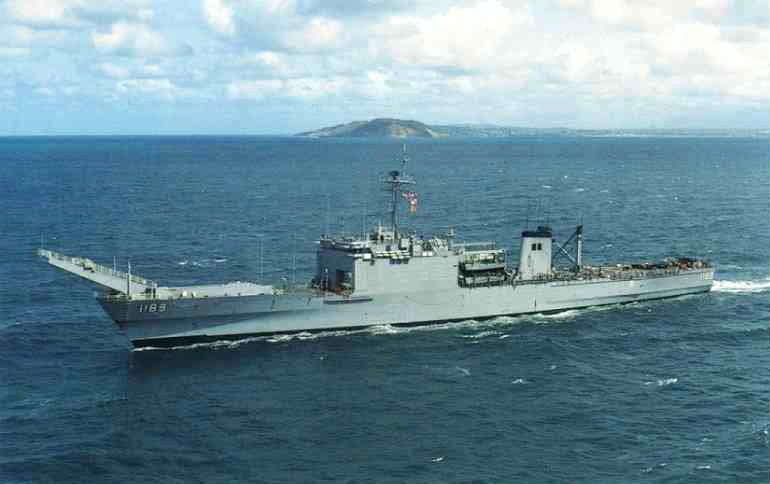
- USS San Bernardino (LST-1189) underway off San Diego, California

History

United States
- Name: USS San Bernardino
- Namesake: San Bernardino, California
- Builder: National Steel and Shipbuilding Company, San Diego, California
- Laid down: 12 July 1969
- Launched: 28 March 1970
- Commissioned: 27 March 1971
- Decommissioned: 30 September 1995
- Identification: LST-1189
- Fate: Transferred to Chile, 30 September 1995

Chile
- Name: Valdivia
- Acquired: 30 September 1995
- Commissioned: 30 September 1995
- Decommissioned: 14 January 2011
- Identification: LST-93
- Fate: Sold for scrap

General characteristics as built
- Class & type: Newport-class tank landing ship
- Displacement: 4,793 long tons (4,870 t) light; 8,342 long tons (8,476 t) full load
- Length: 522 ft 4 in (159.2 m) oa; 562 ft (171.3 m) over derrick arms
- Beam: 69 ft 6 in (21.2 m)
- Draft: 17 ft 6 in (5.3 m) max
- Propulsion: 2 shafts; 6 Alco diesel engines (3 per shaft); 16,500 shp (12,300 kW); Bow thruster
- Speed: 22 knots (41 km/h; 25 mph) max
- Range: 2,500 nmi (4,600 km; 2,900 mi) at 14 knots (26 km/h; 16 mph)
- Troops: 431 max
- Complement: 213
- Sensors & processing systems: 2 × Mk 63 GCFS; SPS-10 radar
- Armament: 2 × twin 3"/50 caliber guns
- Aviation facilities: Helicopter deck

USS San Bernardino (LST-1189) was the eleventh of twenty Newport-class tank landing ships of the United States Navy (USN) which replaced the traditional bow door-design tank landing ships (LSTs). The second USN ship to be named after the city in California, the ship was constructed by National Steel and Shipbuilding Company of San Diego, California. The LST was launched in 1970 and was commissioned in 1971. San Bernardino participated in the Vietnam War, earning one battle star and took part in operations in the Middle East. The ship was decommissioned 1995 and transferred to the Chilean Navy. In Chilean service, the vessel was renamed Valdivia (LST-93) for a battle during the Chilean War of Independence. The LST was recommissioned that year and during its service, took part in humanitarian efforts following earthquakes in Chile in 2010. In 2011 the Chilean Navy took Valdivia out of service due to repairs to the ship no longer being economical.

== Design and description ==
San Bernardino was a Newport-class tank landing ship which were designed to meet the goal put forward by the United States amphibious forces to have a tank landing ship (LST) capable of over 20 knots (37 km/h; 23 mph). However, the traditional bow door form for LSTs would not be capable. Therefore, the designers of the Newport class came up with a design of a traditional ship hull with a 112-foot (34 m) aluminum ramp slung over the bow supported by two derrick arms. The 34-long-ton (35 t) ramp was capable of sustaining loads up to 75 long tons (76 t). This made the Newport class the first to depart from the standard LST design that had been developed in early World War II.

The LST had a displacement of 4,793 long tons (4,870 t) when light and 8,342 long tons (8,476 t) at full load. San Bernardino was 522 feet 4 inches (159.2 m) long overall and 562 ft (171.3 m) over the derrick arms which protruded past the bow. The vessel had a beam of 69 ft 6 in (21.2 m), a draft forward of 11 ft 5 in (3.5 m) and 17 ft 5 in (5.3 m) at the stern at full load.

San Bernardino was fitted with six Alco 16-645-ES diesel engines turning two shafts, three to each shaft. The system was rated at 16,500 brake horsepower (12,300 kW) and gave the ship a maximum speed of 22 knots (41 km/h; 25 mph) for short periods and could only sustain 20 knots (37 km/h; 23 mph) for an extended length of time. The LST carried 1,750 long tons (1,780 t) of diesel fuel for a range of 2,500 nautical miles (4,600 km; 2,900 mi) at the cruising speed of 14 knots (26 km/h; 16 mph). The ship was also equipped with a bow thruster to allow for better maneuvering near causeways and to hold position while offshore during the unloading of amphibious vehicles.

The Newport class were larger and faster than previous LSTs and were able to transport tanks, heavy vehicles and engineer groups and supplies that were too large for helicopters or smaller landing craft to carry. The LSTs have a ramp forward of the superstructure that connects the lower tank deck with the main deck and a passage large enough to allow access to the parking area amidships. The vessels are also equipped with a stern gate to allow the unloading of amphibious vehicles directly into the water or to unload onto a utility landing craft (LCU) or pier. At either end of the tank deck there is a 30 ft (9.1 m) turntable that permits vehicles to turn around without having to reverse. The Newport class has the capacity for 500 long tons (510 t) of vehicles, 19,000 ft^{2} (1,800 m^{2}) of cargo area and could carry up to 431 troops. The vessels also have davits for four vehicle and personnel landing craft (LCVPs) and could carry four pontoon causeway sections along the sides of the hull.

San Bernardino was initially armed with four Mark 33 3-inch (76 mm)/50 caliber guns in two twin turrets. The vessel was equipped with two Mk 63 gun control fire systems (GCFS) for the 3-inch guns, but these were removed in 1977–1978. The ship also had SPS-10 surface search radar. Atop the stern gate, the vessels mounted a helicopter deck. They had a maximum complement of 213 including 11 officers.

== Construction and career ==
=== United States Navy service ===
The LST was ordered as the second hull of the third group in Fiscal Year 1967 and a contract was awarded on 15 July 1966. The ship's keel was laid down on 12 July 1969 by National Steel and Shipbuilding Company at their yard in San Diego, California. Named for a city in California, San Bernardino was launched on 28 March 1970, sponsored by the wife of Vice Admiral Walter H. Baumberger. The vessel was commissioned at the Long Beach Naval Shipyard on 27 March 1971 and assigned to Amphibious Squadron 3, Amphibious Force, Pacific Fleet and home ported in San Diego.

For the remainder of 1971, San Bernardino operated along the coast of California, conducting routine operations. In 1972 San Bernardino opened 1972 by escorting four Indonesian vessels from the United States to Pearl Harbor, Hawaii. The LST returned to San Diego, via Acapulco, Mexico on 9 February. From April until June, the ship trained off the Californian coast and in the Hawaiian Islands. On 7 June San Bernardino departed on a voyage to South America. The tank landing ship visited Valparaíso, Chile; Callao, Peru; and Rodman Naval Station, Panama, before returning to San Diego on 17 July. San Bernardino spent the next two months performing routine operations before being deployed to the western Pacific as part of the 7th Fleet. San Bernardino departed San Diego on 21 September and arrived in Subic Bay on 19 October. From there, the LST participated in ZAMEX 9–72 on 23–24 October and joined the Amphibious Ready Group (ARG) in the Gulf of Tonkin on 28 October, remaining with the unit until 14 November. The ARG was stationed off Da Nang, South Vietnam, in a constant state or readiness to respond to threats to Americans in the region. San Bernardino then sailed for Keelung, Taiwan and Subic Bay, rejoining the ARG in the Gulf of Tonkin on 15 December. On 17 December the ship was detached to assist USS Asheville and USS Tacoma to Subic Bay. The three ships arrived on 19 December after which San Bernardino was bound for Hong Kong for a short stay and returned to Subic Bay on 29 December and remained in port for the rest of the year. San Bernardino's deployment to the 7th Fleet continued until mid-April 1973. The ship returned to San Diego on 29 April. San Bernardino earned one battle star for service in the Vietnam War. San Bernardino continued routine operations along the Californian coast until mid June, remaining in port for five months. In early June, the LST was deployed to the western Pacific again, with stops at Pearl Harbor, Suva, Fiji, and Brisbane, Australia.

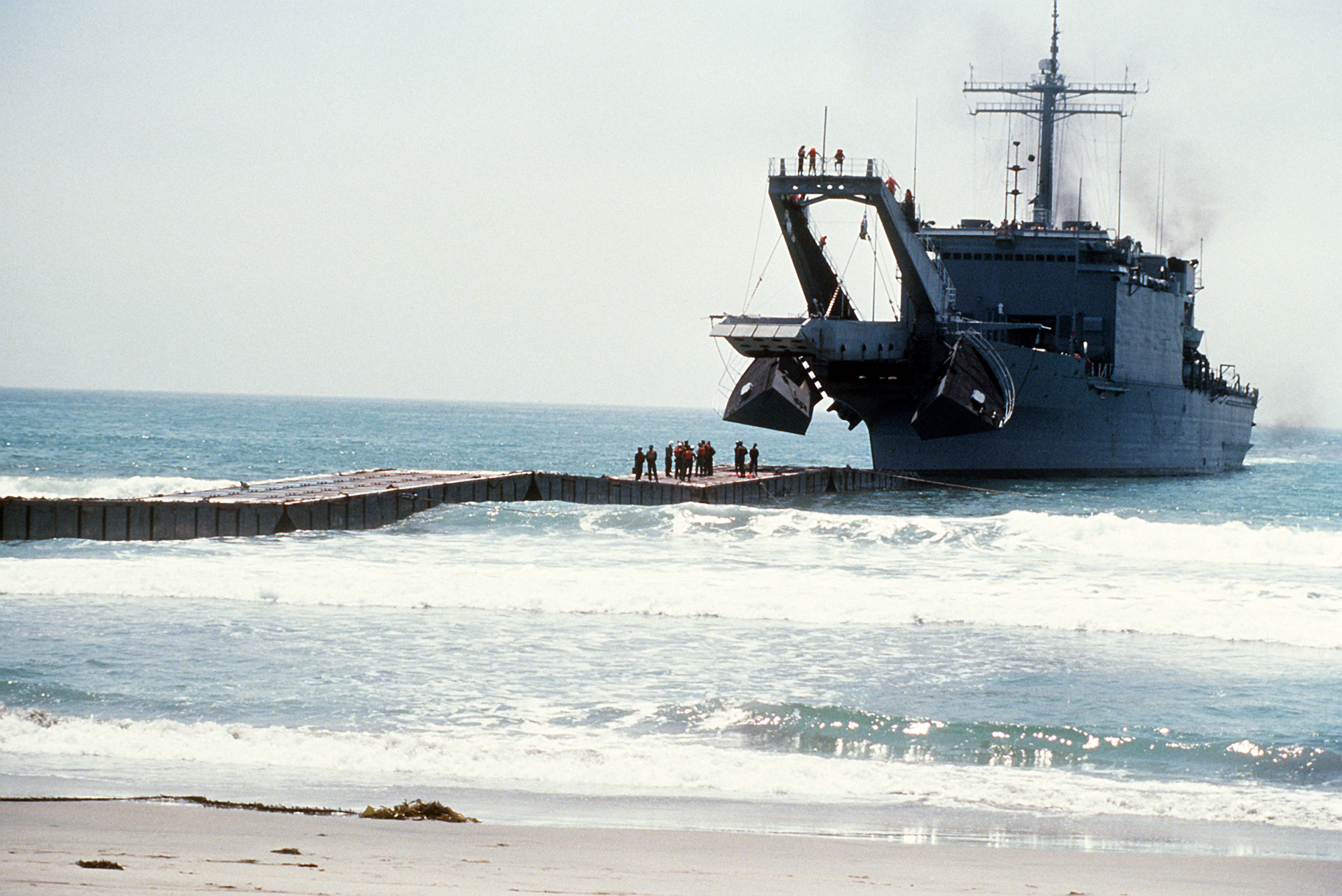
USS San Bernardino during a landing exercise in 1979.

In 1990 San Bernardino was deployed to the Persian Gulf as part of Amphibious Ready Group Bravo (ARG Bravo) during the Gulf War. ARG Bravo was based at Okinawa, Japan. ARG Bravo was to deploy the Regimental Landing Team 4 headquarters and a combat service support detachment in an amphibious landing. However, this did not happen and after arrival in the operations area, the landing team were deployed as a rear area security force. The ships of ARG Bravo were instead used as sea-based mobile logistics platforms until their departure in November 1991. (Note: The ships of Amphibious Ready Group Bravo were USS Dubuque, USS Schenectady and San Bernardino.) The ship was decommissioned on 30 September 1995 from the United States Navy.

=== Chilean Navy service ===
The ship was transferred to the Chilean Navy as part of the Security Assistance Program on 30 September at San Diego. (Note: The Naval Vessel Register states it was a cash sale while Saunders says it was a lease.) The LST was renamed Valdivia (LST-93) for a battle during the Chilean War of Independence. The ship arrived at its new Chilean homeport, Valparaíso, on 1 December 1995. In Chilean service, the LST operated with the Amphibious and Naval Transport Command (Spanish: Comando Anfibio y de Transportes Navales), performing operations from Arica to Puerto Williams. In mid-1997, Valdivia was damaged after going aground but repaired. During 2010, Valdivia was heavily involved in relief efforts following the series of earthquakes affecting Chile throughout 2010. The intense workload caused structural and component fatigue to the already old vessel, and an inspection in August 2010 concluded that repairing the ship would be uneconomical. Valdivia was decommissioned on 14 January 2011. The Chilean Navy planned to replace the LST with two landing platform dock type vessels. This ship was sold for scrap in Sierra Leone.

== See also ==
- USS San Bernardino County (LST-1110)
- List of United States Navy LSTs
