= El Arrayán Fault =

El Arrayán Fault (Spanish: Falla El Arrayán) is a geological fault, located inmediataly north of the city of Santiago in Chile. The fault runs in northwest-southeast direction. Likely, the fault was last active sometime in the Quaternary period (last 2.5 million years). It is chiefly a strike-slip fault. Fault scarps, sag ponds, mountain saddles and stream deflection are some of the surface features of El Arrayán Fault. The fault is estimated to be able to produce 6.4 Mw-strong earthquakes which make it a significant risk factor for the northernmost neighbourhoods of Santiago.
