= Gafurov =

Gafurov or Ghafurov (Russian: Гафуров) is a masculine surname common in Uzbekistan, Tajikistan and nearby countries. Its feminine counterpart is Gafurova or Ghafurova. It may refer to

- Anvar Gafurov (born 1982), Uzbekistani football player
- Bobojon Ghafurov (1908–1977), Tajik historian
- Husniddin Gafurov (born 1994), Uzbekistani football player
- Marat Gafurov (born 1984), Russian professional mixed martial artist
- Rashidjon Gafurov (born 1977), Uzbekistani football midfielder
- Renat Gafurov (born 1982), Russian motorcycle speedway rider
- Said Gafurov (born 1967), Russian economist, orientalist and administrator Гафуров Михаил Андреевич 20.05.1999 МС по ММА в легком весе

== See also ==
- Ghafurov
