= El Llanquihue =

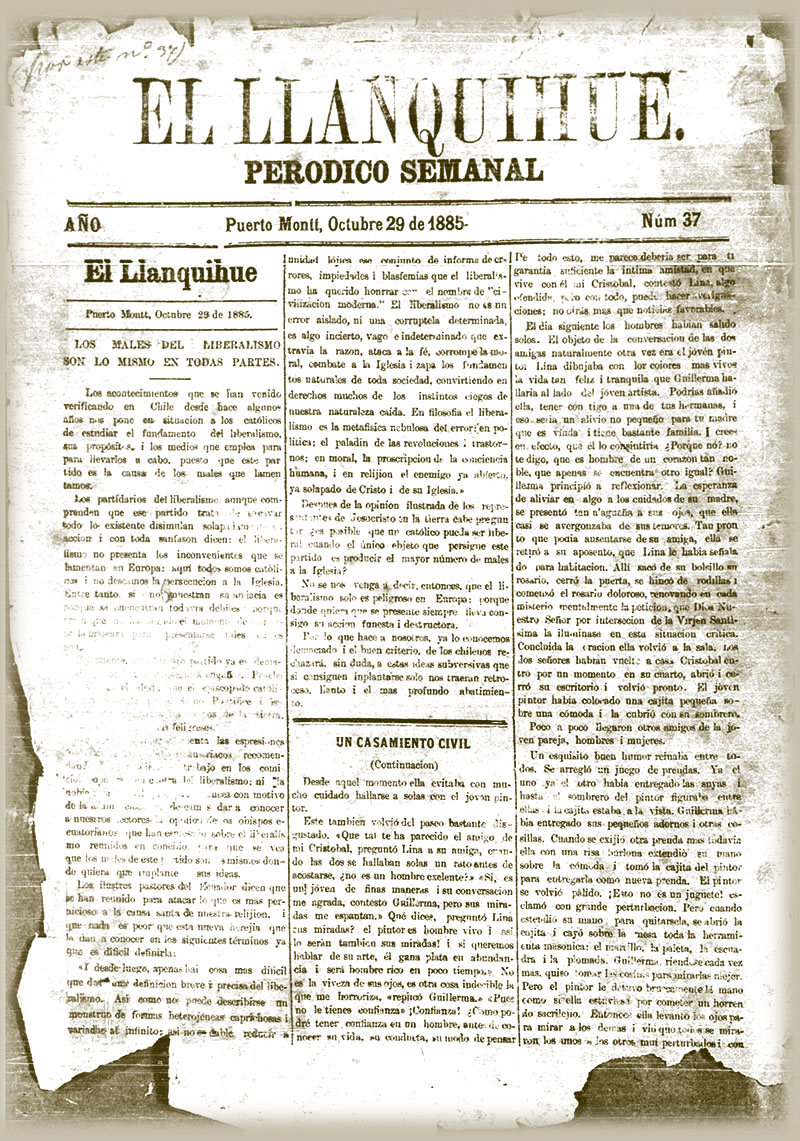
- Front page of El Llanquihue's 29 October 1885 edition. Front page of El Llanquihue's 29 October 1885 edition.
- Type: Daily newspaper
- Format: Berliner
- Owner(s): El Mercurio group via Sociedad Periodística Araucanía S.A.
- Founded: February 12, 1885
- Political alignment: Conservative
- Headquarters: Puerto Montt
- Website: El Llanquihue

El Llanquihue is a Chilean daily newspaper published in the city of Puerto Montt. The newspaper was founded in 1885 being the fourth oldest Chilean newspaper in continuous publication.
