= Berhida =

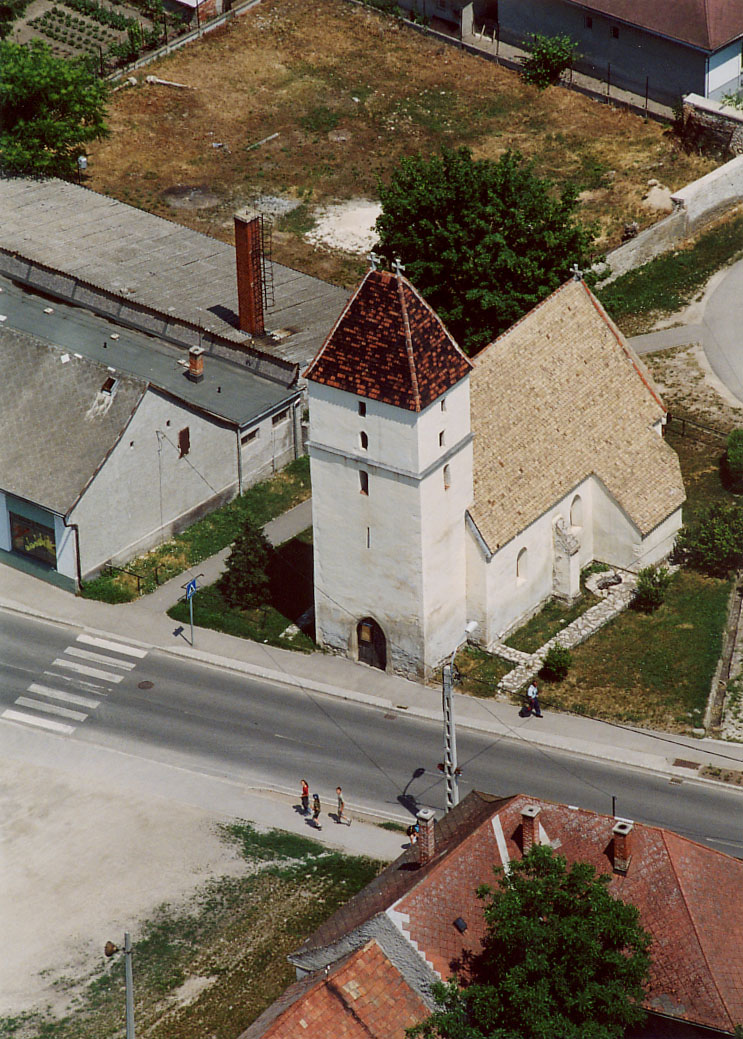
- Aerial photography of Berhida church

- Flag Coat of arms

- Location of Berhida
- Coordinates: 47.11324°N 18.13433°E
- Country: Hungary
- County: Veszprém

Area
  - Total: 42.66 km^{2} (16.47 sq mi)

Population (2015)
  - Total: 5,833
  - Density: 136.7/km^{2} (354.1/sq mi)
- Time zone: UTC+1 (CET)
  - Summer (DST): UTC+2 (CEST)
- Postal code: 8181
- Area code: 88

Berhida is a town in Veszprém county, Hungary.
