= 1985 Rapel Lake earthquake =

Earthquake in Chile

- Location within South America
- UTC time: 1985-04-09 01:56:59
- ISC event: 527122
- USGS-ANSS: ComCat
- Local date: 8 April 1985
- Local time: 21:56:59 UTC-4
- Magnitude: 7.2 M_{w} 7.5 M_{s}
- Depth: 37.8 km (23 mi)
- Epicenter: 34.12°S 71.51°W
- Areas affected: Chile, Argentina
- Max. intensity: MMI VI (Strong)
- Tsunami: No
- Casualties: 2 killed

The 1985 Rapel Lake earthquake occurred on 8 April at 21:56:59 local time with a moment magnitude of 7.2 and a maximum perceived intensity of VI (Strong). The shock was centered 75 kilometres (47 mi) southwest of Santiago, Chile, with a focal depth of 37.8 km (23 mi).

== Earthquake ==
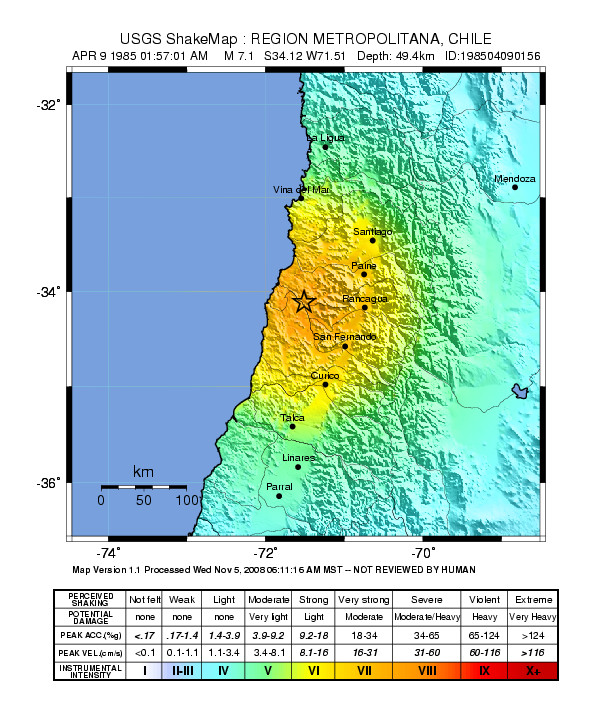
USGS ShakeMap of the 1985 mainshock

The 9 April 1985 earthquake occurred in the same fault area as the 2010 Pichilemu earthquakes, and is considered by University of Chile Seismological Service a thrust fault-type interplate earthquake.

The earthquake, measured in the Modified Mercalli intensity, reached magnitude VI in Curacaví, La Calera, Los Andes, Peñaflor, San Antonio, Valparaíso, and Viña del Mar; and magnitude V–VI in Concón, Constitución, Curicó, La Ligua, Melipilla, Papudo, Pichilemu, Puchuncaví, Quilpué, and Villa Alemana. The earthquake was felt throughout much of central Chile from La Serena to Osorno. It was also felt in Mendoza, San Juan, San Luis, Córdoba, Tucumán, and Santa Fe provinces in Argentina. According to national radio networks, the tremors "were felt along a 1,000-mile stretch of Chile from Copiapó in the north to Valdivia in the south and across the Andes mountains in Argentina".

Although it has been considered by the news media as an aftershock of the 3 March 1985 earthquake, according to Rosa Urrutia de Hazbún and Carlos Lanza Lazcano's book Catástrofes en Chile 1541–1992, this earthquake was a different and separate event.

Mario Pardo, the director of the Chilean Seismological Service, told international press in April 1985 that it was "apparently an aftershock from the 3 March earthquake that killed 177 in central Chile" and that "the quake was centered in the ocean off the coast near Pichilemu, a city 100 miles southwest of Santiago".

According to national radio networks, the tremors "were felt along a 1,000-mile stretch of Chile from Copiapó in the north to Valdivia in the south and across the Andes Mountaines in Argentina".

=== Damage and effects ===
Two people died of heart attacks after the earthquake; one in Santiago and another in Chillán. The earthquake lasted approximately three minutes according to The New York Times.

It created damage in addition to that already caused by 3 March earthquake in the Santiago-Valparaíso area.

Hundreds of people panicked into the streets, while radio stations reported some brief power blackouts. In Valparaíso, the roof of a house collapsed, while other houses fell down in Curacaví. No injuries were reported.

=== Previous events ===
A magnitude 8.0 earthquake was registered on 3 March 1985 offshore Valparaíso, Valparaíso Region. It reached a maximum intensity of IX on the Mercalli intensity scale. 177 people were killed, 2,575 injured, 142,489 houses were damaged and about a million people were left homeless. There was a long interruption on basic services, and the damage provoked by that earthquake was estimated to be more than 1,046 million US dollars.

== See also ==
- List of earthquakes in Chile
