= 1985 Luquan earthquake =

April 1985 earthquake in Yunnan, China

- Location within China
- UTC time: 1985-04-18 05:52:55
- ISC event: 527818
- USGS-ANSS: ComCat
- Local date: 18 April 1985
- Local time: 13:52:55
- Magnitude: M_{s} 6.3
- Depth: 5 km (3.1 mi)
- Epicenter: 25.926°N 102.871°E
- Areas affected: China
- Casualties: 22 killed, more than 300 injured

The 1985 Luquan earthquake occurred on April 18, 1985, at 13:52 local time (05:52 UTC). The epicenter was near Luquan County, Yunnan, China. Research showed that the source of this earthquake was Zeyi Fault (则邑断层). Twenty-two people were killed and more than 300 injured in this earthquake.

== See also ==
- List of earthquakes in China
- List of earthquakes in Yunnan
