= La Aguada, Pichilemu =

Coordinates: 34.247°S 71.708°W

La Aguada
- Village
- La Aguada
- Interactive map of La Aguada
- Country: Chile
- Region: (O'Higgins Region) O'Higgins
- Province: (Cardenal Caro Province) Cardenal Caro
- Commune: Pichilemu

La Aguada (Spanish for the well, pronounced [la aˈwaða] or [la 'waða]) is a Chilean village located north of Pichilemu, Cardenal Caro Province.
