= 1985 Algarrobo earthquake =

Severe earthquake centered in Valparaíso Region, Chile

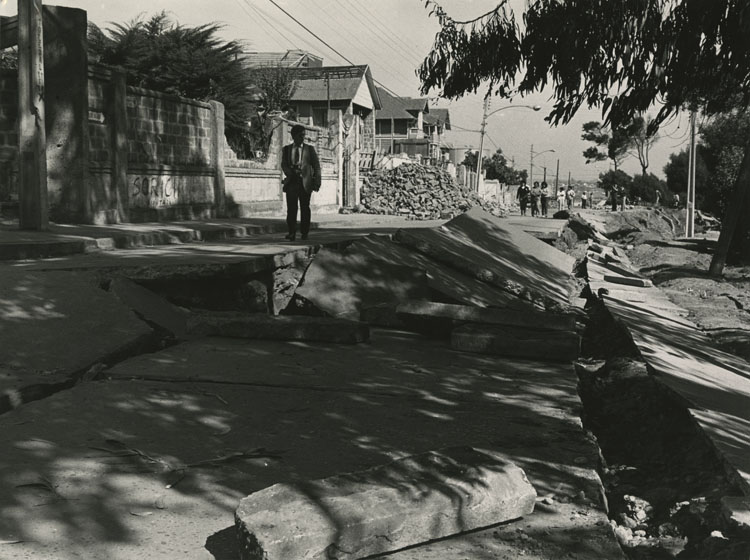

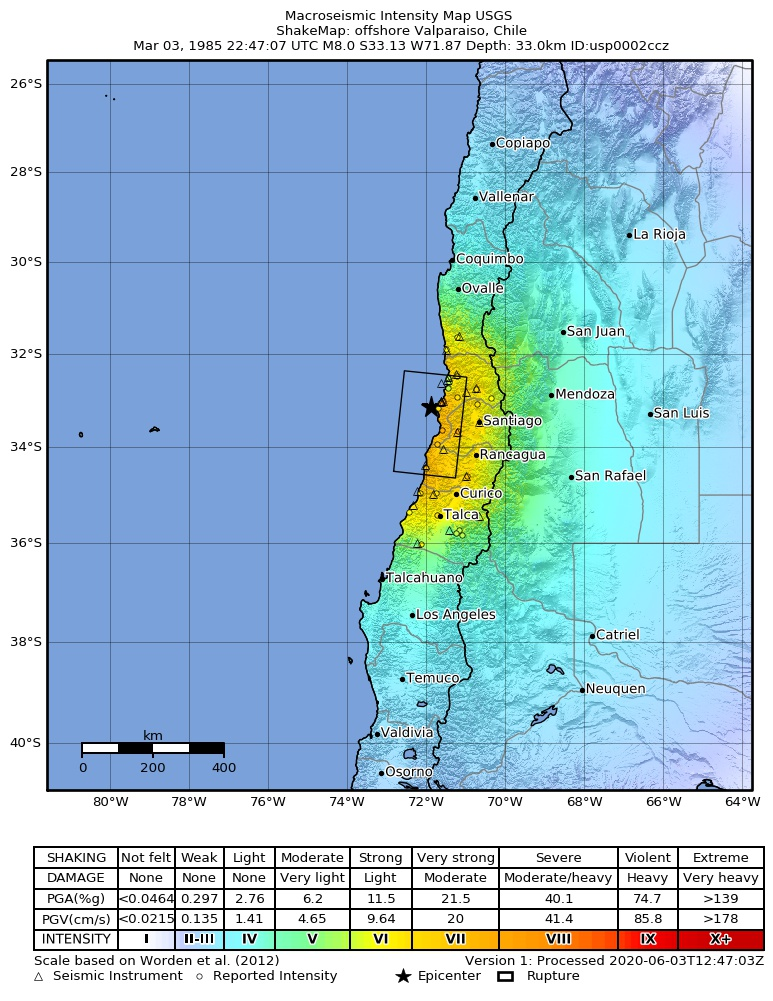
- USGS ShakeMap

- Location within South America
- UTC time: 1985-03-03 22:47
- ISC event: 529084
- USGS-ANSS: ComCat
- Local date: 3 March 1985
- Local time: 19:47 UTC−03:00
- Duration: 69 seconds
- Magnitude: 8.0 M_{w}
- Depth: 35.0 km (21.7 mi)
- Epicenter: 33.257°S 71.858°W
- Fault: Atacama Trench
- Type: Megathrust
- Areas affected: Central Chile
- Total damage: $1.5–1.8 billion
- Max. intensity: MMI IX (Violent) (Llolleo)
- Peak acceleration: .86 g (Llolleo)
- Tsunami: Yes
- Landslides: Yes
- Casualties: 177–200 dead 2,483–2,575 injured 372,532–500,000 homeless (Note: For the number of people made homeless, seismologist Bruce Bolt provides the minimum figure of 372,532, and EM-DAT (in the PAGER-CAT data set) provides the maximum figure of 500,000)

A megathrust earthquake measuring 8.0 M_{w} struck just offshore the Greater Valparaíso area of Central Chile on 3 March 1985. The event followed a ten-day period of moderate and non-destructive foreshocks and left at least 177 people dead and about 2,500 injured. According to several reports, a small sector of damage in Llolleo corresponded to a maximum Mercalli intensity of IX (Violent), though the vast majority of damage was considered to align with intensity VIII (Severe) effects or less. The damage was significant and widespread, and was similar to numerous previous events that had severely impacted the Valparaíso and Santiago metropolitan areas. Great earthquakes related to the subduction zone have occurred directly under populated areas or very close offshore since records began with the arrival of Europeans in the sixteenth century.

Because of its heavy impact (financial losses of $1.5–1.8 billion) in the Valparaíso, Santiago, O'Higgins, and Maule Regions, the event has been thoroughly studied across various disciplines. Numerous scientific and academic papers published beginning in the late 20th-century and continuing into the 21st-century have explored its features, including the geological, seismological, and epidemiological aspects of the event, and have improved the understanding of the complex plate boundary and how this specific event relates to the many that came before it. Most have been primarily of the megathrust type, but Central Chile is also subject to other types of earthquakes that are related to the relatively deep subduction zone as well as shallow and onshore crustal faults.

A significant aftershock sequence followed that included many large (M6+) and very large (M7+) shocks. Only a small portion of these had destructive characteristics, including the twin 6.7 M_{w} shocks on 17 and 19 March and the 7.2 M_{w} Rapel Lake earthquake on 9 April. Multiple international scientific groups convened in the area to assist local universities with seismological, engineering, and geological surveys, including the study of a moderately-destructive and basin-wide tsunami that caused several million dollars' worth of damage along the Central Chilean coast.

== History ==
Central Chile (roughly between 32° and 35° south latitude) has been repeatedly affected by great earthquakes. Since the arrival of Europeans in the sixteenth-century, onshore and offshore events have been documented in this region from the coastal cities of Valparaíso in the north and Concepción in the south. The majority of these events have been of the megathrust/interplate type; a limited number of them have been identified as normal/intraplate. It was one of these normal (dip-slip) events that was Chile's deadliest; the 1939 Chillán event resulted in 28,000–30,000 deaths (without the influence of a tsunami). The inland city of Santiago was heavily damaged in the 1730, 1822, and 1906 megathrust events. With a recurrence interval of a little more than 80 years, the 1985 event was not unexpected.

== Tectonic setting ==
The Peru–Chile Trench, also known as the Atacama Trench, is the primary tectonic feature off the west coast of South America and has contributed to Chile being one of the most seismically active countries in the world. The Nazca plate is subducting to the east under the South American plate, with high-speed convergence (Note: The rate of convergence varies along the trench and sources also present different figures. For example, Yeats 2012, p. 190 gives a rate of 84 mm (3.3 in) in Central Chile and 60 mm (2.4 in) per year in Colombia. Hayes et al. 2015 presents similar figures of 80 mm (3.1 in) in the south and 65 mm (2.6 in) in the north. Plafker 1985, p. 14 and Mendoza, Hartzell & Monfret 1994, p. 281 give Central Chilean slip rates of 92 mm (3.6 in) and 90 mm (3.5 in) respectively and finally, Wood, Wight & Moehle 1987, pp. 6, 7 gives a full 100 mm (3.9 in) per year for Chile and Peru.) and sustained stick-slip action resulting in two types of earthquakes along the trench. There are the typical interplate events that occur at the subduction interface and the less common intraplate events that occur within the downgoing Nazca slab. An additional earthquake hazard comes in the form of shallow crustal faults. The San Ramón Fault, for example, is a thrust fault that is positioned along the easternmost districts of Santiago. Despite estimated slip rates of .5 millimeters (0.020 in) per year, paleoseismologists have uncovered evidence of several very large events (5 meters (16 ft) of slip). They acknowledged that a more typical event on this fault may only produce a large shock in the range of 6.2–6.7 as the fault is segmented.

== Foreshocks ==
Foreshock activity occurred for eleven days prior to the mainshock, beginning on 21 February with a 5.7 M_{w} event. This magnitude was supplied by the National Earthquake Hazards Reduction Program (NHRP)/National Earthquake Information Center (NEIC) and a 2017 United States Geological Survey (USGS) study and data release. The NHRP/NEIC placed the intensity of this initial foreshock at VI (Strong). Over the course of the eleven days, 360 events over 3.0 M_{c} occurred, but none with a higher intensity than the initial event. This included more than 50 events on 21 February and more than 100 the following day. The frequency of the activity caused great alarm in Valparaíso, to the extent that funds were immediately sought by Mexican and Chilean scientists for travel expenses and to bring additional equipment to set up portable seismograph stations. Prior to their arrival on 5 March, the final foreshock in the sequence arrived just seconds prior to the mainshock. (Note: The origin of the aftershock's intensity details, as detailed on the NHRP/NEIC website, are with the monthly listing of the Preliminary Determination of Epicenters)

== Earthquake ==
=== Characteristics ===
The Centro Sismológico Nacional de la Universidad de Chile, the USGS, and the International Seismological Centre all place the magnitude at 8.0 M_{w}. Other figures exist, like the initial 1985 observation from the Preliminary Determination of Epicenters, which placed it at 7.8 M_{s} and the Harvard–Adam Dziewonski Observatory, which places it at 7.9 M_{w}. Harvard's slip parameters for the strike, dip, and rake are 11°, 26°, and 110°. A 1986 study, with only a one-degree change in the dip angle, placed the figures at 11°, 25°, and 110°. A 1994 study compared their own figures regarding rupture length, depth, and duration, with those of nine previous studies. Of the six studies that contributed duration information that was gathered using different seismic networks, a range was given from 40 to 80 seconds, with a mode of 69 seconds. The focal depth was equally diverse, with five kilometers on the low end to 60 km on the high end. The fault's rupture length had a range of 75 to 250 kilometers, with the highest figure derived from geodetic information alone.

The authors of the same 1994 study presented more details from earlier workers, as well as their own analysis of the mainshock characteristics, which included data from both the Global Digital Seismograph Network and the GEOSCOPE Observatory. Their results showed a 200 km (120 mi) bi-lateral rupture on the Nazca–South American plate boundary, though only three of the ten previous studies shared similar information regarding rupture directivity. They revealed that it primarily ruptured to the south of the epicenter, with just 50 kilometers (31 mi) of the rupture to the north, over a total duration of 70 seconds.

=== Intensity ===
Compared with on-the-ground observations of damage and ground effects, isoseismal maps provide a rudimentary overview of the intensity that was experienced. Professor Rodolfo Saragoni from the University of Chile provided one of these maps that shows zones of mixed intensities within roughly 150 kilometers (93 mi) of the epicenter, (Note: Professor Saragoni's map is not available as it was first published in printed form in Saragoni, González & Fresard 1985 but it appears on page 72 of Wood, Wight & Moehle 1987 and a slightly modified version appears in figure 4.1 of Booth & Taylor 1988) where mixed groups include V–VI, VI–VII, or VII–VIII. These areas are relatively small and isolated areas of higher intensities embedded in much larger areas of lower intensity. For example, Rengo is in a very small intensity VIII (Severe) zone, but is itself surround by a slightly larger zone of VII (Very strong) intensity that includes Curicó, San Fernando, and Rancagua. Both of these areas are embedded within a VI–VII zone that stretches roughly 320 km (200 mi) from Talca to La Ligua. Another example is that the city of Algarrobo is in an area of VI–VII shaking, while embedded in a zone of VII–VIII shaking that includes nearby communities of Valparaíso, San Antonio, Llolleo, and Viña del Mar. Santiago was marked as intensity VII. Cities designated as having experienced intensity VI shaking included Linares and Illapel. The map shows a more linear pattern of attenuation farther from the epicentral area.

On the ground, the shock's area of perceptibility was from Copiapó in the north to Valdivia in the south, a distance of more than 1,400 kilometers (870 mi). (Note: The distance from Copiapó to Valdivia (1,407 km (874 mi)), is comparable to that of Seattle to Las Vegas (1,406 km (874 mi)), Dublin to Milan (1,418 km (881 mi)), or Baghdad to Dubai (1,381 km (858 mi))) Some people in high rises felt their buildings sway on the east coast of South America, both at Buenos Aires, Argentina (1,200 km (750 mi) distant) and São Paulo in Brazil (2,700 km (1,700 mi) distant). Several other reconnaissance and damage surveys provided more specific details when describing the observed intensity than the isoseismal maps. The Earthquake Engineering Research Institute's report agreed with the University of Illinois study that the intensity was generally VII in Santiago. An intensity of VII is stated as the most appropriate intensity of shaking for Valparaíso and Viña del Mar, but an accommodation for intensity VIII effects was made, based on several instances of considerable damage or partial collapse of buildings. With areas of liquefaction, considerable damage and rock slides, San Antonio was placed at intensity VIII. The same could be said for Llolleo, but an exception was made for small areas of intensity IX (Violent) effects. A separate strong ground motion study also published a figure of IX for a heavily damaged school at Llolleo.

=== Casualties ===
==== Deaths ====
The USGS's Preliminary Determination of Epicenters and Utsu 2002 list 177 fatalities and 2,575 injuries, while the Belgian Centre for Research on the Epidemiology of Disasters' EM-DAT database lists slightly higher losses, with 180 dead and a slightly lower number of injured at 2,483. The National Geophysical Data Center again lists a slightly higher death toll of 200 and repeats the Utsu figure of 2,575 injured. President Augusto Pinochet said in a speech regarding the state of the nation that "Esta tragedia provocó en la zona central del país la pérdida de numerosas vidas humanas, más de dos mil quinientos heridos" (This tragedy caused the loss of numerous human lives in the central part of the country, more than two thousand five hundred injured). (Note: PAGER-CAT is a compilation of parametric earthquake catalogs. Included are the Preliminary Determination of Epicenters, PAGER, EM-DAT (from the Centre for Research on the Epidemiology of Disasters), and the National Geophysical Data Center Significant Earthquake Database, and others)

==== Injuries ====
A study on the epidemiology of the injured, authored by staff from Chile's Ministry of Health and Department of Planning, acknowledged the profound difficulties in establishing a complete understanding of the situation. Contributing to the problems were sometimes as simple as medical personnel failing to provide complete records or as complex as the complete loss of hospital or clinical facilities. Rengo Hospital, for example, collapsed entirely and 12 other hospitals required replacing due to structural damage, though no fatalities occurred at these facilities. The reduction in the number of beds available, misplaced files, and incomplete records all contributed to inconsistent numerical data. Despite these challenges, the authors presented an overview of the injured, and acknowledged a total figure of 2,575. Their work comprised a subset of those, which represented 811 women and 784 men for a total of 1,623.

== Aftershocks ==
A number of large (M6+) and very large (M7+) aftershocks occurred in the following month, although the majority of them were moderate in intensity and did not cause any additional damage. Also, any casualties that occurred were not directly related and instead were attributed to sudden death from cardiac causes. On the day of the mainshock, two events of at least 6.4 M_{s} occurred and the following day, at least thirteen shocks took place, including a 7.4 M_{w} event. Six aftershocks took place on 5 March, then activity continued, but at a decreasing frequency, including the 6.7 M_{w} shocks on 17 and 19 March, and the 7.2 M_{w} Rapel Lake event on 9 April. These last three events had intensities of VII (Very strong), VI (Strong), and VI in Valparaíso. One heart attack and damage in Valparaíso was attributed to the 17 March event, and two deaths, several injuries, and additional damage occurred as result of the Rapel Lake shock on 9 April. (Note: Magnitudes for these aftershocks are taken from Nealy 2017; intensity details are from Wood, Wight & Moehle 1987; damage and effects are from Stover & Brewer 1991)

== Tsunami ==
A destructive local tsunami was observed.

== Aftermath ==
=== Scientific response ===
Multiple seismological agencies from around the world were sent to assist professor Nicolas Velasco Saragoni from the University of Chile and professor Patricio Bonelli from Federico Santa María Technical University, as well as staff from Universidad Católica de Chile. The foreign teams assisted with damage, engineering, geological, and intensity surveys. Seismologists Mehmet Çelebi and George Plafker arrived on 21 March from the United States Geological Survey. Brought with them were additional seismometers and accelerographs, which were delivered to (and operated by) the National Autonomous University of Mexico and the University of Chile. These instruments were deployed at temporary locations to augment the existing Chilean seismograph network to improve its ability to locate aftershocks and gather strong motion data. Other foreign teams included the Earthquake Engineering Research Institute, the British Institution of Structural Engineers, the New Zealand National Society for Earthquake Engineering, and a trio from University of California, Berkeley, University of Michigan, and the University of Illinois.

== See also ==
- List of earthquakes in 1985
- List of earthquakes in Chile

== Sources ==
- Booth, E. D.; Taylor, C. A. (1988), The Chilean Earthquake of 3 March 1985 – A Field Report By EEFIT (PDF), Earthquake Engineering Field Investigation Team
- Comte, D.; Eisenberg, A.; Lorca, E.; Pardo, M.; Ponce, L.; Saragoni, R.; Singh, S. K.; Suárez, G. (1986), "The 1985 Central Chile Earthquake: A Repeat of Previous Great Earthquakes in the Region?", Science, 233 (4762): 449–453, Bibcode:1986Sci...233..449C, doi:10.1126/science.233.4762.449, ISSN 0036-8075, PMID 17794569
- Hayes, G. P.; Smoczyk, G. M.; Benz, H. M.; Villaseñor, A.; Furlong, K. P. (2015), "Seismicity of the Earth 1900–2013: Seismotectonics of South America (Nazca Plate Region)", USGS Report, Open-File Report: 25, Bibcode:2015usgs.rept...25H, doi:10.3133/ofr20151031e
- Mendoza, C.; Hartzell, S.; Monfret, T. (1994), "Wide-band analysis of the 3 March 1985 central Chile earthquake: Overall source process and rupture history", Bulletin of the Seismological Society of America, 84 (2): 269–283, Bibcode:1994BuSSA..84..269M, doi:10.1785/BSSA0840020269 (inactive 11 July 2025)
- Musson, R. M. W.; Cecić, I. (27 September 2002), "Macroseismology", in Lee, W. H. K.; Jennings, P.; Kisslinger, C.; Kanamori, H. (eds.), International Handbook of Earthquake & Engineering Seismology, Part A, Elsevier, pp. 807–822, ISBN 978-0-08-048922-3
- Saragoni, H. R.; González, P.; Fresard, M. (1985). Análisis de los Acelerogramas del Terremoto del 3 de Marzo de 1985 (in Spanish). Santiago: Universidad de Chile, Facultad de Ciencias Físicas y Matemáticas, Departamento de Ingeniería Civil, Sección Ingeniería Estructural. OCLC 81873703.
- Utsu, T. R. (2002), "A List of Deadly Earthquakes in the World: 1500–2000", International Handbook of Earthquake & Engineering Seismology, Part A, Volume 81A (First ed.), Academic Press, ISBN 978-0-12-440652-0
- Wood, S. L.; Wight, J. K.; Moehle, J. P. (1987), "The 1985 Chile earthquake—Observations on earthquake-resistant construction in Viña del Mar" (PDF), Civil Engineering Studies: Structural Research Series, Structural Research Series No. 532, University of Illinois at Urbana–Champaign, ISSN 0069-4274, OCLC 6156187
