= Diario Austral =

Chilean newspaper

El Diario Austral de Los Ríos
- Front page of Diario Austral's 11 September 2013 edition. Front page of Diario Austral's 11 September 2013 edition.
- Type: Daily newspaper
- Format: Berliner
- Owner(s): El Mercurio group
- Founded: November 12, 1982
- Political alignment: Conservative
- Headquarters: Valdivia, Chile
- Website: El diario Austral de Los Ríos

El Diario Austral de Los Ríos is a Chilean daily newspaper published in Valdivia. The newspaper was founded in 1982 as El Diario Austral de Valdivia by the newspaper group Sociedad Periodística Araucanía S.A., owned by El Mercurio. It is distributed in the Los Ríos Region. Since the Los Ríos Region began its functions in 2007, the newspaper has also adopted the El Diario Austral de la Región de Los Ríos name.
