= 1985 Wuqia earthquake =

Earthquake in Xinjiang, China

- Location within Southern Xinjiang
- UTC time: 1985-08-23 12:42:01
- ISC event: 518737
- USGS-ANSS: ComCat
- Local date: 23 August 1985
- Local time: 20:42:01
- Magnitude: M_{s} 7.4
- Depth: 6.8 km (4.2 mi)
- Epicenter: 39.413°N 75.224°E
- Areas affected: China
- Max. intensity: MMI VII (Very strong)
- Casualties: 71 dead, 162 injured

The 1985 Wuqia earthquake occurred on August 23, 1985, at 20:42 local time (12:42 UTC) near the border of Wuqia County and Shufu County, Xinjiang, China. It had a magnitude of M_{s} 7.4 and caused 71 deaths, 162 injuries, and left 15,000 homeless, as well as destroying 85% of buildings and highways. The source of this earthquake is the Kazkeaerte Fault (卡兹克阿尔特断裂). The earthquake could be felt throughout much of the Fergana Basin, USSR, as well as in Pakistan.

The slipping of the earth during this earthquake caused a deformation zone along the Kezilesu River valley stretching 15 kilometres (9 1/3 miles) long and 800 metres (1/2 mile) wide. The zone is made up of smaller faults, fissures, and pressure ridges.
