= San Ramón Fault =

Geological fault in Chile

The San Ramón Fault (Spanish: Falla de San Ramón) is a Chilean geological fault, located in eastern Santiago Metropolitan Region, passing through the eastern part of Santiago marking the boundary between the Chilean Central Valley and the Andes. As an active thrust fault it constitutes a seismic hazard zone for the densely populated Santiago. A large number of homes and educational centers have been built on or near the fault, along with a gas plant in Peñalolén. The Chilean Nuclear Energy Commission has a reactor in La Reina, very close to the fault, which has raised concerns among the population. It runs 5 kilometers underground and extends for 25 kilometers in a north–south direction, lying between the Mapocho River and Maipo River. It is known to pass underneath the communes of Vitacura, Las Condes, La Reina, Peñalolén, La Florida and Puente Alto, and suspected to continue into Lo Barnechea and Pirque at its extremes. Due to its shallowness, it can cause very destructive superficial earthquakes with a magnitude around 7 on the Richter scale, with a general recurrence period of over 300 years.

== Geological behavior ==
The San Ramón is a thrust fault with vertical slippage which has caused the formation of the Sierra de Ramón, a 25 kilometer long mountain chain with a maximum height of 3249 meters above sea level. This range has moved noticeably in the last 10 million years, and grown notably during the recent Quaternary period, which makes it a geologically active fault. It shows traces of deformation on the order of 0,02 mm/year, making it capable of producing significant earthquakes, such as in 1575 and 1647. The fault represents a discontinuity in the rocky subsoil which modifies its characteristics by fragmenting the rock, generating fault ruptures, dislocation and fracturing of blocks in the immediate surroundings, and even generating hot springs which chemically alter the rock.

== See also ==
- El Arrayán Fault
