= La Cruz Hill =

Coordinates: 34°23′48.48″S 72°00′47.18″W

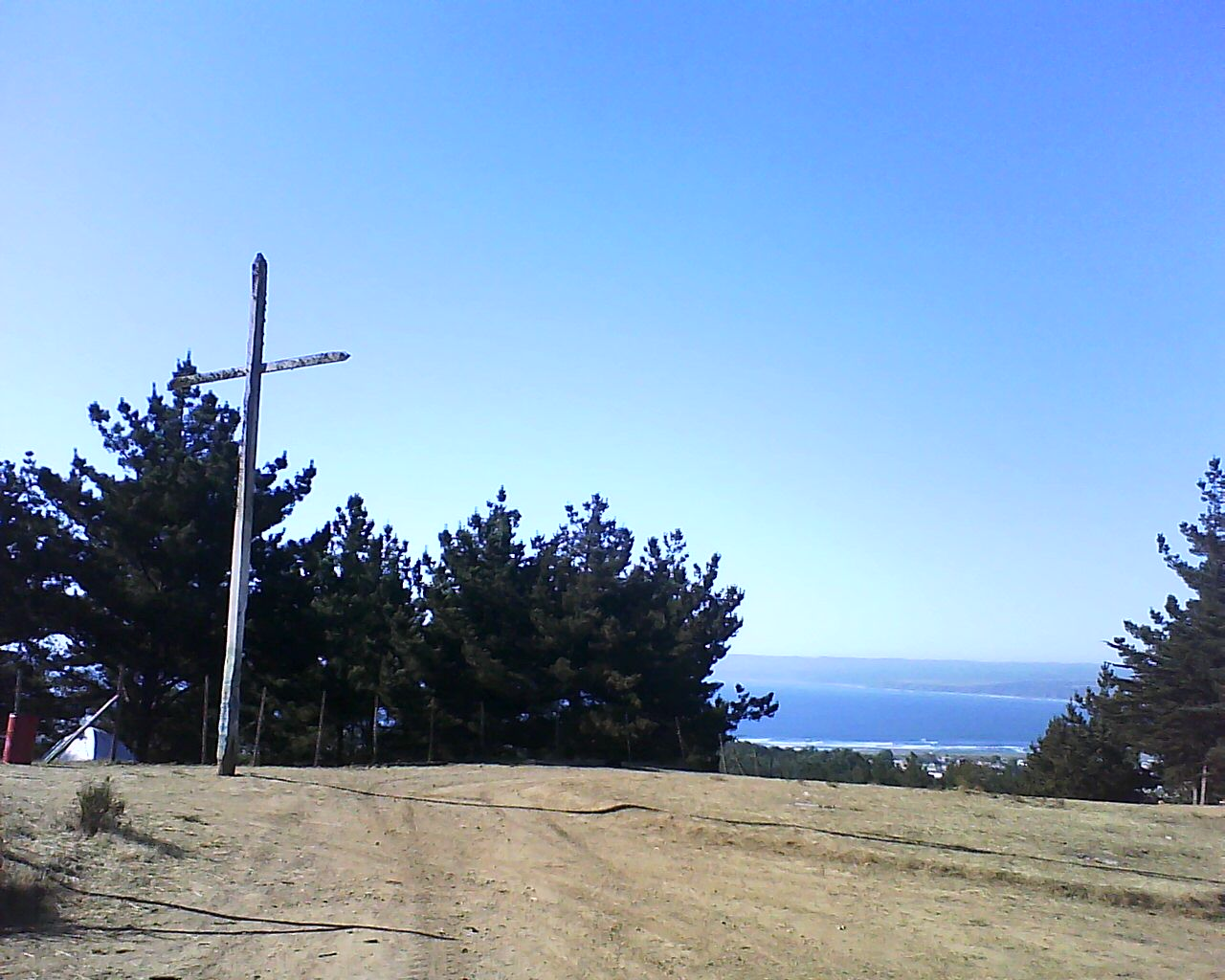
The cross (Spanish: La Cruz).

La Cruz Hill (Spanish: Cerro La Cruz) is a hill located in Pichilemu, Chile; the tallest point of the city. The hill is named after the cross located at its top.

Mountain bike competitions take place regularly on the hill, which is also one of the main attractions of Pichilemu.
