= Il Postino (opera) =

2010 opera by Daniel Catán

- Opera by Daniel Catán
- DVD cover of the premiere performance of Il Postino
- Librettist: Daniel Catán
- Language: Spanish
- Based on: Ardiente paciencia by Antonio Skármeta and the film Il Postino by Michael Radford
- Premiere: 23 September 2010; Dorothy Chandler Pavilion, Los Angeles

Il Postino is an opera in three acts by Daniel Catán with a Spanish libretto by the composer. Based on the novel Ardiente paciencia by Antonio Skármeta and the film Il Postino by Michael Radford, the work contains elements of drama and comedy, integrating themes of love and friendship along with political and spiritual conflict. The opera premiered at the Dorothy Chandler Pavilion by Los Angeles Opera on 23 September 2010.

Set on a small Italian island, exiled Chilean poet Pablo Neruda receives so much fan mail that a personal postman, Mario Ruoppolo, is hired to deliver his letters. Smitten by Beatrice Russo, a local barmaid, Mario turns to Pablo for help writing poetry that would help him win the heart of the woman he longs for. Soon after, Mario and Beatrice fall in love and marry. In the third act, influenced by Pablo's works, Mario begins writing political poems and while reciting at a communist demonstration, violence breaks out and he receives a fatal gunshot wound.

Il Postino was commissioned by Los Angeles Opera who co-produced the premiere production with the Theater an der Wien in Vienna and Théâtre du Châtelet in Paris. Daniel Catán wrote the role of Pablo Neruda for Plácido Domingo, who sang it at the Los Angeles premiere and in subsequent performances in Vienna and Paris.

== Background and performance history ==
Il Postino was the fifth and last of Daniel Catán's operas and the first one for which he had also written the libretto. His route to creating the work began when he first saw the 1994 film Il Postino and thought it would make a good opera. However, at the time, he was in the midst of composing Florencia en el Amazonas and then received a commission from Houston Grand Opera for his fourth opera Salsipuedes which premiered in 2004. After completing that work, he returned to the Postino project. In an interview shortly before the premiere Catán said:

It's rare that an idea I had 15 years ago resurfaces, then I take it on, because one changes so much in that time. But when I came back to this idea, in fact I was still interested in it, but for different reasons. Instead of identifying with the Mario character, with the young aspiring poet, in fact now I could see the story from the other point of view, which was of the older poet.

Discussions with Plácido Domingo who had become the General Director of Los Angeles Opera in 2003 led to a commission from the company which was announced in 2005. The premiere was to have taken place in the 2009 season starring Domingo as the poet Neruda and Rolando Villazón as Mario. However, financial difficulties at Los Angeles Opera caused the postponement of the premiere until the following season. In the interim, Villazón, who was recovering from surgery on his vocal chords, withdrew from the production and was eventually replaced by Charles Castronovo.

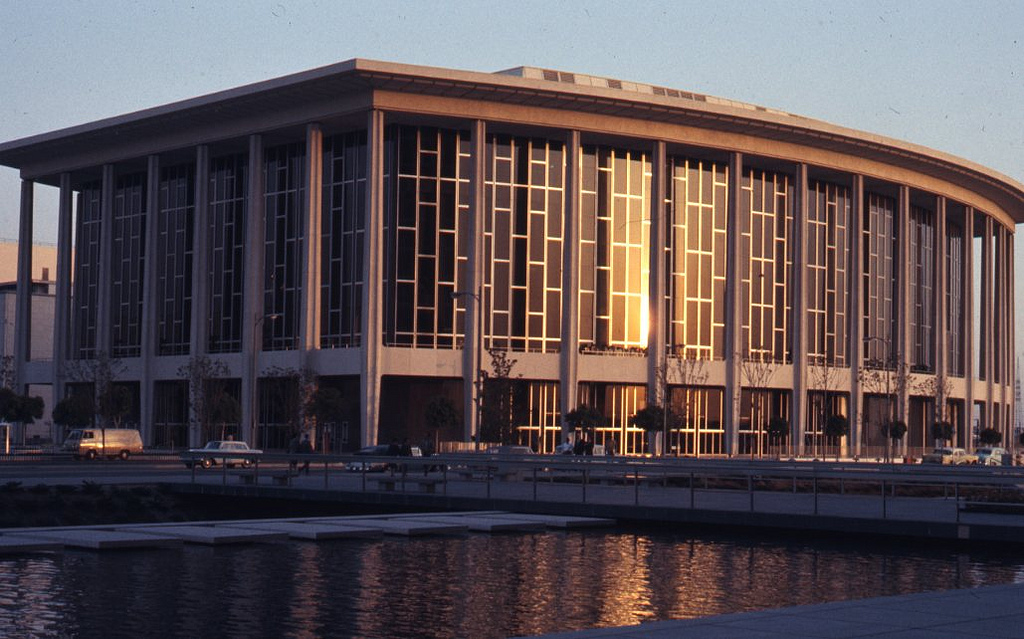
The Dorothy Chandler Pavilion in Los Angeles where Il Postino had its world premiere

The opera finally premiered on 23 September 2010 as the opening production of the 2010 season. It was conducted by Grant Gershon and directed by Ron Daniels with sets and costumes designed by Riccardo Hernandez. The staging also included projections designed by Philip Bussmann that created a Mediterranean atmosphere and at various points showed old footage of political unrest in Chile and a blackboard with poetry written on it. Following the premiere, the Chilean government conferred the Orden al Mérito Pablo Neruda on Daniel Catán, Antonio Skármeta, Plácido Domingo and Cristina Gallardo-Domâs who sang the role of Neruda's wife Matilde.

The Los Angeles production ran for six performances, ending on 16 October and was filmed for a later broadcast on PBS television. The following December the production went to Vienna's Theater an der Wien with largely the same cast, including Domingo as Neruda. He also sang the role when the production travelled to the Théâtre du Châtelet in Paris in June 2011 and to Santiago, Chile, in July 2012. Domingo was to have sung the role in July 2013 at the Teatro Real in Madrid, again in the same production, but was forced to withdraw when he suffered a pulmonary embolism and was replaced by the Spanish tenor Vicente Ombuena. Ombuena also sang the role of Neruda when the production travelled to Mexico City's Palacio de Bellas Artes for the opera's Mexico premiere in October 2011.

Il Postino had its US East Coast premiere in a separate production at the Prince Music Theater in Philadelphia in May 2012, performed by Center City Opera Theater, a chamber opera company. On that occasion the orchestral scoring was reduced to 21 players. The opera was also given a new production in July 2016 performed by Opera Saratoga in Saratoga Springs, New York. Student performances have included the University of Houston's Moores School of Music in 2011 and the Mannes School of Music in 2014 (the opera's New York City premiere).

== Libretto ==
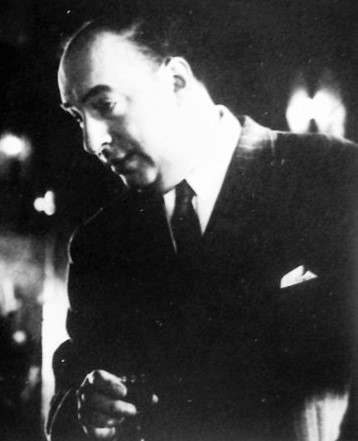
Pablo Neruda in 1951

In writing the libretto, Catán followed the plot of the Michael Radford's Italian film Il Postino (and its attendant anachronisms) quite faithfully, but he also used Antonio Skármeta's 1985 novel Ardiente paciencia (on which the film had been based) to develop the characterization of Pablo Neruda. The actor Massimo Troisi, who played the title role in the film and died shortly after it was completed, owned the rights to the screenplay and had willed them to his five siblings. Once Catán had decided on the Postino project, he visited each of them personally to secure the adaptation rights rather than relying on lawyers. According to Catán's son, he had almost completely formulated the characterisations of the principal singers before he began the actual composition, and the libretto manuscripts contained relatively few revisions.

The entirely fictional story of Neruda and his postman is told in both the film and Skármeta's novel. However, there are several key differences between the novel and both the film and the opera. Ardiente paciencia is set in Chile during the rise and fall of the Allende Government in the early 1970s with Neruda and his wife Matilde living in their house at Isla Negra, on the Chilean coast. The film and opera move the locale from Chile to a fictional Italian island and the time to the early 1950s. Although Neruda and Matilde (who were not yet married) did sojourn to Italy during his exile from Chile and stayed on the Isle of Capri on-and-off between 1951 and 1952, they were guests in Edwin Cerio's villa there and did not have their own house. At that time Neruda had not yet achieved the world-wide fame as a poet that he had by the early 1970s when he won the Nobel Prize for Literature. The poems quoted in both the film and the opera were written several years after he returned to Chile. In the opera, Neruda's act 1 aria "Desnuda" uses the text from "Mañana XXVII" in Cien Sonetos de Amor which was first published in 1959.

Like all of Catán's previous operas, the libretto was in Spanish. In a 2008 essay published in Revista de Musicología, he wrote of his dream to establish a strong tradition of Spanish-language opera, which was still lacking in both Spain and Latin America. At the time, he was working on the libretto for Il Postino and wrote:

Is it not ironic, for example, that it has been the Italian cinema that rescued Neruda with Il Postino? (Note: The success of the film and the marketing strategy of its distributor Miramax led to a surge of interest in Neruda's poetry in the English-speaking world. Miramax released a book, Love: Ten Poems by Pablo Neruda, and a recording of well-known actors reading his poems to accompany the film. Miramax also organized and sponsored poetry readings around the US in conjunction with Copper Canyon Press who had recently published several volumes of Neruda's poetry in English translation.) I will now take back Il Postino. I will make it into an opera and will restore our language to it. Why rescue when we can create? (Note: Original Spanish : "¿No es irónico, por ejemplo, que haya sido el cine italiano el que rescató a Neruda con Il Postino? Yo ahora retomo Il Postino, lo convierto en ópera y lo devuelvo a nuestra lengua. ¿Por qué rescatar cuando podemos crear?")

The language choice drew a mixed reaction from the critics. The Los Angeles Times critic found it "peculiar" given the Italian setting. Ronald Blum writing for the Associated Press thought the mismatch was "a bit jarring" but found that the effect dissipated as the opera unfolded. The critic for the British magazine Opera wrote "The only real problem is that Catán, for some inexplicable reason, keeps the story set in Italy-despite writing the opera in Spanish. [...] Likewise, Skármeta's novel is set not in Italy but on an island off the coast of Chile. Where was the dramaturge during all of this?"

== Roles ==
Roles, voice types, premiere cast
Role	Voice type	Premiere cast, 23 September 2010 Conductor: Grant Gershon
Mario Ruoppolo, postman on a small Italian island	tenor	Charles Castronovo
Pablo Neruda, poet living in exile on the island	tenor	Plácido Domingo
Beatrice Russo, a barmaid beloved by Mario	soprano	Amanda Squitieri
Matilde Neruda, Pablo's wife	soprano	Cristina Gallardo-Domâs
Giorgio, the island's postmaster	bass-baritone	Vladimir Chernov
Donna Rosa, Beatrice's aunt	mezzo-soprano	Nancy Fabiola Herrera
Di Cosimo, a local politician	baritone	José Adán Pérez
Mario's Father	tenor	Gabriel Osuna
Priest	tenor	Christopher Gillett

== Synopsis ==
Setting: The fictional Italian island of Cala di Sotto during the 1950s

=== Act 1 ===
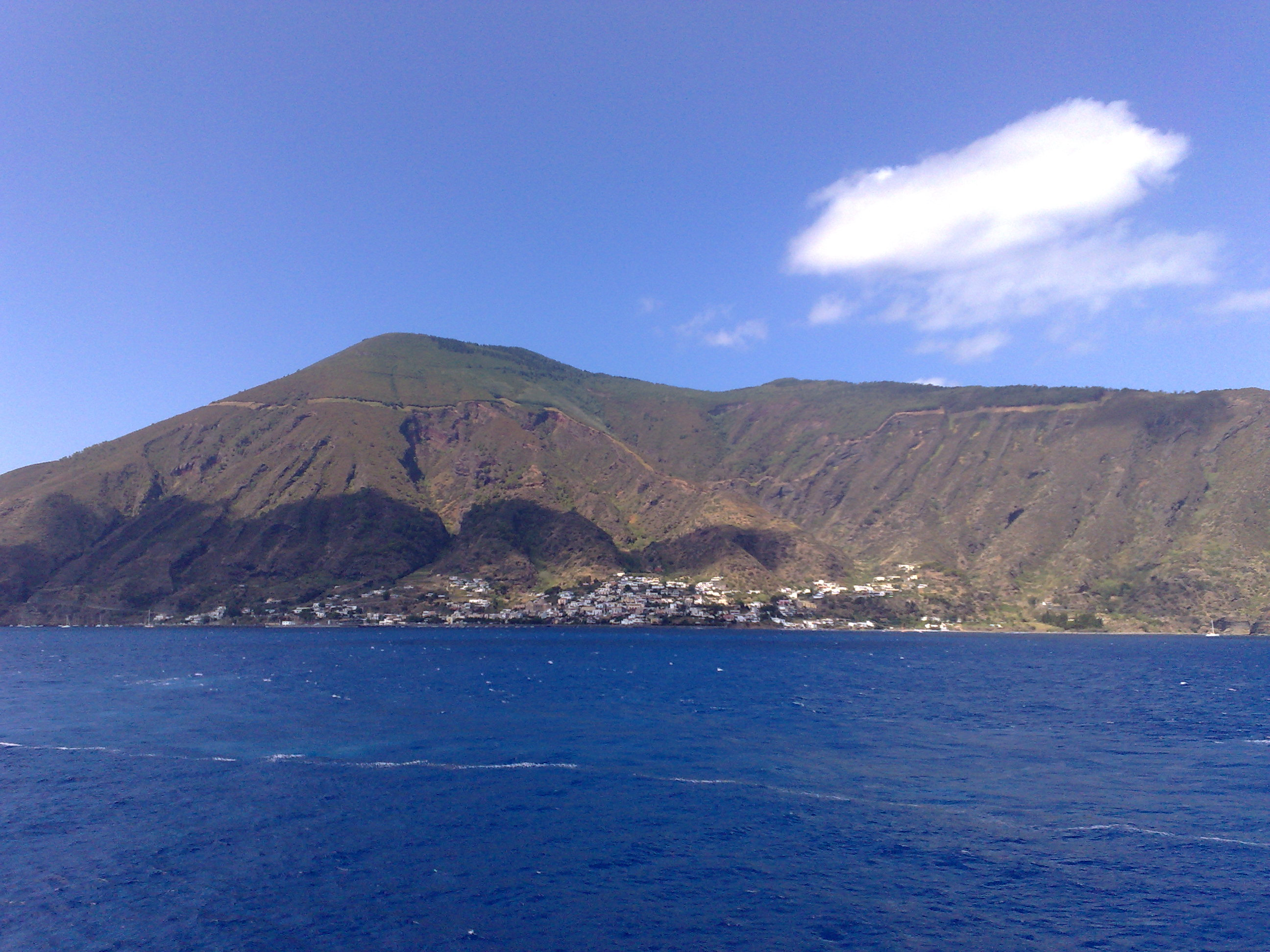
The Island of Salina, used in the film Il Postino as the setting for the fictional island of Cala di Sotto

Prelude
Di Cosimo, a politician running for office on the island, sings a nationalist song. Soon after, an announcement is made on the radio stating that Pablo Neruda, a great Chilean poet, has arrived in Rome. Exiled, he will live on the island of Cala di Sotto.

Scene 1: "No papá, no hay agua"
In his bedroom, Mario describes to his father how much he dislikes working as a fisherman. He then reveals that he has found a new job working as a postman.

Scene 2: "Tus manos…"
The following day, Pablo is reading on the patio when his wife Matilde arrives. Embracing her, he poetically sings "Desnuda" ("Nude"), relating her and her body to the beauty of nature.

Scene 3: "Buenos dias…su correo"
Mario arrives, delivering Pablo's mail. Catching the couple in an embrace, Pablo quickly turns to Mario and collects his mail, meeting him for the first time.

Scene 4: "Mujer! Mujer!"
At the post office, Mario sits with postmaster Giorgio, examining the letters to be delivered to Pablo. Discovering that most of the letters are from women, Mario tells Giorgio that he bought one of Pablo's books and wants to have it signed so that he can impress others.

"Desnuda" from act 1, scene 2
Pablo Neruda singing "Desnuda" to his wife Matilde

Scene 5: "Correo! Correo!"
During the next delivery, Mario tells Pablo that he wants to become a poet so that he too can have women fall in love with him. Pablo tells him to observe the world around him and discover its metaphors. Using the sea as an example, Pablo sings "Oda al mar" ("Ode to the Sea"), describing the blue water as it spills and moves. Mario soon begins to understand Pablo's words in the duet "Metaforas" ("Metaphors").

Scene 6: Romanza
The barmaid Beatrice Russo is introduced, singing a romanza while working in a local café. Mario, taken by her beauty, approaches her. The two play a game of table soccer and Beatrice beats him handily. Mario learns her name.

Scene 7: "Don Pablo!"
Pablo arrives at the docks. Mario, holding a delivery of mail, runs to him and confesses that he is in love with Beatrice. Pablo laughs. Mario asks him for help writing a poem to impress Beatrice but Pablo declines as he does not know her. Giving Pablo his mail, Mario declines payment.

Scene 8: "Ya duerme el mar"
In chorus, the dockworkers sing of the sea.

=== Act 2 ===
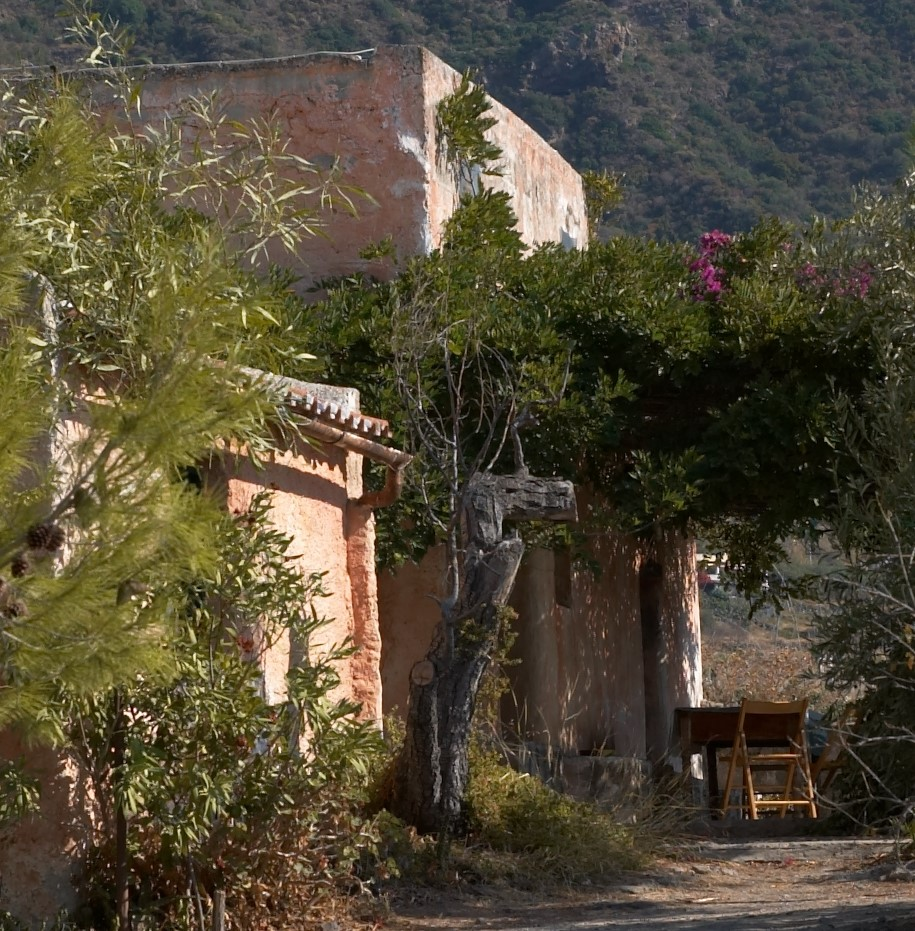
The house on the Island of Salina used as the setting for Neruda's house in the film Il Postino

Scene 1: "Que haces?"
Beatrice is in her bedroom thinking of Mario. Her aunt, Donna Rosa enters the room and is displeased by her niece's contact with the younger man. Beatrice, falling in love with Mario, tells her aunt that he spoke to her in metaphors. Soon they argue over Mario's intentions and Donna Rosa finds a letter from Mario. She takes it away and leaves the room.

Scene 2: "Tus manos..."
Di Cosimo, seeking votes at the next election, promises to bring water to the island. Giorgio and others complain that he's been promising this for years. Di Cosimo calls them liars and states that it wasn't him making the promises. Excited at the prospect of workers coming to the island and becoming customers, Donna Rosa pledges her support for Di Cosimo.

Scene 3: Love Duet #1
Mario approaches Beatrice in the evening, singing more metaphors in an effort to impress her. Influenced by her aunt, Beatrice is reluctant to accept Mario's advances.

Scene 4: "Te caíste de la cama"
In his next delivery, Mario brings Pablo an audio reel. Pablo gives him a book that will help him with his metaphors, then introduces him to a sound recorder. The device plays, telling them that Pablo's book is a big success in Chile and will be re-printed.

Scene 5: "Léamela Padre"
Distressed, Donna Rosa runs to the priest and gives him Mario's letter to read. Upon hearing the letter, Donna Rosa is horrified by the contents of the poetry written to Beatrice.

"Love Duet #2" from act 2, scene 6
The second love duet sung by Mario and Beatrice

Scene 6: Love Duet #2
Mario and Beatrice meet in the night, sharing an embrace. With a gun, Donna Rosa comes looking for them, calling out for her niece. Mario and Beatrice share a kiss and Beatrice runs away.

Scene 7: "Chile la sangre de tus hijos"
Pablo receives a letter from Chile telling him that there is more bloodshed. Singing "Chile la sangre de tus hijos" ("Chile, blood of your children") Pablo laments the lives lost and the difficulties back at home. Matilde enters the room and Pablo shares his grief. Mario arrives, wanting to speak to Pablo but waits as the couple embraces. Exchanging their affection, Pablo and Matilde sing "Comprendo" ("I Understand").

Scenes 8 and 9: "Señor Neruda!"
Donna Rosa cries out Pablo's name. In a panic, Mario runs into Pablo's room and hides. Donna Rosa arrives with a gun and tells Pablo that Mario is poisoning her niece with metaphors. She threatens to shoot Mario if he meets with Beatrice again, then leaves.

Scene 10: Love Duet #3
Alone, Mario sings out to Beatrice. Beatrice responds and they soon meet, sharing their love for each other. Donna Rosa tries to pursue them unsuccessfully.

Scene 11: "The Wedding"
Mario and Beatrice wed. After the wedding, the guests gather at a table and celebrate. Donna Rosa, unhappy with the marriage, greets Mario hesitantly. Mario's father sings a song which is followed by a speech given from Mario. Pablo sings a song for the newlywed couple and the guests celebrate.

=== Act 3 ===
Prelude and Scene 1: "No, Don Pablo"
Pablo and Matilde are preparing for their trip home to Chile. Pablo offers Mario money as he will soon be unemployed. Reluctantly he accepts and the two say goodbye.

Scenes 2–5: "Qué Pasa"
Workers are laying the water pipe promised by Di Cosimo. Giorgio arrives and tells Mario that Pablo is giving an award in Russia. Di Cosimo's thugs arrive, passing out flyers. Word comes that Pablo is in Paris. In an interview Pablo states that he misses the island but not the people, causing some to get upset and feel forgotten.

News comes that Di Cosimo has won the election. Soon he arrives, notifying Donna Rosa that all water work is being aborted, breaking his promise. Mario approaches Di Cosimo and is threatened.

"Más bien era yo" from act 3, scene 6
After receiving the impersonal letter from Neruda, Mario feels forgotten

Scene 6: Scene and Aria "Más bien era yo"
An impersonal letter arrives from Pablo's secretary asking Mario to send the man's remaining items to Chile. Hurt, Mario feels forgotten and sings "Más bien era yo" ("Rather it was me"). Beatrice tells Mario that she's pregnant.

Scene 7: "Comprendo"
Returning to Pablo's home, Mario finds the recording of him and Pablo. On the recording Pablo sings "Comprendo" ("I Understand").

Scene 8: "Estás seguro?"
Mario retrieves the audio recorder. He and Giorgio connect the device to a battery and travel the island, collecting its sounds.

Scene 9:"Es Curioso" Time passes and Pablo and Matilde return to the island. Looking for Mario, they find Beatrice where she explains that Mario was invited to read his poetry at a communist demonstration. The event turned violent and Mario was shot and killed.

Duet: "Querido Don Pablo" (Mario's Farewell)
Pablo is given a recording of Mario. In the recording Mario thanks Pablo for bringing poetry into his life.

== Critical reception ==
The critics writing on both the American and the Austrian premieres remarked on the "unapologetically" melodious nature of the score and noted that it was reminiscent of Puccini, both in the instrumental colors of the orchestral interludes and in the arias, singling out particularly the writing for the woodwinds and strings. In his review of the Austrian premiere George Loomis wrote that like Catán's previous operas, the score was marked by a "musical shapeliness" and a "capacity to soar and [...] move the listener." He also summarized the mixed critical reception in the German and Austrian press noting that the Frankfurter Allgemeine Zeitung pronounced it "a triumph" but Die Presse described the opera's story as "smothered in operatic sugar-icing", with more than one review describing it as kitsch. Anne Midgette wrote in The Washington Post that "the language spoken by Catán's lovely score is universal: the safely melodious terrain of international opera." It was a view echoed by Joshua Kosman in the San Francisco Chronicle who described the opera as a "lovely though limited" work and wrote that "operagoers who complain that they don't write 'em like they used to can take comfort from Il Postino".

== Recordings ==
- Catán: Il Postino (DVD, 2012) – Plácido Domingo, Charles Castronovo, Cristina Gallardo-Domas, Vladimir Chernov; Los Angeles Opera Orchestra and Chorus conducted by Grant Gershon; stage direction by Ron Daniels; television direction by Brian Large. Label: Sony Classical 88691919 7099

Filmed during the premiere run with the original cast in October 2010, this recording was first broadcast in 2011 as part of the PBS television series Great Performances and was released on DVD the following year.
