= Ángela Becerra =

Colombian writer (born 1957)

Ángela Becerra Acevedo
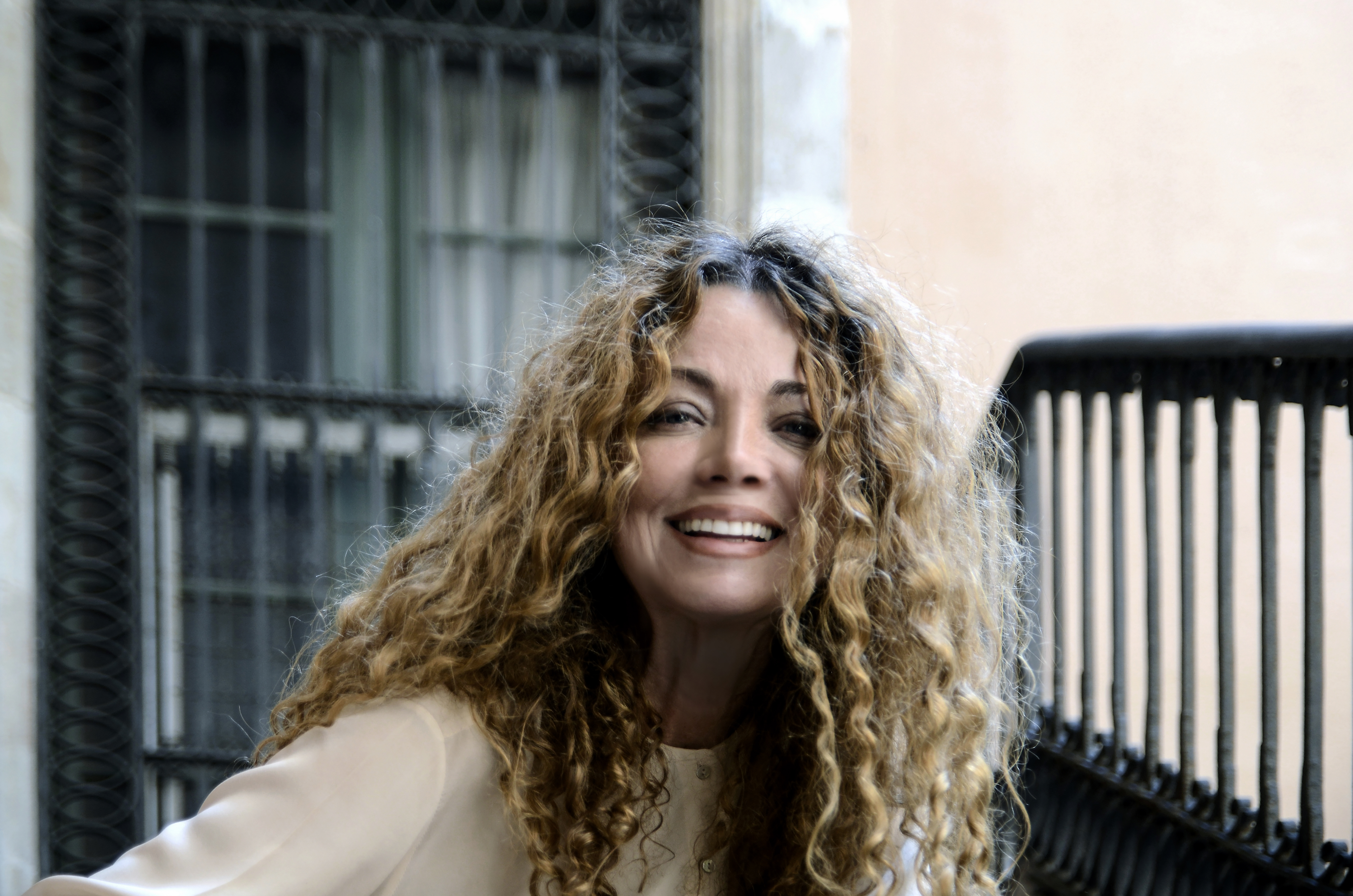
- Becerra in Barcelona, 2019
- Born: Ángela Becerra Acevedo; 17 July 1957 (age 69) Cali, Colombia
- Occupation: Author
- Language: Spanish
- Literary movement: Magical Idealism
- Notable awards: Fernando Lara Novel Award 2019 Premio Planeta-Casa de América 2009 Premio Azorín de novela 2005 Several Latin Literary Awards
- Spouse: Joaquín Lorente
- Children: Ángela y María

Website
- angelabecerra.com

Ángela Becerra Acevedo (July 17, 1957) is a Colombian writer. She has won several awards such as the Premio Fernando Lara de Novela in 2019 (Fernando Lara Novel Award), the Planeta-Casa de América Award (Premio Planeta - Casa de América) in 2009, the Azorín Prize (Premio Azorín) in 2005 and four Chicago Latin Literary Awards, as well as the Premio Iberoamericano Planeta-Casa de América de Narrativa. Her works have been translated into 23 languages and published in more than 50 countries. She is one of the most widely read Spanish-speaking authors, the most read Colombian writer after Gabriel García Márquez, and considered the creator of the Magical Idealism.

== First steps, life and years as a publicist ==
Born in the Colombian city of Cali, she is the daughter of Marco Tulio Becerra and Cilia Acevedo, the fifth of seven children -5 women and 2 men. She read her first book when she was only 6, Peter and Wendy by J.M. Barrie, determining her fascination for literature. A combination of observation, silence and imagination led Becerra to write at an early age her first stories in which she created other worlds. Throughout her adolescence she writes many poems that later will be part of his collection Alma Abierta (Open Soul).

At 17 she married Humberto Tellez. The result of this union is her first daughter Ángela (Cali, 1980).

Once married Becerra begins Economics, career that she abandons in order to pursue Communication and Advertising Design from which she graduated with honors in 1982. By that time, she was serving as Creative Director at a major international advertising agency.

In 1987, and after she is divorced, Becerra moved to Bogota where she continued her successful advertising career earning numerous awards for her creative work.

In 1988, after meeting the advertiser and writer Joaquín Lorente -who will become her husband and the father of her second daughter María (Barcelona 1993)-, Becerra traveled to Barcelona and for thirteen years hold the Creative Vice Presidency of one of the most important advertising agencies Spain.

In 2000, amidst her professional success, she abandoned her career as a publicist in order to devote herself entirely to her deepest passion: writing.

== Her work ==
Her first published work was Alma Abierta (Open Soul) (Planeta Group, 2001), a beautiful collection of poems that deals with the conflicts of the human being in maturity.

De los amores negados (Of Useless Loves) (2003), her first published novel (Villegas Editores 2003, Grupo Planeta 2004), marks the beginning of a very personal style described by literary critics as Magic Idealism. This is a story set in the imaginary city of Garmendia del Viento, where time seems to accompany the anxieties of Fiamma and Martin. This work received a warm reception from critics and readers in both Spain and Latin America, obtaining the Chicago Latin American Literary Award for Best Sentimental Novel.

The novel that won Becerra the most awards is El penúltimo sueño (The Penultimate Dream) (Planeta Group 2005, Villegas Editores, 2005). This book gets the Azorín Prize in 2005, the Prize for Best Colombian Fiction Book 2005 and the Latin American Literary Award in Chicago for Best Romantic Novel.

In 2007, she published Lo que le falta al tiempo (What Time is Missing) (Planeta Group, Villegas Editores), a novel of mystery and love that takes place in the Saint-Germain-des-Prés quarter in Paris. The two main characters of the story are Cadiz, a sexagenarian painter in the twilight of his career, and Mazarine, a student in love of her professor who keeps at home a secret that can change the course of art. For this book she received the Chicago Latin American Literary Award 2007 in two categories: Best Mystery Novel and Best Romantic Novel.

In 2008, Becerra published Amor con A (Villegas Editores) in Colombia, a collection of poems printed in a limited edition that gathers the beginning, life and death of love.

Ella que todo lo tuvo (She, who had it all) (Planeta Group, 2009), a psychological novel, is the story of a writer who suffers an accident and never writes again. In her intention to feel alive again, the writer creates an enigmatic character, a Donna di lágrima, a silent woman adored by men. No one will recognize her as the sad and lonely writer who restores old books in Florence and falls in love with a mysterious book keeper. This book got the Planeta-Casa de America Award in 2009.

In 2013 Becerra published Memorias de un sinvergüenza de siete suelas (Memoires of a Seven Soles Scoundrel) (Planeta Group), a novel full of emotional contrasts set in the most glamorous and traditional Seville. It is the story of Francisco Valiente, a casanova of the 21st century who dies suddenly. During his funeral, his wife and his lover will tell his scattered life; what they do not know is that the dead is also listening and will have much to say in that funeral.

Her most recent novel Algún día (Someday, today) (Planeta Group, 2019), is based on a real event that took place in 1920 in Colombia, and in which she tells the story of Betsabé Espinal, who at the age of twenty-three becomes the heroine of one of the first feminist strikes in history. The book has been awarded with the XXIV Fernando Lara Novel Award.

Ángela Becerra writes regularly for various international media and platforms. She has been guest speaker to events as relevant as Hay Festival.

She has also worked in other artistic fields, including photography, drawing, painting, sculpture, and theater. Some curators have commented on her work across these media.

== Books ==
- Alma Abierta (Open Soul), Collection of poems, 2001
- De Los Amores Negados (Of Useless Loves), 2004
- El penúltimo Sueño (The Penultimate Dream), 2005
- Lo que le falta al tiempo (What Time is Missing), 2007
- Alma abierta y otros poemas (Open Soul and Other Poems), 2008
- Amor con A, 2008
- Ella que todo lo tuvo (She, who had it all), 2009
- Memorias de un sinvergüenza de siete suelas (Memoirs of a Seven Soles Scoundrel), 2013
- Algún día (Someday, Today), 2019

== Awards ==
- De Los Amores Negados (Of Useless Loves), Latin American Literary Award 2004 at the BookExpo America (BEA) in the category of Best Romantic novel.
- El Penúltimo Sueño (The Penultimate Dream), Azorín Prize 2005.
- El Penúltimo Sueño (The Penultimate Dream), Latin American Literary Award 2005 at the BookExpo America (BEA) in the category of Best Romantic novel.
- El Penúltimo Sueño (The Penultimate Dream), Colombian Award for Best Fiction Book of 2005.
- Lo que le falta al tiempo (What Time is Missing), Latin American Literary Award 2008 at the BookExpo America (BEA) in the categories of Best Mystery novel and Best Romantic novel.
- Ella que todo lo tuvo (She, who had it all), Planeta-Casa de America Award 2009
- Algún día, hoy (Someday, today), Fernando Lara Novel Award 2019
