= Bussman =

Surname list

Bussman and Bussmann are surnames. Notable persons with these surnames include the following people:

- Gaëtan Bussmann (born 1991), French footballer
- Jane Bussmann (born 1969), English comedian and author
- Paul Bussman (born 1956), American politician
- Philip Bussmann (born 1969), German video artist
