= Jorge Edwards =

Chilean writer and diplomat (1931–2023)

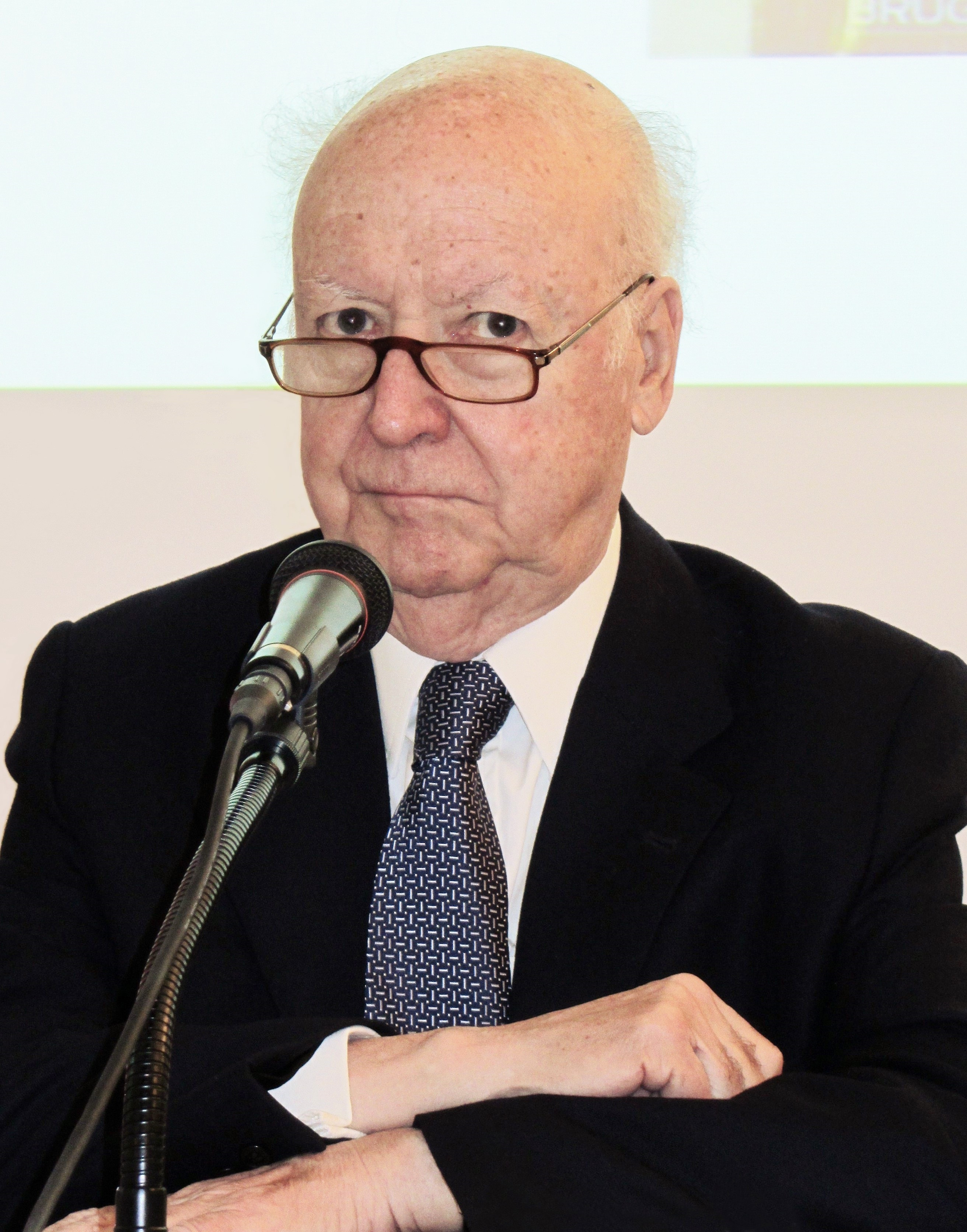
Edwards in 2012

Jorge Edwards Valdés (29 July 1931 – 17 March 2023) was a Chilean novelist, journalist and diplomat. He was the Chilean ambassador to France during the first Sebastián Piñera presidency.

== Life and career ==
Edwards attended law school at the Universidad de Chile.

During the presidency of Salvador Allende, Edwards reopened the Chilean embassy in Havana, Cuba, but only three months later, he decided to leave the island. From this episode he wrote what is perhaps his most famous work, Persona non grata (1971), which made him world famous, in which he criticized the Cuban government.

In June 1994, Edwards accepted the post of Ambassador for Chile before the United Nations Educational, Scientific and Cultural Organization (UNESCO), which has its headquarters in Paris, a city where Edwards resided for many years. Edwards lived in Santiago de Chile.

In 2008, his novel La Casa de Dostoievsky won the prestigious Premio Iberoamericano Planeta-Casa de América de Narrativa, one of the richest literary prizes in the world, worth $200,000.

In 2010, Edwards was granted Spanish citizenship by King Juan Carlos I of Spain.

== Awards and honors ==
- 1979 He entered the Academia Chilena de la Lengua
- 1994 Chilean National Prize for Literature
- 1999 Cervantes Prize
- 2000 Gabriela Mistral Order of Educational and Cultural Merit
- 2008 Premio Iberoamericano Planeta-Casa de América de Narrativa
- 2016 Grand Cross of the Civil Order of Alfonso X, the Wise

== Published works ==
Jorge Edwards was the youngest of the Edwards Valdés siblings (Carmen, Laura, Angélica, Luis Germán and himself); on their mother's side (Valdés) they descend directly from José Miguel Carrera.

=== Short stories ===
- El patio (1962)
- Gente de la ciudad (1961)
- Las máscaras (1967)
- Temas y variaciones (1969)
- Fantasmas de carne y hueso (1993)

=== Novels ===
- El peso de la noche (1965)
- Persona non grata (1973)
- Los convidados de piedra (1978)
- El museo de cera (1981)
- La mujer imaginaria (1985)
- El anfitrión (1987)
- El origen del mundo (1996)
- El sueño de la historia (2000)
- El inútil de la familia (2004), about Joaquín Edwards Bello.
- La Casa de Dostoievsky (2008)

=== Journalism ===
Jorge Edwards wrote for several newspapers in Chile and Latin America (La Nación, Buenos Aires) and Europe (Le Monde, Paris; and El País, Madrid). A large portion of his journalistic work has been collected in two books:

- El whisky de los poetas (1997)
- Diálogos en un tejado (2003)

=== Other works ===
He has also written essays and biographies:

- Desde la cola del dragón (1973)
- Adiós, poeta (about Pablo Neruda, 1990)
- Machado de Assís (about the Brazilian writer Joaquim Maria Machado de Assis, 2002)

== Teaching ==
Jorge Edwards taught a course at the University of Chicago during the autumn quarter of 2008. The course was titled My personal history of the boom.

== See also ==
- Edwards family
