= Casa de Isla Negra =

Home of Pablo Neruda

Coordinates: 33°26′34″S 71°41′02″W

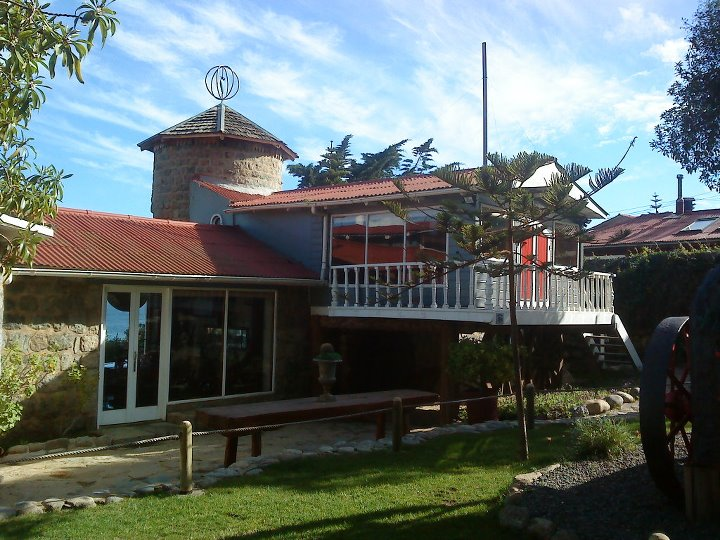
- House of Neruda in Isla Negra
- Location: Isla Negra, a coastal area of El Quisco commune, located about 45 km south of Valparaíso and 96 km west of Santiago

Casa de Isla Negra is one of the three houses owned by Chilean poet Pablo Neruda. It is located in Isla Negra, a coastal area within the commune of El Quisco, approximately 45 km south of Valparaíso and 96 km west of Santiago. The house served as Neruda's favorite residence, where he and his third wife, Matilde Urrutia, spent much of their time while in Chile.

Designed to reflect Neruda's fascination with the sea, the house resembles a ship, featuring low ceilings, creaking wooden floors, and narrow passageways. A dedicated collector, Neruda filled the house with various thematic collections, including bottles, ship figureheads, maps, ships in bottles, and an extensive shell collection housed in a room named Bajo el mar ("Under the Sea").

Neruda discovered the site during a visit to the area and requested an advance from his publisher, Carlos George-Nascimento, to purchase the property. Initially conceived as a meeting place for writers, the house was later dedicated to Nascimento in recognition of his support.

Neruda and Urrutia are buried at the site.

Despite its name, Isla Negra ("Black Island") is not an island but refers to a prominent dark rock formation off the coast. The region's intense winter storms inspired several of Neruda's poems, including Oda a la Tormenta ("Ode to the Storm").

Today, the house functions as a writer's home museum administered by the Pablo Neruda Foundation and is a popular tourist destination.

== See also ==
- La Chascona
