= Premio Iberoamericano Planeta-Casa de América de Narrativa =

Premio Iberoamericano Planeta-Casa de América de Narrativa was a Latin American Spanish language literary award. The winner received US$200,000 making it one of the richest literary prizes in the world. Beyond the large endowment, the award was also notable for the large number of books which were judged; in 2010 over 600 books entered the award, far surpassing the approximately 120 books which entered the Man Booker Prize, for example.

The first award was in 2007. It was given annually, generally in March, in a Latin American capital that was designated each year. The Prize was for an unpublished text written in Spanish, and had an endowment of $200,000 for the winner and $50,000 for the runner-up. The goal of the award was to promote Spanish-language fiction in all Latin American countries. The prize was sponsored by Grupo Planeta, one of the largest publishers in the world. The jury was composed of five members: one representative of each of the two convening entities (Editorial Planeta and Casa de América) and three personalities in the world of Latin American literature.

The 2010 Prize, that was to be given in Valparaíso, Chile, was suspended because of the 2010 Chile earthquake. In 2011 there was no runner-up prize. After 2012, the prize was canceled.

== Winners and runner(s)-up ==
- Blue Ribbon = winner
  - Runner(s)-up

2007 Bogotá, Colombia

- Pablo de Santis, El enigma de París
  - Alonso Cueto, El susurro de la mujer ballena

2008 Buenos Aires, Argentina

- Jorge Edwards, La Casa de Dostoievsky
  - Fernando Quiroz, Justos por pecadores

2009 Mexico City, Mexico

- Ángela Becerra, Ella, que todo lo tuvo
  - Pedro Ángel Palou, El dinero del diablo

2010 Valparaíso, Chile

- Suspended because of the 2010 Chile earthquake.

2011 Santiago, Chile

- Antonio Skármeta, Los días del arco iris
  - No runner-up.

2012 Madrid, Spain

- Jorge Volpi, La tejedora de sombras
  - 10 runners-up.
