= Nancy Fabiola Herrera =

Spanish mezzo-soprano opera singer

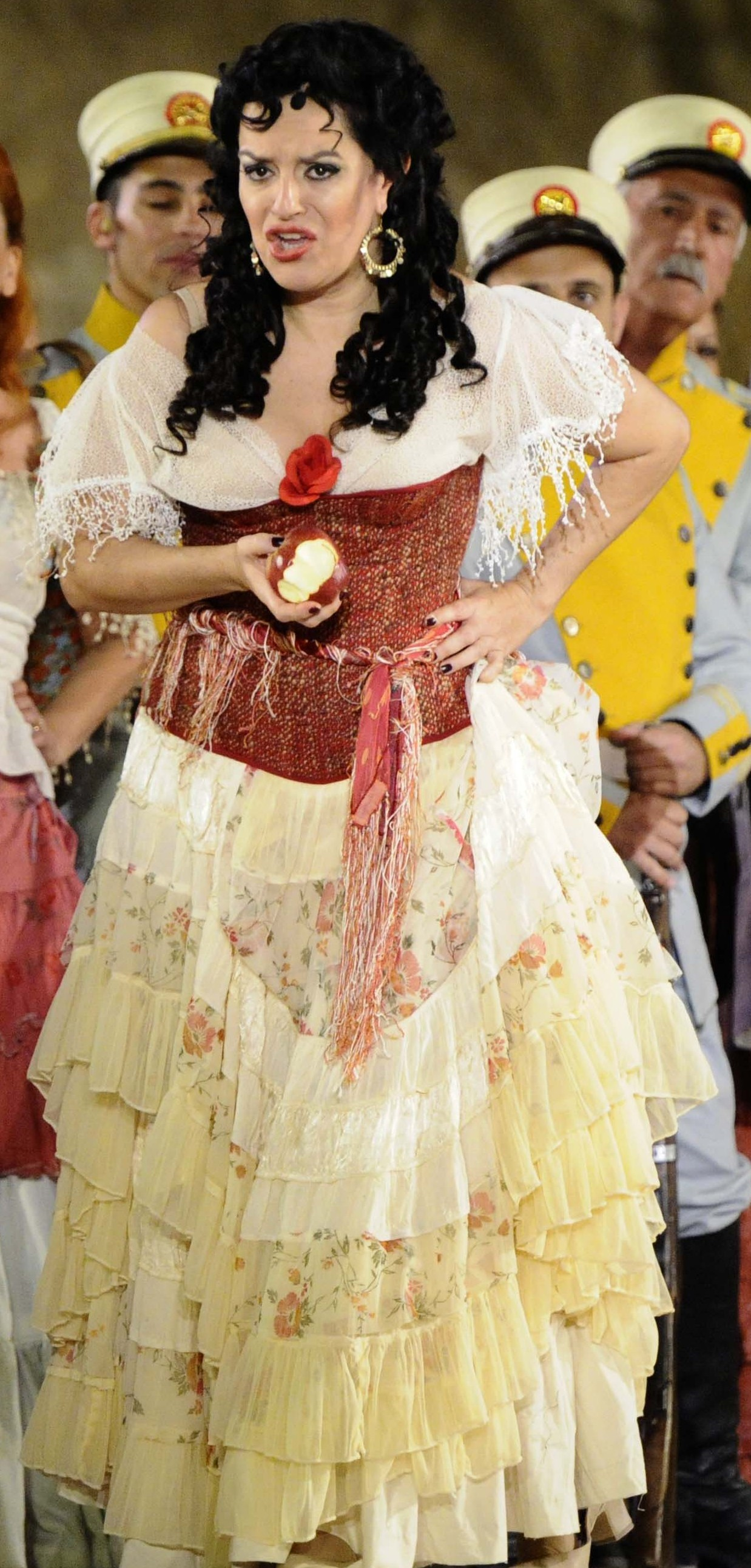
Nancy Fabiola Herrera as Carmen, Masada, June 2012

Nancy Fabiola Herrera is a Canarian mezzo-soprano opera singer. Born in Venezuela to Canarian parents, Herrera is the recipient of the "Best Zarzuela Singer of 2007" award presented by the Fundación Premios Liricos Teatro Campoamor, for her performance in Ruperto Chapí's La Bruja.

== Biography ==
In the summer of 2006, Herrera performed in a gala concert with Plácido Domingo in Puerto Rico, sang Maddalena in Rigoletto with the Metropolitan Opera in Central Park, Charlotte in Werther in Las Palmas de Gran Canaria and Luisa Fernanda opposite Plácido Domingo at the Teatro Real in Madrid. The DVD of Luisa Fernanda on Opus Arte, was awarded the Diapason d'Or.

During the 2007 and 2008 season, Herrera performed the Verdi's Requiem at the Palau de la Música Catalana in Barcelona. She sang a concert with the SODRE Symphony Orchestra of Montevideo, and Carmen at the Metropolitan Opera and The Royal Opera, Covent Garden.

Her repertory includes among others: Adalgisa (Norma), Romeo (I Capuleti e i Montecchi), Giulietta (Les contes d'Hoffmann), and Rosina (Il barbiere di Siviglia).

Prior career highlights include Carmen at the New National Theatre Tokyo, her debut at the Royal Opera as Suzuki in a production of Madama Butterfly, and her Italian debut at the Rome Opera as Carmen.

In 2009, Herrera sang in Las Palmas de Gran Canaria in the opera Roberto Devereux and debuted as Dalila from the opera Samson et Dalila in Manaos.

Herrera created the role of Donna Rosa in the world premiere of Daniel Catán's Il Postino at Los Angeles Opera in 2010.

As orchestral soloist and recitalist, Herrera has performed with the New York Festival of Song at the 92nd Street Y in New York City, and in recital at the Caramoor International Music Festival. She has sung de Falla's El amor brujo with the Washington Opera and the Montreal Symphony Orchestra under the direction of Charles Dutoit, Bach's St Matthew Passion with the Concordia College Orchestra, Berlioz' Les nuits d'été with the Gran Canaria Philharmonic Orchestra, and Mahler's Lieder eines fahrenden Gesellen with the North Netherlands Symphony Orchestra.

== Discography ==
Herrera has performed Dante by Granados for ASV Records, and was the featured soloist in Mahler's Symphony No. 3 with the Orquesta Filarmónica de Gran Canaria on the Arte Nova Label, and in Ricardo Llorca's Concierto Italiano on Columna Musica. She has recorded two versions of El amor brujo: one with Enrique Bátis for IMP Classics and a chamber version with the Cameristi di Trento e Verona for Naxos RecordsNaxos/Marco Polo.
