= Charles Castronovo =

American operatic tenor

- Castronovo in 2007
- Born: June 19, 1975 (age 50); Queens, New York
- Occupation: Opera singer (tenor)
- Years active: 1998–present
- Website: charlescastronovo.com

Charles Castronovo (born June 19, 1975) is an American operatic tenor. Castronovo was born to a Sicilian father and an Ecuadorian mother in Queens, New York, but grew up in Southern California. He attended California State University, Fullerton, for undergraduate studies in classical voice. During his time at the university, his talent came to the attention of William Vendice, the chorusmaster of the Los Angeles Opera, who promptly hired him as a chorister.

== Career ==
He began his professional career as a resident artist with the Los Angeles Opera. In the summer of 1998 he was a participant in San Francisco Opera's prestigious Merola Opera Program, and later joined the Metropolitan Opera's Lindemann Young Artist Development Program. After garnering much experience at the Metropolitan Opera, a series of significant role debuts soon followed such as Don Ottavio (Mozart's Don Giovanni), Ernesto (Donizetti's Don Pasquale), Fenton (Verdi's Falstaff), Ferrando in Mozart's Così fan tutte, Tamino (Mozart's Die Zauberflöte) and Alfredo in Verdi's La traviata.

He has sung at many of the world's leading opera houses such as: the Metropolitan Opera, Royal Opera, Covent Garden, Berlin State Opera, Vienna State Opera, San Francisco Opera, Salzburg Festival and Santa Fe Opera.

The 2006/07 season marked a series of role debuts such as Rodolfo in La bohème, Nadir (Les pêcheurs de perles), the Duke in Verdi's Rigoletto, and Mylio in Édouard Lalo's Le roi d'Ys. The 2007/08 season marked the role debut of Tom Rakewell (The Rake's Progress) at the Royal Opera, Covent Garden, and a return to Los Angeles Opera singing the role of Don Ottavio in Don Giovanni.

During the 2008/09 season, Castronovo debuted at the Washington National Opera, and performed his first Edgardo in Donizetti's Lucia di Lammermoor. In June 2009, Castronovo returned to San Francisco Opera as Alfredo opposite Anna Netrebko in Verdi's La traviata. Later, in November, he performed the title role in Faust for the Washington Concert Opera.

In the Fall of 2010, Castronovo debuted the role of Mario Ruoppolo in the world premiere of Daniel Catán's Il Postino at the Los Angeles Opera, along with Plácido Domingo, which was repeated in June 2011 at the Théâtre du Châtelet, Paris, again with Plácido Domingo.

In the Summer of 2011, Castronovo made his debut with the Aix-en-Provence Festival, appearing with French soprano Natalie Dessay in Verdi's La traviata. The 2011/12 season marked Castronovo's debut with the Lyric Opera of Chicago, singing the role of Tamino. In August 2011 he appeared at the Royal Albert Hall with the John Wilson Orchestra in the now celebrated series of Proms, dedicated to the great Hollywood musicals. In June 2012, Castronovo debuted the role of Nero in Monteverdi's L'incoronazione di Poppea with Teatro Real.

In the summer of 2014, he performed the title role in Hector Berlioz's La damnation de Faust, standing in for Ramón Vargas, at the Verbier Festival.

Recent musical projects include performances of traditional Neapolitan songs, with a small ensemble of guitar, accordion, percussion and bass.

== Recordings ==
- Leoncavallo: Pagliacci CD (2000), Decca Records
- Rossini: Stabat Mater CD (2001), Opus 111 Records
- • 10th Annual Opera Gala CD (2004), RCA Red Seal Records
- Berlin Opera Night: In Support of the German AIDS Foundation DVD (2004), EuroArts
- Mozart: La clemenza di Tito CD (2006), RCA Red Seal Records
- Mozart: Die Entführung aus dem Serail DVD (2007), Decca Records
- Mercadante: Virginia CD (2008), Opera Rara
- Gounod: Mireille (as Vincent). Paris Opera, Marc Minkowski (conductor). DVD (2009), FRA Musica
- Verdi: La traviata DVD (2012), Virgin Classics
