= La Chascona =

House in Chile

Coordinates: 33°25′52″S 70°38′4″W

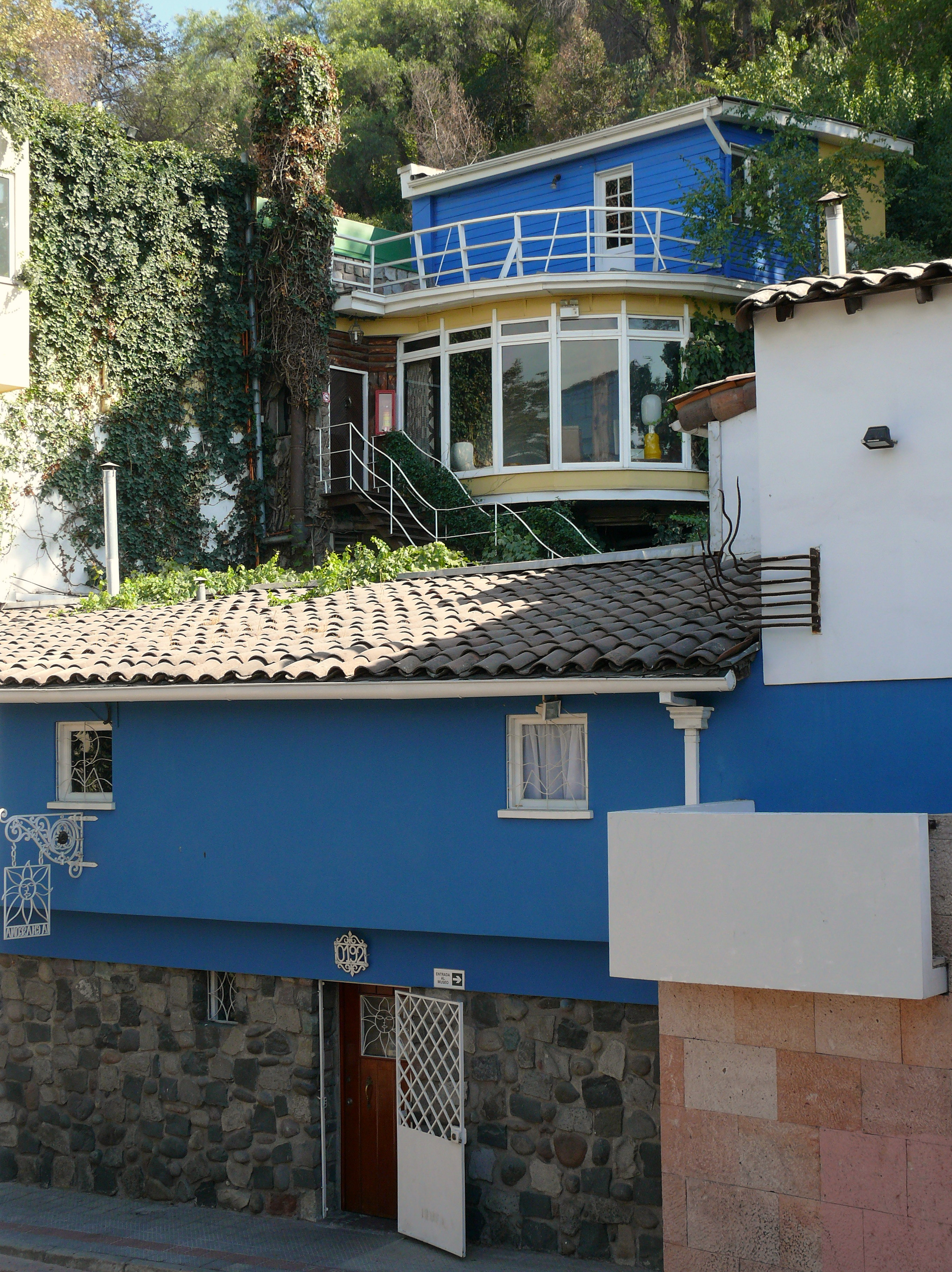
La Chascona, Neruda's house in Santiago

La Chascona is a house located in the Barrio Bellavista of Santiago, Chile. It was owned by the Chilean poet Pablo Neruda and is one of three houses associated with him. La Chascona is notable for its idiosyncratic architecture and interior design, which reflect Neruda's personal tastes, particularly his fascination with the sea. Today, it functions as a museum and is a popular tourist attraction.

Among the artworks in the house is a 1955 painting of Urrutia by Mexican artist Diego Rivera. The portrait presents Urrutia with two faces: one representing her public persona as a singer, and the other symbolizing her private life with Neruda. Hidden within the painting is the profile of Neruda's face concealed in her hair, alluding to the secrecy of their relationship.

== History ==
House of P Neruda at Santiago, Chile. Photo by Koushik Ranjan Das.

Construction of the house began in 1953, initially intended as a residence for Matilde Urrutia, Neruda's secret lover at the time.

Inside La Chascona. Photo by Koushik Ranjan Das.

The name "La Chascona" refers to Urrutia's curly red hair: "chascona" is a Chilean Spanish term of Quechua origin meaning "tangled hair" or "disheveled woman."

Inside La Chascona, Santiago, Chile

Urrutia later became Neruda's third wife. Following his death in 1973, during which the house sustained damage amid the military coup, she undertook its restoration.

Top of La Chascona. Photo by Koushik Ranjan Das

== Address ==
- Fernando Márquez de La Plata 192, Providencia, Santiago de Chile

== See also ==
- Casa de Isla Negra
