= Ardiente paciencia =

Book

The Postman
- Author: Antonio Skármeta
- Original title: Ardiente Paciencia
- Translator: Katherine Silver (English)
- Language: Spanish
- Publication date: 1985
- Publication place: Chile
- English publication date: 1987
- Pages: 118
- ISBN: 978-0-7868-8127-7
- OCLC: 32131425
- Dewey Decimal: 863 20
- LC Class: PQ8098.29.K3 A7313 1993

Ardiente paciencia, or El cartero de Neruda, is a 1985 novel by Antonio Skármeta. The novel was published in the English market under the title The Postman. It tells the story of Mario Jiménez, a fictional postman who befriends the real-life poet, politician and Nobel Prize winner Pablo Neruda, and is set in the years around the 1973 Chilean coup d'état.

The novel is based on the motion picture Burning Patience, of the same author, released in 1983, and it was turned into another movie in 1995 as Il Postino, directed by Michael Radford. It was also turned into an opera, Il Postino, by Daniel Catán, with Plácido Domingo portraying Pablo Neruda (premiered at the Los Angeles Opera, 2010).

== Synopsis ==
The story opens in June 1969 in the little village of Isla Negra, on the coast of Chile.

Mario Jiménez, a timid teenager, rejects the profession of his father, a fisherman, and instead takes a job as the local postman. Despite the entire village being illiterate, he does have one local to deliver to—the poet Pablo Neruda, who is living in exile. Mario worships Neruda as a hero and buys a volume of his poetry, timidly waiting for the moment to have it autographed.

After some time, Mario garners enough courage to strike up a conversation with Neruda, who is waiting for word about his candidacy for the Nobel Prize in Literature, and despite an awkward beginning, the two become good friends. Neruda fuels Mario's interest in poetry by teaching him the value of a metaphor, and the young postman begins practising this technique.

In the village, Mario meets Beatriz González, the daughter of the local barkeep, Rosa. Beatriz is curt and distant from Mario, and the young man finds his tongue tied whenever he tries to speak to her. With Neruda's help as a poet and an influential countryman, Mario overcomes his shy nature and he and Beatriz fall in love, much to the dismay of Rosa, who banishes Beatriz from seeing Mario.

Neruda's matters are complicated when he runs for candidacy as the president of Chile, but returns to the village when the United Left agrees to present socialist Salvador Allende as their candidate (Allende being eventually elected president). Neruda tries in vain to deter Rosa's negative attitude towards Mario.

Months later, when a clandestine meeting between Beatriz and Mario turns to intercourse, Beatriz discovers she is pregnant and the two are married, much to the dismay of Rosa. Neruda leaves to become the ambassador to France, and as he leaves, he gives Mario a leather-bound volume of his entire works.

National workers enter the village to install electricity, and Rosa's bar becomes a restaurant for the workers. As Neruda is gone, Mario is no longer needed as the postman, but takes on a job as the cook in the restaurant. Some months pass and Mario receives a package from Neruda containing a Sony tape recorder. Neruda is homesick (and it is implied otherwise ill), and asks his friend to record the sounds of his homeland to send back to him. Among other things, Mario records the tiny heartbeat of his yet unborn child.

Secretly, Mario has saved enough money to purchase a ticket to visit Neruda in France, but matters change when his son is born and the money is spent on the child as he grows. It is announced that Neruda has won the Nobel Prize and Mario celebrates with the rest of the village by throwing a party at Rosa's restaurant.

Neruda returns some time later, quite ill. Mario considers sending a poem into a contest for the cultural magazine La Quinta Rueda, and seeks Neruda's help with the work. Neruda, unbeknownst to Mario, however, is on his death bed. Unable to see Neruda, Mario decides to send in a pencil sketch of his son.

The dictatorship reaches Isla Negra, and Mario takes up his job as postman in order to see Neruda. As helicopters circle the area, Mario sneaks into Neruda's house, to find the poet dying in his bed. Mario reads to Neruda telegrams that he has received offering the poet sanctuary, but it is too late—Neruda knows he is dying and gives his last words, a poem, to Mario. Neruda is taken away in an ambulance and dies in the hospital several days later.

Shortly after Neruda's death, Mario is approached by Labbé, the local right-wing general. The general asks Mario to come with him for some routine questioning. As Mario gets into the car, he overhears on the radio that several subversive magazines have been taken over by coup forces, including La Quinta Rueda.

In an epilogue, the author talks to one of the editors of La Quinta Rueda. The editor remembers who the winner would have been—a poem by Jorge Teillier. When the author asks about Mario's sketch, the editor has no memory of it. The author ends the story by sipping a cup of bitter coffee.
