= Los versos del capitán =

1952 book by Pablo Neruda

First edition

Los versos del capitán is a book by the Chilean poet Pablo Neruda, winner of the Nobel Prize in Literature in 1971. It was published for the first time anonymously in Italy in 1952 by his friend Paolo Ricci. The book with his own name in it was first published in Chile, in 1963, with a note written by Neruda explaining why he used anonymity. It is considered that "Los versos del capitan" were dedicated to Neruda's lover Matilde Urrutia, whom he married a few years later.

== Structure ==
The book is divided into five groups of short poems and ends with two longer poems, entitled "Epitalamio" and "La carta en el camino."

El amor

- En ti la tierra
- La reina
- El alfarero
- 8 de septiembre
- Tus pies
- Tus manos
- Tu risa
- El inconstante
- La noche en la isla
- El viento en la isla
- La infinita
- Bella
- La rama robada
- El hijo
- La tierra
- Ausencia

El deseo

- El tigre
- El cóndor
- El insecto

Las furias

- El amor
- Siempre
- El desvío
- La pregunta
- La pródiga
- El daño
- El pozo
- El sueño
- Si tú me olvidas
- El olvido
- Las muchachas
- Tú venías

Las vidas

- El monto y el río
- La pobreza
- Las vidas
- La bandera
- El amor del soldado
- No sólo el fuego
- La muerta
- Pequeña América

Oda y germinaciones

- I
- II
- III
- IV
- V
- VI

Epitalamio
La carta en el camino
