= Betsabé Espinal =

Colombian activist (1896–1932)

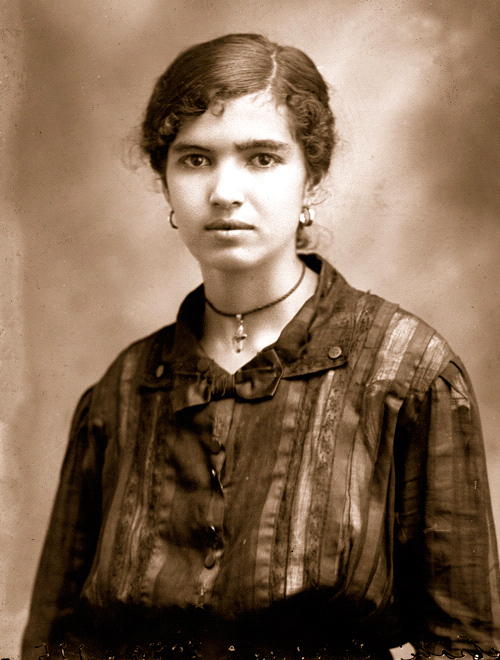
- Born: 1896; Bello, Colombia
- Died: 16 November 1932; Medellín
- Other names: Espinosa, Espinoza
- Parent: Celsa Espinal

Betsabé Espinal (1896 – 16 November 1932), also erroneously known as Betsabé Espinosa or Espinoza, was a Colombian labor rights activist and leader of a 1920 workers' strike against a fabric factory in Bello, Colombia. Although not the first strike in Colombian history, it was the first strike led by women. The strike was considered to have made a significant impact on the rights of female workers thereafter.

There are few details about her life before and after the strike. A school in Barranquilla, Colombia was named after her called I.E.D. Betsabé Espinosa.

== 1920 strike ==
The 1920 Bello strike was the first strike in Colombia with the official label of huelga ("strike", as opposed to the word paro used in previous strikes). Prior to the strike, female laborers as young as eight years old worked at the factory, a typical work day was over 12 hours, and the women were forced to work barefoot. With Espinal as the leader, over 400 weavers stopped working. The strike lasted from February 12 to March 4 and ended when the owner of the fabric factory agreed to a 40% increase in salary, the expulsion of male foremen who were accused of sexual harassment of the female workers, and a nine hour workday. The parish priest of Bello and the archbishop of Medellín acted as mediators for the deal.

During the time of the strike, several liberal and socialist newspapers wrote about and interviewed Espinal extensively, turning her into a symbolic figure of the working woman.

The owner of the fabric factory, Emilio Restrepo Callejas, fired several workers as a result of the strike, including Betsabé.

=== Aftermath ===
In 1929, following the example in Bello, the 186 workers of the Rosellón Factory of Envigado went on a strike for higher wages and the expulsion of certain abusive administrators.

After the strike in Bello, Espinal moved to Medellín to seek work. She died at 36 years old from accidental electrocution.
