= Cristina Gallardo-Domâs =

Chilean-born Spanish soprano

Cristina Lourdes Gallardo-Domâs Tudezca is a Chilean-born soprano who frequently performs in operas by Puccini. She lives in Spain.

== Early life and education ==
Gallardo-Domâs was born in Santiago, Chile. She studied at the Juilliard School in New York, although she did not complete the course.

== Career ==
Gallardo-Domâs made her debut as Madama Butterfly in 1990 at the Municipal Theatre of Santiago and, three years later, began performing in opera houses in Europe, making her La Scala debut in 1993 in La Rondine.

Gallardo-Domâs' many Puccini performances include: Turandot and Madama Butterfly at the Metropolitan Opera, Vienna State Opera, and Royal Opera House; La bohème at the Metropolitan Opera, La Scala, and Paris Opéra; Manon Lescaut at the Zurich Opera and Los Angeles Opera; Simon Boccanegra (by Verdi) at Vienna State Opera (televised), Bavarian State Opera, and the Palau de les Arts Reina Sofia in Valencia; and Suor Angelica at Amsterdam's Concertgebouw and Teatro Colón.

Gallardo-Domâs is known for her Madama Butterfly and was featured in the heavily promoted new production of this work that opened the 2006/2007 season at the Metropolitan Opera and marked the beginning of Peter Gelb's tenure as General Manager of the Met. According to her website, she was personally chosen by the director, Anthony Minghella, for this role, having successfully performed it previously at the Royal Opera.

In 2010 Gallardo-Domâs created the role of Matilde Neruda in the Los Angeles world premiere of Daniel Catán's Il Postino.

== Reception ==
In 1993, the Hartford Courant praised her "radiant, melting performance as the frail seamstress Mimi" in the Puccini opera La bohème, predicting that she would have a "long and distinguished" career:

There is strength and fragility to her portrayal. Vocally, soared to the rafters when called upon to, but she also showed, particularly in the final act, a special tenderness and subtlety, as her star-crossed character expired from that time-honored if somewhat vague opera affliction called consumption.

In its critique of her 2001 solo album Bel Sogno, The Gramophone wrote that "Gallardo-Domâs‚ in a wide-ranging recital‚ proves that she need not fear comparison with any of her distinguished contemporaries in the field and little from the best of her predecessors. By dint of her unimpeachable musicality‚ the sheer beauty of her truly Italianate tone and her exemplary way with words‚ she makes every track on this generously filled recital an individual experience to treasure – and of how few singers can that be said?"

== Honors ==
In 2007, Gallardo-Domâs received an Honorary Doctorate from the Andrés Bello National University, the first woman to receive this honor. She has been recognized with top cultural honors in Chile: the Gabriela Mistral Award and the Gran Cruz Apostol Santiago. She has also won top prizes in singing competitions.

In January 2020, Gallardo-Domâs was the president of the judging panel at "Laguna Mágica" Opera Festival in San Pedro de la Paz, Chile.

== Discography ==
- 2001 – Verdi Aida, Vienna Philharmonic, Harnoncourt
- 2001 — Bel Sogno: Italian Arias and Scenes
- 2010 – Puccini: Edgar – Dramma Lirico in Tre Atti (Deluxe Edition)
- 2013 – Lela: Canciónes gallegas
- 2017 – Pontes de Amor

== Personal life ==
Gallardo-Domâs lives in the Canary Islands, Spain, with her husband, a Spanish lawyer, and her two children.
