= Isla Negra =

Coastal area in El Quisco, Chile

Coordinates: 33°26′32″S 71°41′07″W

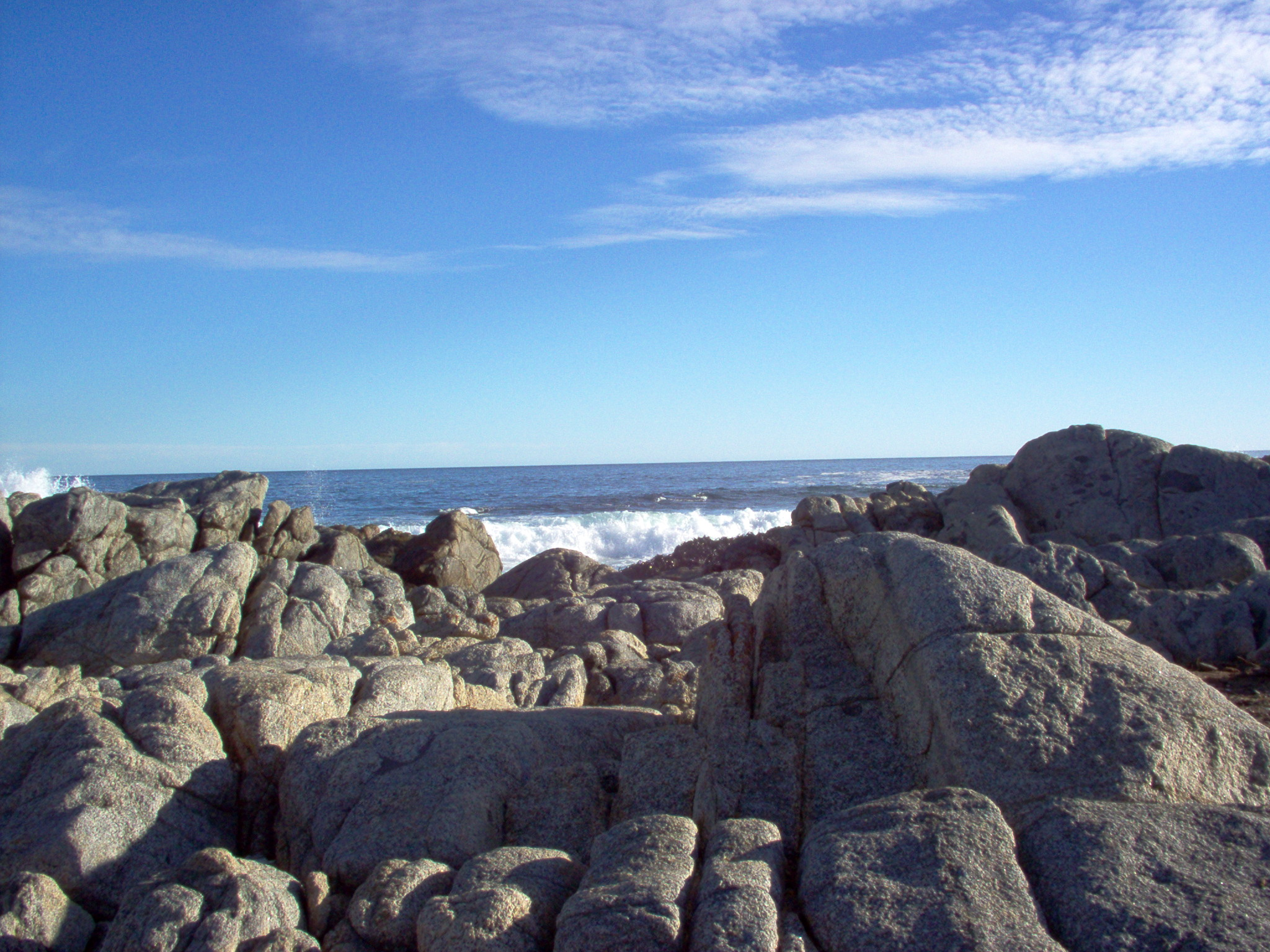
Rocky shoreline at Isla Negra, in the Valparaíso Region, Chile

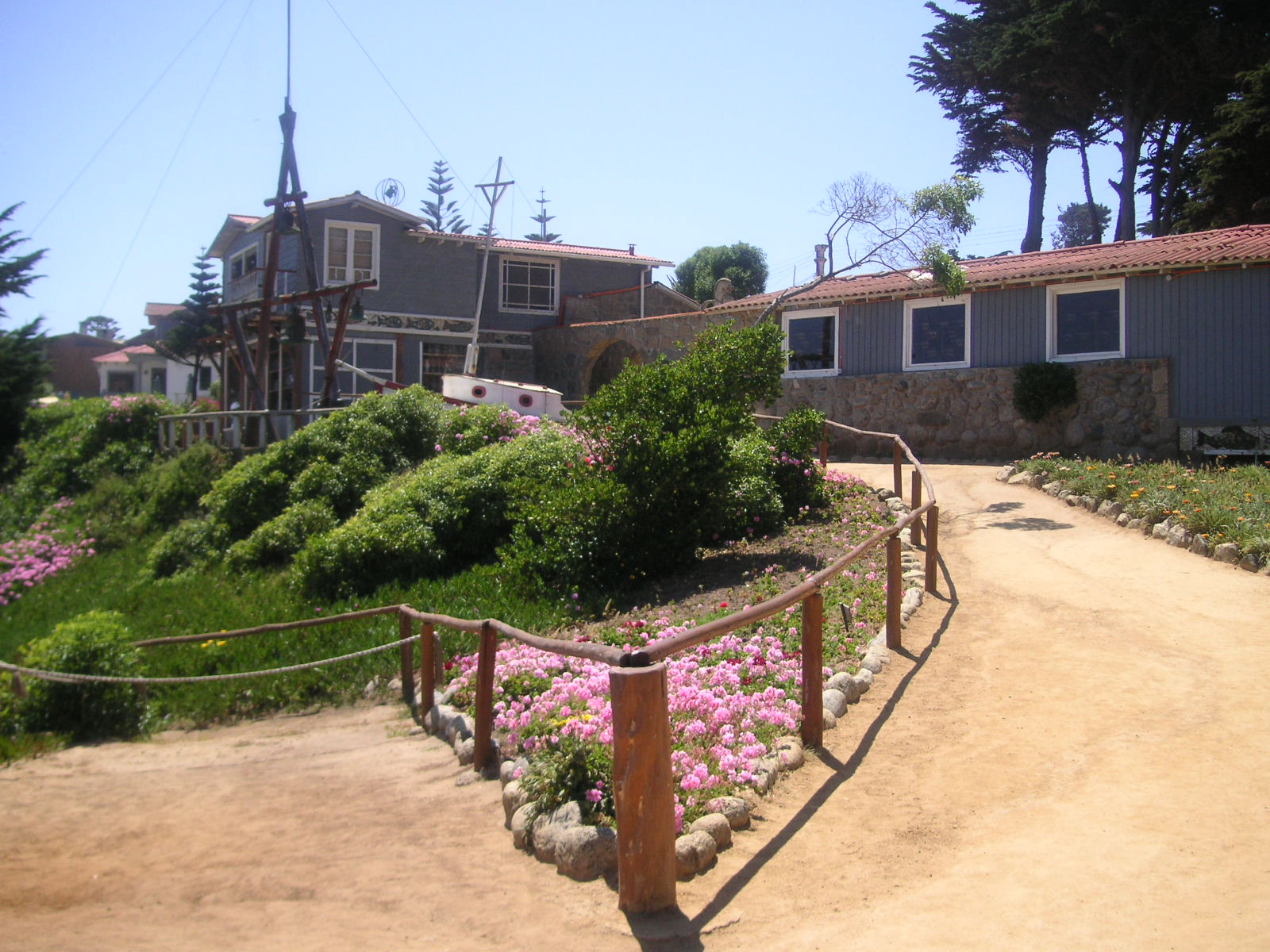
Casa de Isla Negra house museum of Pablo Neruda, in Isla Negra

Isla Negra is a coastal area in El Quisco commune in central Chile, some 45 km (70 km by road) south of Valparaíso and 96 km (110 km by road) west of Santiago.

== Pablo Neruda ==
Isla Negra is best known as the residence of Chilean poet Pablo Neruda, who lived there at Casa de Isla Negra (with long periods of travel and exile) from 1939 until his death in 1973. The area was named by Neruda, after the dark outcrop of rocks just offshore. It literally means "black island" in Spanish. The Casa de Isla Negra is now a museum.

Every year on Neruda's birthday (12 July), there are celebrations, both at the house and in the artisans' square nearby. There are poetry readings, music and picnics on the beach.

== Community ==
Although most tourists come in buses to see Neruda's house, there is also a community of writers, artists and artisans who live in Isla Negra and the surrounding area. It is a favourite holiday spot for middle-class families from Santiago.

As of 2024 the group Bordadoras de Isla Negra - its creation encouraged by Eduardo Martinez Bonati - were exhibited at the Venice Biennale.[3] Their colorful embroidery style is intended to document life on this island.
