= Philip Bußmann =

German video artist

Philip Bussmann
- Born: 23 8 1969
- Occupation: Video artist

Philip Bussmann (born 23 August 1969) is a German video artist working for international dance and theater productions since 1995.

== Life and work ==
After studying set and costume design with Professor Jürgen Rose at Stuttgart State Academy of Fine Arts he moved to New York City. There he worked for eight years as video and graphic designer for the internationally renowned Wooster Group, which is known for its media theater performances under the direction of Elizabeth LeCompte. In Germany he worked at Deutsches Schauspielhaus Hamburg, at Schauspielhaus Bochum, for the Ruhrtriennale, at Schauspiel Frankfurt, with William Forsythe for Ballett Frankfurt, with Wanda Golonka and with Sasha Waltz at Schaubühne Berlin, and at Stuttgart State Opera.

Philip Bussmann currently lives in Frankfurt am Main.
