= Antonio Skármeta =

Chilean writer (1940–2024)

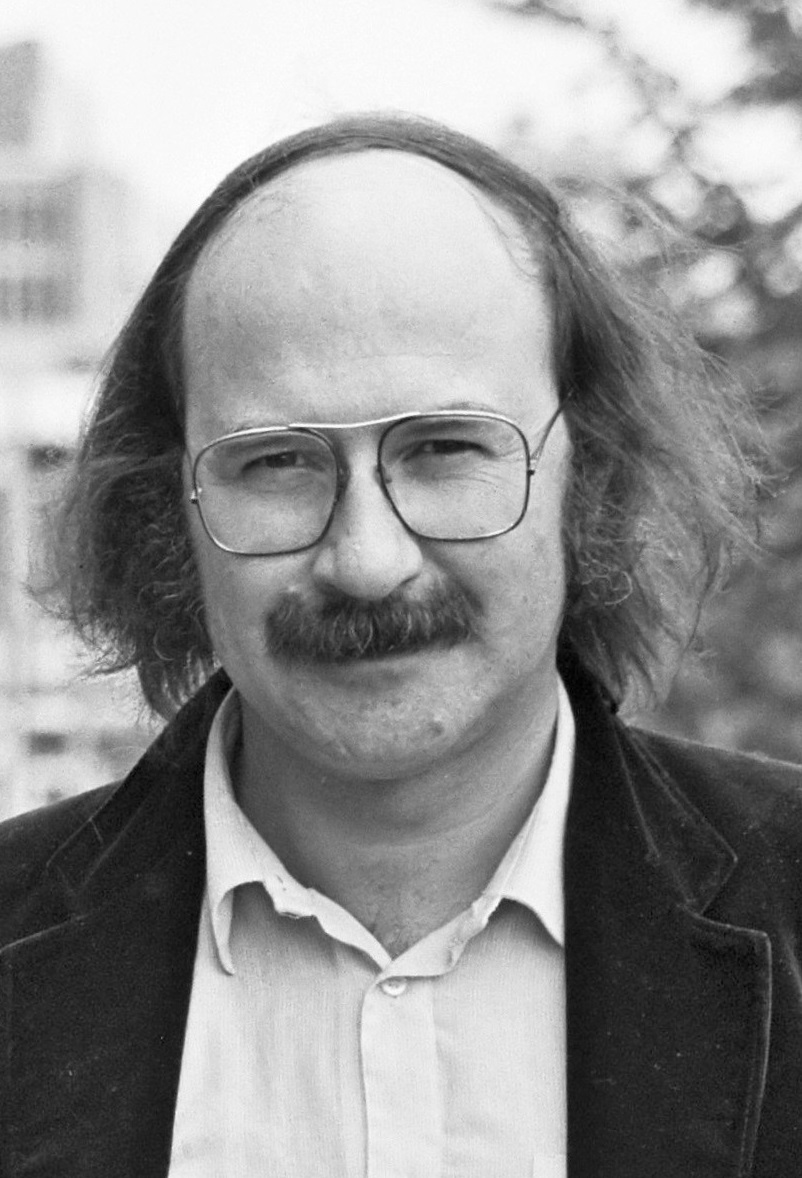
- Skármeta in 1981
- Born: Esteban Antonio Skármeta Vranicic; November 7, 1940; Antofagasta, Chile
- Died: October 15, 2024 (aged 83); Santiago, Chile
- Education: University of Chile
- Occupations: Writer, scriptwriter, director
- Spouse(s): Cecilia Boisier (div.); Nora María Preperski
- Children: Beltrán Skármeta Boisier; Gabriel Skármeta Boisier; Fabián Skármeta Preperski
- Writing career
- Language: Spanish
- Genre: Novel
- Notable work: Ardiente paciencia (1985)
- Notable awards: Prix Médicis étranger (2001); Premio Iberoamericano Planeta-Casa de América de Narrativa (2011); National Prize for Literature (2014)

Esteban Antonio Skármeta Vranicic (Note: Spanish: [anˈtonjo esˈkaɾmeta]) (November 7, 1940 – October 15, 2024) was a Chilean writer, screenwriter, and director. His novel Ardiente paciencia was the basis for the film Il Postino. In Chile, he was popularly known for hosting a television show on literature and the arts. He served as Chile's ambassador to Germany from 2000 to 2003. In 2014, he was awarded the Chilean National Literature Prize.

== Early life and education ==
Skármeta was born in Antofagasta to a family of Croatian descent, originating from the Adriatic island of Brač, Dalmatia. He studied at the Instituto Nacional public school in Santiago, Chile, and pursued higher education in philosophy and literature both in Chile and at Columbia University in New York.

== Literary and film career ==
Skármeta gained international recognition for his 1985 novel Ardiente paciencia ("Burning Patience"), which later inspired the 1994 Academy Award-winning film Il Postino (The Postman). In later editions, the novel was retitled El cartero de Neruda (Neruda's Postman). His literary works have been translated into nearly thirty languages and have received numerous accolades.

In addition to writing novels, Skármeta had a passion for cinema. He wrote several screenplays and directed at least two films. His work extended beyond literature, contributing to both the film industry and Chilean television.

Skármeta taught literature at the University of Chile from 1967 until 1973. Following the military coup that brought General Augusto Pinochet to power, he left Chile, living in Buenos Aires and later West Berlin.

== Return to Chile and later work ==
Skármeta returned to Chile in 1989, after the end of Pinochet's dictatorship, with the intention of promoting political and cultural freedom. He became the host of a television program on literature and the arts, which garnered a significant following, regularly attracting over a million viewers.

From 2000 to 2003, Skármeta served as the Chilean ambassador to Germany. Throughout his career, he remained connected to education, teaching classes at Colorado College, both in Santiago and Colorado Springs.

== Awards and adaptations ==
In 2011, Skármeta's novel Los días del arco iris won the Premio Iberoamericano Planeta-Casa de América de Narrativa, one of the world's most lucrative literary awards. His unpublished play El Plebiscito was the basis for Pablo Larraín's 2012 film No.

Skármeta's 2010 novel Un padre de película inspired the Brazilian film O Filme da Minha Vida, directed by Selton Mello, a project that Skármeta himself had suggested.

== Death ==
Skármeta died on October 15, 2024, at the age of 83.

== Works ==
- El entusiasmo, 1967.
- Desnudo en el tejado, 1969.
- Tiro libre, 1973.
- Soñé que la nieve ardía, 1975.
- Novios solitarios, 1975.
- No paso nada, 1980.
- La insurrección, 1982.
- Ardiente paciencia, 1985.
- El cartero de Neruda, 1985.
- Matchball, 1989.
- La composición, 1998.
- La boda del poeta, 1999.
- La chica del trombón, 2001.
- El baile de la Victoria, 2003.
- Los días del arco iris, 2010.
- Libertad de Movimiento, 2016.
