= Matilde Urrutia =

Chilean singer and wife of poet Pablo Neruda (1912–1985)

Matilde Urrutia Cerda (5 May 1912 – 5 January 1985) was the third wife of Chilean poet Pablo Neruda, from 1966 until he died in 1973. They met in Santiago, Chile in 1946, when she was working as a physical therapist in Chile. She was the first woman in Latin America to work as a pediatric therapist. Urrutia was the inspiration behind Neruda's later love poems beginning with Los Versos del Capitan in 1951, which the poet withheld publication until 1961 to spare the feelings of his previous wife; as well as 100 Love Sonnets which includes a beautiful dedication to her.

Neruda built a house in Santiago called "La Chascona", for Urrutia, which served as a secret love den for the two, as news that Neruda was having an affair would not have been received well by the Chilean public. In his house, there is a portrait of Urrutia painted by Diego Rivera, given to her by Neruda depicting a two-faced Urrutia with her famously long, bright red hair. What is remarkable about this painting is that one face depicts Urrutia as the singer the public knew, and the other depicts the lover Neruda knew. The painting also has a hidden image; the profile view of Neruda's face is hidden in her hair, showing their continuous secret relationship.

After Neruda's death, Urrutia edited for publication his memoir, Confieso que he vivido ("I confess that I have lived"). This and other activities brought her into conflict with the government of Augusto Pinochet, which tried to suppress the memory of Neruda, an outspoken communist, from the collective consciousness.

Her own memoir, My Life with Pablo Neruda, ISBN 0-8047-5009-2, was published posthumously in 1986.
