= Andrés Celis =

Chilean politician

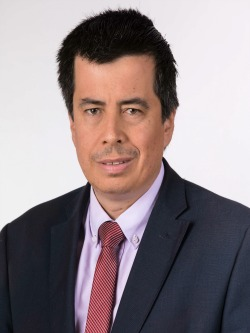

Member of the Chamber of Deputies
- Incumbent
- Assumed office 11 March 2018
- Preceded by: District created
- Constituency: District 7

Councillor of Viña del Mar
- In office 6 December 2000 – 6 December 2016

Personal details
- Born: 8 April 1975 (age 51) Vina del Mar, Chile
- Party: National Renewal
- Parent(s): Raúl Celis Cornejo; Cecilia Montt Pascal
- Relatives: Raúl (brother)
- Education: Adolfo Ibáñez University (LL.B)
- Occupation: Politician
- Profession: Lawyer

Andrés Celis Montt (born 8 April 1975) is a Chilean lawyer and politician.

He was municipal councillor of Viña del Mar from 2000 to 2016. On 21 November 2019, he was re-elected in his position of deputy.

== Biography ==
He was born in Viña del Mar on 8 April 1975. He is the son of Raúl Celis Cornejo—former intendant of the Valparaíso Region, councillor, mayor of Viña del Mar, and former rector of the University of Valparaíso—and María Cecilia Montt Pascal.

He is the great-grandson of former Radical Party deputy and senator Víctor R. Celis, and the brother of former intendant of the Valparaíso Region and Constitutional Convention member for the 7th District, Raúl Celis Montt.

He completed his primary and secondary education at the Colegio de los Padres Franceses in Viña del Mar. He later enrolled in the School of Law at Adolfo Ibáñez University, from which he graduated in 1999. His graduation thesis was titled “Fundamental Issues on Political Parties.” He completed his professional internship at the National Service for Minors (SENAME).

== Political career ==
He began his political involvement while studying at the Colegio de los Padres Franceses in Viña del Mar and later served as president of the student council of the School of Law at Adolfo Ibáñez University. He joined National Renewal at the age of 18.

In the municipal elections of 29 October 2000, he was elected for the first time as a councillor of the Municipality of Viña del Mar, obtaining 2,631 votes, equivalent to 1.91% of the total votes cast. He subsequently served four consecutive terms as municipal councillor.

During his tenure as councillor, he served on several municipal bodies, including the Organizing Committee of the Viña del Mar International Song Festival, the Citizen Security and Oversight Committee, and the Public Works and Coastal Development Committee.

On 18 November 2016, he resigned from the Municipal Council of Viña del Mar in order to run for the Chamber of Deputies of Chile for the 7th District of the Valparaíso Region.

In August 2017, he formally registered his candidacy for the Chamber of Deputies for the 7th District—comprising the communes of Valparaíso, Juan Fernández, Easter Island, Viña del Mar, Concón, San Antonio, Santo Domingo, Cartagena, El Tabo, El Quisco, Algarrobo, and Casablanca—within the Chile Vamos coalition and representing National Renewal. In the parliamentary elections of 19 November 2017, he was elected as a deputy, obtaining 21,285 votes, corresponding to 6.61% of the votes cast.

In August 2021, he ran for re-election in the 7th District, representing National Renewal within the Chile Podemos Más coalition, for the 2022–2026 term. On 21 November 2021, he was re-elected as a deputy for the same district with 18,978 votes, equivalent to 5.32% of the valid votes cast.
