= María José Hoffmann =

Chilean politician

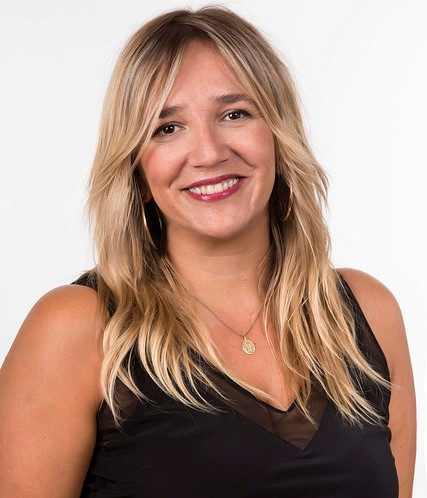

Member of the Chamber of Deputies of Chile
- In office 11 March 2018 – 11 March 2022
- Preceded by: Creation of the district
- Constituency: District 7
- In office 11 March 2010 – 11 March 2018
- Preceded by: Edmundo Eluchans
- Succeeded by: Dissolution of the district
- Constituency: 15th District (Algarrobo, Cartagena, Casablanca, El Quisco, El Tabo, San Antonio and Santo Domingo, Valparaíso)

Personal details
- Born: 28 December 1976 (age 49) Santiago, Chile
- Party: Independent Democratic Union
- Spouse: Gonzalo Müller
- Children: Three
- Education: Central University of Chile (BA); Francisco de Vitoria University (MA); University for Development (PhD)
- Profession: Public administrator

María José Hoffmann Opazo (born 28 December 1976) is a Chilean politician who currently serves as Secretary-General of the Independent Democratic Union. She is a Member of the Chamber of Deputies of Chile.

== Early life ==
Daughter of Fernando Hoffmann Álamos and María Eugenia Opazo Villaseca, she was born in Santiago de Chile on 28 December 1976. Her father was a second lieutenant in the army and received training from the Western Hemisphere Institute for Security Cooperation (1974).

She is married to Gonzalo Müller, a lawyer and political analyst known to being an advisor of Joaquín Lavín in the Municipality of Las Condes.

== Political career ==
She entered politics as a university student, when she joined the Independent Democratic Union Youth. Similarly, she was the first woman to take over as UDI Youth national president.

From 2000 to 2004, she was a councilor for the Municipality of Recoleta. From 2003 to 2004, Hoffmann was executive secretary of the Jaime Guzmán Pro Memorial Corporation.

From 2004 and 2008, now she was elected councilor for the Municipality of Conchalí. During the same period she assumed the national presidency of the councilors of her party. Also, from 2005 to 2008, she was vice president of councilors of the Chilean Association of Municipalities (ASCHM).

In December 2009, Hoffmann was elected deputy for the 15th district representing the communes of Algarrobo, Cartagena, Casablanca, El Quisco, El Tabo, San Antonio and Santo Domingo, Valparaíso in the Valparaíso Region for the 2010−2014 legislative period. In the chamber, Hoffmann was a member of the permanent commissions of Interior Government and Regionalization, Education, Human Rights, Nationality and Citizenship. Likewise, she was part of the UDI parliamentary committee.

In the 2013 parliamentary elections, she was re-elected in her district for the 2014−2018 period. Now Hoffmann was a member of the Permanent Commissions of Culture, Arts and Communications; Education; Social Development, Overcoming Poverty and Planning; and Science and Technology.

On 26 November 2014, Hoffmann questioned Nicolás Eyzaguirre, the Minister of Education with almost 20 questions, in the midst of demonstrations in the congress. However, she was criticized for her role in the interpellation, both by pro-government parliamentarians and by her coalition peers.

In November 2017, Hoffmann was elected deputy for the new District 7 of the Valparaíso Region for the legislative period 2018−2022; she obtained the first majority of votes. Until 2022, she integrated the permanent commissions of Sciences and Technologies; Education; and Environment and Natural Resources.

In the 2021 Chilean general election, Hofmann was a promoter by default of the candidacy of José Antonio Kast despite her party officially supported to Sebastián Sichel.
