= Jorge Brito Hasbún =

Chilean politician

Jorge Brito
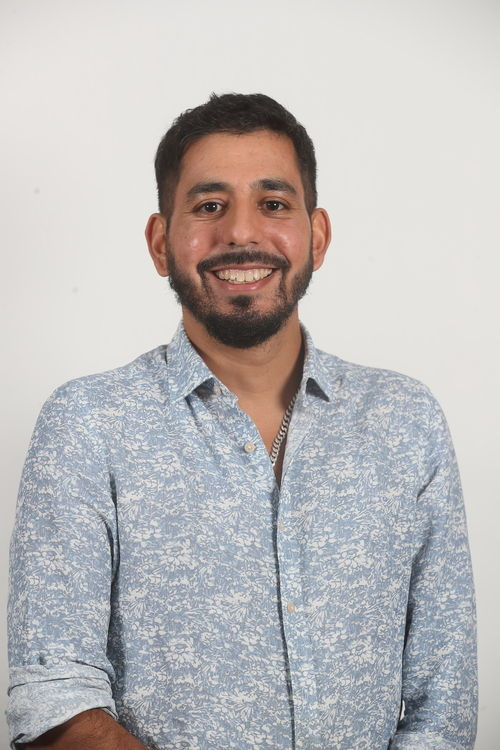

Member of the Chamber of Deputies
- Incumbent
- Assumed office 11 March 2018
- Preceded by: District created
- Constituency: District 7

Personal details
- Born: 12 January 1990 (age 36) Talca, Chile
- Party: Broad Front (since 2024)
- Other political affiliations: Democratic Revolution (2012–2024)
- Parent(s): Jorge Brito Obereque; Claudia Hasbún
- Education: Federico Santa María Technical University (B.Sc)
- Occupation: Politician
- Profession: Industrial engineer

Jorge Elías Brito Hasbún (born 12 January 1990) is a Chilean politician who currently serves as a member of the Chamber of Deputies of his country.

== Biography ==
He was born in Talca on 12 January 1990. He is the son of Jorge Miguel Brito Obreque and Claudia Cecilia Hasbún Atala. He is single and has no children.

He completed his primary and secondary education at Colegio La Salle in Talca. From 2003 to 2004, he represented Chile at the Young Science Congress in Moscow (2003), Lima, and Fortaleza (2004).

In 2008, he began studies in Industrial Civil Engineering at the Federico Santa María Technical University (UTSFM) in Valparaíso, graduating with highest honors in 2015. He is currently a candidate for a Master’s degree in Public Management and Public Policy at the University of Chile.

During his university studies, he served as an academic assistant in the field of economics and was a member of the University Superior Council, Academic Council, and Ethics Tribunal at his institution.

In his professional career, he has worked as a lecturer in the Department of Commercial Engineering at the UTFSM and as coordinator of CORFO projects supporting entrepreneurship and innovation. He also served as thesis advisor in degree completion processes at the same university.

In 2015, together with other partners, he developed an entrepreneurial venture focused on promoting energy efficiency and installing photovoltaic panels, contributing to the expansion of renewable energy in central Chile.

He also participated in the creation of the Municipal Area of the Observatory of Fiscal Spending in Chile, serving as a researcher and member of the Network of Observers.

== Political career ==
He began his political involvement by leading the 2006 "Penguin Revolution" at his school. Later, during his university years, he served as a student leader in his academic program in 2010.

From 2011 to 2012, he was president of the Federation of Students of the Federico Santa María Technical University (FEUTFSM), playing a role in the 2011 student movement. During this period, he was also a member of the Confederation of Students of Chile (CONFECh).

He was a founder and member of Revolución Democrática (RD) in the Valparaíso Region since 2012. In 2013, he served as National Coordinator of the Student Front and as a member of the Human Rights Commission of the party.

In 2013, he launched the «End to Military Justice» campaign, aimed at restricting the jurisdiction of Military Courts over civilians. The campaign gathered more than 13,000 signatures. In this process, he collaborated in the creation of the first Association of Victims of Police Violence and Abuse and appeared before the Human Rights Commission of the Chamber of Deputies on 8 June 2016.

In 2014, he participated in the Pacto Urbano La Matriz (PULM) and became involved in the citizen movement Alcaldía Ciudadana, which organized the first citizen primaries and later contributed to the election of Jorge Sharp as mayor of Valparaíso in the municipal elections held on 23 October 2016.

In August 2017, he registered his candidacy for the Chamber of Deputies for District No. 7, comprising the communes of Valparaíso, Juan Fernández, Easter Island, Viña del Mar, Concón, San Antonio, Santo Domingo, Cartagena, El Tabo, El Quisco, Algarrobo, and Casablanca, in the Valparaíso Region, representing his party within the Frente Amplio coalition pact. He was elected on 19 November 2017 with 13,289 votes (4.13% of valid votes).

In August 2021, he presented his candidacy for re-election for District No. 7, Valparaíso Region, representing RD within the Apruebo Dignidad pact for the 2022–2026 legislative term. In November of that year, he was re-elected after obtaining 23,603 votes, corresponding to 6.62% of valid votes cast.

Since July 2024, he has been a member of the Frente Amplio Party.
