= District 7 (Chamber of Deputies of Chile) =

Electoral district of the Chamber of Deputies of Chile

- Distrito 7
- Electoral District for the Chamber of Deputies
- Location of District 7 within Chile
- Commune: List: Algarrobo; Cartagena; Casablanca; Concón; Easter Island; El Quisco; El Tabo; Juan Fernández Islands; San Antonio; Santo Domingo; Valparaíso; Viña del Mar
- Region: Valparaíso
- Population: 876,644 (2017)
- Electorate: 812,542 (2021)
- Area: 3,246 km^{2} (2020)

Current Electoral District
- Created: 2017
- Seats: 8 (2017–present)
- Deputies: List: Jorge Brito (FA); Andrés Celis (RN); Luis Alberto Cuello (PC); Tomás Lagomarsino (Ind); Tomás de Rementería (PS); Camila Rojas (FA); Luis Sánchez (REP); Hotuiti Teao (Ind)

District 7 (Spanish: Distrito 7) is one of the 28 multi-member electoral districts of the Chamber of Deputies, the lower house of the National Congress, the national legislature of Chile. The district was created by the 2015 electoral reform and came into being at the following general election in 2017. It consists of the communes of Algarrobo, Cartagena, Casablanca, Concón, Easter Island, El Quisco, El Tabo, Juan Fernández Islands, San Antonio, Santo Domingo, Valparaíso and Viña del Mar in the region of Valparaíso. The district currently elects eight of the 155 members of the Chamber of Deputies using the open party-list proportional representation electoral system. At the 2021 general election the district had 812,542 registered electors.

== Electoral system ==
District 7 currently elects eight of the 155 members of the Chamber of Deputies using the open party-list proportional representation electoral system. Parties may form electoral pacts with each other to pool their votes and increase their chances of winning seats. However, the number of candidates nominated by an electoral pact may not exceed the maximum number of candidates that a single party may nominate. Seats are allocated using the D'Hondt method.

== Election results ==
=== Summary ===
Election	Apruebo Dignidad AD / FA			Dignidad Ahora DA			New Social Pact NPS / NM			Democratic Convergence CD			Chile Vamos Podemos / Vamos			Party of the People PDG			Christian Social Front FSC		
Election	Votes	%	Seats	Votes	%	Seats	Votes	%	Seats	Votes	%	Seats	Votes	%	Seats	Votes	%	Seats	Votes	%	Seats
2021	91,663	25.71%	3	13,864	3.89%	0	59,184	16.60%	2				86,686	24.31%	2	29,214	8.19%	0	48,152	13.50%	1
2017	80,201	24.90%	2				63,604	19.75%	2	33,824	10.50%	1	120,025	37.27%	3						

=== Detailed ===
==== 2021 ====
Results of the 2021 general election held on 21 November 2021:

Party		Pact	Party															Pact		
Party		Pact	Votes per commune												Total votes	%	Seats	Votes	%	Seats
Party		Pact	Algar- robo	Carta- gena	Casa- blanca	Concón	Easter Island	El Quisco	El Tabo	Juan Fernán- dez	San Anto- nio	Santo Dom- ingo	Val- paraíso	Viña del Mar	Total votes	%	Seats	Votes	%	Seats
Democratic Revolution	RD	Apruebo Dignidad	409	284	783	1,431	101	418	357	59	1,487	247	12,775	13,002	31,353	8.79%	1	91,663	25.71%	3
Comunes	COM	Apruebo Dignidad	422	1,234	447	592	60	561	630	7	9,897	708	5,781	4,781	25,120	7.04%	1	91,663	25.71%	3
Communist Party of Chile	PC	Apruebo Dignidad	271	284	303	708	76	567	412	3	1,230	83	6,957	6,788	17,682	4.96%	1	91,663	25.71%	3
Social Convergence	CS	Apruebo Dignidad	263	145	183	586	70	362	299	7	1,426	162	4,294	3,709	11,506	3.23%	0	91,663	25.71%	3
Social Green Regionalist Federation	FREVS	Apruebo Dignidad	97	73	116	283	53	116	120	1	261	32	2,000	2,850	6,002	1.68%	0	91,663	25.71%	3
Evópoli	EVO	Chile Podemos +	592	979	961	5,360	1,051	430	465	21	2,320	833	6,379	15,018	34,409	9.65%	1	86,686	24.31%	2
National Renewal	RN	Chile Podemos +	971	641	956	1,681	87	706	653	29	2,470	761	8,245	14,401	31,601	8.86%	1	86,686	24.31%	2
Independent Democratic Union	UDI	Chile Podemos +	533	670	376	1,431	66	319	470	5	1,081	693	7,914	7,118	20,676	5.80%	0	86,686	24.31%	2
Radical Party of Chile	PR	New Social Pact	168	132	520	1,380	27	216	227	4	495	65	12,483	10,662	26,379	7.40%	1	59,184	16.60%	2
Socialist Party of Chile	PS	New Social Pact	184	141	275	504	52	195	180	15	1,146	139	2,921	3,993	9,745	2.73%	1	59,184	16.60%	2
Christian Democratic Party	PDC	New Social Pact	216	267	361	425	42	265	198	9	877	171	3,218	2,828	8,877	2.49%	0	59,184	16.60%	2
Liberal Party of Chile	PL	New Social Pact	209	284	226	392	96	208	138	11	644	107	2,593	2,421	7,329	2.06%	0	59,184	16.60%	2
Party for Democracy	PPD	New Social Pact	79	114	218	455	33	77	113	6	330	59	1,394	3,976	6,854	1.92%	0	59,184	16.60%	2
Republican Party	REP	Christian Social Front	1,370	771	1,277	4,304	110	831	684	18	2,460	1,576	12,345	22,406	48,152	13.50%	1	48,152	13.50%	1
Party of the People	PDG		430	612	746	1,420	154	569	460	38	3,326	374	9,834	11,251	29,214	8.19%	0	29,214	8.19%	0
United Centre	CU	United Independents	369	380	443	752	161	371	329	11	1,367	204	5,356	4,268	14,011	3.93%	0	14,011	3.93%	0
Equality Party	IGUAL	Dignidad Ahora	404	199	222	304	48	231	174	10	896	80	3,495	2,377	8,440	2.37%	0	13,864	3.89%	0
Humanist Party	PH	Dignidad Ahora	60	78	97	127	45	126	68	2	426	34	3,419	942	5,424	1.52%	0	13,864	3.89%	0
Patriotic Union	UPA		156	194	212	398	39	143	145	2	781	115	2,382	2,545	7,112	1.99%	0	7,112	1.99%	0
Revolutionary Workers Party	PTR		97	148	331	228	48	142	125	8	683	85	2,797	2,000	6,692	1.88%	0	6,692	1.88%	0
Valid votes			7,300	7,630	9,053	22,761	2,419	6,853	6,247	266	33,603	6,528	116,582	137,336	356,578	100.00%	8	356,578	100.00%	8
Blank votes			553	593	1,093	1,171	425	554	452	43	2,742	552	6,390	6,636	21,204	5.31%				
Rejected votes – other			361	572	816	1,030	186	422	415	12	2,785	362	7,968	6,843	21,772	5.45%				
Total polled			8,214	8,795	10,962	24,962	3,030	7,829	7,114	321	39,130	7,442	130,940	150,815	399,554	49.17%				
Registered electors			14,805	18,730	22,793	40,829	6,493	14,675	12,832	930	78,647	11,869	287,931	302,008	812,542					
Turnout			55.48%	46.96%	48.09%	61.14%	46.67%	53.35%	55.44%	34.52%	49.75%	62.70%	45.48%	49.94%	49.17%					

The following candidates were elected: Jorge Brito (RD), 23,603 votes; Andrés Celis (RN), 18,978 votes; Luis Alberto Cuello (PC), 13,342 votes; Tomás Lagomarsino (PR), 26,379 votes; Tomás de Rementería (PS), 5,817 votes; Camila Rojas (COM), 17,798 votes; Luis Sánchez (REP), 16,376 votes; and Hotuiti Teao (EVO), 16,058 votes.

==== 2017 ====
Results of the 2017 general election held on 19 November 2017:

Party		Pact	Party															Pact		
Party		Pact	Votes per commune												Total votes	%	Seats	Votes	%	Seats
Party		Pact	Algar- robo	Carta- gena	Casa- blanca	Concón	Easter Island	El Quisco	El Tabo	Juan Fernán- dez	San Anto- nio	Santo Dom- ingo	Val- paraíso	Viña del Mar	Total votes	%	Seats	Votes	%	Seats
Independent Democratic Union	UDI	Chile Vamos	1,660	2,378	2,459	4,830	1,051	1,439	1,249	86	7,572	2,577	19,792	27,834	72,927	22.64%	2	120,025	37.27%	3
National Renewal	RN	Chile Vamos	671	620	930	4,221	75	489	454	24	1,323	509	11,361	23,580	44,257	13.74%	1	120,025	37.27%	3
Evópoli	EVO	Chile Vamos	45	22	38	308	9	25	20	3	71	46	711	1,543	2,841	0.88%	0	120,025	37.27%	3
Equality Party	IGUAL	Broad Front	364	776	490	1,342	76	522	395	18	8,342	498	14,460	10,238	37,521	11.65%	1	80,201	24.90%	2
Democratic Revolution	RD	Broad Front	176	206	344	1,002	53	164	128	9	949	104	10,496	8,926	22,557	7.00%	1	80,201	24.90%	2
Humanist Party	PH	Broad Front	71	86	195	510	36	89	61	9	362	37	8,701	4,868	15,025	4.66%	0	80,201	24.90%	2
Citizen Power	PODER	Broad Front	28	48	124	178	13	36	33	3	186	15	2,982	1,452	5,098	1.58%	0	80,201	24.90%	2
Party for Democracy	PPD	Nueva Mayoría	223	626	545	1,408	69	283	289	69	1,330	191	5,094	13,695	23,822	7.40%	1	63,604	19.75%	2
Socialist Party of Chile	PS	Nueva Mayoría	435	300	537	1,114	42	319	388	7	1,763	195	8,379	8,163	21,642	6.72%	1	63,604	19.75%	2
Communist Party of Chile	PC	Nueva Mayoría	159	360	257	573	37	397	256	7	1,561	193	7,359	4,406	15,565	4.83%	0	63,604	19.75%	2
Social Democrat Radical Party	PRSD	Nueva Mayoría	34	51	212	119	12	53	35	4	222	28	1,109	696	2,575	0.80%	0	63,604	19.75%	2
Christian Democratic Party	PDC	Democratic Convergence	709	1,238	1,563	1,196	115	906	656	3	6,974	945	8,753	10,766	33,824	10.50%	1	33,824	10.50%	1
Amplitude	AMP	Sumemos	852	197	510	432	33	520	120	7	856	109	2,884	2,957	9,477	2.94%	0	9,477	2.94%	0
Progressive Party	PRO	All Over Chile	161	288	323	507	56	157	146	8	1,038	153	3,216	2,765	8,818	2.74%	0	8,818	2.74%	0
Patriotic Union	UPA		98	159	202	408	28	87	91	6	580	87	2,082	2,303	6,131	1.90%	0	6,131	1.90%	0
Valid votes			5,686	7,355	8,729	18,148	1,705	5,486	4,321	263	33,129	5,687	107,379	124,192	322,080	100.00%	8	322,080	100.00%	8
Blank votes			365	539	949	1,362	190	325	338	31	2,234	458	6,114	6,815	19,720	5.48%				
Rejected votes – other			275	498	567	1,007	84	264	251	13	2,242	247	6,719	6,202	18,369	5.10%				
Total polled			6,326	8,392	10,245	20,517	1,979	6,075	4,910	307	37,605	6,392	120,212	137,209	360,169	46.06%				
Registered electors			11,810	17,294	21,299	35,636	5,302	11,681	9,295	853	77,270	10,455	285,301	295,845	782,041					
Turnout			53.56%	48.53%	48.10%	57.57%	37.33%	52.01%	52.82%	35.99%	48.67%	61.14%	42.14%	46.38%	46.06%					

The following candidates were elected: Jorge Brito (RD), 13,289 votes; Andrés Celis (RN), 21,285 votes; Marcelo Díaz (PS), 15,265 votes; Rodrigo González Torres (PPD), 16,849 votes; María José Hoffmann (UDI), 34,690 votes; Camila Rojas (IGUAL), 14,885 votes; Víctor Torres Jeldes (PDC), 14,942 votes; and Osvaldo Urrutia (UDI), 18,198 votes.
