= Coast of Poets =

Cultural space in Chile

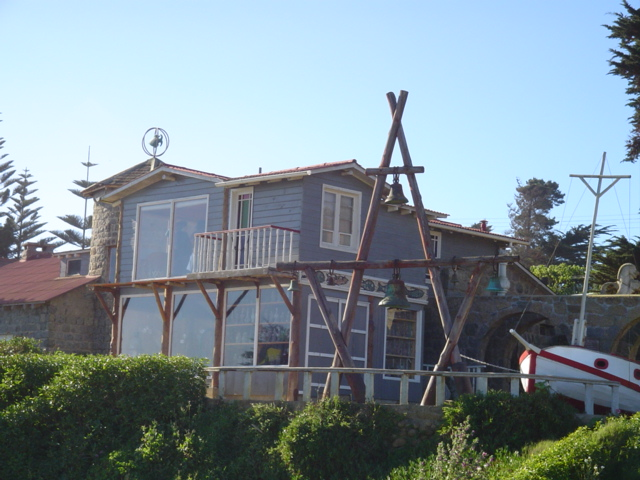
Pablo Neruda's house, Isla Negra, on the El Quisco commune coast. Pablo Neruda and his wife Matilde Urrutia are buried on these grounds. The site currently includes a museum in honour of the Chilean Nobel laureate.

The Coast of Poets is a cultural space in the Valparaíso Region of Chile, named for four world-renowned Chilean poets (Pablo Neruda, Vicente Huidobro, Nicanor Parra and Violeta Parra).

== Description ==
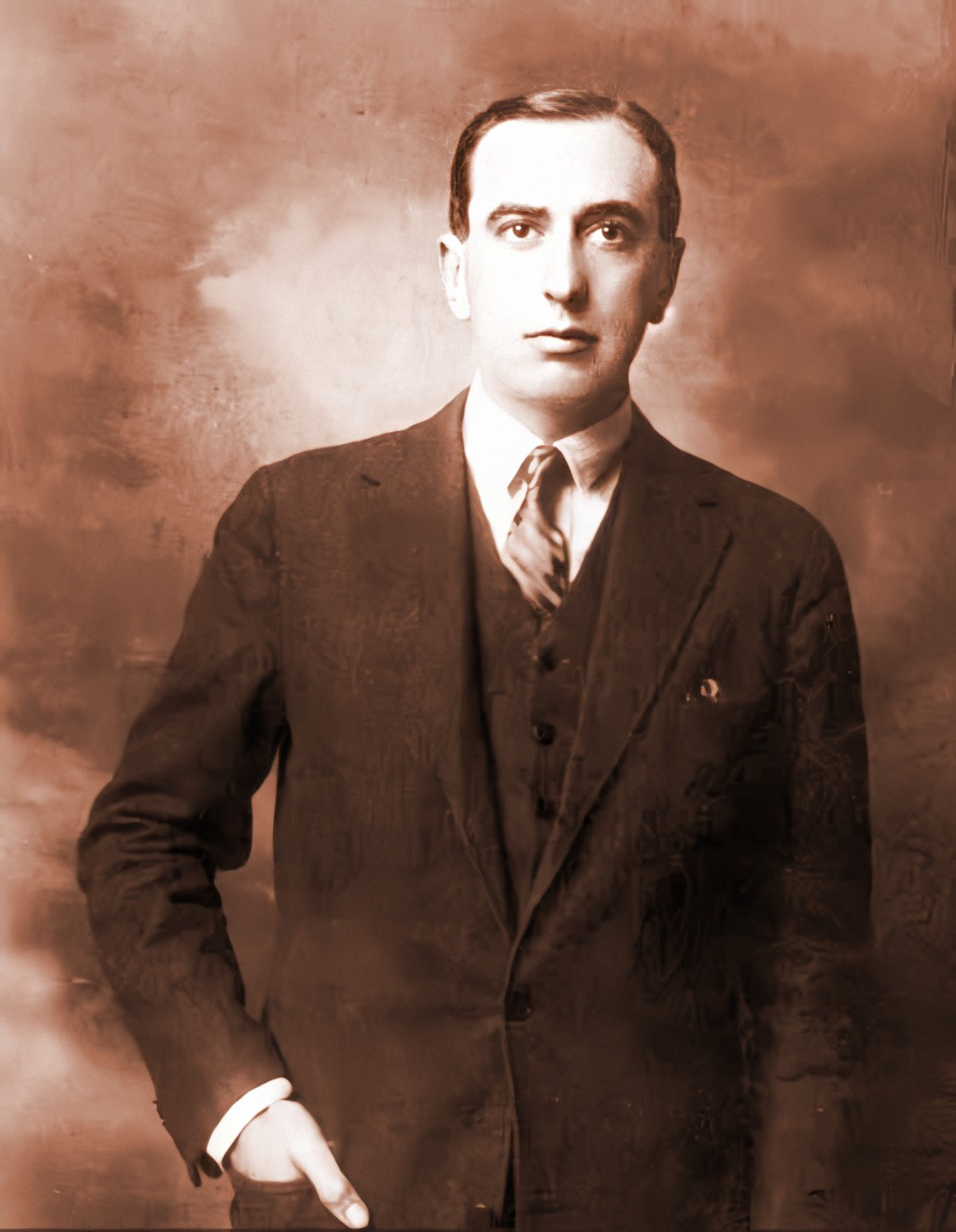
Vicente Huidobro.

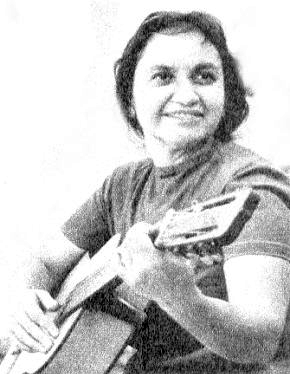
Violeta Parra.

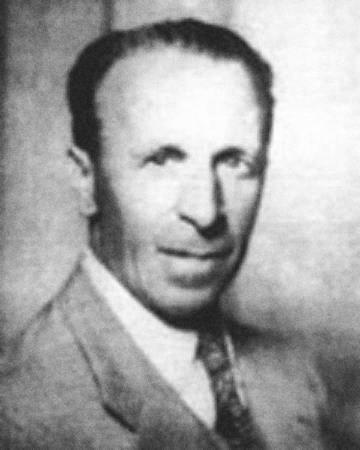
José Perotti.

The poets were the first to take up residence in this area, followed by various artists, thus creating a close link between the land and its creativity, projecting a symbolic imagery that put Chile on the international cultural map. Places such as El Quisco, Isla Negra, Las Cruces, El Tabo and Cartagena have become a hub for cultural activity.

El Quisco itself has been a meeting place for people such as Nobel laureate Pablo Neruda, who composed his famous poem Oda al Caldillo de Congrío (English: “Ode to Conger Chowder”) in the local restaurant Chez Camilo; folk singer Violeta Parra; writer, poet and composer Clara Solovera; cartoonist René Ríos Boettiger, otherwise known as Pepo, the creator of famous character Condorito; artist José Perotti; and painter Camilo Mori, who designed the official emblem for the municipality of El Quisco.

In Isla Negra, two greats of the Chilean arts, Pablo Neruda and Violeta Parra, spent long periods of time. Chilean artist Violeta Parra gave classes in crafts and folklore in Isla Negra. She worked in ceramics, oil painting and hessian cloth.

Isla Negra was given this name by Pablo Neruda, upon him sighting the black rock in the sea near his house (Isla Negra means "Black Island" in English). When asked what the place would be called, he said "Isla Negra, for those rocks.”

"The sea seemed cleaner to me than the land and this is why I came to live on the coast of my homeland, amid the great foam of Isla Negra."

The Casa de Isla Negra is also to be found here, now Neruda's place of burial, together with his wife Matilde. On one of his many returns to Chile, in 1937, the poet sought an ideal place to write his celebrated work Canto General. Neruda bought the site of Isla Negra from a Spanish former sailor who settled in the area following the sinking of his ship in Punta Arenas. With the help of architect Germán Rodríguez Arias, he remodeled it to resemble a ship, with low ceilings and narrow passageways. The house would become a beloved refuge for the poet. It is now administered by the Neruda Foundation, with a museum exhibiting his extensive collection of objects, including ship figureheads, shells, bottles and maps.

In Cartagena, poet Vicente Huidobro died in January 1948. Creator and exponent of the creationist movement, he is considered one of the "four greats of Chilean poetry", alongside Pablo Neruda, Pablo de Rokha and Gabriela Mistral. A house-museum dedicated to the poet was opened here in September 2013.

In Las Cruces lives Nicanor Parra, a Chilean "anti-poet". Parra is credited for creating the "anti-poetry" movement, a literary expression that breaks with the traditional canons of poetic lyricism. One of his most recognised works is Poemas y Antipoemas (1954), where he replaces carefully written, metaphorical syntax with everyday, direct language. Considered one of the most influential Spanish poetry collections of the twentieth century, Poemas y Antipoemas is cited as an inspiration by American Beat writers like Allen Ginsberg. Parra is also the recipient of the prestigious Cervantes prize for Spanish-language literature.

== See also ==
- Pablo Neruda
- Vicente Huidobro
- Violeta Parra
- Nicanor Parra
- Casa de Isla Negra
