= Víctor Torres Jeldes =

Víctor Torres
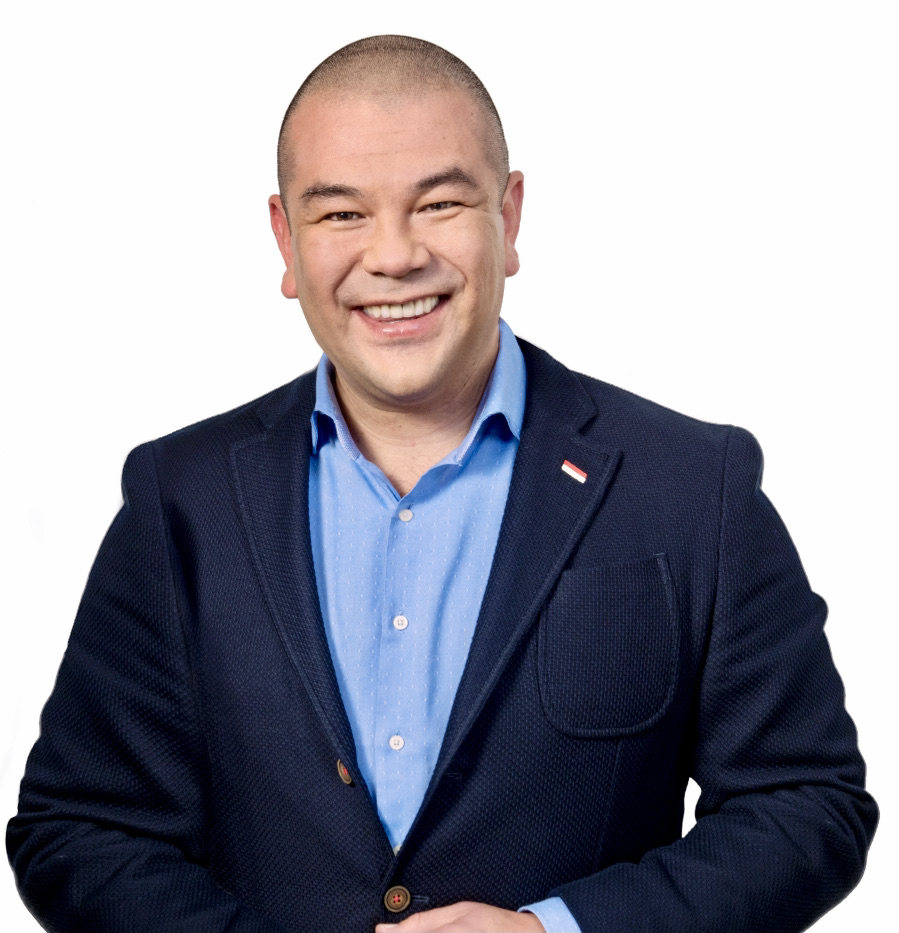

Member of the Chamber of Deputies
- In office 11 March 2018 – 11 March 2022
- Constituency: District 7
- In office 11 March 2010 – 11 March 2018
- Preceded by: Samuel Venegas
- Succeeded by: Dissolution of the District
- Constituency: 15th District

Governor of San Antonio Province
- In office 22 January 2007 – 9 December 2008
- Preceded by: Humberto Burotto
- Succeeded by: Alfredo Nebreda

Personal details
- Born: 11 October 1975 (age 51) Valparaíso, Chile
- Party: Christian Democratic Party
- Spouse: Divorced
- Children: One
- Education: University of Valparaíso (BA); Andrés Bello National University (MA)
- Occupation: Politician
- Profession: Physician

Víctor Marcelo Torres Jeldes (born 11 October 1975) is a Chilean politician and physician, who served as member of the Chamber of Deputies of Chile.

From 2022, he serves as Health Superintendent, position where was appointed by President Gabriel Boric.
