= Canal 2 San Antonio =

Television station in San Antonio, Chile

- Country: Chile
- Broadcast area: San Antonio, Valparaíso

Programming
- Language(s): Spanish

Ownership
- Owner: Sociedad Difusora de Radio y Televisión San Antonio Ltda.

History
- Launched: 24 October 1994

Links
- Website: www.tvu.cl

Availability

Terrestrial
- VHF: Channel 2 (San Antonio, Chile)

Canal 2 San Antonio is a Chilean over-the-air television station that airs from the city of San Antonio, in the region of Valparaíso. It was launched in 1994 on channel 29 of the TV Cable San Antonio cable system.

== History ==
The channel was launched on October 24, 1994, on TV Cable San Antonio channel 29. Its first broadcast program was the news program Cable Noticias, hosted by journalist Luis Alfonso Valderas and carried out by students from the Cidec Technical Training Center in Santiago. In 1996, during the municipal elections, the station launched a special political program hosted by José Luis Alarcón, called Road to the elections. For their part, sporting events were commented on by Marco Velozo and Patricio Iturrieta on the Panorama program.

In 1997, VTR Cablexpress expanded the channel's coverage to the communes of Santo Domingo in the south, and Cartagena in the north. This year, the way the program was transmitted was changed from VHS to Super VHS, which allowed for greater quality and resolution in the recordings. The most watched program on Canal 29 was Mascable, a youth program hosted by Alejandro Santis, Roberto Vega and Luis Talamilla Abarca. At the beginning of 1998, Canal 2 began broadcasting on Radio Cristalina FM, in addition to a cable television channel (VTR Cablexpress), all prepared by Fénix Producciones. In June 1998, Channel 2 moved its frequency to UHF channel 31 and, in November, to UHF frequency 23. For its part, the canal facilities were established at Calle Juan Antonio Ríos 1498, Barrancas. On September 1, 1999, the channel moved to channel 2 of VTR's local system.

In 2001, the channel purchased the domains "tvsanantonio.cl" and "canal2.cl" on the Internet. In May 2001, the new studios located in the civic neighborhood of Barrancas were inaugurated. On October 30, 2001, Luis Valderas, executive director, requested the opening of the Public Tender for channel 2, which finally happened on October 28, 2002, when Subtel supported the project presented.

In 2003, Sociedad Difusora de Radio y Televisión San Antonio Ltda. reported expenses in addition to the channel's financing, because the company purchased new land for the construction of the channel's new studios, in addition to the equipment necessary for the transmission and recording of programs. On March 15, 2003, Channel 2 made legal publications in the Official Gazette. On October 27, 2003, the National Television Council definitively grants VHF channel 2 of San Antonio to the Sociedad Difusora de Radio y Televisión San Antonio Ltda. On December 31, 2003, subscription television transmissions end.

On January 31, 2004, Channel 2 carried out the first tests of the transmitter. Its broadcasts began on February 16, 2004, with new programming. On June 13, 2004, Channel 2 was the only television station to record the San Antonio Prison riot from start to finish. The station led audience reception throughout the province.

On November 8, 2005, the radio station on the 93.3 MHz frequency became a member of the Sociedad Difusora de Radio y Televisión San Antonio Ltda. and retransmitted programs from channel 2.

In July 2009, Mónica Madariaga returned to the public agenda by stating, in an interview conducted by Patricio Tombolini and journalist Luis Valderas on the channel's Cámara Abierta program, that in 1982 she had interceded to free Sebastián Piñera, at that time General Manager of the Bank of Talca, from his imprisonment for fraud and violations of the General Banking Law. Piñera denied the accusations, however Madariaga reaffirmed his sayings, calling the then presidential candidate of the Coalition for Change (today Chile Vamos) a “liar.”

On November 15, 2019, the Channel 2 transmission plant suffered an attack that left its over-the-air signal off the air.

== Programs ==
- Cablenoticias (1994–present)
- Primer Plano (1996–1998)
- Camino a las Elecciones Municipales (1996)
- Panorama (1996–2001)
- Mascable (1998–2004)
- La Hora del Desafío (1998–2000)
- Séptimo Día (1998–2002)
- Oído Medio (1999–2000)
- San Antonio Pregunta (1999)
- Multimedia (1999–2003)
- Visión Deportiva (1999–present)
- Cartagena al Día (1999)
- Deportes y Algo Más (1999–2003)
- Panorama, Cine y Video (1999–present)
- Set a Set (1999)
- Bajo Control (1999–2001)
- Tercer Piso (1999)
- Sin Stress (1999–2003)
- Ximena Contigo (1999-2003/2004–present)
- Creer en San Antonio (1999–2000)
- Educación, Prevención y Salud (1999–2000)
- Gente de San Antonio (1999–present)
- Visión Comunal (2000–2003)
- Región Oculta (2001–present)
- La Hora del Talento (2001/2004–present)
- Imago Mundi (2002-2003/2004–present)
- Somos Más (2004–2006)
- Video Música (2004–present)
- Clasificados a su Servicio (2004–present)
- Un Ciclo de Enfoques (2004)
- Tiempos Violentos (2005–2008)
- Opinión Pública (2005–present)
- El Retrovisor (2010–present)
