= Lo Abarca, Cartagena =

Village in Chile

Coordinates: 33°31′17.79712″S 71°32′36.83922″W

Lo Abarca is a Chilean village, located in Cartagena, about 45 kilometres (28 mi) northwest of Melipilla, Chile. In 1899, it had 393 inhabitants.

It also had a Catholic Parish, constructed in 1873; a registry office; a post office; and a free school.

Every December 8, a religious holiday takes place in Abarca. Abarca is named after former owners of the area.
