= Viña Emiliana =

Chilean vineyard and winery

- Location: Casablanca, Chile
- Appellation: Casablanca Valley
- Formerly: Viña Santa Emiliana (1986-2004)
- Founded: 1986 (38–39 years ago)
- Key people: President: Rafael Guilisasti
- Acres cultivated: 1977
- Cases/yr: 700,000
- Known for: Gê, Signos de Origen, Coyam, Vigno, Adobe, Novas, Organic, Salvaje
- Website: emiliana.cl

Viña Emiliana is a vineyard and winery, founded in 1986, in Casablanca, Valparaíso Region, Chile. In 2015 it had more than 800 organic hectares of vineyards, distributed among the valleys of Casablanca, Maipo, Cachapoal, Colchagua, Biobío and Limarí, as well an annual export of 700,000 cases in 2016, it sold in 60 countries, being its main destinations: United States, Netherlands, Denmark, China and Canada.

Since 1998, Emiliana highlight as ecological and sustainable vineyard, through the biodynamic method and organic agriculture, being recognized by the Association Wines of Chile as a pioneer of the country in this type practical approach, with the award Chilean Winery of the Year in 2015. Due to its scale, it is one of the three largest organic vineyards in the world.

== Awards and honours ==
National:

- Vineyard of the year, in 2015, awarded by the Association Wines of Chile.

International:

- Among the 50 best wineries in 2011 and 2012, according to the World Association of Journalists and Writers of Wines and Spirits.
