= Eupithecia seatacama =

Scientific classification
- Kingdom: Animalia
- Phylum: Arthropoda
- Class: Insecta
- Order: Lepidoptera
- Family: Geometridae
- Genus: Eupithecia
- Species: E. seatacama

Binomial name
- Eupithecia seatacama Rindge, 1987

Species of moth

Eupithecia seatacama is a moth in the family Geometridae first described by Rindge in 1987. It is found in the regions of Atacama (Copiapó Province) and Valparaiso (San Antonio Province) in Chile. The habitat consists of either the Coquimban Desert or Central Coastal Cordillera Biotic Province.

The length of the forewings is about 9.5 mm for males. Adults have been recorded on wing in October.
