= Islote Pájaros Niños =

Island of Chile

Islote Pájaros Niños Nature Sanctuary
- IUCN category IV (habitat/species management area)
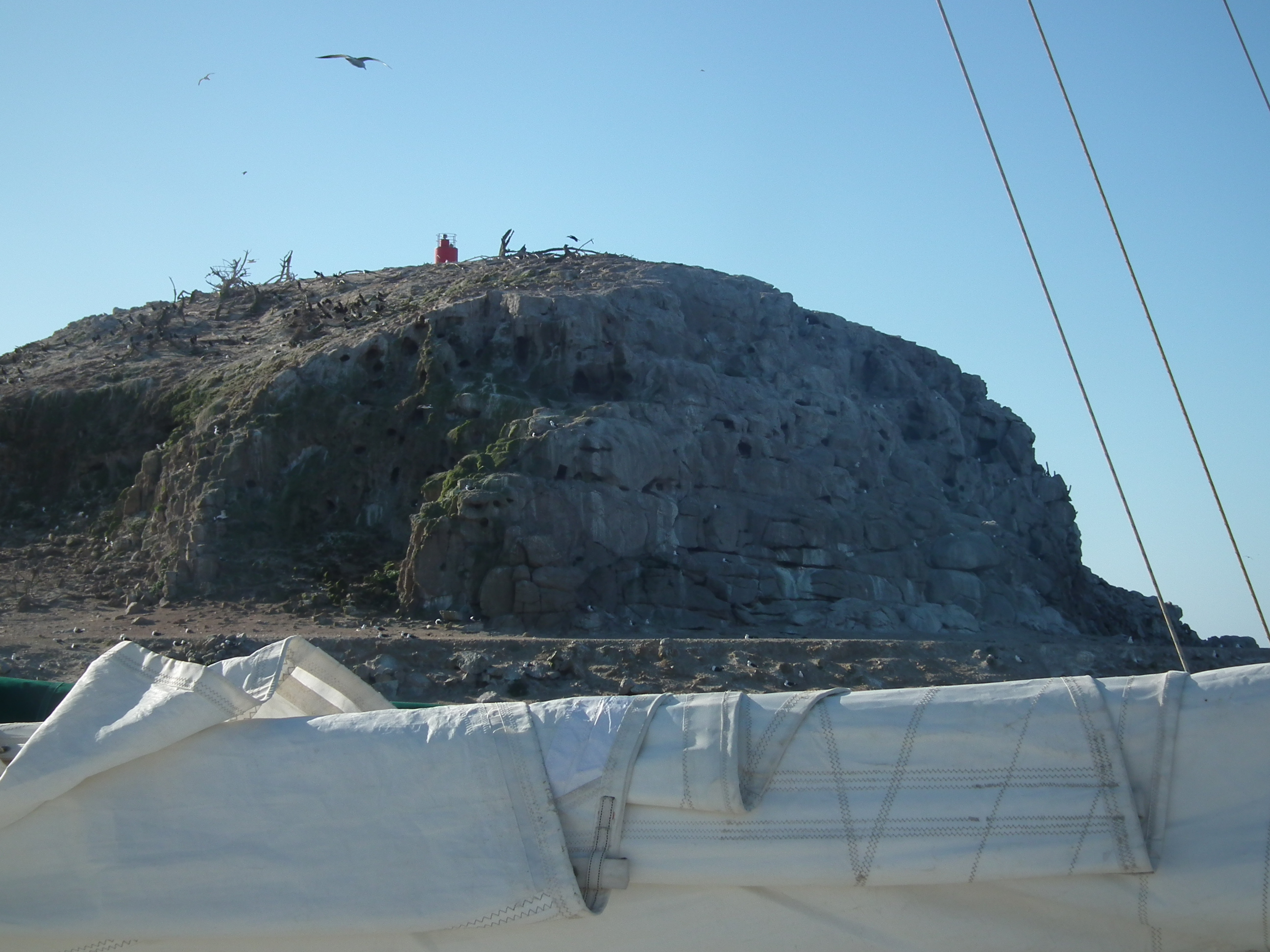
- Interactive map of Islote Pájaros Niños Nature Sanctuary
- Location: Algarrobo, Valparaiso Region, Chile
- Nearest city: Algarrobo
- Coordinates: 33°21′36″S 71°41′16″W
- Area: 6.17 ha (15.2 acres)
- Designation: Nature sanctuary
- Designated: 1978
- Administrator: Algarrobo Municipality

Islote Pájaros Niños is an inshore island near Algarrobo, Chile, some 6.17 hectares in size. It is home to a colony of 250-500 Humboldt penguins (Spheniscus humboldti) and Magellanic penguins which can be viewed from a nearby hilltop using binoculars. Access to the island is restricted to members of the adjacent yacht club. The breakwater which connects the island to the mainland was constructed in 1977 and 1978. The island was declared a protected Nature Sanctuary in 1978. At that time, the island was estimated to support 800 penguins.

Between 2016 and 2020, the breeding population of Humboldt penguins was estimated at 25-473 individuals, resident Peruvian pelicans (Pelecanus thagus) at 30–1,000 individuals, and non-breeding Guanay cormorants (Leucocarbo bougainvilliorum) at 10-500 individuals.

The reserve is administered by Algarrobo municipality.
