= Concón =

- City and commune
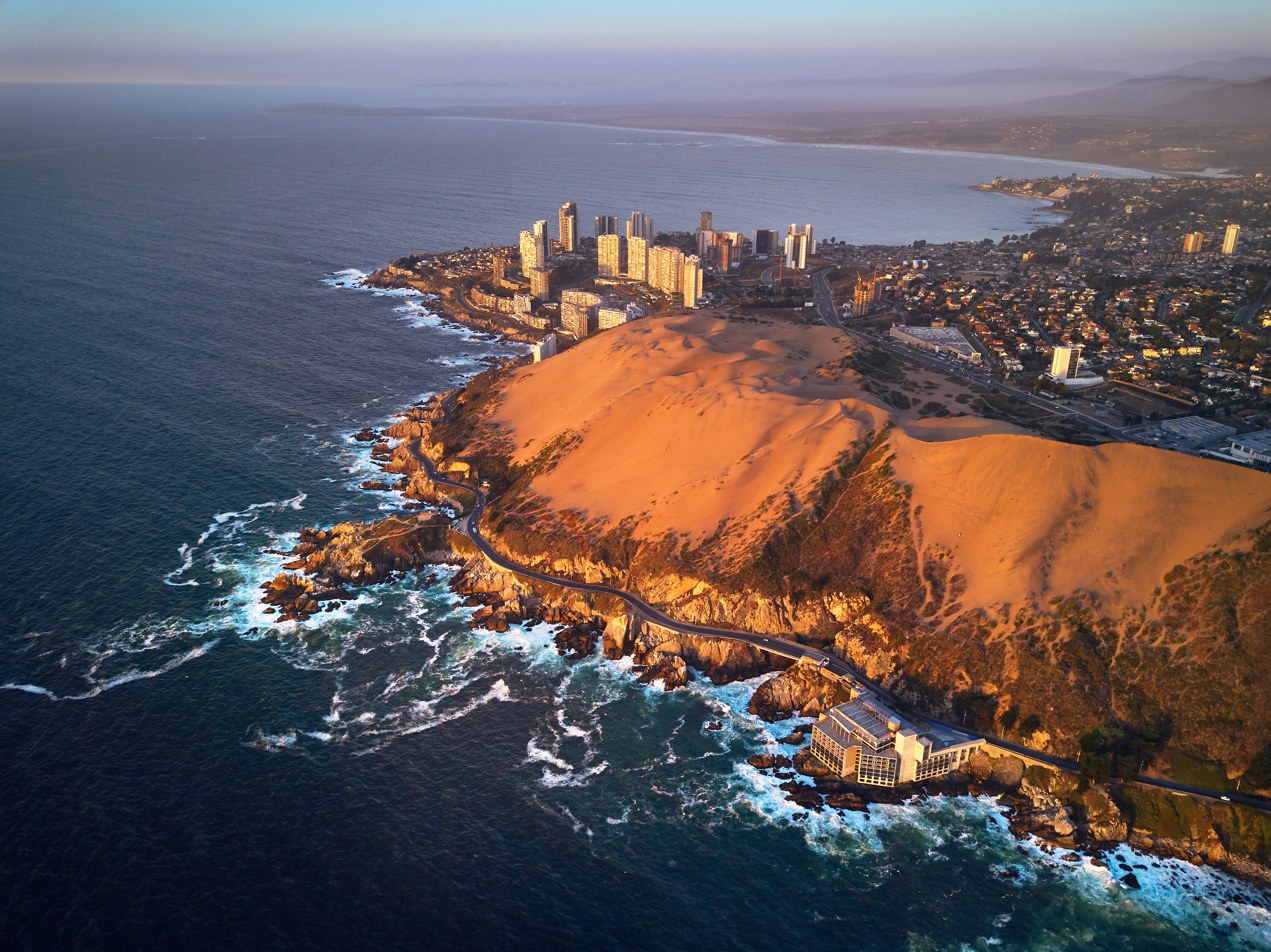
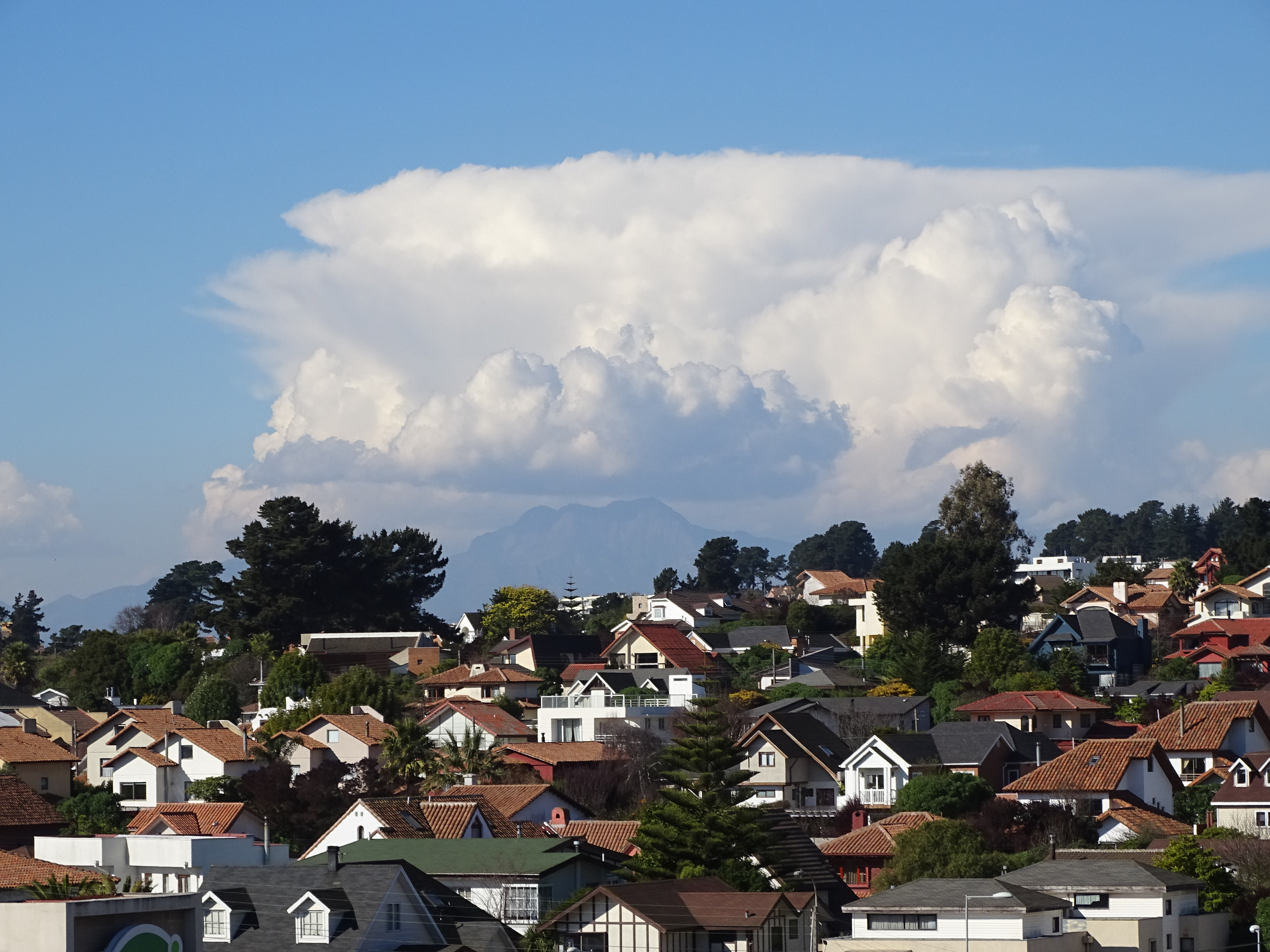
- From top to bottom: Concón Dunes and view of the neighborhood of Bosques de Montemar

- Flag Coat of arms Location in Chile
- Coordinates (city): 32°55′S 71°31′W
- Country: Chile
- Region: Valparaíso
- Province: Valparaíso
- Founded: 30 May 1899 (1st commune); 28 December 1995 (2nd commune)

Government
  - Type: Municipality
  - Mayor: Freddy Ramírez (Ind)

Area
  - Total: 76.0 km^{2} (29.3 sq mi)
- Elevation: 27 m (89 ft)

Population (2017 Census)
  - Total: 42,152
  - Density: 555/km^{2} (1,440/sq mi)
  - Urban: 39,409
  - Rural: 2,743
- Demonym: Conconino

Sex
  - Men: 20,321
  - Women: 21,831
- Time zone: UTC-4 (CLT)
  - Summer (DST): UTC-3 (CLST)
- Area code: country 56 + city 32
- Website: Official website (in Spanish)

Concón is a Chilean city and commune in Valparaíso Province, Valparaíso Region. It is a major tourist center known for its beaches, balnearios (beachside resorts) and nightlife.

== History ==
This location was first mentioned by Pedro de Valdivia in 1541. It was created as a municipality in 1899 but became part of Viña del Mar in 1927. A 1995 law again turned it into its own municipality.

== Geography ==
The commune of Concón spans an area of 76.0 km^{2} (29 sq mi). It is located on the Pacific coast north of Reñaca, Viña del Mar and south of Quintero. The Aconcagua river ends at the north of the town.

Its three main beaches are Playa Negra, Amarilla and Boca. 50 hectares of dunes stretch along and above the coast, though only about 20 are protected, the rest being increasingly encroached by highrise apartment buildings.

== Demographics ==
According to data from the 2017 Census of Population and Housing, the commune of Concón had 42,152 inhabitants; of these, 39,409 (93.5%) lived in urban areas and 2,743 (6.5%) in rural areas. At that time, there were 20,321 men and 21,831 women. The population grew by 30.61% (9,879 persons) between the 2002 and 2017 censuses. The 2024 projected population was 48,171.

The demonym for a person from Concón is Conconino for a man, or Conconina for a woman.

== Administration ==
As a commune, Concón administered by a municipal council, which is headed by a directly elected mayor. The mayor since 2021 has been Freddy Ramírez Villalobos (Ind). The municipal council for the 2024–2028 term has the following members:

- Ricardo Urenda Herencia (Ind./Evópoli)
- Paulina Zúñiga Guevara (REP)
- María José Aguirre Neuenschwander (Ind./Evópoli)
- Jorge Valdovinos Gómez (Ind./RN)
- Alberto Fernández López (PR)
- Elda Arteaga Breiding (DC)

Within the electoral divisions of Chile, Concón is represented in the Chamber of Deputies by Luis Sánchez (REP), Sebastián Zamora (Ind./REP), Hotuiti Teao (Ind./UDI), Andrés Celis (RN), Jaime Bassa (FA), Jorge Brito (FA), Luis Cuello (PC), and Juan Valenzuela (PDG) for the 2026–2030 term, as part of the 7th electoral district. The commune is represented in the Senate by Arturo Squella (REP), Andrés Longton (RN), Diego Ibáñez (FA), Camila Flores (RN), and Karol Cariola (PC) for the 2026–2034 term, as part of the 6th senatorial constituency (Valparaíso region).
