= Llolleo =

Coastal town in central Chile

Coordinates: 33°37′S 71°36′W

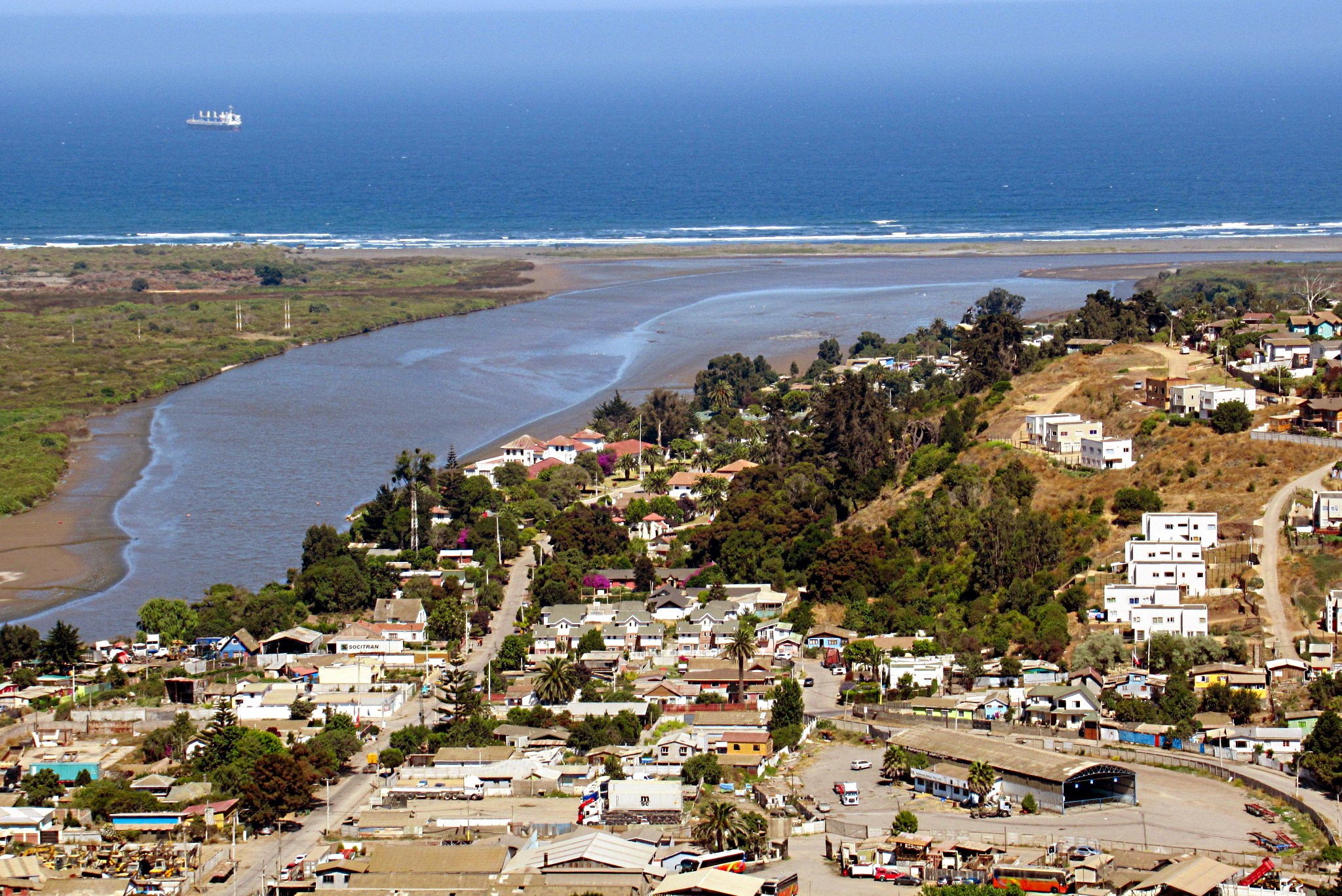
Llolleo at the mouth of the Maipo River

Llolleo, also known as Llo-Lleo, is a town in the commune of San Antonio in the Region of Valparaiso, Chile. It is located 98 km from the capital Santiago and 4 km from the port of San Antonio. The Maipo River, which separates it from the Rocas de Santo Domingo, marks its southern boundary. Llolleo is also referred to as "La Boca" or "historic cove," where small-scale fishing for various seafood and fish is conducted. The name Llolleo originates from the Mapudungun word "Llollehue," meaning "fishing place." The town emerged as a resort town after the railway's construction in 1912.
