= El Quisco =

- Commune
- Coat of arms Location in Chile
- Coordinates: 33°23′28.71″S 71°41′34.58″W
- Country: Chile
- Region: Valparaíso
- Province: San Antonio

Government
  - Type: Municipality
  - Alcalde: José Antonio Jofré

Area
  - Total: 50.7 km^{2} (19.6 sq mi)
- Elevation: 13 m (43 ft)

Population (2012 Census)
  - Total: 11,329
  - Density: 223/km^{2} (579/sq mi)
  - Urban: 8,931
  - Rural: 536

Sex
  - Men: 4,815
  - Women: 4,652
- Time zone: UTC-4 (CLT)
  - Summer (DST): UTC-3 (CLST)
- Website: www.elquisco.cl

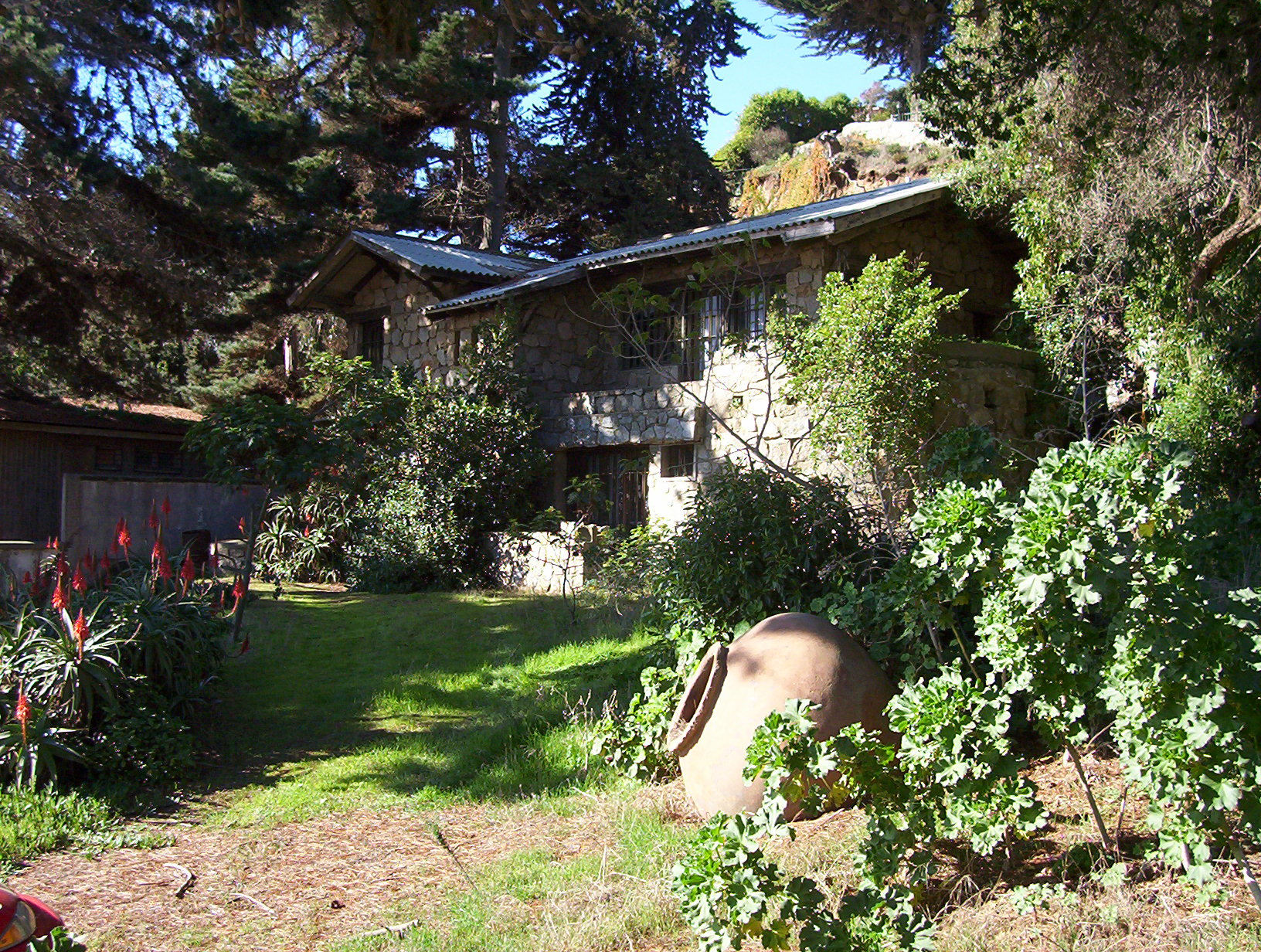
Heritage house of Isidoro Dubournais

El Quisco is a Chilean city and commune in San Antonio Province, Valparaíso Region. Located in the country's central coast, it serves as a popular summer resort for the population of Santiago and forms part of the Coast of Poets, a cultural space named after four Chilean poets: Pablo Neruda, Vicente Huidobro, Violeta Parra and Nicanor Parra. El Quisco is home to La Casa de Isla Negra, the former house of Chilean poet Pablo Neruda, which is now a museum and Neruda's burial site.

== Etymology ==
The word "quisco" refers to the Echinopsis chiloensis, a species of cactus native to the central coast of Chile. It is derived from the Quechua word khishka, meaning "spine."

== History ==
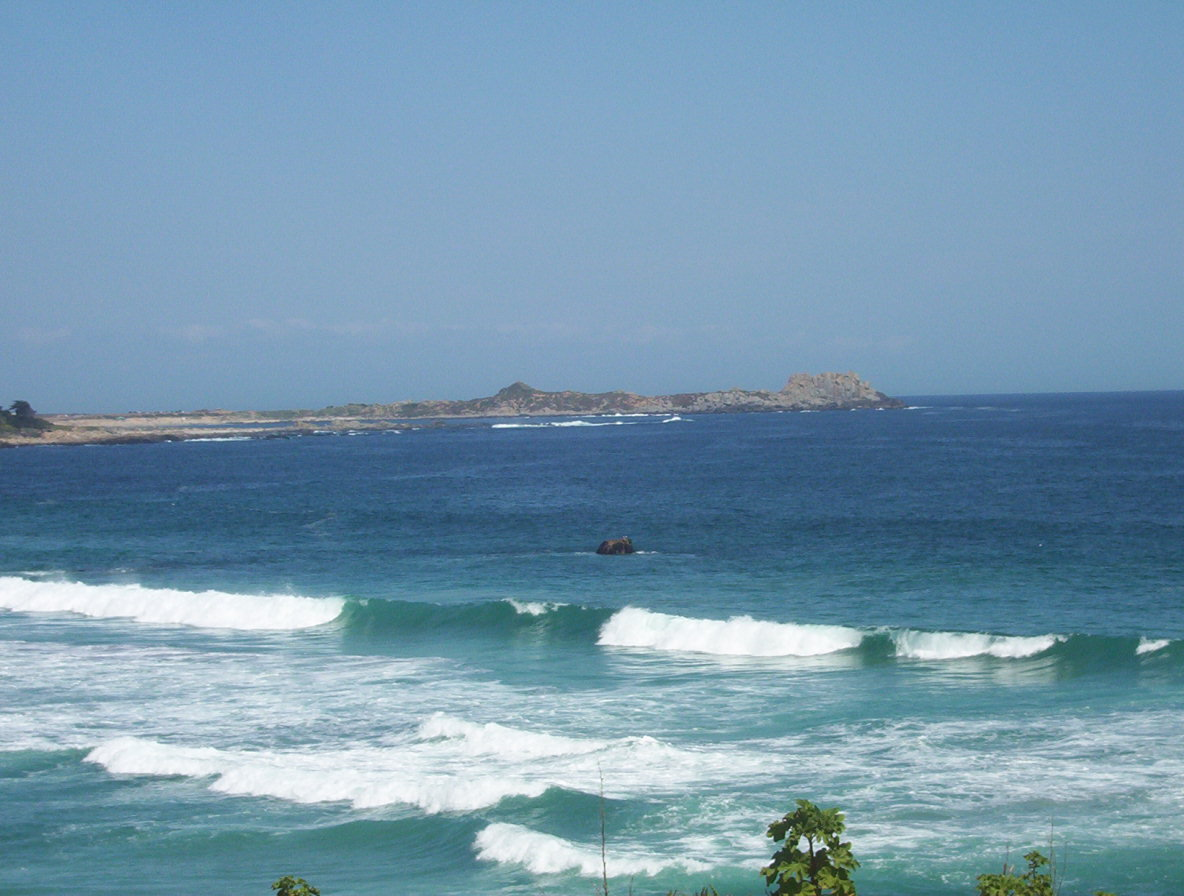
El Quisco

=== Early history ===
There have been important archaeological findings from the pre-ceramic period and the late ceramic period along the coast of El Quisco. El Quisco was a centre of the El Bato and Llolleo cultures, among others, and their presence coincided with the dates of the El Molle culture further north.

The Bato culture was established between 400 and 300 BC, and shared cultural traits with the Molle culture. Typical of this culture was the use of a tembetá (a metal or stone rod used in lower-lip piercings). In addition, mortars, stones used to grind vegetables and minerals, have been found. Evidence of this group has been found in Trebulco and in La Manresa, located near Lonquén. Its peak development came in 400 to 500 AD, both on the coast and in the interior, and the culture persisted in the Preandean zone until around 900 AD.

The El Molle culture was established in Chile around 300 AD among the Transverse Valleys of the rivers Copiapó and Choapa, with large migrations to the country from Brazil, from the tropical jungles of the Chaco, Argentine pampas, and from Peru. The first settlements were in the interior of the country, in El Molle (in the Valle de Elqui), where the first evidence was found. They mixed with existing populations and adopted some cultural elements and physical features from them. They were the predecessors of the Diaguita culture, and by the time the Spanish arrived (1492) they had already disappeared. This culture was located in what would become regions III (Atacama) and IV (Coquimbo) of modern Chile.

The Aconcagua culture spread along the coast, near the present-day resorts of Algarrobo, El Quisco, Llolleo, El Tabo, Las Cruces, Rocas de Santo Domingo, and Cartagena.

The ceramics of these cultures are commonly called the Aconcagua Salmon Type, for their orange colour with decorative designs in black paint, found in the Late Agroalfarero ("agro-potter") period of the region, between 800 and 1470, principally in pieces known as pucos, or bowls. The outer face is often a decoration representing the figure of a "Trinaurio", or whirlpool with three arms.

=== Mapuche period ===
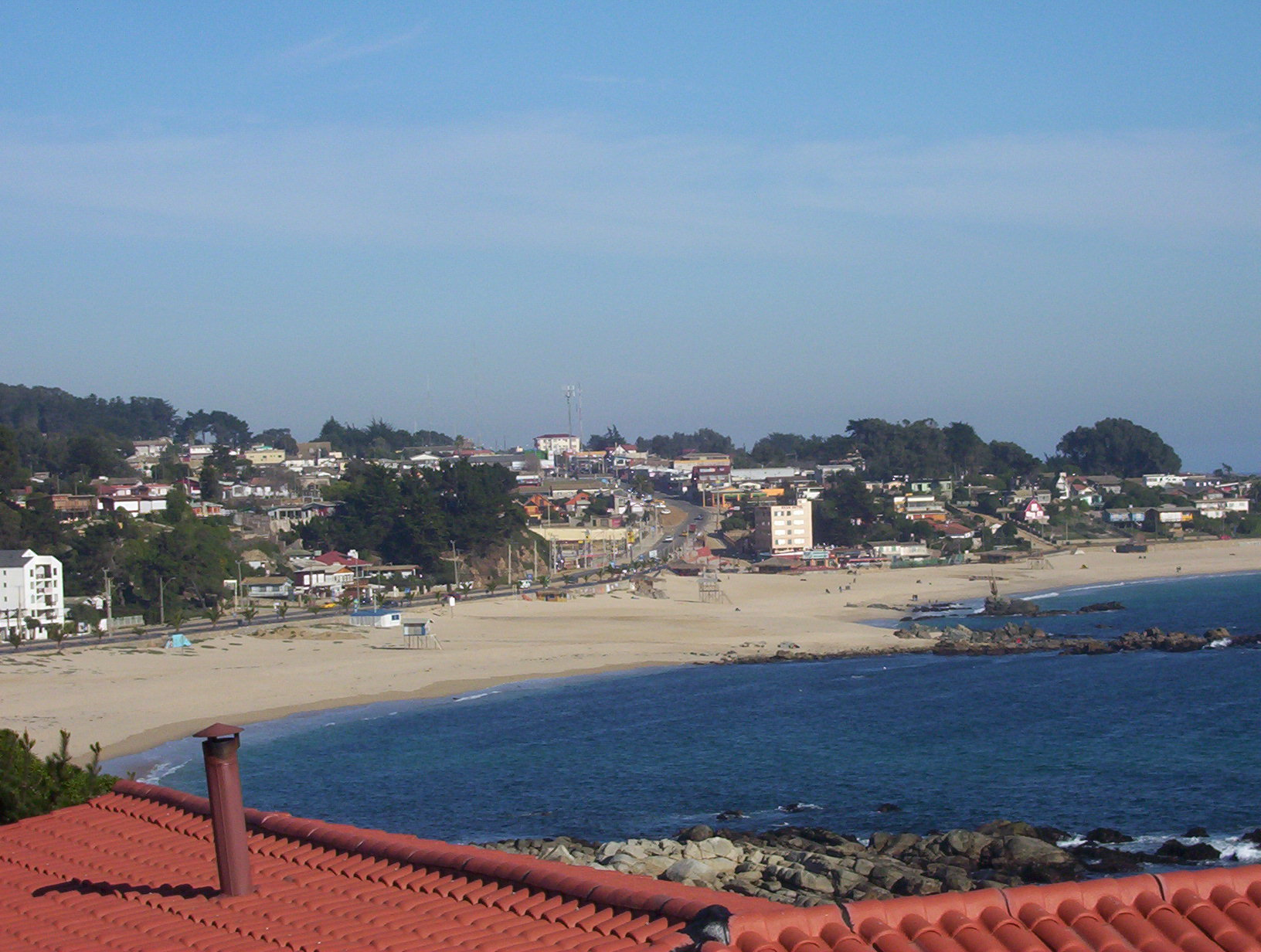
Quisco beach

More recently Picunche people lived between two important rivers: the Choapa and the Itata. They were farmers and thus sedentary, growing gourds, maize, beans and chili pepper. Water was abundant where they lived, and the climate was hot. They raised animals, especially llamas and guanacos, which provided meat for food and wool for clothes. They lived in small villages, in groups of approximately 300 people. Their houses were made of mud, with roofs of totora. About 30 people lived in each house: a father, wives, children, and other close relatives. Men gave the orders and directed the work: the highest authority was the father and after him the oldest son. Only in emergencies, especially in wars, was there a chief as a leader. Nevertheless, the villages were peaceful.

=== Inca period ===
Banner of the Qulla Suyu

The area was part of the Inca Empire, specifically of Qullasuyu. To assure their domination and introduce Inca customs, Inca sovereigns established numerous colonies of mitimaes, farmers and peaceful craftsmen brought from diverse parts of the empire: Aymara, Quechua and Atacameño. These foreign settlers founded numerous villages with names that recall their places of origin: Limache (people of Rímac or Lima), Collahue (place of the Qulla people or Aymara people), Pomaire and different people of Atacameño origin.

The clothes of Inca soldiers were made from Pulla Pulla (Zephyranthes párvula Killip), an annual plant of the family Amaryllidaceae, native to the highland Andean provinces, with beautiful flowers that bloom in spring. This bloom is considered an omen of whether the agricultural year would be good or bad. The route from Limache to Las Dichas passed through Lo Orozco, continuing to Portezuelo de Ibacache and finishing at Talagante, where other Mitimae existed. In 1430, Túpac Inca Yupanqui initiated a great military campaign that culminated in the establishment of a border at the Maule river. Ilabe, an Inca noble who commanded the invading forces, established himself in the Picunche Llollehue valley, between the Maipo river and the Mapocho river. He decided to found a colony and a pucará, a task he entrusted to his son, Tala Canta Ilabe.

He had the authority to name kurakas or governors, derived from that of the Inca in Cusco. His mandate allowed him to establish the social, political and economic system characteristic of the Inca Empire, to distribute land and community property, and initiate public works for the common good, like roads, granaries and housing. Agricultural and cattle production was sufficiently developed to allow food exports to the pukaras of the north.

=== Spanish settlement ===
The first indications of Spanish colonization in the El Quisco area date to 1570, when the Spanish family of Alonso de Córdoba took control. Previously it was named Huallilemu (Mapudungun: forest of oakwood), and then El Totoral after the many totoras there.

==== Pirates ====
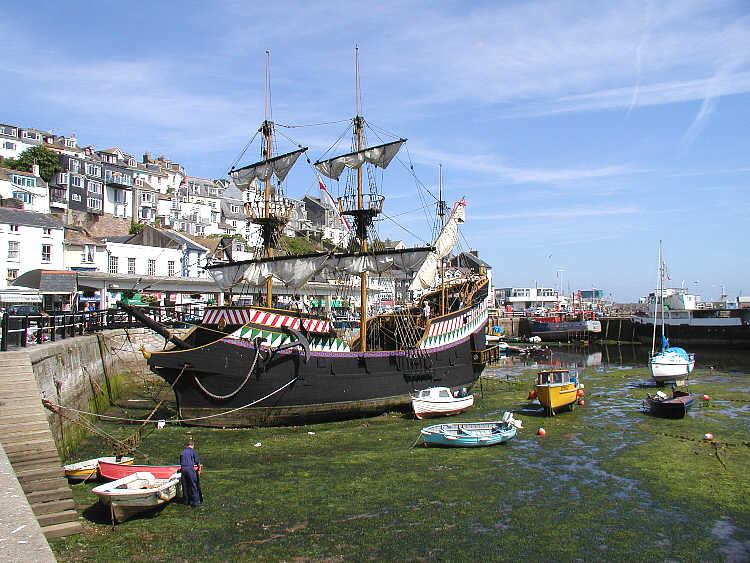
A replica of Golden Hind

After 1578, El Quisco and nearby places became bolt holes for pirates such as the Englishmen Francis Drake, Thomas Cavendish, and Richard Hawkins and Dutchmen like Oliver Van Noort and Joris van Spilbergen. Francis Drake probably moored his galleon the Golden Hind in the bay in December 1578. He travelled with two people known only by their Christian names, Christopher and Cosmas, the first Japanese explorers to circumnavigate the globe.

At the end of the colonial era, many foreign ships already engaged in illegal trade on the Chilean coast, including English, Dutch, French and American pirates. The foreign pirates generally operated with the support of Chilean Creoles, born in Chile but of European descent, saw the attempts of the Spanish authorities to interfere as one more proof of the arrogance of the colonial Spanish system.

=== Today ===
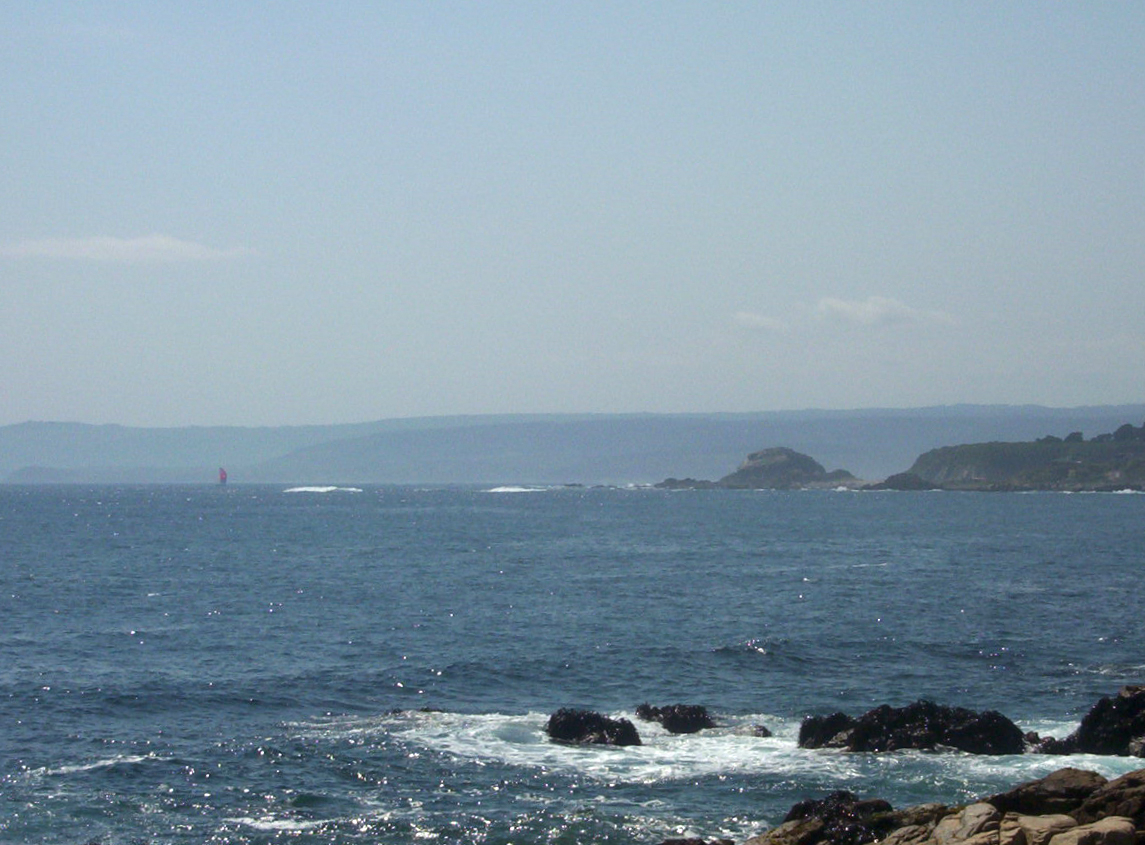
View north, towards the Peñablanca cape at El Canelo from El Quisco.

The commune of El Quisco was incorporated on August 30, 1956, under the presidency of Carlos Ibáñez del Campo under Statutory order Nº 12110.

== Demographics ==
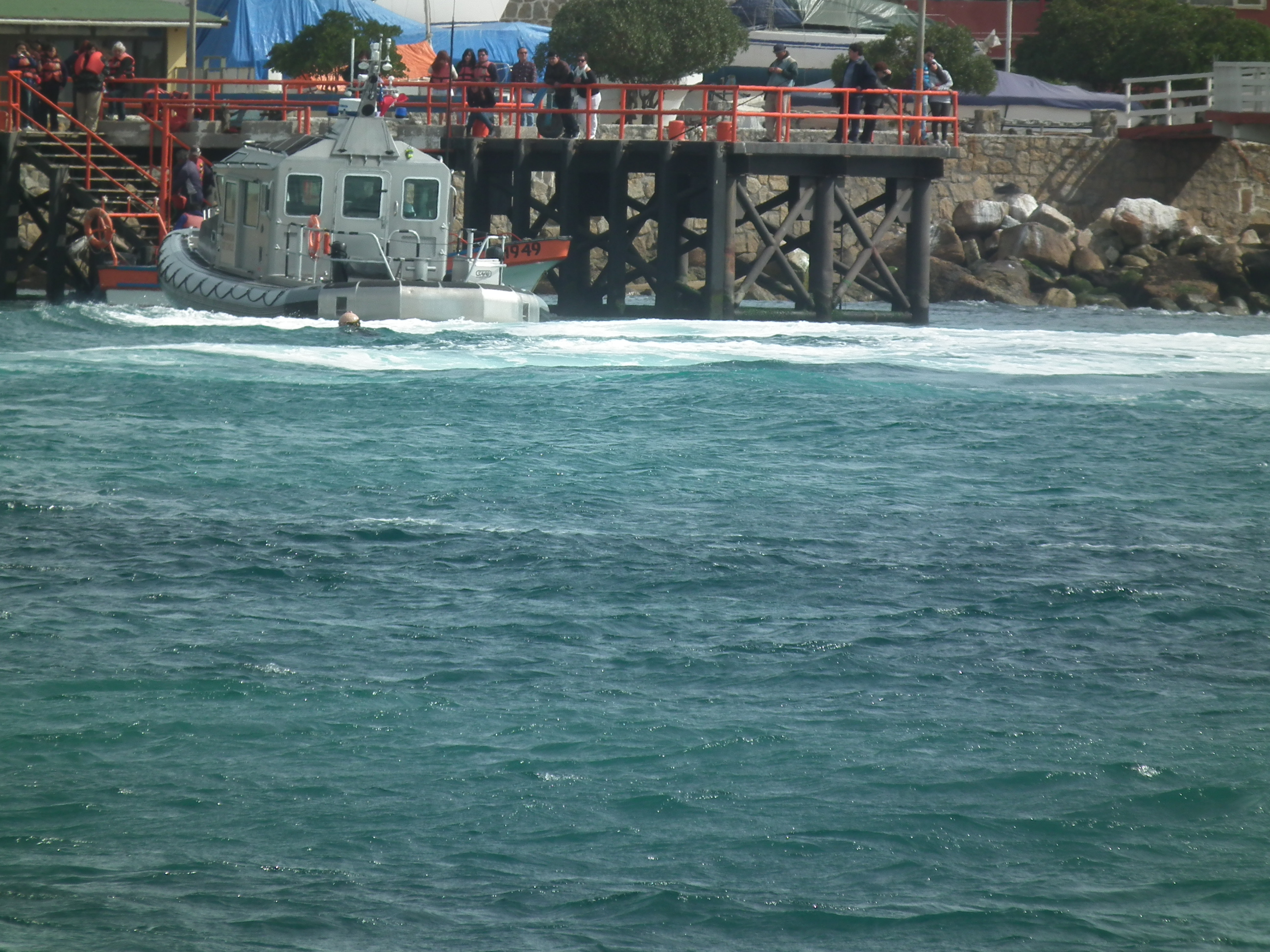
Defender class boat docking in a dock at El Quisco, Chile

According to the 2002 census of the National Statistics Institute, El Quisco spans an area of 50.7 km^{2} (20 sq mi) and has 9,467 inhabitants (4,815 men and 4,652 women). Of these, 8,931 (94.3%) lived in urban areas and 536 (5.7%) in rural areas. The population grew by 55.3% (3,370 persons) between the 1992 and 2002 censuses.

== Administration ==
As a commune, El Quisco is a third-level administrative division of Chile administered by a municipal council, headed by an alcalde who is directly elected every four years. The 2008-2012 alcalde is Natalia Carrasco Pizarro.

- Cristofer Ceballos Lira (UDI)
- Juan Andrés Berrios Olmedo (PPD)
- José Moraga Lira (RN)
- Maria Magdalena Bianchi Berroeta (PDC)
- Guillermo Romo Díaz (JPM)
- Guillermo Vidal Devia (UDI)

Within the electoral divisions of Chile, El Quisco is represented in the Chamber of Deputies by María José Hoffmann (UDI) and Víctor Torres (PDC) as part of the 15th electoral district, together with San Antonio, Santo Domingo, Cartagena, El Tabo, Algarrobo and Casablanca. The commune is represented in the Senate by Francisco Chahuán Chahuán (RN) and Ricardo Lagos Weber (PPD) as part of the 6th senatorial constituency (Valparaíso-Coast).

== Description ==
El Quisco has four sectors that are both geographically and culturally distinct:

- El Quisco proper
- Punta de Tralca
- Isla Negra
- El Totoral

== Tourism ==
The area is a favourite tourist destination in central Chile. One of its advantages is its short distance from Santiago. There are many residences and hotels for lodging, as well as many restaurants and inns for enjoying typical Chilean food. Marine sports are available, including scuba diving and swimming.

== Famous inhabitants ==
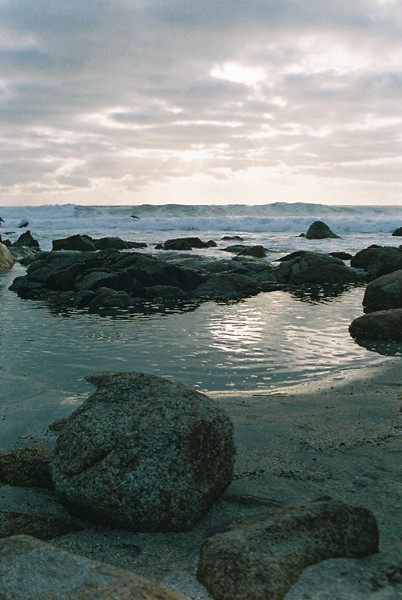
Playa Las Conchitas beach

- Pablo Neruda, winner of the Nobel Prize of Literature
- Violeta Parra, singer and composer. Parra spent long seasons at Isla Negra, where she created works such as "El Rin de Angelito".
- Enrique Silva Cimma, ex-foreign minister of Chile
- Clara Solovera (1909–1992), folklorist. Her daughters Cecilia and Marcela spread her ashes in the sea across from her house in El Quisco.
- René Ríos Boettiger, Chilean cartoonist, creator of Condorito.
- Camilo Mori, painter who designed the official seal of the city of El Quisco
- Sonia Tschorne, vice-minister of Housing, Urbanism and National Assets
- Osvaldo Puccio, politician
- Christian von Wernich, priest and collaborator with the Argentinian dictatorship who took refuge in El Quisco's Catholic church until he was identified in 2003.
