= Clara Solovera =

Chilean folk musician and composer

Clara Solovera (May 15, 1909 – January 27, 1992) was a famous Chilean folk musician and composer. She was Chile's most popular folk music composer in the early 1960s.
