= San Antonio Province =

San Antonio Province Provincia de San Antonio
- Province
- Seal

- Location in the Valparaíso Region

- Location in Chile
- Coordinates: 33°39′S 71°31′W
- Country: Chile
- Region: Valparaíso
- Capital: San Antonio
- Communes: List of 6: Algarrobo; El Quisco; El Tabo; Cartagena; San Antonio; Santo Domingo

Government
  - Type: Provincial
  - Presidential Provincial Delegate: Caroline Sireau Guajardo (Comunes)

Area
  - Total: 1,511.6 km^{2} (583.6 sq mi)
  - Rank: 5

Population (2012 Census)
  - Total: 144,220
  - Rank: 4
  - Density: 95.409/km^{2} (247.11/sq mi)
  - Urban: 125,637
  - Rural: 10,957

Sex
  - Men: 67,771
  - Women: 68,823
- Time zone: UTC-4 (CLT)
  - Summer (DST): UTC-3 (CLST)
- Area code: country 56 + area 35
- Website: Delegation of San Antonio

San Antonio Province (Spanish: Provincia de San Antonio) is one of eight provinces of the central Chilean region of Valparaíso (V). Its capital is the port city of San Antonio (pop. 87,205).

== Administration ==
As a province, San Antonio is a second-level administrative division, governed by a provincial delegate who is appointed by the president.

=== Communes ===
The province comprises six communes, each governed by a municipality consisting of an alcalde and municipal council:

- Algarrobo
- El Quisco
- El Tabo
- Cartagena
- San Antonio (capital)
- Santo Domingo

== Geography and demography ==
The province spans a coastal area of 1,511.6 km^{2} (584 sq mi) . According to the 2002 census, San Antonio Province had a population of 136,594, making it the fourth most populous province in the region. At that time, the population was 267,022 inhabitant with 125,637 people living in urban areas, 10,957 people living in rural areas, 67,771 men and 68,823 women.

== San Antonio Valley wine region ==
San Antonio Valley is a small wine region known for producing Pinot Noir, Sauvignon Blanc and Chardonnay. It is located very close to the sea around the city of San Antonio, Chile, south of the Casablanca Valley and only 55 miles (90 km) west of Santiago. As in other Chilean wine regions, like the Casablanca Valley, San Antonio is highly influenced by the cooling effect of the Pacific Ocean which makes wine production possible in this area. Soils are in the valley are granitic, poor and well drained with a topsoil of clay, providing a good substrate for vines. Rains are concentrated mainly in the winter season and the vineyards require drop irrigation for the rest of the year, using water from the Maipo River. The San Antonio Valley is seen as an up-and-coming wine region and the wine industry is expected to continue growing in the future.

=== Grape distribution by varietal ===
- Climate: Cool Mediterranean climate strongly influenced by the sea. 540 mm (21.2 in) of rain per year.
- Soils: clay and sandy soils.
- Primary grapes: Chardonnay, Pinot Noir, Sauvignon Blanc.

Syrah: 52 ha (128 acres)	Sauvignon Blanc: 957 ha (2365 acres)	Chardonnay: 345 ha (853 acres)	Pinot Noir: 374 ha (924 acres)

- Total hectares planted: 1728 ha (4270 acres).

== See also ==
- Chilean wine
- Maipo River
- San Antonio, Chile
