= San Antonio, Chile =

City and main freight port of Chile

San Antonio
- City and commune
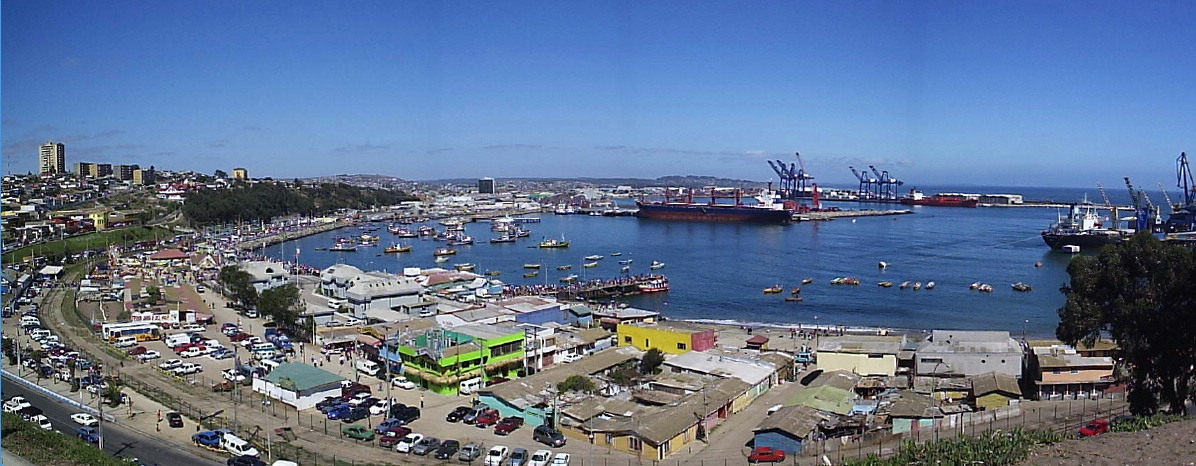
- Panorama of the port of San Antonio, before the construction of a mall which obstructed the view of the port.

- Coat of arms Location in Chile
- Nickname: Principal Port (Puerto Principal)
- Coordinates (city): 33°35′36″S 71°37′18″W
- Country: Chile
- Region: Valparaíso
- Province: San Antonio
- Founded: 1894

Government
  - Type: Municipality
  - Alcalde: Constanza Lizana

Area
  - Total: 404.5 km^{2} (156.2 sq mi)
- Elevation: 4 m (13 ft)

Population (2012 Census)
  - Total: 87,675
  - Density: 216.7/km^{2} (561.4/sq mi)
  - Urban: 83,435
  - Rural: 3,770
- Demonym: Sanantonian

Sex
  - Men: 42,843
  - Women: 44,362
- Time zone: UTC-4 (Chile Time (CLT))
  - Summer (DST): UTC-3 (Chile Summer Time (CLST))
- Area code: +56 35
- Climate: Csa
- Website: Official website (in Spanish)

San Antonio is a Chilean port city, commune, and the capital of the San Antonio Province in the Valparaíso Region. It has become the main freight port in Chile, surpassing Valparaíso in the 21st century. San Antonio is also the hub of the fishing area that stretches along the Chilean coast from Rocas de Santo Domingo to Cartagena.

== Geography ==
The city is situated on hills and coastal dunes, to the north of the Maipo River's mouth, and is divided by two estuaries: Arévalo to the north and El Sauce in the Llolleo section. It is located at 33°35′S and 71°37′W and borders Cartagena to the north, Melipilla and the Maipo River to the east, Santo Domingo and San Pedro to the south, and the Pacific Ocean to the west. It covers an area of 502.5 km2 (194 sq mi).

=== Climate ===
San Antonio has a Mediterranean climate (Köppen climate classification Csb) with coastal influences and an average annual temperature of 14 °C (57 °F). In January, the average temperature is 19 °C (66 °F), while in July, it is 8.2 °C (46.8 °F). The city receives an annual precipitation of 570 mm (22 in), with most of it concentrated in June, which averages 134 mm (5 in).

Climate data for San Antonio, Chile (1991–2020, extremes 1966–present)
Month	Jan	Feb	Mar	Apr	May	Jun	Jul	Aug	Sep	Oct	Nov	Dec	Year
Record high °C (°F)	33.7 (92.7)	33.0 (91.4)	31.4 (88.5)	28.0 (82.4)	30.6 (87.1)	24.4 (75.9)	29.2 (84.6)	29.9 (85.8)	29.1 (84.4)	29.7 (85.5)	32.0 (89.6)	31.5 (88.7)	33.7 (92.7)
Mean daily maximum °C (°F)	20.6 (69.1)	20.5 (68.9)	19.8 (67.6)	18.4 (65.1)	16.8 (62.2)	15.5 (59.9)	14.9 (58.8)	15.6 (60.1)	16.4 (61.5)	17.2 (63.0)	18.4 (65.1)	19.6 (67.3)	17.8 (64.0)
Daily mean °C (°F)	16.0 (60.8)	15.8 (60.4)	14.9 (58.8)	13.3 (55.9)	12.1 (53.8)	11.0 (51.8)	10.1 (50.2)	10.6 (51.1)	11.3 (52.3)	12.1 (53.8)	13.4 (56.1)	14.8 (58.6)	12.9 (55.2)
Mean daily minimum °C (°F)	11.3 (52.3)	11.1 (52.0)	10.1 (50.2)	8.1 (46.6)	7.4 (45.3)	6.4 (43.5)	5.3 (41.5)	5.7 (42.3)	6.3 (43.3)	7.0 (44.6)	8.3 (46.9)	10.1 (50.2)	8.1 (46.6)
Record low °C (°F)	3.0 (37.4)	2.8 (37.0)	1.0 (33.8)	−1.0 (30.2)	−2.4 (27.7)	−2.5 (27.5)	−3.1 (26.4)	−2.4 (27.7)	−3.2 (26.2)	−1.2 (29.8)	0.4 (32.7)	0.4 (32.7)	−3.2 (26.2)
Average precipitation mm (inches)	0.3 (0.01)	2.4 (0.09)	4.2 (0.17)	20.5 (0.81)	77.3 (3.04)	122.0 (4.80)	74.7 (2.94)	68.3 (2.69)	29.8 (1.17)	14.5 (0.57)	4.8 (0.19)	3.8 (0.15)	422.6 (16.64)
Average precipitation days (≥ 1.0 mm)	0.1	0.2	0.6	1.6	4.2	6.7	5.3	4.6	2.7	1.4	0.6	0.5	28.4
Mean monthly sunshine hours	264.3	219.4	209.7	179.3	134.6	120.7	147.1	171.6	190.6	228.2	251.3	261.6	2,378.6
Source 1: Dirección Meteorológica de Chile
Source 2: NOAA (precipitation days, sun 1991–2020)

== History ==
Nomadic hunters and gatherers were the first inhabitants of Chilean territory. In this central coastal zone are evidences of ancient habitation extending back about thirteen thousand years.

Eighty percent of the city was destroyed by the 1985 Santiago earthquake.

The San Antonio port was shut down by the 27 February 2010 earthquake, but had resumed operation at 80% capacity by 3 March 2010. After the quake, only 5 of the 8 docking points at the port resumed operation.

== Demographics ==
According to the 2002 census of the National Statistics Institute, San Antonio spans an area of 404.5 km^{2} (156 sq mi) and has 87,205 inhabitants (42,843 men and 44,362 women). Of these, 83,435 (95.7%) lived in urban areas and 3,770 (4.3%) in rural areas. The population grew by 11.6% (9,047 persons) between the 1992 and 2002 censuses.

== Administration ==
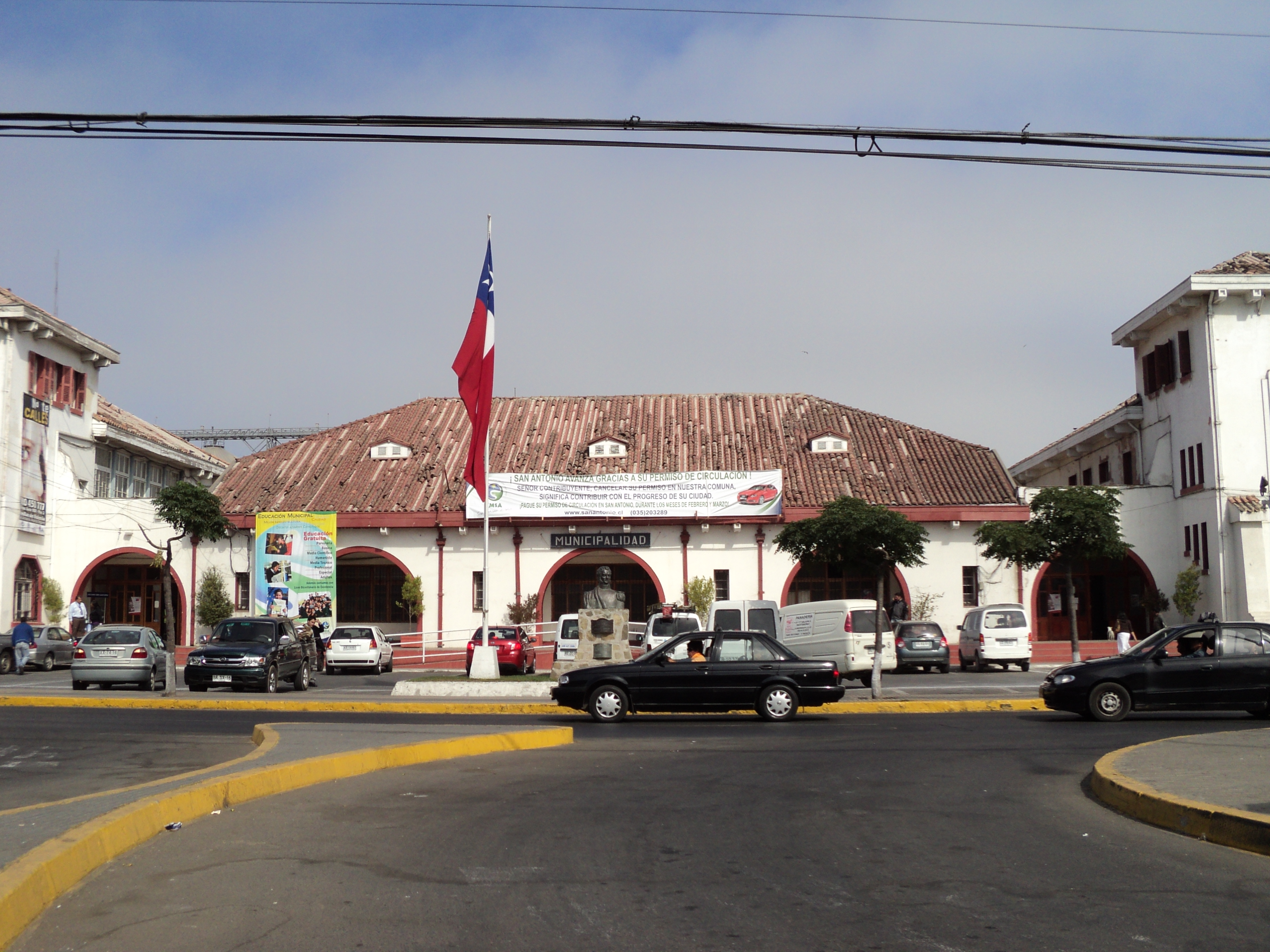
Partial view of the facade of the Illustrious Municipality of San Antonio.

As a commune, San Antonio is a third-level administrative division of Chile administered by a communal council, headed by an alcalde who is directly elected every four years. The 2008-2012 alcalde is Omar Vera Castro, who is advised by six councilors:

- Pedro Piña Mateluna (PC)
- Ramón Silva Suazo (PDC)
- Danilo Rojas Barahona (RN)
- Fernando Núñez Michellod (PS)
- Jose Martinez Fuentes (Ind., Concert of Parties for Democracy)
- Omar Morales Márquez (PRSD)

Within the electoral divisions of Chile, San Antonio is represented in the Chamber of Deputies by María José Hoffmann (UDI) and Víctor Torres (PDC) as part of the 15th electoral district, (together with Santo Domingo, Cartagena, El Tabo, El Quisco, Algarrobo and Casablanca). The commune is represented in the Senate by Francisco Chahuán Chahuán (RN) and Ricardo Lagos Weber (PPD) as part of the 6th senatorial constituency (Valparaíso-Coast).

== Tourism ==
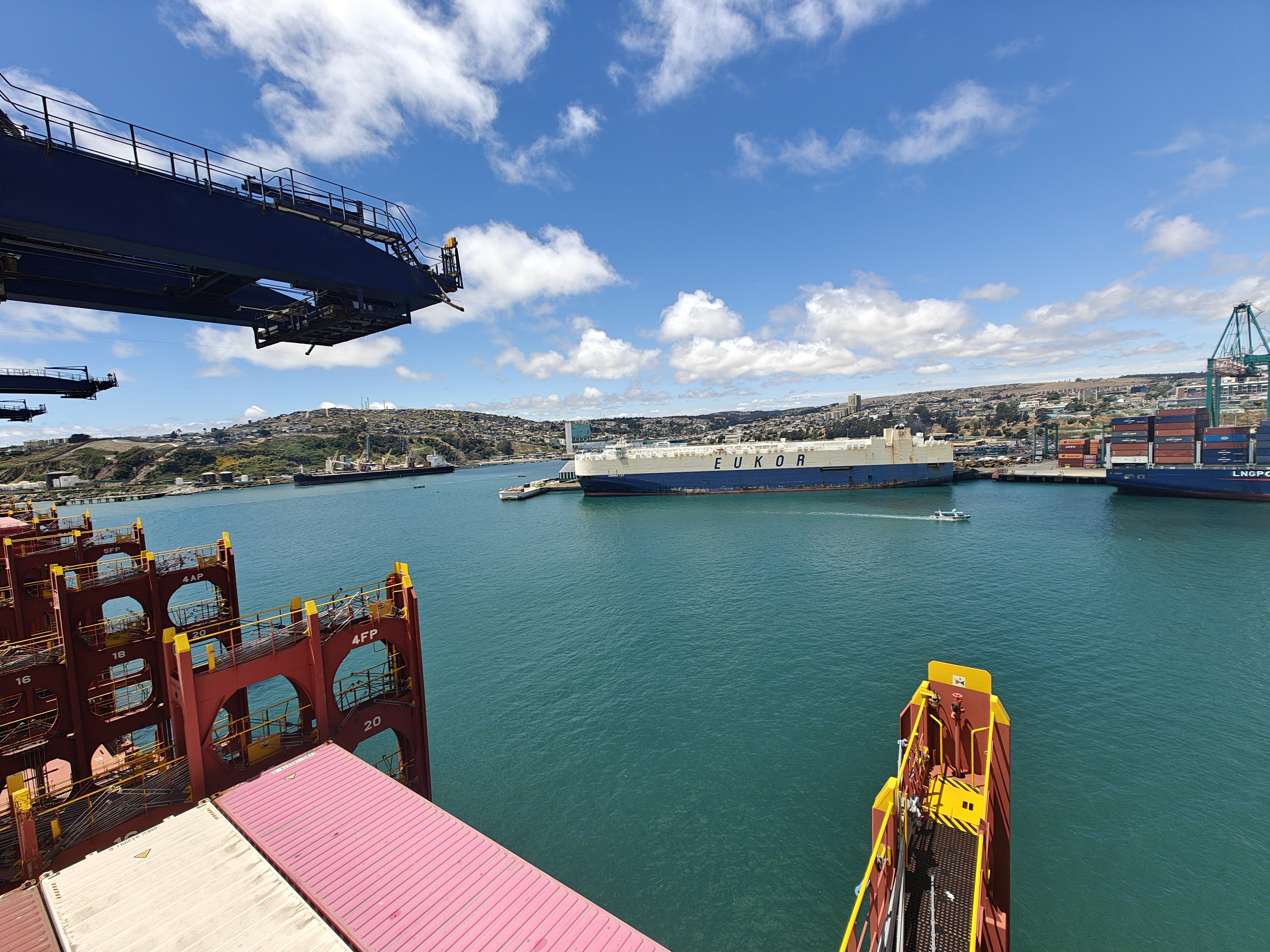
The zone will give way to a tourist route that will have cuisine, with the emerging cuisine being based on shellfish and oenology. This initiative is supported by a program called The Seaboard Program of the Poets supported by CORFO, or in Spanish "el programa litoral de los Poetas de la CORFO." The new route explains that it will unite the circuit to the local productions, chefs and wine vineyards, like the vineyards of Matetic, Casa Marín, Amayna, Lo Abarca, and Malvilla. Also, with the support from the Program of Tourism and Interests by CORFO, in the last year, wine growers, food industries, and tourism have initiated a process of trainings and associations under the concept of a good cuisine being the local identity.

The region is developing a tourist route focused on local cuisine, with an emphasis on seafood and oenology. This initiative is supported by a program called "The Seaboard of the Poets," backed by CORFO (Chile's Economic Development Agency). The new route aims to connect local production, chefs, and vineyards, including well-known wineries like Matetic, Casa Marín, Amayna, Lo Abarca, and Malvilla.

Additionally, with the support of CORFO's Tourism and Industry Program, local winegrowers, food producers, and the tourism sector have been working together over the past year. They have initiated training and collaborative efforts under the concept that quality cuisine is an essential part of the region's identity.

=== Tourist Attractions ===
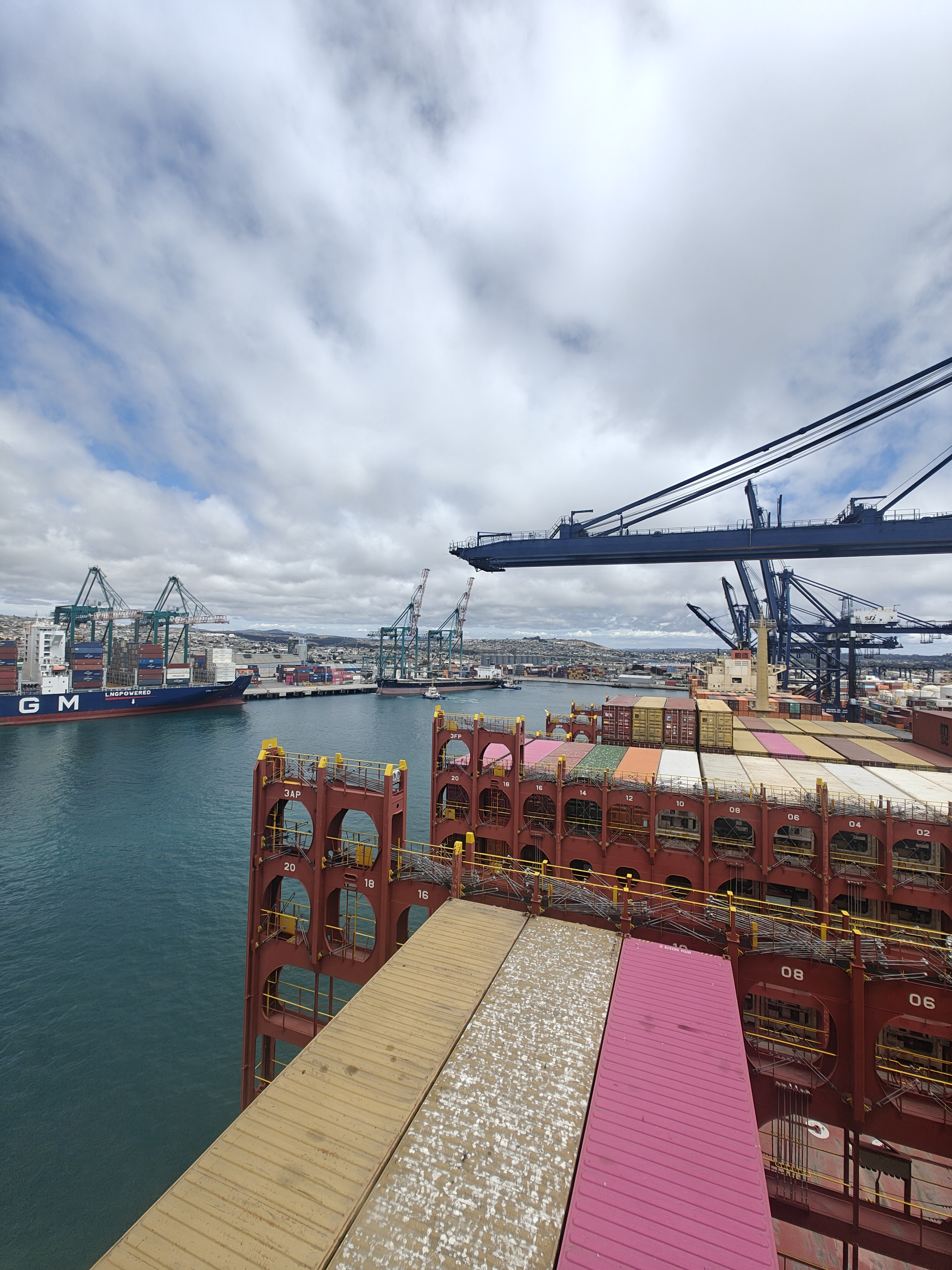
On the seaside of the city of San Antonio there is a walk called "el Paseo Bellamar" (the beautiful sea walk), a mall called “Mall Arauco San Antonio", and a casino called "el Casino del Pacífico" (the casino of the Pacific), where you can see the merchant ships, and the activities of fishermen and the port workers. From here and in the cove called "la caleta Pintor Pacheco Altamarino" (the cove of the painter Pacheco Altamarino), tours are offered in boats through the bay of the port and in the San Antonio fishing market fish and shellfish are sold. There is also a national monument called "Grúa 82" where it is possible to observe seals in the rock piles of the sector. Another attraction is the Municipal Museum of Natural Sciences and Archaeology of San Antonio, with its collections principally dedicated to the natives that lived in the zone of the central sea of Chile, and the wildlife in the area. This museum contains huge skeletons of sea mammals, among those is the blue whale, a garden with natural species, aquariums, and the rescue and rehabilitation center of wild fauna. Another important attraction is the panoramic viewpoint on the hill of Cristo del Maipo (Christ of Maipo), the hill of Centinela, and the viewpoint of 21 May.

In the sector of Llolleo, you can find the parade ground, also known as "La Plaza del Folclor" (The Plaza of Folklore), and the hill viewpoint of "Cristo del Maipo" (Christ of Maipo).

The handcrafting town of Lo Gallardo, is also an important attraction; the Maipo river, with an impressive river mouth that starts at fisherman's cove; the Leyda reservoir with abundant aquatic birds; and the small village of Cuncumén, a typical Chilean country town on the side of the Maipo river.
