= Algarrobo, Chile =

Commune in central Chile

Algarrobo
- Commune
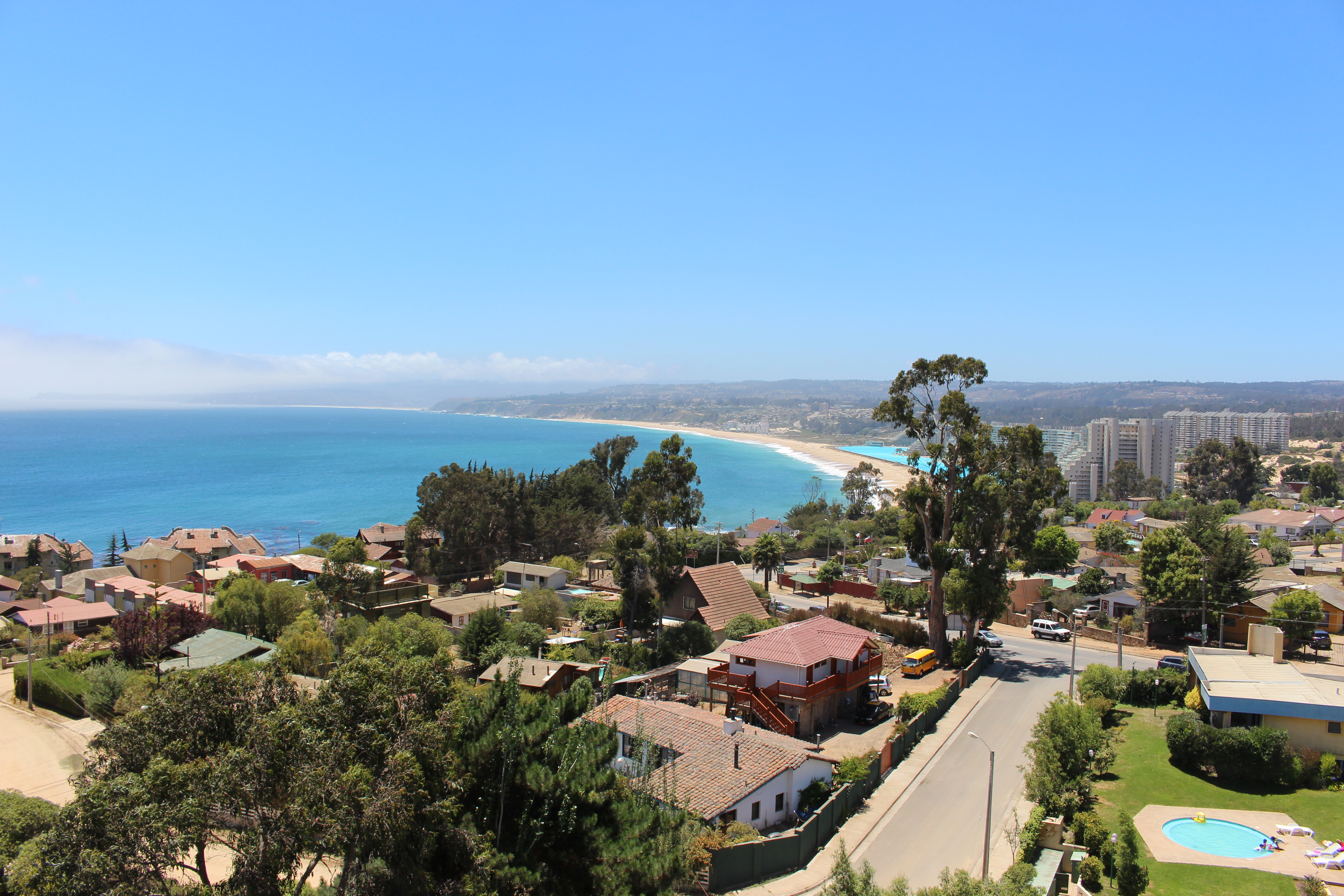

- Coat of arms Location in Chile
- Coordinates (city): 33°23′28″S 71°41′34″W
- Country: Chile
- Region: Valparaíso
- Province: San Antonio

Government
  - Type: Municipality
  - Mayor: Marco González (RN)

Area
  - Total: 175.6 km^{2} (67.8 sq mi)
- Elevation: 13 m (43 ft)

Population (2012 Census)
  - Total: 10,217
  - Density: 58.18/km^{2} (150.7/sq mi)
  - Urban: 6,628
  - Rural: 1,973

Sex
  - Men: 4,369
  - Women: 4,232
- Time zone: UTC-4 (CLT)
  - Summer (DST): UTC-3 (CLST)
- Area code: (+56) 35
- Website: Municipality of Algarrobo

Algarrobo (Spanish pronunciation: [alɣaˈroβo]) is a Chilean city and commune in San Antonio Province, Valparaíso Region. Located on the country's central coast, it is a popular summer resort for the population of Santiago. It is an upscale community near El Quisco and Valparaíso. The San Alfonso del Mar resort, located north of the city, is home to the world's largest outdoor pool.

Islote Pájaros Niños is a nature sanctuary on a rocky islet close to the shore, which is home to colonies of Humboldt penguins, Peruvian pelicans, and Guanay cormorants.

== Demographics ==
According to the 2002 census of the National Statistics Institute, Algarrobo spans an area of 175.6 km^{2} (68 sq mi) and has 8,601 inhabitants (4,369 men and 4,232 women). Of these, 6,628 (77.1%) lived in urban areas and 1,973 (22.9%) lived in rural areas. The population grew by 44.1% (2,633 persons) between the 1992 and 2002 censuses.

== Administration ==
As a commune, Algarrobo is a third-level administrative division of Chile administered by a municipal council, headed by a mayor who is directly elected every four years. The mayor since December 2023 has been Marco González (RN). The 2024–2028 municipal council has the following members:

- José Olivo (REP)
- Luis Núñez (RN)
- José Luis Rojas (Ind./UDI)
- Carol Velásquez (Ind./DC)
- Jessica García (Ind./DC)
- María Vidal (FA)

Within the electoral divisions of Chile, Algarrobo is represented in the Chamber of Deputies by María José Hoffmann (UDI) and Víctor Torres (PDC) as part of the 15th electoral district (together with San Antonio, Santo Domingo, Cartagena, El Tabo, El Quisco and Casablanca). The commune is represented in the Senate by Francisco Chahuán Chahuán (RN) and Ricardo Lagos Weber (PPD) as part of the 6th senatorial constituency (Valparaíso-Coast).
