= Santo Domingo, Chile =

Santo Domingo
- City and Commune
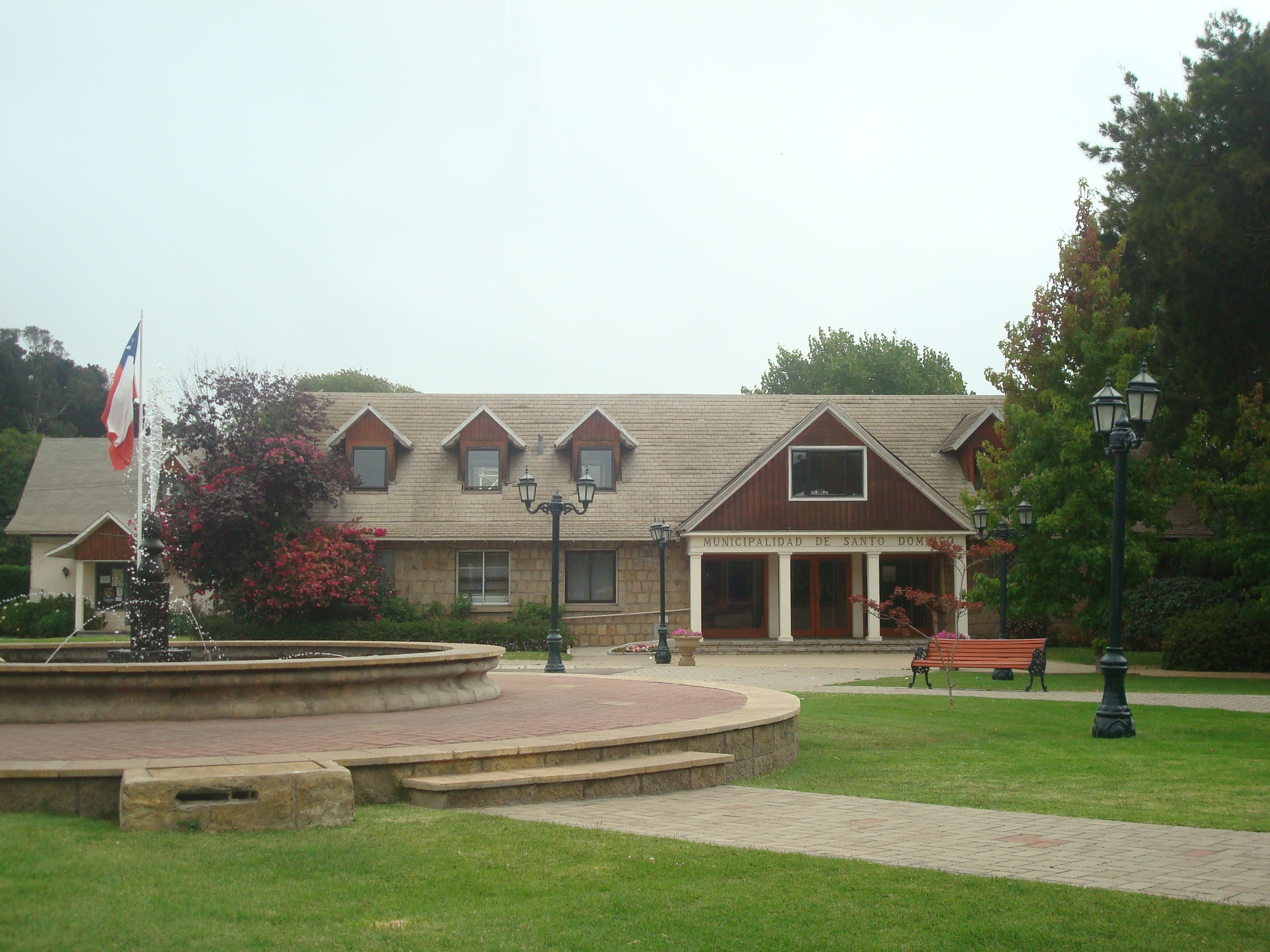
- Municipalidad Santo Domingo

- Location in Chile
- Coordinates (city): 33°38′09″S 71°37′41″W
- Country: Chile
- Region: Valparaíso
- Province: San Antonio Province

Government
  - Type: Municipality
  - Alcalde: Dino Lolito (RN)

Area
  - Total: 536.1 km^{2} (207.0 sq mi)
- Elevation: 66 m (217 ft)

Population (2012 Census)
  - Total: 8,860
  - Density: 16.5/km^{2} (42.8/sq mi)
  - Urban: 4,737
  - Rural: 2,681

Sex
  - Men: 3,811
  - Women: 3,607
- Time zone: UTC-4 (CLT)
  - Summer (DST): UTC-3 (CLST)
- Area code: (+56) 35
- Website: Municipality of Santo Domingo

Santo Domingo is a Chilean coastal city and commune in San Antonio Province, Valparaíso Region. It was founded as Rocas de Santo Domingo (St. Dominic's Rocks).

== Demographics ==
According to the 2002 census of the National Statistics Institute, Santo Domingo spans an area of 536.1 km^{2} (207 sq mi) and has 7,418 inhabitants (3,811 men and 3,607 women). Of these, 4,737 (63.9%) lived in urban areas and 2,681 (36.1%) in rural areas. The population grew by 19.3% (1,200 persons) between the 1992 and 2002 censuses.

== Administration ==
As a commune, Santo Domingo is a third-level administrative division of Chile administered by a municipal council, headed by an alcalde who is directly elected every four years. The 2008-2012 alcalde was Fernando Rodríguez Larraín.

Within the electoral divisions of Chile, Santo Domingo is represented in the Chamber of Deputies by María José Hoffmann (UDI) and Víctor Torres (PDC) as part of the 15th electoral district, (together with San Antonio, Cartagena, El Tabo, El Quisco, Algarrobo and Casablanca). The commune is represented in the Senate by Francisco Chahuán Chahuán (RN) and Ricardo Lagos Weber (PPD) as part of the 6th senatorial constituency (Valparaíso-Coast).

== See also ==
- El Yali National Reserve
