= El Tabo =

- Commune
- Location in Chile
- Coordinates: 33°27′31″S 71°39′43″W
- Country: Chile
- Region: Valparaíso
- Province: San Antonio

Government
  - Type: Municipality
  - Alcalde: Alfonso Muñoz (PS)

Area
  - Total: 98.8 km^{2} (38.1 sq mi)
- Elevation: 8 m (26 ft)

Population (2012 Census)
  - Total: 8,161
  - Density: 82.6/km^{2} (214/sq mi)
  - Urban: 6,604
  - Rural: 424

Sex
  - Men: 3,537
  - Women: 3,491
- Time zone: UTC-4 (CLT)
  - Summer (DST): UTC-3 (CLST)
- Area code: 56 + 35
- Website: www.eltabo.cl

El Tabo is a Chilean commune located in the San Antonio Province, Valparaíso Region. The commune spans an area of 98.8 km^{2} (38 sq mi). This town is a traditional beach for middle class families.

== Demographics ==
According to the 2002 census of the National Statistics Institute, El Tabo has 7,028 inhabitants (3,537 men and 3,491 women). Of these, 6,604 (94%) lived in urban areas and 424 (6%) in rural areas. The population grew by 55.7% (2,515 persons) between the 1992 and 2002 censuses.

=== Notable residents ===
- Nicanor Parra, poet (in Las Cruces area)

== Administration ==
As a commune, El Tabo is a third-level administrative division of Chile administered by a municipal council, headed by an alcalde who is directly elected every four years. The 2008-2012 alcalde is Emilio Jorquera Romero (PPD). The council has the following members:

- Edgardo Gómez Bravo (PPD)
- Fernando García Jofré (PDC)
- Osvaldo Román Arellano (UDI)
- Arturo Aravena Cisternas (RN)
- Richard Copier Garrido (PH)
- José Muñoz Osorio (PRSD)

Within the electoral divisions of Chile, El Tabo is represented in the Chamber of Deputies by María José Hoffmann (UDI) and Víctor Torres (PDC) as part of the 15th electoral district, (together with San Antonio, Santo Domingo, Cartagena, El Quisco, Algarrobo and Casablanca). The commune is represented in the Senate by Francisco Chahuán Chahuán (RN) and Ricardo Lagos Weber (PPD) as part of the 6th senatorial constituency (Valparaíso-Coast).
