= Cartagena, Chile =

Cartagena
- Commune
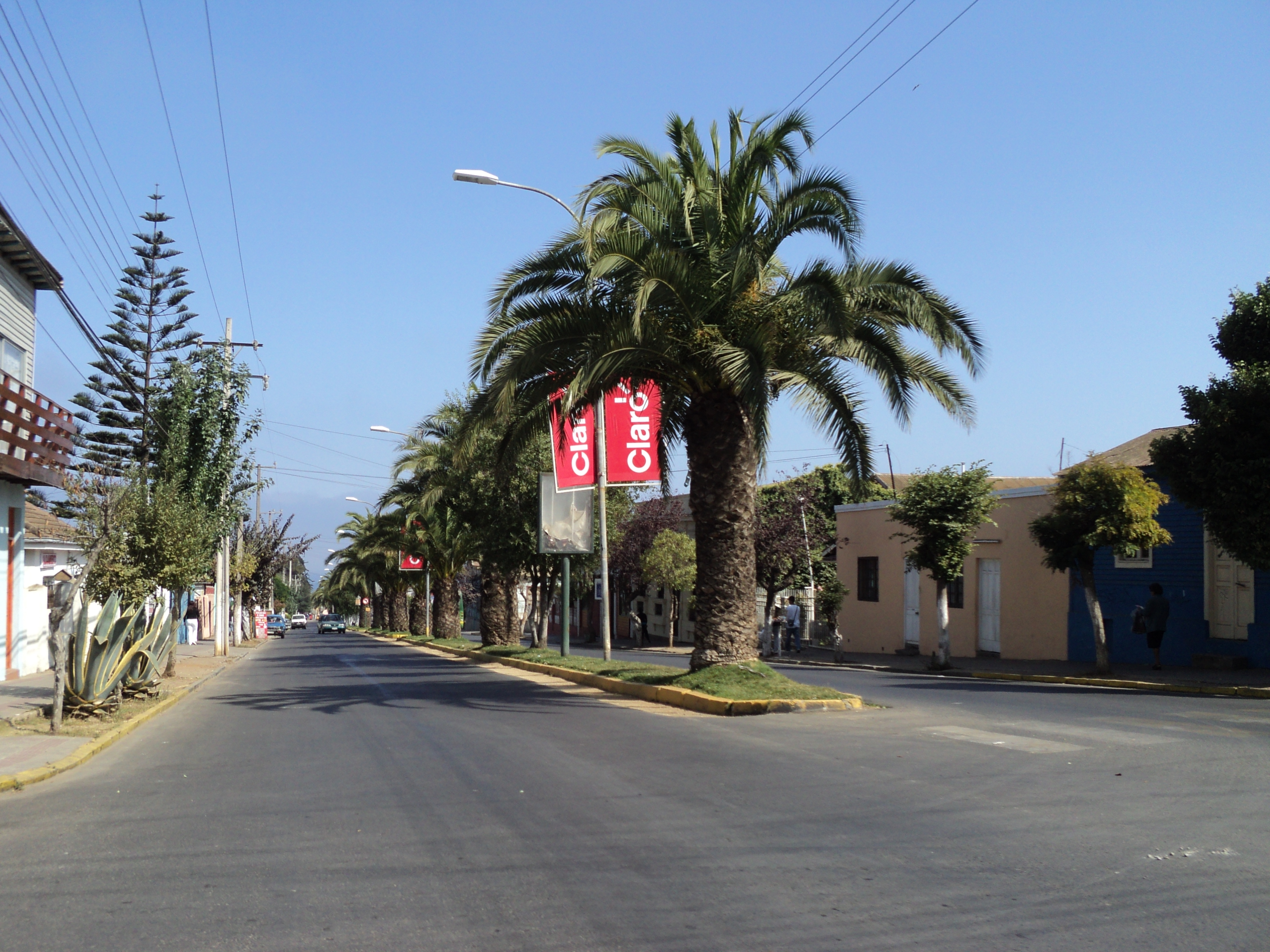

- Coat of arms Location in Chile
- Coordinates: 33°32′33″S 71°35′45″W
- Country: Chile
- Region: Valparaíso
- Province: San Antonio
- Founded: 1901

Government
  - Type: Municipality
  - Alcalde: Lidia Silva (PPD)

Area
  - Total: 245.9 km^{2} (94.9 sq mi)
- Elevation: 140 m (460 ft)

Population (2012 Census)
  - Total: 17,978
  - Density: 73.11/km^{2} (189.4/sq mi)
  - Urban: 15,302
  - Rural: 1,573

Sex
  - Men: 8,396
  - Women: 8,479
- Time zone: UTC-4 (CLT)
  - Summer (DST): UTC-3 (CLST)
- Area code: 56 + 35
- Website: Official website (in Spanish)

Cartagena is a Chilean commune located in the San Antonio Province, Valparaíso Region. The commune spans an area of 245.9 km^{2} (95 sq mi).

== History ==
In the seventeenth century the area surrounding the town became a major producer of wheat, which was shipped to Peru and Spain via the port of Cartagena.

From 1870, Cartagena became a popular residence for the Chilean intellectual elite who built holiday houses and made it a fashionable seaside resort. Cartagena acquired its status as a commune in 1901.

== Demographics ==
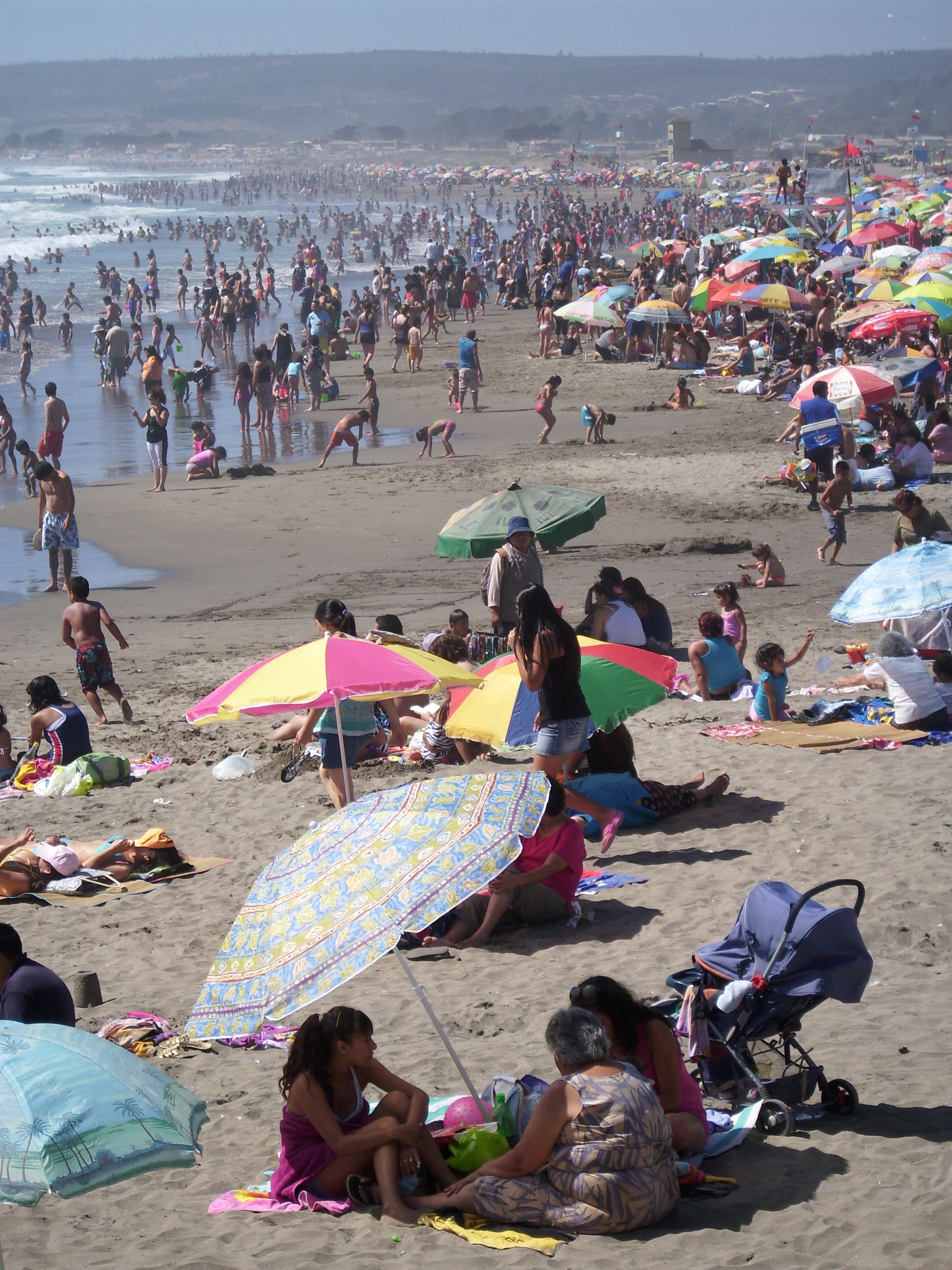
Playa Grande of Cartagena.

According to the 2002 census of the National Statistics Institute, Cartagena had 16,875 inhabitants; of these, 15,302 (90.7%) lived in urban areas and 1,573 (9.3%) in rural areas. At that time, there were 8,396 men and 8,479 women. Cartagena accounts for 1.10% of the regional population. The demonym for a man from Cartagena is Cartagenino and Cartagenina for a woman.

== Administration ==
As a commune, Cartagena is a third-level administrative division of Chile administered by a municipal council, headed by an alcalde who is directly elected every four years. The 2008-2012 alcalde is Oscaldo Cartegena Polanco (Independent). The council has the following members:

- Jesús Cartagena García (PDC)
- David Jiménez Mira (PRSD)
- Jaime Arriola Cortez (RN)
- Jorge Castro Retamal (RN)
- Teresa Olivares Alvarez (PDC)
- Juan Cárdenas Palacios (Ind./Pro-PPD)

Within the electoral divisions of Chile, Cartagena is represented in the Chamber of Deputies by María José Hoffmann (UDI) and Víctor Torres (PDC) as part of the 15th electoral district, (together with San Antonio, Santo Domingo, El Tabo, El Quisco, Algarrobo and Casablanca). The commune is represented in the Senate by Francisco Chahuán Chahuán (RN) and Ricardo Lagos Weber (PPD) as part of the 6th senatorial constituency (Valparaíso-Coast).
