= Casablanca, Chile =

Commune in central Chile

Casablanca
- Commune
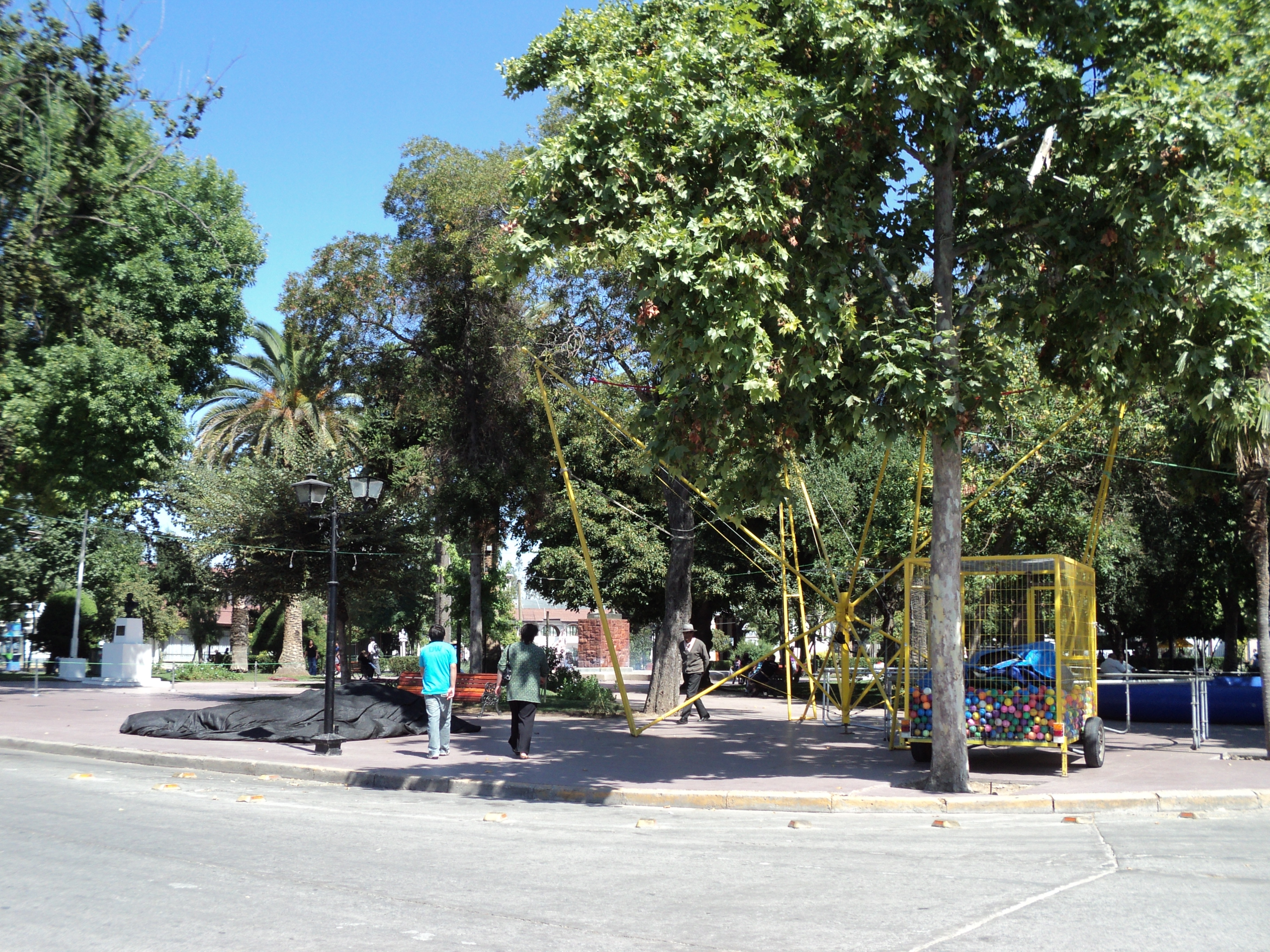
- Main square of Casablanca

- Flag Coat of arms Location in Chile
- Coordinates (city): 33°19′S 71°25′W
- Country: Chile
- Region: Valparaíso
- Province: Valparaíso
- Founded: 1753

Government
  - Type: Municipality
  - Mayor: Rodrigo Martínez (RN)

Area
  - Total: 952.5 km^{2} (367.8 sq mi)
- Elevation: 293 m (961 ft)

Population (2012 Census)
  - Total: 24,537
  - Density: 25.76/km^{2} (66.72/sq mi)
  - Urban: 15,209
  - Rural: 6,665
- Demonym(s): Casablanquino, -a

Sex
  - Men: 11,127
  - Women: 10,747
- Time zone: UTC-4 (CLT)
  - Summer (DST): UTC-3 (CLST)
- Area code: 56 + 32
- Website: Official website (in Spanish)

Casablanca (Spanish pronunciation: [kasaˈβlaŋka]), meaning "white house", is a Chilean city and commune located in Valparaíso Province, Valparaíso Region.

== Geography ==
The city of Casablanca is located on Route 68 between Santiago and the city of Valparaíso, at about 30 minutes southeast of Valparaíso and 50 minutes northwest of Santiago traveling by car. It is a region known for white wine grapes, especially Sauvignon blanc and Chardonnay. The commune of Casablanca spans an area of 952.5 km^{2} (368 sq mi).

== Demographics ==
According to the 2002 census of the National Statistics Institute, Casablanca spans an area of 952.5 km^{2} (368 sq mi) and has 21,874 inhabitants (11,127 men and 10,747 women). Of these, 15,209 (69.5%) lived in urban areas and 6,665 (30.5%) in rural areas. The population grew by 31.9% (5,284 persons) between the 1992 and 2002 censuses.

== Administration ==
As a commune, Casablanca is a third-level administrative division of Chile, administered by a municipal council, which is headed by a directly elected mayor. The 2024-2028 mayor is Rodrigo Martínez (RN), while the municipal council has the following members:

- Iván Durán (Ind./UDI)
- Felipe Molina (Ind./UDI)
- Manuel Vera (Ind./DC)
- Álex Santander (FA)
- José Manuel Cartagena (FA)
- Ilse Quezada (RN)

Within the electoral divisions of Chile, Casablanca belongs to the 15th electoral district and 6th senatorial constituency.

== Casablanca Valley wine region ==
The Casablanca Valley is a wine-producing region 75 km (47 mi) northwest of Santiago. It is a Denomination of Origin (DO) defined by the Chilean Appellation system, the legally defined and protected geographical indication used to identify where the grapes for a wine were grown. The valley takes its name from the commune of Casablanca and stretches roughly 30 km (19 miles) east-west from eastern border of the Valparaíso province in the Valparaíso region. Vines were first planted here in the mid-1980s during the revitalization of the Chilean wine industry and it quickly became known for its white wines, most notably Sauvignon Blanc and Chardonnay, as well as Pinot Noir, which thrives in its cooler climate. Although the valley is located at 33°S, much closer to the Equator than any European vineyard, viticulture here is possible because of the cooling influence of the Pacific Ocean, in the shape of cool morning fog and greater cloud cover than is found elsewhere in the north of Chile.

=== Grape distribution by varietal ===
- Climate: Cool Mediterranean climate with pronounced maritime influence. 540 mm (21.2 in) of rain per year.
- Soils: clay and sandy soils.
- Primary grapes: Chardonnay, Pinot Noir, Sauvignon Blanc.

Merlot: 391 ha (966 acres)	Syrah: 112 ha (277 acres)	Sauvignon Blanc: 1.950 ha (4819 acres)
Pinot Noir: 723 ha (1787 acres)	Malbec / Cot: 6 ha (15 acres)	Gewürztraminer: 65 ha (161 acres)
Riesling: 33 ha (82 acres)	Cabernet Franc: 13 ha (32 acres)	Viognier: 49 ha (121 acres)
Pinot Gris: 34 ha (84 acres)	Chardonnay: 2,269 ha (5607 acres)	

- Total hectares planted: 1,429 ha (3531 acres).

== Sister city relations ==
- (United States) – Napa, California, USA

== See also ==
- Colchagua Valley
- Maipo Valley
- Chilean wine
