= District 15 (Chamber of Deputies of Chile) =

Electoral district of the Chamber of Deputies of Chile

- Distrito 15
- Electoral District for the Chamber of Deputies
- Location of District 15 within Chile
- Commune: List: Codegua; Coinco; Coltauco; Doñihue; Graneros; Machalí; Malloa; Mostazal; Olivar; Quinta de Tilcoco; Rancagua; Rengo; Requínoa
- Region: O'Higgins
- Population: 540,700 (2017)
- Electorate: 445,363 (2021)
- Area: 5,790 km^{2} (2020)

Current Electoral District
- Created: 2017
- Seats: 5 (2017–present)
- Deputies: List: Marta González (Ind); Marcela Riquelme (Ind); Natalia Romero (Ind); Diego Schalper (RN); Raúl Soto (PPD)

District 15 (Spanish: Distrito 15) is one of the 28 multi-member electoral districts of the Chamber of Deputies, the lower house of the National Congress, the national legislature of Chile. The district was created by the 2015 electoral reform and came into being at the following general election in 2017. It consists of the communes of Codegua, Coinco, Coltauco, Doñihue, Graneros, Machalí, Malloa, Mostazal, Olivar, Quinta de Tilcoco, Rancagua, Rengo and Requínoa in the region of O'Higgins. The district currently elects five of the 155 members of the Chamber of Deputies using the open party-list proportional representation electoral system. At the 2021 general election the district had 445,363 registered electors.

== Electoral system ==
District 15 currently elects five of the 155 members of the Chamber of Deputies using the open party-list proportional representation electoral system. Parties may form electoral pacts with each other to pool their votes and increase their chances of winning seats. However, the number of candidates nominated by an electoral pact may not exceed the maximum number of candidates that a single party may nominate. Seats are allocated using the D'Hondt method.

== Election results ==
=== Summary ===
Election	Apruebo Dignidad AD / FA			Green Ecologists PEV			New Social Pact NPS / NM			Democratic Convergence CD			Chile Vamos Podemos / Vamos			Party of the People PDG			Christian Social Front FSC		
Election	Votes	%	Seats	Votes	%	Seats	Votes	%	Seats	Votes	%	Seats	Votes	%	Seats	Votes	%	Seats	Votes	%	Seats
2021	31,236	15.73%	1	9,552	4.81%	0	72,493	36.50%	2				48,843	24.59%	2	15,997	8.06%	0	13,722	6.91%	0
2017	15,662	8.68%	0				46,480	25.77%	1	26,138	14.49%	1	77,012	42.69%	3						

=== Detailed ===
==== 2021 ====
Results of the 2021 general election held on 21 November 2021:

Party		Pact	Party			Pact		
Party		Pact	Votes	%	Seats	Votes	%	Seats
Party for Democracy	PPD	New Social Pact	57,311	28.86%	2	72,493	36.50%	2
Socialist Party of Chile	PS	New Social Pact	10,332	5.20%	0	72,493	36.50%	2
Radical Party of Chile	PR	New Social Pact	2,708	1.36%	0	72,493	36.50%	2
Christian Democratic Party	PDC	New Social Pact	2,142	1.08%	0	72,493	36.50%	2
Independent Democratic Union	UDI	Chile Podemos +	25,795	12.99%	1	48,843	24.59%	2
National Renewal	RN	Chile Podemos +	23,048	11.61%	1	48,843	24.59%	2
Social Convergence	CS	Apruebo Dignidad	14,159	7.13%	1	31,236	15.73%	1
Social Green Regionalist Federation	FREVS	Apruebo Dignidad	11,191	5.64%	0	31,236	15.73%	1
Communist Party of Chile	PC	Apruebo Dignidad	5,223	2.63%	0	31,236	15.73%	1
Comunes	COM	Apruebo Dignidad	663	0.33%	0	31,236	15.73%	1
Party of the People	PDG		15,997	8.06%	0	15,997	8.06%	0
Republican Party	REP	Christian Social Front	13,722	6.91%	0	13,722	6.91%	0
Green Ecologist Party	PEV		9,552	4.81%	0	9,552	4.81%	0
United Centre	CU	United Independents	3,148	1.59%	0	3,148	1.59%	0
Progressive Party	PRO		1,859	0.94%	0	1,859	0.94%	0
Patriotic Union	UPA		1,745	0.88%	0	1,745	0.88%	0
Valid votes			198,595	100.00%	5	198,595	100.00%	5
Blank votes			9,695	4.47%		9,695	4.47%	
Rejected votes – other			8,713	4.02%		8,713	4.02%	
Total polled			217,003	48.72%		217,003	48.72%	
Registered electors			445,363			445,363		

The following candidates were elected: Marta González (PPD), 1,965 votes; Marcela Riquelme (CS), 11,548 votes; Natalia Romero (UDI), 10,344 votes; Diego Schalper (RN), 17,124 votes; and Raúl Soto (PPD), 55,346 votes.

==== 2017 ====
Results of the 2017 general election held on 19 November 2017:

Party		Pact	Party			Pact		
Party		Pact	Votes	%	Seats	Votes	%	Seats
Independent Democratic Union	UDI	Chile Vamos	44,444	24.64%	2	77,012	42.69%	3
National Renewal	RN	Chile Vamos	32,568	18.05%	1	77,012	42.69%	3
Socialist Party of Chile	PS	Nueva Mayoría	24,924	13.82%	1	46,480	25.77%	1
Party for Democracy	PPD	Nueva Mayoría	19,408	10.76%	0	46,480	25.77%	1
Communist Party of Chile	PC	Nueva Mayoría	2,148	1.19%	0	46,480	25.77%	1
Christian Democratic Party	PDC	Democratic Convergence	15,149	8.40%	1	26,138	14.49%	1
Citizen Left	IC	Democratic Convergence	10,989	6.09%	0	26,138	14.49%	1
Democratic Revolution	RD	Broad Front	9,399	5.21%	0	15,662	8.68%	0
Humanist Party	PH	Broad Front	6,263	3.47%	0	15,662	8.68%	0
Progressive Party	PRO	All Over Chile	6,607	3.66%	0	6,607	3.66%	0
Social Green Regionalist Federation	FREVS	Green Regionalist Coalition	5,347	2.96%	0	5,347	2.96%	0
Patriotic Union	UPA		3,149	1.75%	0	3,149	1.75%	0
Valid votes			180,395	100.00%	5	180,395	100.00%	5
Blank votes			11,932	5.85%		11,932	5.85%	
Rejected votes – other			11,517	5.65%		11,517	5.65%	
Total polled			203,844	48.16%		203,844	48.16%	
Registered electors			423,283			423,283		

The following candidates were elected: Juan Luis Castro (PS), 17,849 votes; Issa Kort (UDI), 16,773 votes; Javier Macaya (UDI), 25,219 votes; Diego Schalper (RN), 19,285 votes; and Raúl Soto (PDC), 9,026 votes.
