= Independent Regionalist Agrarian and Social Movement =

Independent Regionalist Agrarian Green Movement Movimiento Independiente Regionalista Agrario Verde
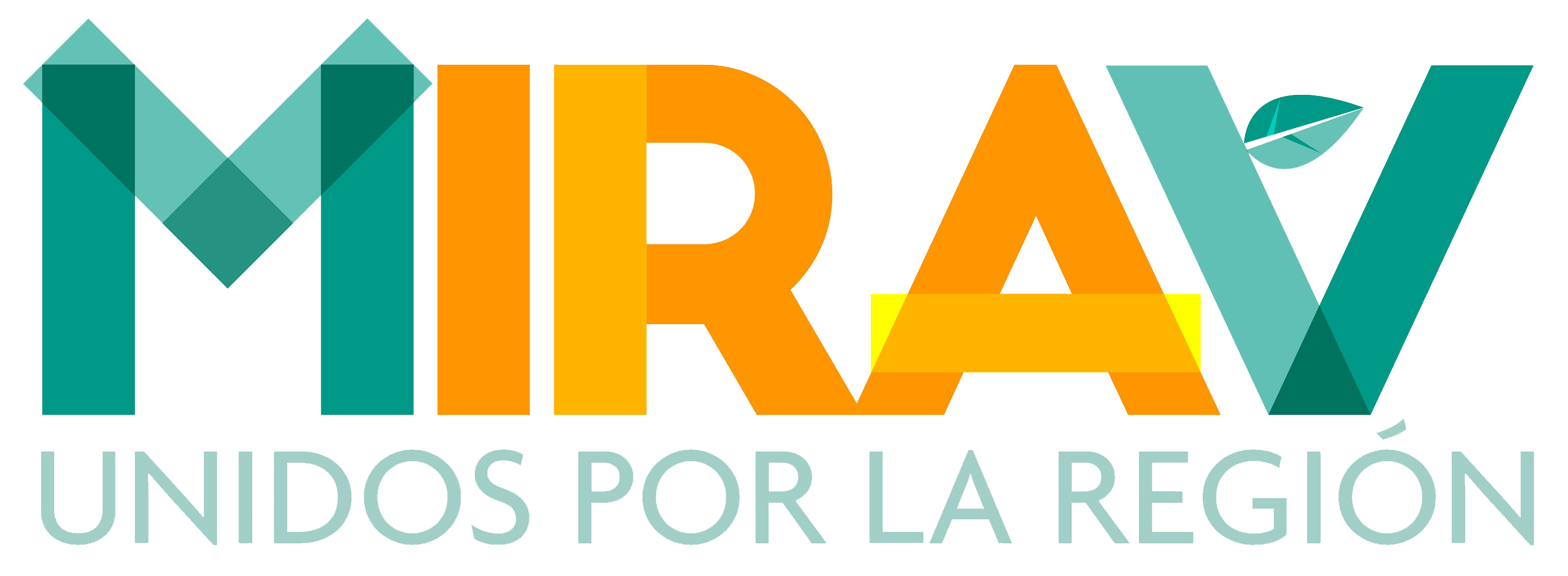
- Leader: Alejandra Sepúlveda
- General Secretary: Marta Molina
- Founded: July 14, 2015
- Dissolved: February 15, 2016
- Merged into: Social Green Regionalist Federation
- Headquarters: Olegario Lazo 871, San Fernando
- Ideology: Environmentalism; Agrarianism; Regionalism
- Political position: Center-left
- Slogan: United for the region!

Website
- https://www.miras.cl/

The Independent Regionalist Agrarian and Social Movement (Spanish: Movimiento Independiente Regionalista Agrario y Social, MIRAS) called in some sources as Independent Regionalist Agrarian Green Movement (Spanish: Movimiento Independiente Regionalista Agrario Verde, MIRAV) was a Chilean regionalist political party. It was founded in 2015 and was legally recognized by the Electoral Service until April 2017 when it was merged with FREVS and dissolved.

== History ==
The party was created by an independent deputy Alejandra Sepúlveda with the support of other former deputies like Esteban Valenzuela and Aníbal Pérez. The idea behind the creation of MIRAV arose after a meeting held on June 12, 2015, in the O'Higgins Region, where several politicians who were unhappy with the way traditional political parties of Chile were running their country met. There, it was decided to officially register MIRAV as the first step towards the founding of several parties in region that would join a "federation of regionalist parties" which will focus on a new electoral system in the upcoming and next parliamentary elections, in which there will no longer be a binomial voting system.

The party's founding process began in July, when its first minutes were published in the Official Journal of the Republic of Chile. The party announced that it would present candidates for mayors and councilors in the 2016 municipal elections, as part of the Democratic Alternative alliance.

On February 2, 2016, the party was officially registered in the Registry of Political Parties, being recognized by the Electoral Service. In January 2017, the party agreed to merge with the Regional and Popular Front, the Green North Regional Force and We Are Aysén to form the Social Green Regionalist Federation (FREVS). The party was officially dissolved on April 25, 2017, when FREVS was created.

== Electoral history ==
=== Municipal elections ===
Election	Mayors			Councilors		
Election	Votes	% of votes	Seats	Votes	% of votes	Seats
2016	9076	0%	0 / 345	18 549	0%	10 / 2,240

== See also ==
- List of political parties in Chile
