= Aníbal Pérez =

Aníbal Pérez may refer to:

- Aníbal Pérez (footballer) (born 1944), Paraguayan footballer
- Aníbal Pérez-Liñán (born 1969), Argentine political scientist
- Aníbal Pérez (politician) (born 1948), Chilean politician
