= Javiera Martínez =

Chilean civil engineer and political scientist (born 1986)

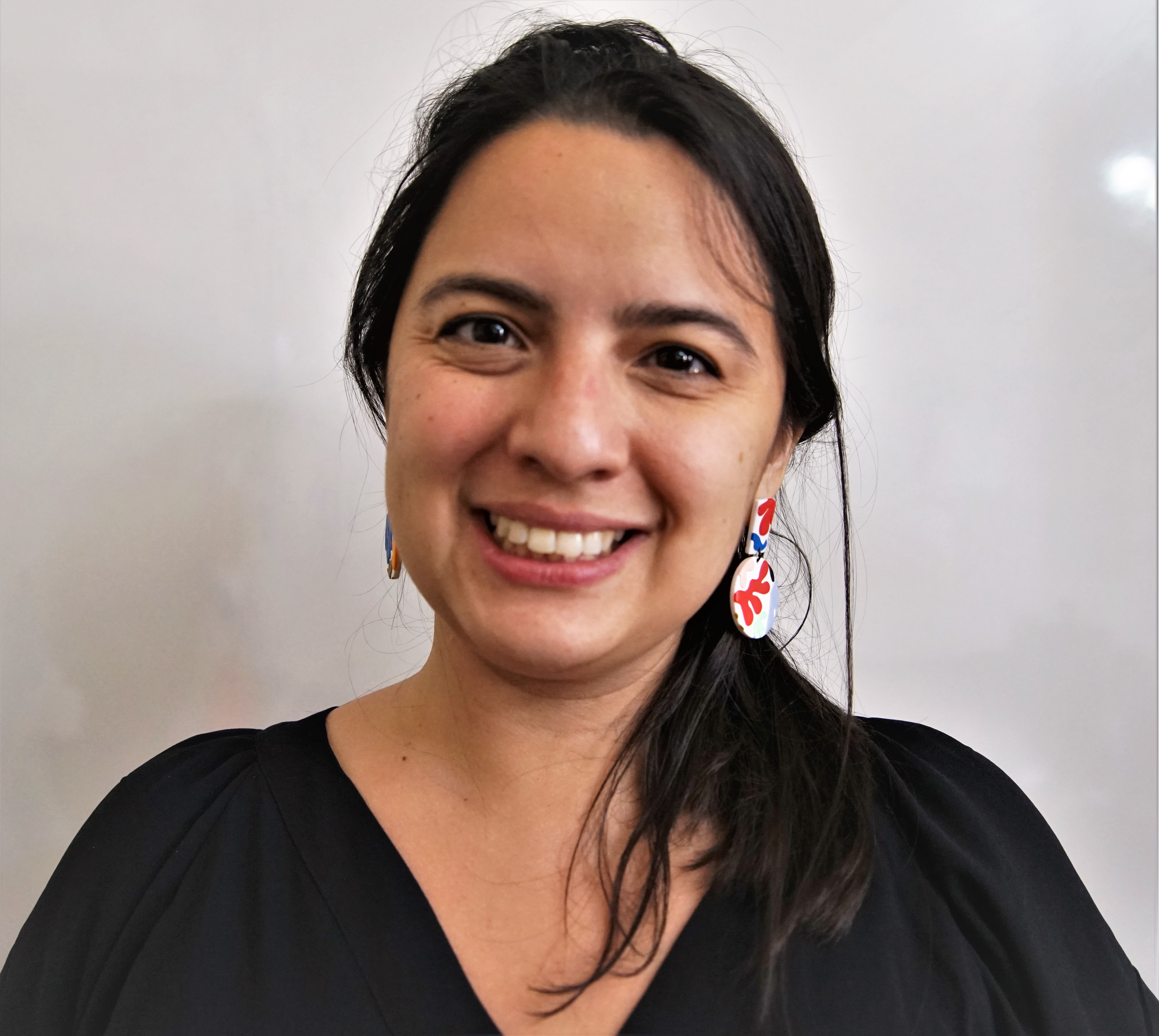

Head of Budget
- Incumbent
- Assumed office 11 March 2022
- President: Gabriel Boric
- Preceded by: Cristina Torres Delgado

Personal details
- Born: 10 September 1986 (age 40) Valdivia, Chile
- Party: Democratic Revolution
- Education: Pontifical Catholic University of Chile; New York University (MA)
- Occupation: Politician
- Profession: Civil Engineer

Javiera Patricia Martínez Fariña (born 10 November 1986) is a Chilean civil engineer and political scientist, member of the Democratic Revolution (RD). Since March 11, 2022, she has been the head of the Budget Directorate (Dipres), acting under the government of Gabriel Boric.

== Education ==
Javiera Martínez completed her higher studies in industrial civil engineering in mining at the Pontifical Catholic University of Chile (PUC), and then pursued a master's degree in political science with a specialization in political economy at New York University, United States, graduating in 2018.

== Professional and political career ==
At the PUC she was a founding activist, along with other students such as Miguel Crispi, of the Nueva Acción Universitaria (NAU), a center-left political movement. She became the first executive secretary of the Federation of Students of the Catholic University (FEUC), sharing the list with Giovanna Roa and Joaquín Walker in 2010.

During the second government of Michelle Bachelet, between 2014 and 2016 she was part of the cabinet team of the Ministry of Education (Mineduc), working with the ministers of the branch: Nicolás Eyzaguirre and Adriana Delpiano. On that occasion, she participated in the design of several legislative initiatives, including the 2015 and 2016 Budget Law, and the one that allowed the creation of the Ministry of Science, Technology, Knowledge and Innovation, among others.

From October 2020 to March 2022, she was president of the board of directors of the think tank, Rumbo Colectivo, which is "focused on reflection, research and the development of projects with an avant-garde outlook for the deepening of democracy in the political, economic and cultural affairs of the country". In this instance, she elaborated proposals for the constitutional debate on fiscal matters and initiatives for the revision of the structural balance and public spending on the climate crisis.

In 2013, she served as campaign manager for the congressional campaign of her colleague from the Democratic Revolution (RD) party, Giorgio Jackson.

Between 2018 and 2021, she served as technical advisor to parliamentarians of the left-wing coalition Frente Amplio (FA), on fiscal issues during the 2018–2022 legislative period.

Between August and December 2021, she was a member of the programmatic team of the Apruebo Dignidad candidate Gabriel Boric during his presidential campaign. After Boric won the election, she was appointed as the head of the Budget Directorate (Dipres) in March 2022, being the third woman in history to hold this position.
