= Rocío Faúndez =

Chilean politician (born 1975)

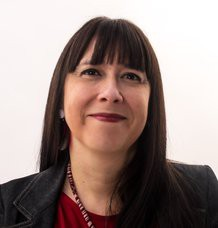

Undersecretary of Childhood
- In office 11 March 2022 – 8 September 2022
- President: Gabriel Boric
- Preceded by: Blanquita Honorato
- Succeeded by: Yolanda Pizarro

Personal details
- Born: 18 December 1975 (age 50) Santiago, Chile
- Party: Democratic Revolution
- Education: Pontifical Catholic University of Chile; Alberto Hurtado University (MA); Pompeu Fabra University (PhD)
- Occupation: Politician
- Profession: Social worker

Rocío del Pilar Faúndez García (Santiago, December 18, 1975) is a Chilean social worker, university professor and politician, member of Democratic Revolution (RD). She was Undersecretary of Children (Chile), between March and September 2022, in the government of Gabriel Boric.

== Education and Professional career ==
She completed her higher education in social work and then pursued a degree in political science at the Pontifical Catholic University of Chile (PUC). She also completed a master's degree in Latin American social and political studies at Alberto Hurtado University, and a master's degree in political and social sciences at the Pompeu Fabra University, Spain.

She has practiced her profession in areas related to children and adolescents, as well as in gender and diversity issues, and inclusion in higher education. Additionally, she has worked with independent consultancies, as well as in the Studies Area of the National Council for Children, where she led the Studies Area of the "Program for Inclusive Access". She also worked in the Equity and Permanence Area of the University of Santiago, Chile (Usach). Additionally, she served as an academic at the Alberto Hurtado University for ten years.

== Political career ==
Rocío Faúndez García is a feminist and a member of the Democratic Revolution (RD) party. In the 2021 parliamentary elections, she ran for a seat as deputy representing District No. 8 – composed of the municipalities of Cerrillos, Colina, Estación Central, Lampa, Maipú, Pudahuel, Quilicura, Til Tili – in the Metropolitan Region of Santiago, without being elected.

In February 2022, she was appointed by President Gabriel Boric, as head of the Undersecretariat for Children in the Ministry of Social Development, a position she assumed on March 11 of that year, with the formal start of the administration. On September 8, 2022, Boric made changes in the head of six undersecretaries of State, among which was the Undersecretary for Children, being replaced by the Party for Democracy (PPD) member, Yolanda Pizarro.
