= Regional and Popular Front =

Regional and Popular Front Frente Regional y Popular
- Leader: Jaime Mulet
- General Secretary: Omar Monardes
- Founded: November 24, 2015
- Legalised: June 20, 2016
- Dissolved: April 25, 2017
- Merged into: Social Green Regionalist Federation
- Headquarters: Plaza O'Higgins 40, Vallenar
- Ideology: Regionalism; Progressivism; Green politics
- Political position: Centre-left
- Colors: Blue, Yellow

Party flag
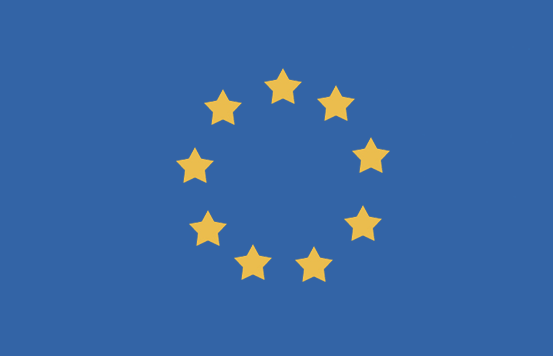

The Regional and Popular Front (Spanish: Frente Regional y Popular, FRP) was a Chilean centre-left political party with a regionalist ideology. It was active only in the regions of Antofagasta and Atacama. On June 20, 2016, the legal constitution of the party was recognized in the aforementioned regions and in April 2017 it merged with other several regionalist parties into the Social Green Regionalist Federation (FREVS).

== History ==
FRP was founded on November 24, 2015 (as stated in the news report published on January 21, 2016, in the Official Journal of the Republic of Chile). The creation of the party had the support of prominent political figures in the region, such as former deputy Jaime Mulet and former mayor of the Tierra Amarilla city Yhanss Delgado.

In its declaration of principles, the FRP claims to be a regionalist and progressive party, whose main focus is the human beings and their rights.

The party announced that it would present candidates for councilors in the Atacama Region for the municipal elections of 2016, where it participated in a political coalition with the Progressive and Patagonian Regional Democracy parties which was announced on April 10, 2016.

On February 3, 2017, the party requested legal registration in the Antofagasta Region, which was accepted on April 3 of the same year. In the same month of February, the party agreed to merge with Green North Regional Force, Independent Regionalist Agrarian and Social Movement and Somos Aysén to form the Social Green Regionalist Federation (FREVS). It was officially dissolved on April 26, 2017, when FREVS was legally constituted.

== Election results ==
=== Municipal elections ===
Election	Mayors			Councilors		
Election	Votes	% of votes	Seats	Votes	% of votes	Seats
2016	689	0%	0 / 345	6949	0%	6 / 2,240
