= Álvaro Díaz =

Álvaro Díaz may refer to:

- Álvaro Díaz González (born 1972), Chilean journalist, producer and director
- Álvaro Díaz Pérez (1950–2021), Chilean economist and politician
- Álvaro Díaz (motorcyclist) (born 2003), Spanish motorcycle racer
- Álvaro Díaz (rapper) (born 1989), Puerto Rican rapper

== See also ==
- Álvaro Dias (disambiguation)
