= Javier Macaya =

Chilean politician and lawyer

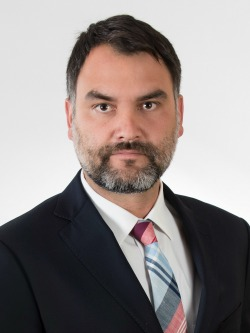

Member of the Senate
- Incumbent
- Assumed office 11 March 2022
- Constituency: O'Higgins Region

Member of the Chamber of Deputies
- In office 11 March 2018 – 11 March 2022
- Preceded by: Creation of the charge
- Constituency: District 15
- In office 11 March 2010 – 11 March 2018
- Preceded by: Juan Masferrer
- Succeeded by: Dissolution of the charge
- Constituency: 34th District

Personal details
- Born: 11 November 1978 (age 47) San Fernando, Chile
- Party: Unión Demócrata Independiente
- Spouse: Constanza Farías
- Children: Four
- Education: Pontifical Catholic University of Chile (LL.B); University of Valparaíso (LL.M); Adolfo Ibáñez University (PgD)
- Occupation: Politician
- Profession: Lawyer

Javier Ignacio Macaya Danus (born 11 November 1979) is a Chilean lawyer and politician. A member of the Independent Democratic Union (UDI), he has served as Senator for the 8th senatorial constituency of the O'Higgins Region since 2022.

He previously served as a Deputy for the 15th electoral district of the same region between 2018 and 2022, and represented the former 34th electoral district for two consecutive terms between 2010 and 2018.

Macaya served as president of the Independent Democratic Union between 12 December 2020 and 23 July 2024.

== Biography ==
=== Early life and family ===
Macaya was born in Santiago, Chile, on 11 November 1979. He is the son of Eduardo Juan Macaya Zentilli and María Teresa Danús Larroulet.

He is the father of four children.

=== Education and professional career ===
Between 1982 and 1996, he completed his primary and secondary education at Instituto San Fernando (Marist Brothers). He studied law at the Pontifical Catholic University of Chile. In 2004, he submitted the thesis Las denominaciones de origen en la legislación nacional, en especial en la industria vitivinícola, and on 27 September 2004 was admitted to the bar by the Supreme Court of Chile.

In 2003, he completed a diploma in Chilean wine production, elaboration, and tasting at the Pontifical Catholic University of Chile. Between 2004 and 2006, he undertook postgraduate studies in criminal procedural reform at the University of Valparaíso.

Later, between 2007 and 2008, he completed a master’s degree in tax management and administration at Adolfo Ibáñez University.

He carried out his professional legal training in 2002 at the Legal Assistance Corporation of San Fernando. He later joined the Jóvenes al Servicio de Chile program of the Jaime Guzmán Foundation, where he organized and participated in training seminars and workshops for young people in San Fernando, Viña del Mar, and Villa Alemana. Subsequently, he served as head of the Legal Department of the Municipal Corporation of Viña del Mar for Social Development.

Between 2005 and 2006, Macaya worked as a lecturer at DUOC UC in Viña del Mar and at Universidad de las Américas.

In 2008, he co-founded the law firm Domínguez, Ossa, Long y Macaya, from which he withdrew upon assuming his duties as a Deputy.

== Political career ==
Macaya is a long-standing member of the Independent Democratic Union. In 2008, he participated in the party’s campaign team for the municipal elections in Viña del Mar, serving as electoral administrator.

Between 2012 and 2014, he held the position of treasurer of the UDI, and in 2014 he served as the party’s secretary-general. Between 11 March and 9 April 2015, he acted as interim president of the party following the resignation of Ernesto Silva Méndez.

On 16 December 2018, Macaya ran for the presidency of the UDI but was not elected. On 12 December 2020, he was elected president of the party, obtaining 54.8% of the vote and defeating former senator Víctor Pérez.

In August 2021, he registered his candidacy for the Senate, representing the UDI within the Chile Podemos Más coalition for the 8th senatorial constituency of the O'Higgins Region. In the November elections, he was elected senator with 51,142 votes, corresponding to 15.11% of the valid votes cast.

In December 2022, he was re-elected as president of the UDI. He resigned from the position on 23 July 2024.
