= Orueta =

Orueta is a surname. Notable people with the surname include:

- Alfonso Orueta (1929–2012), Chilean politician and football manager
- Arrate Orueta (born 1984), Spanish footballer
- Valentín Olano Orueta (1808–1851), Spanish politician

== See also ==
- Oreta, a genus of moths
