= Issa Kort =

Chilean politician (born 1980)

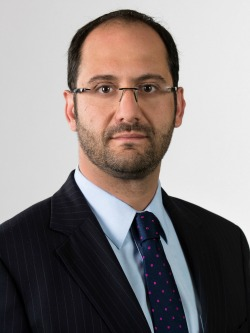
- Official portrait, 2018

Ambassador of Chile to Brazil
- Incumbent
- Assumed office 4 May 2026
- President: José Antonio Kast
- Preceded by: Sebastián Depolo

Ambassador of Chile to the Organization of American States
- In office 15 June 2021 – 10 March 2022
- Appointed by: Sebastián Piñera
- Preceded by: Hernán Salinas
- Succeeded by: Sebastián Kraljevic

Member of the Chamber of Deputies
- In office 11 March 2018 – 15 June 2021
- Preceded by: District created
- Succeeded by: Juan Manuel Masferrer
- Constituency: District 15
- In office 10 August 2011 – 11 March 2018
- Preceded by: Alejandro García-Huidobro
- Succeeded by: Re-districted
- Constituency: District 32

Personal details
- Born: 9 May 1980 (age 46) Peumo, Chile
- Party: Independent Democratic Union (UDI)
- Education: Finis Terrae University
- Occupation: Politician
- Profession: Historian

Issa Farid Kort Garriga (born 9 May 1980) is a Chilean politician who serves as ambassador of Chile to Brazil since May 2026, during the presidency of José Antonio Kast.

From 2011 to 2021, he served as a deputy representing the O'Higgins Region, first in now-defunct district 32 and later in district 15. From 2021 to 2022, he served as Chile's ambassador to the Organization of American States.

== Early life and education ==
Issa Farid Kort Garriga was born on 9 May 1980, in Santiago, Chile. He is the son of Jorge Kort Kort and Celia Fany Garriga Orellana. Issa Kort is of Palestinian descent.

Between 1985 and 1987, he completed his primary education at Colegio El Salvador (Barnabite Fathers) in San Vicente de Tagua Tagua. He later attended the Instituto de los Hermanos Maristas of San Fernando, from which he graduated in 1997.

In 1998, Kort completed a diploma in Arabic Language and Literature at the Center for Arab Studies of the Faculty of Philosophy and Humanities of the University of Chile. Between 1999 and 2004, he studied at the School of History of Finis Terrae University, earning a degree in History. His undergraduate thesis was titled Huellas en el barro: Impacto social y económico de la Reforma Agraria en tres casos ilustrativos de la provincia de Colchagua. Estudio microhistórico.

In 2005, he completed an academic internship at the Department of History of the University of California, Davis. In 2007, he completed a course on Ceremonial and Protocol for Public and Private Institutions taught by the Andrés Bello Diplomatic Academy of Chile. In 2010, he enrolled in the Master of Business Administration (MBA) program at Andrés Bello University.

== Professional career ==
In 2001, Kort worked as a research assistant at the Centro de Investigación y Documentación en Historia de Chile Contemporáneo (CIDOC). Between 2001 and 2004, he served as a teaching assistant and assistant lecturer in various courses on Chilean and World History at the University of Development and Finis Terrae University.

From 2005 to 2010, he taught courses in Chilean and World History at Finis Terrae University, the University of Development, and Andrés Bello University. During the same period, between 2005 and April 2010, he served as Administration and Finance Manager of a family office with investments in agriculture, agribusiness, transportation, earthmoving, construction, consulting, and real estate.

Since 2014, he has served as president of the Mining and Mines Commission of the Latin American and Caribbean Parliament. He also headed the Political Dialogue Committee between the National Congress of Chile and the National People's Congress of China.

== Other activities ==
Kort is co-author of the book Historiadores Chilenos Frente al Bicentenario, published by the Fondo Bicentenario. He has published opinion columns in newspapers and magazines such as El Mercurio, El Rancagüino, Qué Pasa, and Al-Damir magazine.

He has conducted historical research on rural areas of the O'Higgins Region, including El Huique and the Nilahue and Chimbarongo valleys. He has also delivered academic lectures and conference presentations at Andrés Bello University and Finis Terrae University, working at the latter within CIDOC.

== Political career ==
Kort is a member of the Independent Democratic Union (UDI), where he served as Secretary General of the party.

Between April 2010 and August 2011, he served as Regional Director and President of the Regional Council of Culture and the Arts in the O'Higgins Region (Seremi of Culture).

In the parliamentary elections of November 2013, he ran as a candidate for the Chamber of Deputies representing the 32nd electoral district of the O'Higgins Region for the 2014–2018 term, representing the Independent Democratic Union. He was elected after obtaining 18,812 votes, equivalent to 20.65% of the total valid votes in the district.

In August 2017, he registered his candidacy for deputy for the newly created 15th electoral district of the O'Higgins Region, again representing the Independent Democratic Union. He was elected with 16,773 votes, equivalent to 9.30% of the total valid votes.

On 15 June 2021, he resigned as deputy to take office as Chile's ambassador to the Organization of American States, having been appointed by President Sebastián Piñera. He left office on 10 March 2022.

On 4 May 2026, he was appointed as ambassador of Chile to Brazil by President José Antonio Kast.

== Views and political beliefs ==
Kort has expressed his opposition to same-sex adoption. He elaborated on his position, saying: "I believe that a boy or girl is the result of a sexual relationship between a man and a woman, because the only way to produce a third person is between a man and a woman with penetrating and receptive reproductive organs, respectively". He opposes same-sex marriage, stating that "marriage is between a man and a woman", but he supports civil unions for such couples.

He has also expressed opposition to abortion, even in cases of rape and birth defects, stating: "[...] women who have been raped and people born with birth defects. Why would we cut life short? Let's give them a chance, since we've all been given one, since no one is perfect". Kort reaffirmed this position when consulted regarding the case of an 11-year-old girl who became pregnant after being raped by her stepfather, declaring: "What I understand, medically, about the moment when a woman experiences her first period, her first menstruation, is that her body is already prepared to be a mother, to conceive".
