= We Are Aysén =

We are Aysén Somos Aysén
- Leader: Jonathan Hechenleitner
- General Secretary: Miriam Chible
- Founded: October 23, 2015
- Legalised: June 22, 2016
- Dissolved: April 25, 2017
- Merged into: Social Green Regionalist Federation
- Headquarters: Simpson 1208, Coyhaique
- Ideology: Regionalism; Green politics Decentralization; Aysen Region interests
- Political position: Centre-left
- Colors: Green, Blue and Red
- Slogan: The green spirit of Patagonia!

We are Aysén (Spanish: Somos Aysén, SA) was a Chilean regionalist political party, founded on October 23, 2015. Its main objective is to represent the interests of the inhabitants of the Aysén Region. It was officially recognized by the Electoral Service of Chile between 2016 and 2017, when SA was merged into the Social Green Regionalist Federation.

== History ==
The party was the political heir of the "Defendamos Aysén" movement, which gained notoriety in 2014 by organizing several protests in the Aysén region.

Somos Aysén was founded on October 23, 2015. Its main goal was to represent the interests of the inhabitants of the Aysén Region, promoting decentralization and regionalization. In its declaration of principles, it claimed to advocate for local empowerment, public participation and environmental sustainability.

The party was initially to present candidates for the 2016 municipal elections as part of the Democratic Alternative alliance, however it withdrew in July and presented its own list of candidates.

The party was legally recognized by the Electoral Service of Chile and registered in the Aysén Region on June 22, 2016, after the signatures required for its registration were verified and approved. In November of that same year, Senator Antonio Horvath announced his resignation from the party to compete in the 2017 parliamentary elections as an independent supported by the Amplitude party.

In January 2017, the party agreed to merge with the Regional and Popular Front, the Green North Regional Force and the Independent Regionalist Agrarian and Social Movement to form the Social Green Regionalist Federation (FREVS). The party was officially dissolved on April 25, 2017, when the creation of the FREVS was legalized.

== Electoral history ==
=== Municipal elections ===
Election	Mayors			Councillors		
Election	Votes	% of votes	Seats	Votes	% of votes	Seats
2016	108	0%	0 / 345	1120	0%	0 / 2,240
