= Juan Manuel Masferrer =

Chilean politician (born 1980)

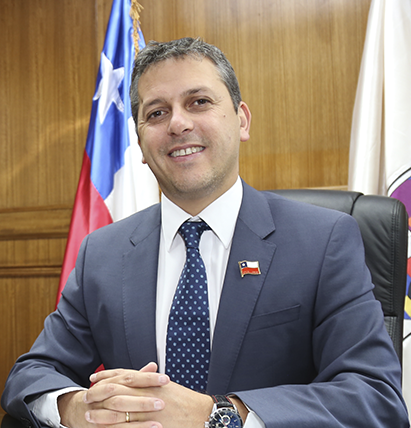

Member of the Chamber of Deputies
- In office 15 June 2021 – 11 March 2022
- Preceded by: Issa Kort
- Constituency: 9th District

Personal details
- Born: 1 May 1980 (age 45) Rancagua, Chile
- Party: Independent Democratic Union (UDI)
- Parent: Juan Masferrer
- Education: Instituto O'Higgins de Rancagua
- Alma mater: Andrés Bello National University (LL.B)
- Occupation: Politician
- Profession: Lawyer

Juan Manuel Masferrer Vidal (born 1 May 1980) is a Chilean lawyer and politician who served as a deputy.

He served as Undersecretary of Regional and Administrative Development in the second government of Sebastián Piñera.

He previously served as Mayor of the Libertador Bernardo O'Higgins Region between March 2018 and April 2020.

== Biography ==
He completed his primary education in the commune of Las Cabras and secondary education at the O'Higgins Institute in Rancagua.

He later entered to study law at the Andrés Bello National University, graduating as a lawyer.

In the 2013 CORE elections, he was a candidate for Regional Councilor for the Cachapoal I constituency (Commune of Rancagua), achieving the second majority in the constituency, with 10.3% of the votes, after Felipe García-Huidobro, not being elected.

Until March 2018, he served as Director of Student Affairs at the Universidad del Desarrollo. Previously, he was director of the School of Leadership at San Sebastián University. He was general secretary of the UDI youth at the national level, a party of which he is a member.

On March 11, 2018, he was appointed by President Sebastián Piñera as Mayor of the Libertador Bernardo O'Higgins Region, a position he held until April 20, 2020.

On June 6, 2020, he was appointed as Undersecretary of Regional and Administrative Development (SUBDERE), a position from which he resigned on November 20, 2020.

That same year, in 2020, he was invited by the Chilean Ministry of Health to join the COVID-19 Social Table, created to address the pandemic in the country.

In 2021 he was appointed deputy for his party, replacing Issa Kort who was appointed as ambassador.
