= Ansoleaga =

Ansoleaga is a Spanish surname. Notable people with the surname include:

- Alfonso Orueta Ansoleaga (1929–2012), Chilean politician and football manager
- Florencio Ansoleaga (1846–1916), Spanish architect, historian, restorer, and archaeologist
- Manuel Ansoleaga (1879–?), Spanish footballer
