= Domingo Namuncura =

Chilean politician

Ambassador of Chile in the Guatemala
- In office 11 March 2014 – 11 March 2018
- President: Michelle Bachelet
- Preceded by: Juan Masferrer
- Succeeded by: Javier Becker

National Director of the CONADI
- In office 11 March 2014 – 11 March 2018
- President: Eduardo Frei Ruíz-Tagle
- Preceded by: Mauricio Huenchulaf Cayuqueo
- Succeeded by: Rodrigo González López

Personal details
- Born: 1 January 1952 (age 74) Valparaíso, Chile
- Party: Party for Democracy
- Education: Pontifical Catholic University of Valparaíso (BA); Academy of Christian Humanism University (MA)
- Profession: Social worker

Domingo Namuncura Serrano (born 1952) is a Chilean social worker and politician of Mapuche descent who served as Ambassador of his country in Guatemala.
