= Marcela Riquelme =

Chilean politician (born 1973)

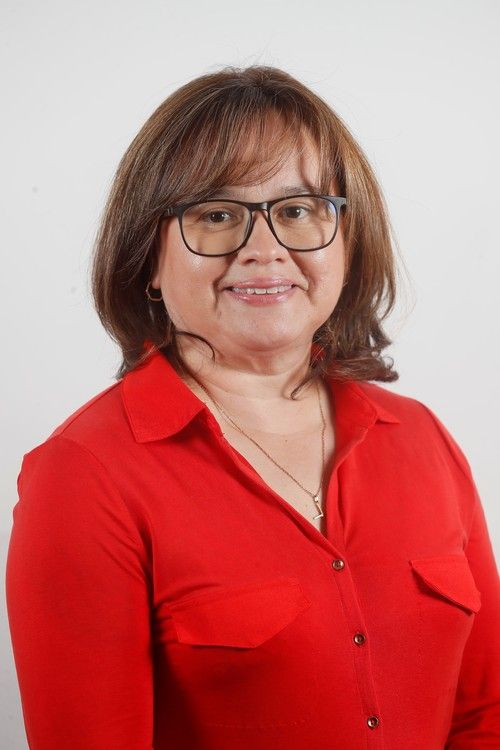
- Riquelme as deputy in 2022.

Member of the Chamber of Deputies
- In office 11 March 2022 – 11 March 2026
- Constituency: District 15

Personal details
- Born: 4 March 1973 (age 53) Rancagua, Chile
- Party: Independent
- Domestic partner: Marcela Miranda
- Children: 2
- Education: University of Chile

Marcela Patricia Riquelme Aliaga (born 4 March 1973) is a Chilean lawyer, LGBT rights activist and politician. Elected to the Chamber of Deputies for district 15 in 2021, she was the first openly lesbian person to serve in the National Congress of Chile.

== Early life and career ==
Riquelme was born on 4 March 1973, in Rancagua. She studied law at the University of Chile, graduating in 1998. During her career as a lawyer, she had always stood out for the permanent defense of labor rights, human rights, civil rights and social causes. She served as a citizen defender of the Municipality of Rancagua, where she obtained important rulings in favor of workers from different companies. She was also a lawyer for the Municipality of Coltauco and for the Labor Ombudsman of the O'Higgins Region, between 2011 and 2014. A specialist in labor law and public policy, she represented the College of Midwives of Chile before the Constitutional Court in defense of the decriminalization of abortion in 2017.

== Political career ==
In March 2014, Riquelme (then a DC member) was presented by the Intendant of the O'Higgins Region Morín Contreras as the new Seremi of Justice. However, she announced her resignation on the same day, alluding that she was facing a summary in the Regional Comptroller's Office initiated during the first government of Sebastián Piñera, which she described as "unjustified", pointing out on social networks: "Sooner rather than later this injustice will be demonstrated, I know, but I regret not having been able to represent those of us who dreamed this dream." About the reason for the summary, Riquelme later explained: "in my last job [Labor Ombudsman of Rancagua] I suffered harassment, homophobic ridicule; I was forbidden to have photos of my children on the desk. That's why last October I had a job stress leave; The same day I left on leave they opened that summary."

In the 2021 Chilean Constitutional Convention election, Riquelme presented herself as an independent candidate for the Constitutional Convention, for District 15. Although she obtained the second majority in the district, with more than 15,000 votes, she did not manage to be elected, since she presented herself as a candidate without belonging to any list of independents.

For the parliamentary elections of the same year, Riquelme presented herself as an independent candidate in the Social Convergence quota, forming part of Apruebo Dignidad, obtaining 11,493 votes (5.79%), being elected as deputy for the same district for the period 2022–2026. She became, in turn, one of the first openly lesbian/bisexual women to reach the National Congress, along with Camila Musante and Francisca Bello.

== Election history ==
Year	Type	District	Coalition	Party	Votes	%	Result
2021	Constitutional Convention	15th district	Independent	Ind.	15,360	8.49	Not elected
2021	Parliamentary	15th district	Apruebo Dignidad	Ind.–CS	11,494	5.79	Elected Deputy
2025	Parliamentary	15th district	Unidad por Chile	Ind.–PR	3,662	1.07	Not re-elected

== Controversies ==
In November 2024, Marcela Riquelme was reported for sexual abuse before her party’s Supreme Tribunal, which decided to suspend her membership. Later, Riquelme resigned from the Broad Front, citing a lack of support from its regional leadership, and she filed a self-report with the Public Prosecutor’s Office, in her words, "so that the complaint is where it needs to be".

== Personal life ==
Riquelme became known in 2014 because her son, Alexis Castillo, obtained a national score in Mathematics at the PSU the previous year, the composition of her homoparental family being notable. Her partner is Marcela Miranda, a Physical Education teacher, biological mother of Alexis and her other daughter, Sofía. In July 2015, this couple was also the first homosexual couple in the O'Higgins Region in request time to sign the Civil Union Agreement, recently enacted by law. They finalized their civil union on 21 November of that year.
