= Sebastián Depolo =

Chilean politician

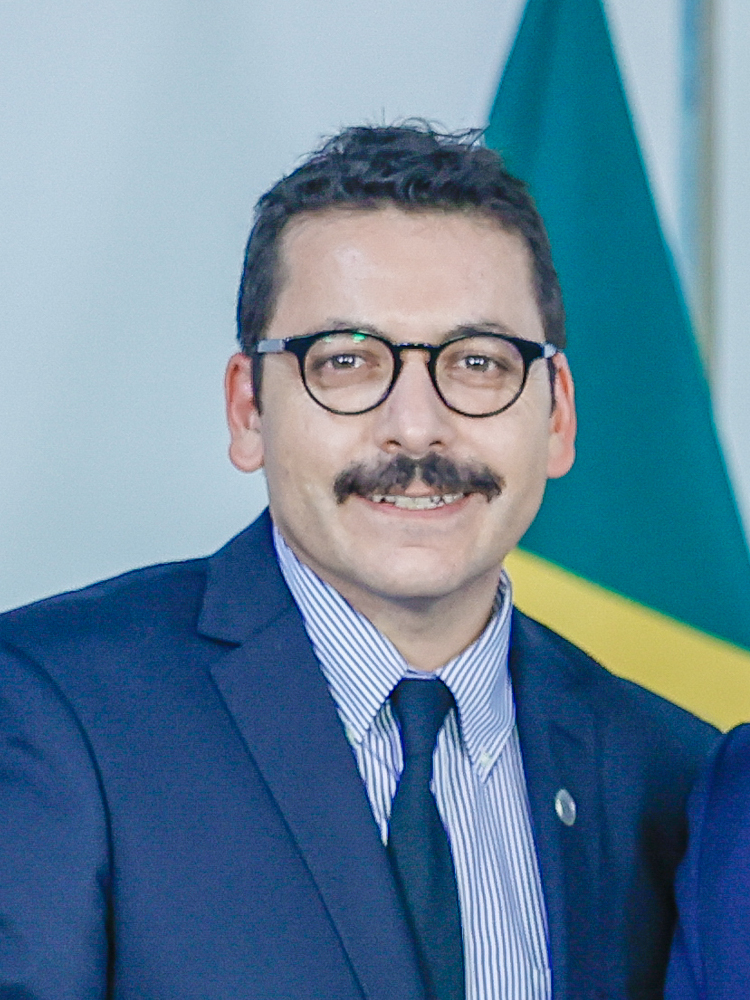
- Depolo in May 2023

Ambassador of Chile to Brazil
- In office 22 March 2022 – 11 March 2026
- President: Gabriel Boric
- Preceded by: Fernando Schmidt
- Succeeded by: Issa Kort

President of Democratic Revolution
- In office 2015–2016
- Preceded by: Pablo Paredes Muñoz
- Succeeded by: Rodrigo Echecopar

Personal details
- Born: 10 November 1976 (age 49) Coya, Chile
- Party: Democratic Revolution
- Education: University of Concepción (Bachelor of Arts, 1999) (MA, 2002)
- Occupation: Politician
- Profession: Sociologist

Sebastián Fernando Depolo Cabrera (born 10 November 1976) is a Chilean politician.

In 2022, he was sent by the presidency of Gabriel Boric as ambassador of Chile to Brazil.
