= Masferrer =

Masferrer is a surname. Notable people with the surname include:

- Alberto Masferrer (1868–1932), Salvadoran essayist, philosopher, fiction writer and journalist
- Juan Masferrer (1940–2017), Chilean politician
- Rolando Masferrer (1918–1975), Cuban lawyer, congressman, newspaper publisher and political activist
