= Álvaro Díaz Pérez =

Chilean economist and politician (1950–2021)

Undersecretary of the Economy and Small Businesses
- In office 11 March 2000 – 29 June 2004
- Preceded by: Luis Sánchez Castellón
- Succeeded by: Carlos Álvarez Voullieme

Chile Ambassador to Brazil
- In office 2007–2010
- President: Michelle Bachelet
- Preceded by: Eduardo Mena Keymer
- Succeeded by: Fernando Schmidt

Personal details
- Born: 1950
- Died: 13 December 2021 (aged 70–71)
- Party: PS
- Occupation: Economist

Álvaro Díaz Pérez (1950 – 13 December 2021) was a Chilean economist and politician. A member of the Socialist Party of Chile, he served as Undersecretary of the Economy and Small Businesses from 2000 to 2004 and was Chile's Ambassador to Brazil from 2007 to 2010.
