= Aníbal Pérez (politician) =

Chilean lawyer and politician

Aníbal Pérez Lobos
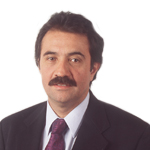
- Aníbal Pérez.

Deputy for the District #32 of Rancagua
- In office 1994–2002

Deputy for the District #35 of Santa Cruz and Pichilemu
- In office 2002–2006

Personal details
- Born: 20 January 1948 (age 78) Santa Cruz, Chile
- Party: Party for Democracy (PPD)
- Spouse: Sofía Vega
- Children: Three children
- Education: University of Concepción
- Occupation: Lawyer, politician
- Website: Aníbal Pérez Lobos

Aníbal Pérez Lobos (b. Santa Cruz, Chile, January 20, 1948) is a Chilean lawyer and politician, member of the Party for Democracy (PPD).

During his political career, he held office twice as deputy for the District 32 of Rancagua, and once as deputy for the District 35 of Santa Cruz and Pichilemu.

== Early life, studies ==
Aníbal Pérez was born in Santa Cruz, Colchagua Province, Chile, on January 20, 1948. He completed his primary studies at Federico Errázuriz Regional Institute (IRFE) in his hometown, and his secondary at Instituto Nacional Barros Arana in Santiago. Afterwards, Perez studied law at the University of Concepción.

== Political career ==
Aníbal Pérez began his political career as leader of the University Socialist Brigade at the University of Concepción, in 1970. In 1980, Pérez was appointed Regional Secretary of the Socialist Party in Colchagua and Cardenal Caro, an office he would hold until 1987. In 1986, he became president of the Democratic Alliance (Alianza Democrática) in these locations.

In 1987, Pérez participated in the creation of the Party for Democracy (PPD). Between 1990 and 1992, Pérez was member of the Regional Development Council (Consejo Regional de Desarrollo). In 1992, Pérez was appointed National Counselor of the Socialist Party.

Pérez was deputy for the District #32 of Rancagua between 1994 and 2002 during two terms, and for the District #35 of Santa Cruz and Pichilemu between 2002 and 2006. During his first term as deputy for the District #32, he became a member of the Committees on Constitution, Legislation and Justice, Economy, Promotion and Development, in addition to becoming a member of the CODELCO Special Committee. During his second term as deputy for the District #32, he was a member of the Committees on Constitution, Legislation and Justice and Labour and Social Security. During his term as deputy for the District #35, Pérez was a member of the Committees on Constitution, Legislation and Justice; Housing and Urban Development, which he presided; Special Commission for Drug Control and Fire Corps of Chile Special.

On August 1, 1996, he renounced from the Socialist Party of Chile, and later joined the Party for Democracy. From October 8, 1998, and until March 11, 1999, he was first vice president of the Chamber of Deputies of Chile.

In 2005, he ran for senator for the ninth circunscription of O'Higgins Region, but he lost against Juan Pablo Letelier of the Socialist Party (PS). In 2009, he ran for deputy for the District #32, but this time he was defeated by Juan Luis Castro (PS), a physician native to Pichilemu, and Alejandro García-Huidobro (UDI).

Aníbal Pérez is a member of the National Board of the Party for Democracy, during a term from 2010 until 2012.

In 2015, after resigning from the PPD, he joined the new Independent Regionalist Agrarian and Social Movement (MIRAS).

In 2017, Pérez joined the Social Green Regionalist Federation. Two years later, he was proposed as candidate for Regional Governor of O'Higgins Region.

== Sporting career ==
Aníbal Pérez has held the president office of Unión Santa Cruz Football Club, during 1983.

== Personal life ==
Pérez is married to Sofía Vega, with whom he had three children.
