= Green North Regional Force =

Political party in Chile

Green North Regional Force Fuerza Regional Norte Verde
- President: Agapito Santander
- Secretary: Miguel Ángel Rebolledo
- Founded: 22 December 2015
- Registered: 13 July 2016
- Dissolved: 25 April 2017
- Merged into: Social Green Regionalist Federation
- Headquarters: Nicanor Parra 2218, Illapel
- Ideology: Regionalism; Progressivism
- Political position: Centre to Centre-left
- Slogan: Nadie lo hará por nosotros
- Regional councillors: 2 / 278

Website
- fuerzaregionalnorteverde.cl

Green North Regional Force (Spanish: Fuerza Regional Norte Verde, FRNV) was a Chilean regionalist political party active only in the Coquimbo Region. It was legally constituted by the Electoral Service of Chile from 2015 until 2017, when it merged into the Social Green Regionalist Federation.

== History ==
The Green North Regional Force was founded on October 26, 2015. The party's registration and constitution were documented in a public deed issued on 22 December 2015 in the Official Journal of the Republic of Chile.

The party was formed by various individuals who had left the New Majority after becoming disenchanted with Michelle Bachelet's government, especially following Bachelet's decision to replace the Intendant of the Region of Coquimbo, Hanne Utreras, with Claudio Ibáñez. The creation of the party had the support of several prominent political figures in the region, such as Sergio Gahona, a deputy for the (UDI).

The FRNV described itself as a regionalist and progressive party, with its main focus being on human beings and their rights. The party's registration was initially rejected on the 4th of July, 2016 for failing to reach the minimum number of signatures required. On the 13th of July, the errors were corrected and the party was finally registered legally by the Electoral Service in the Region of Coquimbo.

The party participated in the 2016 municipal election, in which it supported several mayoral candidates, including Gustavo Hernandez in Combarbalá, Hanne Utreras in La Serena, Pedro Valdivia in Punitaqui and Edgar Ángel in Río Hurtado. It also submitted lists of candidates for councilors in all municipalities in the Coquimbo region.

Despite being active only in the Coquimbo region, the party intended to expand to other regions in the future. It also announced its intention to present parliamentary and regional board candidates in the 2017 Chilean general election.

In January 2017, the party agreed to merge with the Regional and Popular Front, the Social Agrarian Regionalist Independent Movement, and We Are Aysén in order to form the Social Green Regionalist Federation (Federación Regionalista Verde Social, FREVS). The FRNV was officially dissolved on April 25, 2017, when the constitution of the FREVS was legalized.
