= Diego Schalper =

Chilean politician

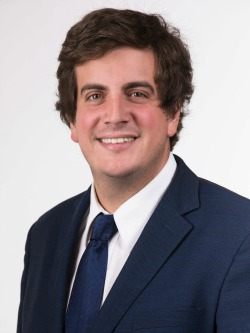

Member of the Chamber of Deputies
- Incumbent
- Assumed office 11 March 2018
- Constituency: District 15

Personal details
- Born: 14 March 1985 (age 41) Santiago, Chile
- Party: National Renewal (since 2010)
- Education: Pontifical Catholic University of Chile (LL.B); University of Göttingen (M.D.); University of Heidelberg (Ph.D candidate)
- Occupation: Politician
- Profession: Political scientist

Diego Ignacio Schalper Sepúlveda (born 14 March 1985) is a Chilean political scientist and politician currently serving as a deputy in the National Congress of Chile.

He holds a degree in political science from the Pontifical Catholic University of Chile and later pursued graduate studies in Germany, obtaining a Master’s degree from the University of Göttingen and completing doctoral coursework at the University of Heidelberg.

A member of the National Renewal party, Schalper emerged as a leading voice within the centrist and liberal-conservative factions. He has stood out for his staunch defense of institutionalism and his role as one of the principal defenders of President Sebastián Piñera during the 2019–2020 Chilean protests.

Known for his articulate interventions in Congress and media presence, Schalper has also led RN’s internal debate around youth renewal and ideological clarity.

== Biography ==
He is the son of Jorge Schalper and Paulina Sepúlveda, and was born in Santiago. He studied at Instituto Alemán de Santiago, where he completed his secondary education in 2002.

After graduating with a degree in political science from the Pontifical Catholic University of Chile (PUC), he pursued postgraduate studies in Germany. He obtained a Master’s degree in Intercultural theology and Political ethics from the University of Göttingen, and later joined the University of Heidelberg as a doctoral student.

== Political career ==
Schalper joined Renovación Nacional (RN) in 2010 and soon became involved in youth leadership, helping to reorganize RN’s base in the O'Higgins Region. In the 2017 parliamentary elections, he ran for District 15 (which includes Rancagua, Graneros and other communes) and was elected for the 2018–2022 term –the LV legislative period–.

In Congress, he served on the standing committees of Constitution, Legislation, Justice and Regulations; Culture, Arts and Communications; and National Defense.

During the Estallido Social and subsequent constitutional process, Schalper became a prominent spokesperson of the government’s position in Parliament, frequently clashing with the opposition and denouncing what he perceived as «populist destabilization».

In 2021, he was reelected for the 2022–2026 legislative term and has continued to serve on key parliamentary committees. Schalper is also part of RN’s Political Commission and is considered one of its future leadership prospects.
