= Jaime Gazmuri =

Chilean politician

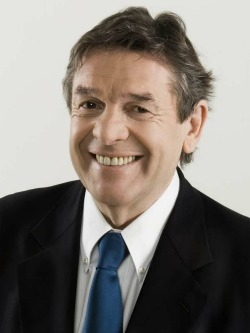
- Jaime Gazmuri in 2014.

Head of Televisión Nacional de Chile
- Incumbent
- Assumed office 23 September 2025
- President: Gabriel Boric
- Preceded by: Francisco Vidal

Ambassador of Chile to Venezuela
- In office 25 May 2023 – 7 January 2025
- President: Gabriel Boric
- Preceded by: Pedro Felipe Ramírez

Ambassador of Chile to Brazil
- In office 18 March 2014 – 11 March 2018
- President: Michelle Bachelet
- Preceded by: Fernando Schmidt
- Succeeded by: Fernando Schmidt

Member of the Senate
- In office 11 March 1990 – 11 March 2010
- Preceded by: Congress reestablished
- Succeeded by: Andrés Zaldívar Larraín

General Secretary of the MAPU–OC
- In office 7 March 1973 – 1985
- Preceded by: Position created
- Succeeded by: Position abolished

Personal details
- Born: 4 May 1944 (age 82) Chillán, Chile
- Party: Socialist Party (1985–)
- Other political affiliations: Party for Democracy (1989); MAPU–OC (1973–1985); MAPU (1969–1973); Christian Democratic Party (1964–1969)
- Education: University of Chile
- Occupation: Agronomist, academic, consultant and politician
- Website: www.jaimegazmuri.cl

Jaime Rodrigo Gazmuri Mujica is a Chilean agricultural engineer, politician, socialist, and diplomat. He served as Senator of the Republic representing the 10th District (Maule Norte) for three consecutive terms, from 1990 to 2010.

Then, he was Ambassador of Chile to Brazil, from March 2014 to March 2018, during the second presidency of President Michelle Bachelet. Since January 2020, he has been a minister of the Electoral Qualifying Court (Tricel).

== Early life and education ==
He was born on April 5, 1944, in Chillán. He is the son of Jaime Gazmuri Pesse and María Inés Mujica Petri. He is married to Paulina Elissetche Hurtado, a graduate in business management who was a councilor for the commune of Talca for two consecutive terms, between 2004 and 2012.

He completed his primary and secondary studies at the Colegio del Verbo Divino in Santiago. Then he completed his higher education at the Faculty of Agronomy of the University of Chile, where he obtained the title of agronomist with a mention in economics agrarian.

== Professional career ==
In the professional area, between 1965 and 1972 he participated in academic and government-linked to the agricultural sector. In 1965, during the administration of President Eduardo Frei Montalva, he was director of the Peasant Development Division of the Agricultural Development Institute (INDAP).

He was a researcher and consultant regarding the policies of the agrarian reform that was in progress in those years.

=== Investigator ===
Between 1967 and 1968 it was the national counterpart of the Training Department of the Institute for Training and Research in Agrarian Reform (ICIRA), a joint program between the Food and Agriculture Organization of the United Nations (FAO) and the Government of Chile.

In 1970 he assumed the direction and was a professor at the Center for Agrarian Studies of the Catholic University of Chile (PUC). 2 In the same way, he was a researcher at the Center for Economic and Social Development of Latin America (DESAL) and ECLAC.

During his exile because of the military dictatorship, between 1984 and 1988, he was an Agricultural Development consultant for the FAO and the UNDP, working in Africa and Central America. He was also part of the World Bank for the Argentine government at the Census Development Institute (INDEC) in Buenos Aires.

== Political career ==
=== PDC and MAPU ===
He started in politics when he joined the Christian Democratic Party (PDC) around 1964, in a full assumption of Frei Montalva as President of the Republic.

His figuration became notorious in 1969 when, together with other members of the community, they founded the United Popular Action Movement (MAPU), demonstrating their dissent from their former political establishment. In 1972, he became secretary-general of the MAPU and in the government of President Salvador Allende, he was a member of the National Committee of the ruling Popular Unity (UP) coalition, until 1973.

=== Military dictatorship and exile ===
After the coup of September 11, 1973 he led his party underground for seven years. Later, in 1980, he went into exile settling first in Italy, in the city of Rome, and from 1984, in Argentina, in the city of Buenos Aires.

While he was abroad he made numerous unsuccessful attempts to enter the country until, in 1985, he returned definitively and joined the Socialist Party of Chile (PS), where he has been part of the Central Committee and, since 1990, of the Political Commission. Since 1997, he is a member of the FAO in Chile.

=== Senator ===
In the 1989 parliamentary elections he ran for the Senate on behalf of the Party for Democracy (PPD), for the Tenth Senatorial District, corresponding to the VII Maule Region, for the 1990–1994 legislative period. He was elected with 56,826 votes corresponding to 21.06% of the total valid votes, forming part of the dubbing in the Circumscription together with the Christian Democrat Máximo Pacheco Gómez. During this period, he was a member of the permanent commissions for National Defense and Finance, the Joint Budget Commission, and the executive committee of the Modernization Project of the National Congress. Bicameral Interparliamentary Commission Argentine . He was also part of the Chilean delegations to the World Interparliamentary Union in Copenhagen (in 1993) and to the United Nations General Assembly in New York (1994).

In the parliamentary elections of 1993 he went for re-election for the same 10th constituency, representing the Socialist Party, for the period 1994–2002, being re-elected with 82,259 votes, equivalent to 30.06% of the total number of votes. He continued his work in the Permanent Commission for National Defense, which he chaired between 1999 and 2001. He also joined the Agriculture, Labor, and Social Welfare, and Foreign Relations commissions, which he chaired from 1998 to 1999. 2 He was also a member of the National Commission for the Development of Biotechnology, between 2000 and 2002, of the Joint Budget Commission, of the executive committee of the Network of Legislative Leaders of the Americas, and of the Bicameral Commission Chilean-Argentine interparliamentary. In missions abroad, he joined the Chilean delegation to the European Parliament in Brussels, in 1998 and Strasbourg, in 2002.

In the parliamentary elections of 2001 he obtained his third re-election in the same District 10, for the period corresponding to 2002–2010, with 77,828 votes, equivalent to 30.51% of the votes validly cast. During this period he was a member of the permanent commissions for the economy, Housing and Urbanism, the Internal Regime, and the Treasury. He chaired the permanent commissions on Foreign Affairs, Fisheries, Maritime Interests, and National Defense, again.

Consequently he participated in the special mixed budget commissions, in charge of analyzing the report issued by the Chilean Institute of Ice Fields, which he chaired, and in the Parliamentary Association Commission between the European Parliament and the National Congress. Between 2004 and 2005, he was elected as vice president of the Senate, during the presidency of the militant of the Independent Democratic Union (UDI), Hernán Larraín.
