= Giovanna Roa =

Chilean constituent

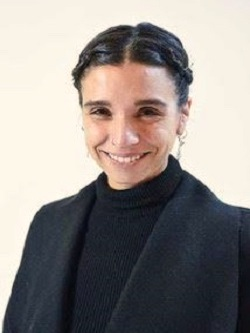

Member of the Constitutional Convention
- In office 4 July 2021 – 4 July 2022
- Constituency: 10th District

Personal details
- Born: 20 November 1986 (age 39) Santiago, Chile
- Party: Frente Amplio; Democratic Revolution
- Education: Pontifical Catholic University of Chile
- Profession: Designer

Giovanna Roa Cadin (born 20 November 1986) is a Chilean designer and politician.

She served as a member of the Constitutional Convention, representing the 10th electoral district of the Santiago Metropolitan Region.

== Biography ==
Roa Cadin was born on 20 November 1986 in Santiago. She is the daughter of Carlos Osvaldo Roa Valenzuela and Liliana Carla Cadin Cella.

She completed her primary and secondary education at Colegio Sagrados Corazones de Niñas in Providencia, graduating in 2004. She pursued higher education at the Pontifical Catholic University of Chile between 2005 and 2011, qualifying as a designer.

Between April 2014 and July 2016, she served as chief of staff of the National Health Fund (FONASA). Since 2018, she has worked as an associate researcher at the Organizational Engineering Center of the Department of Industrial Engineering at the University of Chile.

== Political career ==
Roa Cadin began his career in the Democratic Revolution (RD) party. In 2010, she served as vice president of the Student Federation of the Pontifical Catholic University of Chile (FEUC), participating in the student movement. She is co-director of the feminist cultural platform Ruidosa.

In the 2017 presidential elections, she was executive director of the presidential campaign of candidate Beatriz Sánchez. In the same year, she participated in the founding of the Broad Front coalition. She also served as a parliamentary advisor to RD deputy Maite Orsini.

In the elections held on 15–16 May 2021, she ran as a candidate for the Constitutional Convention representing the 10th electoral district of the Santiago Metropolitan Region as a member of RD within the Apruebo Dignidad electoral pact, receiving 3,875 votes (0.91% of the validly cast votes).
