= Pablo Paredes Muñoz =

Pablo Paredes

Personal details
- Born: 1 February 1982 (age 44) Santiago, Chile
- Party: Democratic Revolution
- Education: University of Santiago, Chile; University of Chile (MA)
- Occupation: Politician
- Profession: Playwright

Pablo Salvador Paredes Muñoz (Santiago de Chile, February 1, 1982) is a Chilean publicist, poet, playwright, and screenwriter for film and television, as well as a political activist. He was spokesperson for the Federation of Secondary Students of Santiago (Feses) and national coordinator of the Democratic Revolution. Since March 11, 2022, he has been director of the Secretariat of Communications within the government of Gabriel Boric.

== Biography ==
Paredes studied advertising and graduated in communications from the University of Santiago. He also obtained a master's degree in Political Communication from the University of Chile.

He is a member of the generation Novísima poesía latinoamericana, along with the poets Héctor Hernández Montecinos, Paula Ilabaca, and Diego Ramírez. As a playwright, he has participated in both film and television, particularly with the series El Reemplazante.

Paredes was director of the Iberoamerican Festival of Current Poetry "Poquita Fe". His plays have been staged in Chile and abroad and his poems have been translated into English, German, and Polish.

He has worked as an academic at the University of Santiago, teaching classes such as Social Communication or the Librettos y Guiones workshop, as well as at the universities of Chile and Católica. He has also been dedicated to the conceptualization of political campaigns, being a scriptwriter for the presidential candidacy of Beatriz Sánchez in 2017 and Gabriel Boric in 2021.
