= Álvaro Dias =

Álvaro Dias may refer to:

- Álvaro Costa Dias (born 1959), Brazilian politician, mayor of Natal (2018–present)
- Alvaro Dias (born 1944), Brazilian politician, former senator of the state of Paraná (1999–2023), and governor (1987–1991)
- Álvaro Dias (athlete) (1923–2005), Portuguese athlete

== See also ==
- Álvaro Díaz (disambiguation)
