= Raúl Soto =

Chilean politician (born 1987)

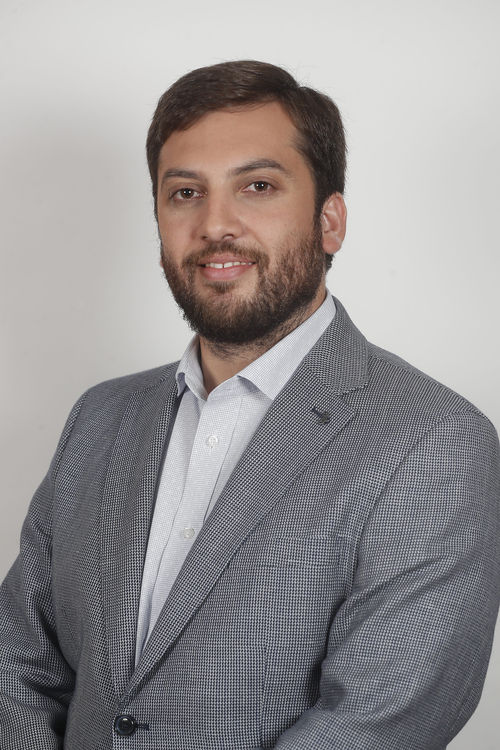

Member of the Chamber of Deputies
- Incumbent
- Assumed office 11 March 2018

President of the Chamber of Deputies
- In office 11 March 2022 – 7 November 2022
- Preceded by: Diego Paulsen
- Succeeded by: Vlado Mirosevic

Personal details
- Born: 20 November 1987 (age 38) Rengo, Cachapoal, Chile
- Party: Christian Democratic Party (until 2019); Party for Democracy (since 2020)
- Spouse: Natalia Bustamante Acevedo
- Children: 1
- Education: University of Chile

Raúl Humberto Soto Mardones (born 20 November 1987) is a Chilean lawyer and politician who served as President of the Chamber of Deputies of Chile in 2022.

== Early life and education ==
Soto was born in Rancagua on 20 November 1987. He is the son of Carlos Soto González, a former councillor and mayor of Rengo, and Marisol Mardones Reyes.

He completed his primary and secondary education in the commune of Rengo, attending Colegio La Paz and later Liceo Luis Urbina Flores, from which he graduated in 2005.

In 2006, he enrolled in the Faculty of Law at the University of Chile. He obtained his law degree with a thesis examining the legal effects of medical leave authorisation procedures and was admitted to the Chilean bar on 14 December 2014.

Soto later completed postgraduate diplomas in labour law and family law at the University of Chile and pursued graduate studies in politics and government at Diego Portales University.

== Professional career ==
Before holding elected office, Soto worked as a legal advisor at the National Training and Employment Service (SENCE) and at the Undersecretariat of Labour, both agencies under the Ministry of Labor and Social Welfare. He remained in these roles until December 2017.

== Political career ==
=== Early political activity ===
Soto began his political career as a member of the Christian Democratic Party (PDC). In the 2017 elections, he was elected to the Chamber of Deputies for the 15th district of the O'Higgins Region, representing the PDC within the Convergencia Democrática coalition. He received 9,026 votes, corresponding to 5.00% of the valid ballots cast.

On 26 August 2019, he resigned from the PDC after approximately three years of membership. In October 2019, he joined the Party for Democracy (PPD).

=== Parliamentary service ===
==== 2018–2022 term ====
Soto assumed office as deputy on 11 March 2018 for the 2018–2022 legislative term. During this period, he served on several standing committees, including Economy; Small and Medium Enterprises; Consumer Protection and Tourism; Family and Older Adults; Agriculture and Rural Development; and Labour and Social Security.

He also participated in several special investigative committees addressing matters such as alleged abuses by Chilean armed forces abroad, government actions during the COVID-19 pandemic, public security operations, and irregularities in public administration and judicial appointments. On 8 October 2019, he became a member of the PPD parliamentary committee.

==== 2022–2026 term ====
In the 2021 parliamentary elections, Soto was re-elected as deputy for the 15th district, representing the PPD within the New Social Pact coalition. He obtained 55,346 votes, or 27.87% of the valid votes, becoming the leading vote-getter in the district.

He began his second term on 11 March 2022. On the same date, he was elected President of the Chamber of Deputies, a position he held until 7 November 2022. The executive board during his presidency included Alexis Sepúlveda Soto as First Vice President and Claudia Mix Jiménez as Second Vice President.

During the 2022–2026 term, Soto served on the standing committees of Foreign Affairs; Internal Regime and Administration; and Finance. He also took part in special investigative committees related to public housing programs, alleged irregularities in tax and financial oversight agencies, and the purchase of property associated with former president Salvador Allende.

He was a member of the bicameral committee responsible for reviewing the regulations governing Chile’s new constituent body. His international activities included participation in an academic event organised by EGADE Business School of the Monterrey Institute of Technology in Mexico between 29 November and 3 December 2022, as well as attendance at the 149th Assembly of the Inter-Parliamentary Union held in Geneva between 20 and 28 March 2024.

In late November 2025, Soto became head of the PPD parliamentary caucus in the Chamber of Deputies.

== Electoral performance and political influence ==
Soto’s electoral support increased substantially over successive elections. After his initial election in 2017, he expanded his vote share in 2021. In the 2025 parliamentary elections, he obtained the highest regional vote total in the O'Higgins Region, receiving 64,377 votes and securing a third consecutive term as deputy.

Regional media described the result as historically high and indicative of his growing political influence. Due to statutory term limits, the 2026-2030 legislative period is expected to be his final term as a member of the Chamber of Deputies, leading to speculation about potential future candidacies, including a possible bid for the Senate.

== Role within the Party for Democracy ==
Following the 2025 parliamentary elections, Soto emerged as a potential candidate for the presidency of the Party for Democracy. His name has been promoted by party parliamentarians who regard him as a figure capable of strengthening coordination between the party leadership and its legislative caucus.

Party commentators have highlighted his critical stance toward government policies during the administration of President Gabriel Boric as a factor contributing to his prominence within the PPD. As of late 2025, Soto had not formally announced a candidacy, stating that internal party discussions should focus on political programs rather than individual leadership ambitions.

== Personal life ==
Soto is married to Natalia Bustamante Acevedo, and they have one child.
