= Juanma Valenzuela =

Chilean politician

Juan Marcelo Valenzuela
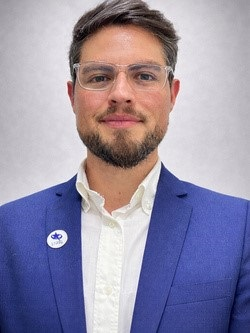

Member of the Chamber of Deputies
- Incumbent
- Assumed office 11 March 2026
- Constituency: 7th District

Personal details
- Born: 19 May 1986 (age 40) Valparaíso, Chile
- Party: Party of the People
- Education: University of Valparaíso
- Profession: Business administrator

Juan Marcelo Valenzuela Henríquez (born 19 May 1986), known as Juanma Valenzuela, is a Chilean politician and media-public figure. He was elected as a member of the Chamber of Deputies of Chile, representing the 7th District in the Region of Valparaíso.

Valenzuela emerged in public life as a local figure in Valparaíso, active in media and campaigning for representation of sectors he characterises as “outsiders” of traditional politics. He has used social media, streamed content, and publicly challenged established polling mechanisms.

In the 2025 parliamentary election Valenzuela ran in the 7th District for the Party of the People and secured his seat as part of a group of 14 elected deputies from the PDG. He emphasises representation of “emerging Chileans”, criticises pollsters, and positions himself as voice for those outside traditional political elites.

== Early life and education ==
Valenzuela was born in Valparaíso on 19 May 1986. He is the son of Juan Bautista Valenzuela Montes and Maritza Henríquez López.

He completed his primary education at Colegio Arturo Edwards in Valparaíso and his secondary education at Liceo Bicentenario Marítimo B-29 in the same city. He later studied business administration at the University of Valparaíso and also undertook studies in advertising.

== Professional career ==
He worked in the private sector, serving as commercial and communications manager of the pension advisory firm Felices y Forrados, which ceased operations in 2021.

Between 2012 and 2019 he was owner and principal director of the strategic communications agency Ponder, based in Viña del Mar, dedicated to political marketing consultancy. In that capacity he participated in electoral campaigns both in Chile and internationally, and founded the digital newspaper Granvalparaiso.cl.

He has also collaborated as a columnist on political communication and appeared as a panelist on specialized radio programs such as Radio Futuro. Since 2021 he has been part of the panel of the digital broadcast program Bad Boys, alongside Giancarlo Barbagelata, Pedro Gubernatti, and Franco Parisi.

== Political career ==
He is a founding member and militant of the Party of the People (Partido de la Gente), a political party established in 2019, in which he participated during its initial formation.

In the 2021 parliamentary elections he ran for the Chamber of Deputies representing the 7th District of the Valparaíso Region. He obtained 7,217 votes, equivalent to 2.02% of the valid votes cast, and was not elected.

In the October 2024 municipal elections he ran for mayor of Valparaíso, obtaining 31,036 votes, equivalent to 17.32% of the valid votes cast, but was not elected.

In the parliamentary elections of 16 November 2025 he ran for the Chamber of Deputies representing the 6th District of the Valparaíso Region as a candidate of the Party of the People within its electoral pact. He was elected with 26,166 votes, equivalent to 4.67% of the valid votes cast, for the 2026–2030 legislative period.

== Controversies ==
=== False bomb threat during APEC 2004 ===
In 2004, while completing his secondary education, he made a false bomb threat during the APEC summit sessions held at the Sheraton Hotel in Viña del Mar. Valenzuela was detained, although he was not prosecuted due to the sole decision of the provincial governor, Iván de la Maza, who chose to drop the criminal proceedings.

=== Irregularities in PDG campaign expenses ===
Following the 2021 presidential and parliamentary campaigns, he was questioned for handling the advertising for PDG candidates through "J.G.B.V.H.T. Publicidad y Marketing SpA", a company owned by both Valenzuela and Giancarlo Barbagelata, also a panelist on Bad Boys. This allowed the company to receive approximately 50 million pesos from Servel as reimbursements for electoral expenses. The company had been incorporated 18 days before the elections. The same procedure was repeated in the 2023 Constitutional Council elections, where advertising was again contracted through the company owned by Valenzuela and Barbagelata.
