= Alberto van Klaveren =

Dutch-born Chilean lawyer, political scientist and diplomat (born 1948)

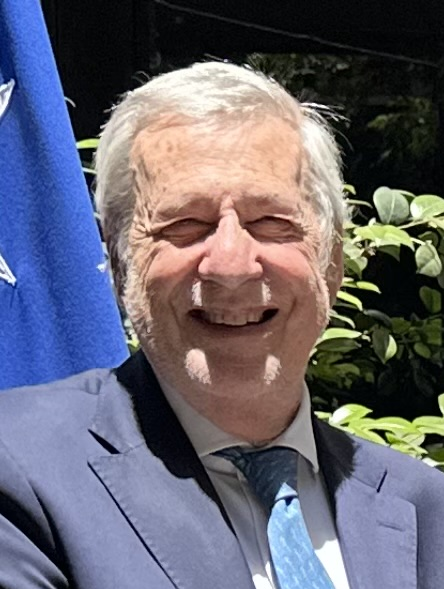
- Van Klaveren in 2024

Minister of Foreign Affairs of Chile
- In office 10 March 2023 – 11 March 2026
- President: Gabriel Boric
- Preceded by: Antonia Urrejola
- Succeeded by: Francisco Pérez Mackenna

Undersecretary for Foreign Affairs of Chile
- In office 11 March 2006 – 18 November 2009
- President: Michelle Bachelet
- Preceded by: Cristián Barros
- Succeeded by: Ángel Flisfisch

Personal details
- Born: 27 October 1948 (age 78) Amsterdam, Netherlands
- Education: University of Chile (LL.B); University of Denver (M.D.); Leiden University (PhD)

Albert Leo "Alberto" van Klaveren Stork (born 27 October 1948) is a Dutch-born Chilean lawyer, political scientist, and diplomat who served as Minister of Foreign Affairs (2023–2026). Previously, he served as the Undersecretary for Foreign Affairs of Chile between 2006 and 2009. Van Klaveren also represented Chile in the International Court of Justice in the case regarding the Chilean–Peruvian maritime dispute. Before assuming his post as a minister, he taught at the University of Chile.

== Early life ==
Van Klaveren's parents were Jewish Holocaust survivors in the Netherlands. In 1950, they decided to emigrate to Chile, as relatives of van Klaveren's mother were already present in the country. Van Klaveren studied law at the University of Chile and earned an additional MA degree in International Studies at the Graduate School of International Studies at the University of Denver.

== Career ==
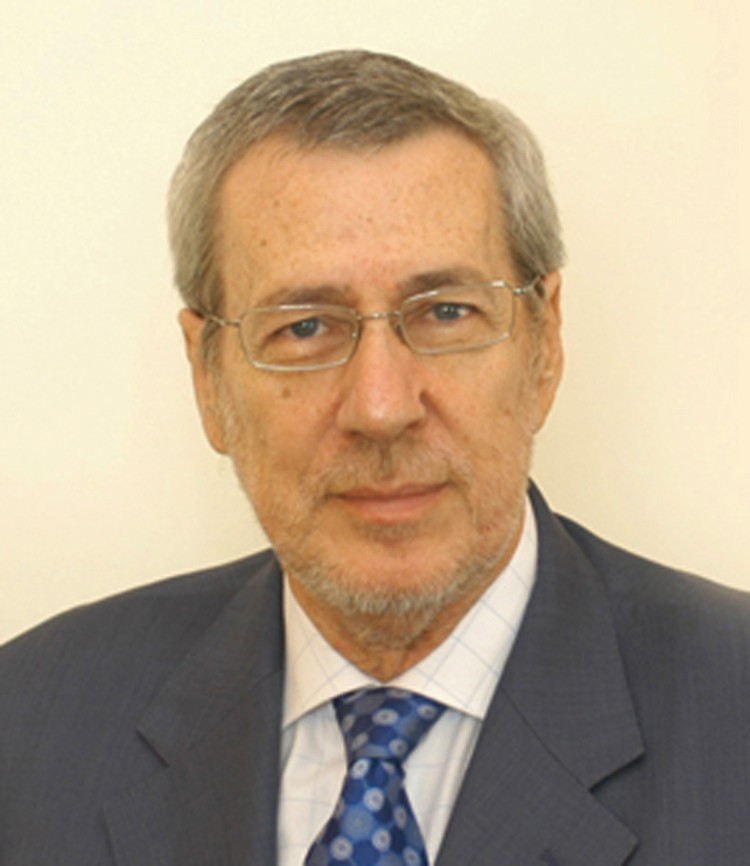
Official portrait of van Klaveren in 2006, while he was Undersecretary for Foreign Affairs.

In 1972, van Klaveren began working for the Institute for International Studies and the Faculty of Law at the University of Chile. From 1985 and 1992, he worked for the Institute for European-Latin American Relations and the Instituto Universitario Ortega y Gasset, both located in Spain. He was also an Associate Investigator at the Institute for Political Research at Heidelberg University between 1988 and 1990.

Van Klaveren returned to Chile in 1992, where he started working for the Ministry of Foreign Affairs and resumed his position at the Institute for International Studies. He served as the director of the institute for 18 months and as Director for Policy Planning at the Foreign Ministry between 1996 and 2001. In May 2001, he was appointed as the Chilean Ambassador to the European Union. Three years later, in 2004, the Chilean embassies to the European Union, Belgium and Luxembourg merged and van Klaveren became the ambassador to all three. He served in this position until his appointment as Undersecretary for Foreign Affairs in 2006, where he remained until 2009.

In 2008, van Klaveren became the lawyer representing Chile before the International Court of Justice in the case regarding the Chilean–Peruvian maritime dispute. After the decision in the case in January 2014, van Klaveren stated that Chile regretted the decision of the Court.

Van Klaveren currently teaches International Relations and European International Relations at the University of Chile. He has been a board member of the U.S.-Chile Fulbright Commission since May 2015.

In March 2023, van Klaveren replaced Antonia Urrejola as Minister of Foreign Affairs.

== Personal life ==
Van Klaveren is fluent in Spanish, English, and Dutch, and has some knowledge of French. He is married and has two children.
