= Ángel Flisfisch =

Chilean lawyer (1941–2022)

Angel Flisfisch
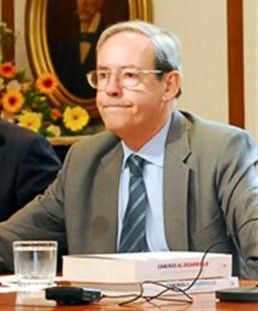
- Flisfisch in March 2009.

Undersecretary of Foreign Affairs of Chile
- In office 18 November 2009 – 11 March 2010
- President: Michelle Bachelet
- Preceded by: Alberto van Klaveren
- Succeeded by: Fernando Schmidt

Chilean Undersecretary of the Navy
- In office 2000–2002
- President: Ricardo Lagos
- Preceded by: Renán Fuentealba Vildósola
- Succeeded by: Patricio Morales Aguirre

Chilean Undersecretary of Aviation
- In office 13 November 1995 – 11 March 2000
- President: Eduardo Frei Ruiz-Tagle
- Preceded by: Mario Fernández Baeza
- Succeeded by: Nelson Hadad Heresy

Undersecretary General of the Presidency of Chile
- In office 11 March 1994 – 1 June 1995
- President: Eduardo Frei Ruiz-Tagle
- Preceded by: Ricardo Solari
- Succeeded by: Jorge Rosenblut Ratinoff

Personal details
- Born: 9 May 1941
- Died: 8 May 2022 (aged 80)
- Education: University of Chile
- Profession: Lawyer

Ángel Flisfisch Fernández (9 May 1941 – 8 May 2022) was a Chilean diplomat lawyer, researcher, and politician. He held various relevant positions during the administrations of the Concertación de Partidos por la Democracia governed the country between 1990 and 2010. He served as Undersecretary of Foreign Affairs of Chile from 2009 to 2010 and Ambassador of Chile in Singapore.

== Education ==
He studied law at the University of Chile and did postgraduate studies in political science at the Latin American Faculty of Social Sciences (FLACSO) and at the University of Michigan, where he obtained a master's degree in political science.

== Career ==
He served as Undersecretary of Aviation, Under Secretary of the Navy, and Under Secretary for Foreign Affairs. He also held the position of Secretary Pro Tempore of the Union of South American Nations (UNASUR), and Director of Planning of the Foreign Affairs. At the academic level, he was director of FLACSO in Santiago and a member of the board of directors of Universidad Diego Portales. He also published in the Center for Sociological Research (CIS) and the Center for Public Studies (CEP).

== Publications ==
- Studies on the party system in Chile.
- Consensus, pact, project, and democratic stability.
- Politics as a democratic commitment.
- Conceptual models of politics.
- Intellectuals and institutions of culture.
- Parties and Democracy.
- Chilean Neoliberalism: the functions of dogmatism.
- The spirit of democratic capitalism
