= Alfonso Orueta =

Chilean politician (1929–2012)

Alfonso Orueta Ansoleaga (3 November 1929 – 3 October 2012) was a Chilean politician and football manager.

== Biography ==
Orueta studied in the O'Higgins Institute of Rancagua. In 1971, he was elected mayor of Rancagua, holding the office until 1973. He was president of the O'Higgins Football Club of Rancagua between 1976 and 1982. He also was president of the Chilean Football Federation, between 1981 and 1982.

In late 1980s, he became a member of National Renewal (RN), and in 1988, he was appointed mayor of Rancagua by President Augusto Pinochet. He left the office the next year to become a candidate for senator in the 1989 parliamentary elections. Orueta was unsuccessful in the election, as Concert of Parties for Democracy (Concertación) doubled the number of votes obtained by the Democracy and Progress alliance (Democracia y Progreso), being elected Anselmo Sule and Nicolás Díaz. In 1997, he was a candidate for deputy for the District #32 of Rancagua in that year's elections, however, Alejandro García-Huidobro and Aníbal Pérez Lobos were elected.
