= Juan Masferrer =

Chilean politician

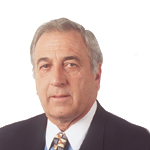

Member of the Chamber of Deputies
- In office 11 March 1990 – 11 March 2010
- Succeeded by: Javier Macaya
- Constituency: District 34

Personal details
- Born: 19 November 1940
- Died: 28 December 2017 (aged 77)
- Party: Independent Democratic Union
- Occupation: politician

Juan Masferrer Pellizzari (19 November 1940 – 28 December 2017) was a Chilean politician.

Born in 1940, he attended the Escuela de Especialidades de la Fuerza Aérea. A member of the Independent Democratic Union, Masferrer was first elected to the Chamber of Deputies in 1989 as a representative of District 34.

He retained his seat in four consecutive reelection campaigns, in 1993, 1997, 2001, and 2005. Masferrer was succeeded by Javier Macaya in 2010. Masferrer married Jacqueline Vidal Delaigue, with whom he had three children. He died on 28 December 2017, aged 77.

== Early life and family ==
Masferrer was born on 17 November 1940 in Angol, the son of Luis Guillermo Masferrer and Fresia Yolanda Pellizzari. He was married to Jacqueline Vidal Delaigue and was the father of three children, including deputy Juan Manuel Masferrer.

He completed his primary and secondary education at Colegio Santa Ana in Angol. He later entered the School of Specialties of the Chilean Air Force, where he obtained the title of Jet Engine Technician in 1969.

Between 1978 and 1980, he served as director of Club O’Higgins, and from 1985 onward, as director of the Las Cabras Fire Department and honorary president of the Club de Huasos of the same locality.

In the professional sphere, until 1981 he worked as commercial manager of the company Abastible.

== Political career ==
He was appointed mayor of the commune of Las Cabras, a position he held until 1989. In 1988, he was invited by the Kellogg Foundation to the United States to attend courses on primary health care in rural areas.

He served as a deputy between 1990 and 2010 for five consecutive terms.

In 2010, he was appointed Ambassador of Chile to Guatemala during the first administration of President Sebastián Piñera, serving until 2014. In 2016, he was elected councilor of the commune of Las Cabras.

He died on 28 December 2017 in Rancagua.

== Recognitions ==
He was distinguished by the newspaper Los Pioneros of Rengo as “Best Mayor of the Region” and received recognition from the Asociación de Catamarán for his participation in improvements to Lake Rapel. In 1989, he was named Illustrious Son of Las Cabras.
