= Fernando Schmidt =

Chilean diplomat

Fernando Schmidt Ariztia
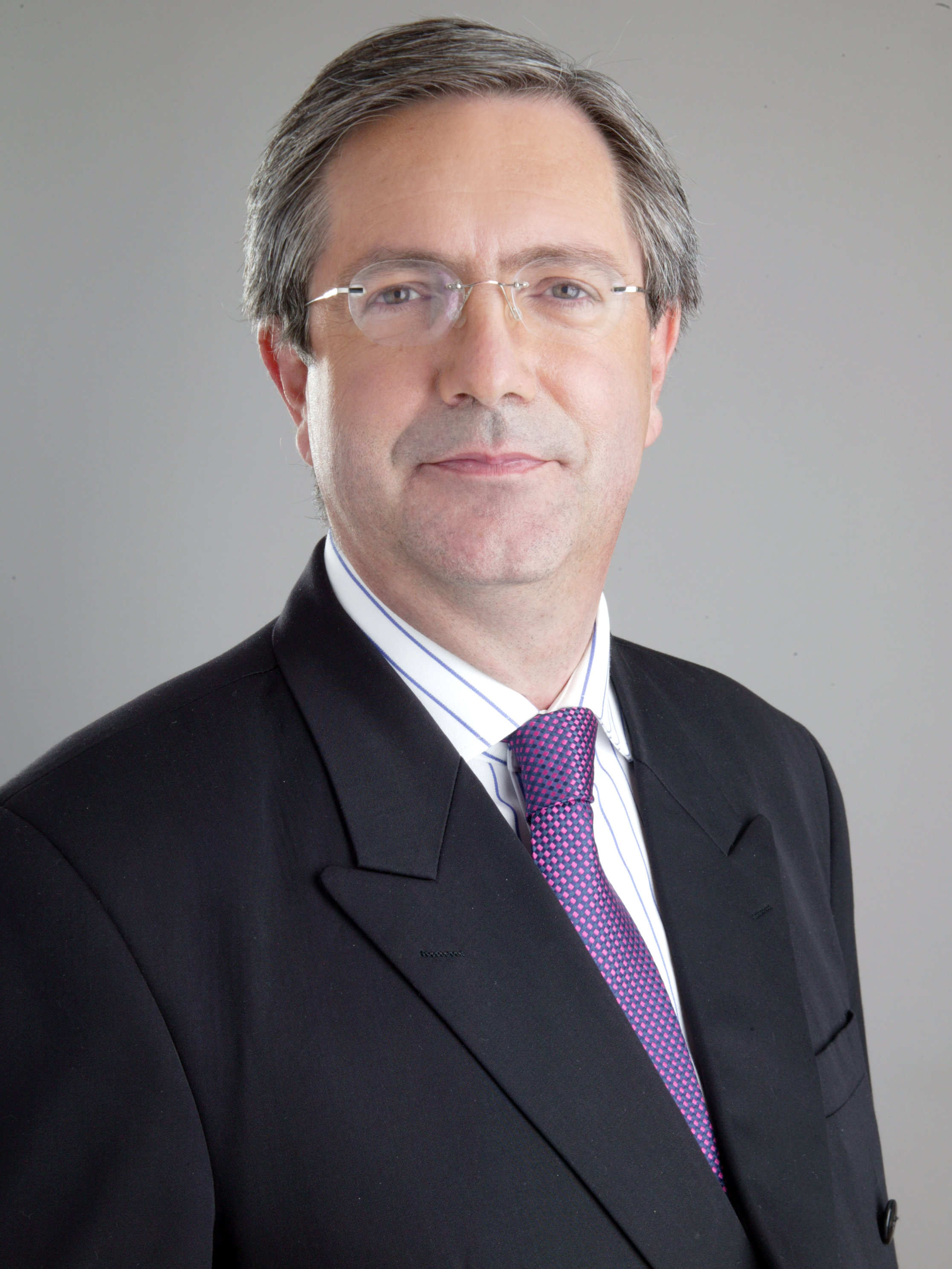
- Fernando Schmidt Ariztía in 2010.

Ambassador of Chile in Brazil
- In office April 19, 2018 – April 1, 2022
- President: Sebastián Piñera Echenique
- Preceded by: Jaime Gazmuri
- Succeeded by: Sebastián Depolo
- In office 2012–2014
- President: Sebastián Piñera Echenique
- Preceded by: Jorge Montero Figueroa
- Succeeded by: Jaime Gazmuri

Undersecretary of Foreign Affairs of Chile
- In office March 11, 2010 – November 12, 2012
- President: Sebastián Piñera Echenique
- Preceded by: Ángel Flisfisch
- Succeeded by: Alfonso Silva Navarro

Ambassador of Chile in Hungary, and concurrent in Bosnia and Herzegovina
- In office 2009–2010
- President: Michelle Bachelet Jeria
- Preceded by: Carmen Hertz Cádiz
- Succeeded by: Rodrigo Nieto Maturana

Ambassador of Chile in Australia and concurrent in Papua New Guinea
- In office 2004–2006
- President: Ricardo Lagos Escobar

Ambassador of Chile in South Korea
- In office 2000–2004
- President: Ricardo Lagos Escobar

Personal details
- Born: December 4, 1954 (age 71) Santiago, Chile
- Party: Independent
- Spouse: Ana Hernandez Galilea
- Children: Teodoro, Fernando, Francisca, Rafael, Santiago and Teresa
- Parent(s): Fernando Schmidt Henríquez; Amelia Ariztía Ruiz
- Relatives: Teodoro Schmidt Quezada (grandfather)

Fernando Schmidt Ariztía (born December 4, 1954) is a Chilean politician and diplomat who currently serves as Ambassador of Chile in Brazil from April 19, 2018. He served as Undersecretary of Foreign Affairs of Chile from March 11, 2010, to November 12, 2012. Ambassador of Chile in Hungary, and concurrent in Bosnia and Herzegovina from 2009 to 2010. Ambassador of Chile in Australia and concurrent in Papua New Guinea from 2004 to 2006. Ambassador of Chile in South Korea and concurrent in Mongolia from 2000 to 2004.

== Early life and education ==
Fernando was born in Santiago Chile. He is the son of Fernando Schmidt Henríquez and Amelia Ariztía Ruiz and grandson of the engineer and Minister of Public Works Teodoro Schmidt Quezada. He completed his graduation from the Diplomatic Academy of Chile and Master in International Relations at the Ortega y Gasset University Institute in Madri.

== Diplomatic career ==
In 1974 he joined the Ministry of Foreign Affairs of Chile. From 1981 to 1983 he served as Third and Second Secretary at the Embassy in Bonn, Germany. From 1984 to 1986 he worked as Consul in Ushuaia, Argentina. He served as First Secretary in the Chilean Delegation to the OAS, Washington from 1986 to 1989. From 1989 to 1991he served as a Head of the OAS Department in the Ministry of Foreign Affairs. He served as a Counselor and Minister Counselor at the Embassy in Spain from 1991 to 1996. Then From 1996 to 1998, he served as Deputy Director and Director for European Affairs at the Ministry of Foreign Affairs. Later he served as Director of North America from 1998 to 2000.
