= Alejandro García-Huidobro =

Chilean politician

Alejandro García Huidobro
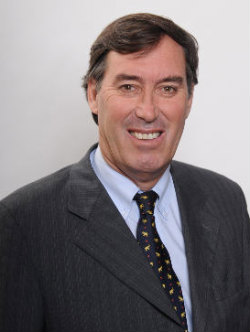

Member of the Senate of Chile
- In office 2 August 2011 – 11 March 2022
- Preceded by: Andrés Chadwick
- Constituency: 8th Circumscription; 9th Circumscription

Member of the Chamber of Deputies
- In office 11 March 1994 – 2 August 2011
- Preceded by: Federico Mekis
- Succeeded by: Issa Kort

President Union of the Centrist Center
- In office 7 June 1996 – 24 January 2000
- Preceded by: Ángela Vivanco
- Succeeded by: Carlos del Campo

Personal details
- Born: 19 April 1952 (age 74) Santiago, Chile
- Party: Union of the Centrist Center (1999−2000); Independent Democratic Union (2000−present)
- Spouse: María Eugenia Llompart
- Children: Five
- Education: University of Chile (LL.B)
- Occupation: Politician
- Profession: Lawyer

Alejandro García-Huidobro Sanfuentes (born 19 April 1952) is a Chilean politician who served as a member of the Senate of his country.

A member of the Senate of Chile, García-Huidobro represented the 8th Senatorial Circumscription ―O'Higgins Region― for the 2014–2022 term and previously the 9th Senatorial District of the same region between 2011 and 2018. He earlier served as a member of the Chamber of Deputies of Chile for District No. 32 (O'Higgins Region) for five consecutive terms between 1994 and 2011.

== Early life and family ==
He was born on 19 April 1952 in Santiago, Chile. He is the son of Alejandro García Huidobro Garcés, a politician of the Conservative Party, farmer, and former Intendant of O'Higgins Province during the government of President Jorge Alessandri, and Denise Lucienne Sanfuentes Schiff.

He is the brother of former Regional Councillor of the O'Higgins Region, Felipe García Huidobro Sanfuentes. He is married to María Eugenia Llompart and is the father of five children.

He completed his primary and secondary education at the Instituto Bernardo O’Higgins of Rancagua and at the Colegio Sagrados Corazones de Manquehue in Santiago. He later entered the University of Chile, where he qualified as a political scientist.

== Political career ==
He began his political activity as a trade association leader in 1977.

Between 1981 and 1990, he served as president of the Association of Farmers of Requínoa. At the same time, between 1984 and 1992, he was president of the Southern Riverbank Small Farmers Organization, and between 1988 and 1993, vice president of the Confederation of Agricultural Producers of Chile.

In 1990, he joined the National Center Democracy Party, serving as a member of its Central Board. He later became a member of the Union of the Centrist Center (UCC) party, and subsequently of the Union of the Progressive Cenrist Center Party (UCCP), where he served as vice president and later as president between June 1996 and January 2000.

He later joined the Independent Democratic Union (UDI).

In the November 2021 parliamentary elections, he decided not to seek re-election for the 8th Senatorial District of the O'Higgins Region.
