= Aníbal Pérez-Liñán =

Argentine political scientist

- Born: 1969 (age 56–57); Buenos Aires, Argentina
- Known for: Research on impeachment and regime change in Latin America

Academic background
- Education: Universidad del Salvador (B.A.); University of Notre Dame (PhD)
- Thesis: (2001)
- Website: anibalperezlinan.com

Aníbal Pérez-Liñán (born 1969) is an Argentine political scientist who studies democratization, political institutions, and the rule of law in Latin America. He is professor of political science and global affairs at the University of Notre Dame and director of the Kellogg Institute for International Studies. He taught at the University of Pittsburgh until 2018, when he returned to Notre Dame.

He is the author of Presidential Impeachment and the New Political Instability in Latin America (Cambridge University Press, 2007) and, with Scott Mainwaring, of Democracies and Dictatorships in Latin America (Cambridge University Press, 2013). In 2016 La Tercera described him as a specialist in presidential impeachments in the region and called his book on the subject a reference work among political scientists.

Democracies and Dictatorships in Latin America received book awards from the American Political Science Association and the Latin American Studies Association. From 2016 to 2021 he was editor-in-chief of the Latin American Research Review. In 2022 he and Mariana Llanos received APSA's Jewell-Loewenberg Prize for an article in Legislative Studies Quarterly.

== Early life and education ==
Pérez-Liñán was born in Buenos Aires in 1969. He earned a B.A. in political science from the Universidad del Salvador in 1993 and a Ph.D. from the University of Notre Dame in 2001.

== Career ==
He joined the University of Pittsburgh in 2001 and stayed until 2018. He was a core faculty member of its Center for Latin American Studies and, from 2014 to 2016, director of graduate studies in political science. In 2016 he became editor-in-chief of the Latin American Research Review, the journal of the Latin American Studies Association (LASA), effective January 1. He was the eighth editor of the journal, which the association founded in 1965, and left the post in 2021.

He returned to Notre Dame in 2018 as professor of political science and global affairs, with a joint appointment in the Department of Political Science and the Keough School of Global Affairs. In February 2022 he was named director of the Kellogg Institute for International Studies, effective July 1, succeeding Paolo Carozza.

He served on LASA's Executive Council from June 1, 2022, to May 31, 2025.

== Research ==
=== Presidential impeachment ===
In Presidential Impeachment and the New Political Instability in Latin America (2007), Pérez-Liñán argues that military coups became rare in Latin America after the return to democracy in the 1980s, but that presidents were still removed in political crises. He treats impeachment as the main constitutional tool civilian elites used to remove unpopular presidents, and links removals to falling approval, hostile coalitions in congress, and investigative journalism. Fondo de Cultura Económica published a Spanish edition in 2009.

John M. Carey, reviewing the book in International Studies Review, wrote that it examined the main trend in Latin American presidentialism over the previous 25 years. Militaries no longer seized the state, he noted, but crises were often resolved by the premature removal of the president, by the legislature or with its assent—what Carey framed as a pattern of "bloodless coups." Santiago López Cariboni, in Revista Uruguaya de Ciencia Política, set the book against the claim, associated with Juan Linz and Arturo Valenzuela, that deep conflict between president and congress threatens democratic breakdown. He wrote that Pérez-Liñán challenges two ideas: that Latin American democracies cannot withstand that conflict, and that presidents are too strong for legislatures to enforce horizontal accountability. López Cariboni added that the book is not a defense of presidentialism, and that Pérez-Liñán rejects both the reading of impeachment as a parliamentary vote of no confidence and the reading of protests as an expansion of citizenship.

In a later article, Pérez-Liñán argued that impeachment had been stretched for political purposes and should not be confused with a coup, and that the more common threat to democratic survival in contemporary Latin America came from concentration of power in the executive.

=== Democracies and dictatorships ===
With Scott Mainwaring, he wrote Democracies and Dictatorships in Latin America: Emergence, Survival, and Fall (2013). The book covers regime change in Latin America from the early twentieth century to about 2010. The authors argue that outcomes depend less on class structure or economic performance than on whether powerful actors prefer democracy, how radical their policy goals are, and how international influences operate.

Miriam Kornblith, in Americas Quarterly, called the book a significant contribution and a coherent framework for regime change in the region. Matías López, in Revista de Ciencia Política, accepted the emphasis on actors' normative preferences and on international pressure. He argued that the book does not explain whose preferences should matter, and that its observational design is weak evidence against structural theories of democratization.

With other authors he has also written on United States democracy assistance and on military coups. A 2007 article in World Politics, with Steven Finkel and Mitchell Seligson, examined U.S. foreign assistance and democracy building from 1990 to 2003, arguing that democracy-related aid was associated with measurable improvements in democratic outcomes over that period. With Fabrice Lehoucq, he studied how political competition relates to the risk of military coups in Latin America.

== Awards ==
Democracies and Dictatorships in Latin America was a co-winner of the 2014 Best Book Award of APSA's Comparative Democratization section (later Democracy and Autocracy). It also received the 2014 Donna Lee Van Cott Book Award of LASA's Political Institutions section.

In 2022 he and Mariana Llanos received the Jewell-Loewenberg Prize (Comparative Politics) of APSA's Legislative Studies section for their 2021 Legislative Studies Quarterly article "Oversight or Representation? Public Opinion and Impeachment Resolutions in Argentina and Brazil."

== Selected works ==
- Pérez-Liñán, Aníbal (2007). Presidential Impeachment and the New Political Instability in Latin America. Cambridge: Cambridge University Press. ISBN 978-0-521-86942-3.
- Mainwaring, Scott; Pérez-Liñán, Aníbal (2013). Democracies and Dictatorships in Latin America: Emergence, Survival, and Fall. Cambridge: Cambridge University Press. ISBN 978-0-521-15224-2.
- Finkel, Steven E.; Pérez-Liñán, Aníbal; Seligson, Mitchell A. (2007). "The Effects of U.S. Foreign Assistance on Democracy Building, 1990–2003". World Politics. 59 (3): 404–439. doi:10.1353/wp.2007.0024.
- Llanos, Mariana; Pérez-Liñán, Aníbal (2021). "Oversight or Representation? Public Opinion and Impeachment Resolutions in Argentina and Brazil". Legislative Studies Quarterly. 46 (2): 357–389. doi:10.1111/lsq.12281.
