= Social Green Regionalist Federation =

Political party in Chile

Social Green Regionalist Federation Federación Regionalista Verde Social
- Abbreviation: FREVS
- President: Flavia Torrealba Diaz
- General Secretary: Félix Bugueño Sotelo
- Founded: 24 January 2017
- Legalised: 25 April 2017
- Merger of: FREP; FRNV; MIRAV; Somos Aysén
- Headquarters: Avenida El Bosque 1123, Providencia, Santiago
- Youth wing: Youth Social Green Regionalist Federation (JFREVS)
- Membership (2026): 14,815
- Ideology: Regionalism; Decentralization; Green politics
- Political position: Centre-left to left-wing
- National affiliation: Chile Digno (2019–2022); Apruebo Dignidad (2021–2023); Unidad por Chile (2022–2025); VRH (2025–)
- Colors: Green; Blue; Red; Orange; Yellow
- Slogan: "Regionalize to develop" (Spanish: "Regionalizar para desarrollar")
- Chamber of Deputies: 2 / 155
- Senate: 3 / 50

Website
- frevs.cl

The Social Green Regionalist Federation (Spanish: Federación Regionalista Verde Social, FREVS) is a Chilean political party.

It was founded on January 14, 2017, after the union of the regionalist parties Regional and Popular Front (Spanish: Frente Regional y Popular), Green North Regional Force (Spanish: Fuerza Regional Norte Verde), Social Agrarian Regionalist Independent Movement (Spanish: Movimiento Independiente Regionalista Agrario y Social) and We Are Aysén (Spanish: Somos Aysén).

The Federation was created as a result of the new law of political parties that requires the constitution of the parties in at least three contiguous or eight discontinuous regions, and to be able to present candidacies to the parliamentary elections and of regional boards.

In 2017 they joined the Patagonian Regional Democracy party to form the Green Regionalist Coalition electoral pact.

The leaders of the parties that make up the federation and its home region are the following:

- Jaime Mulet, president of the Regional and Popular Front (Antofagasta and Atacama).
- Agapito Santander, president of the Green North Regional Force (Coquimbo).
- Alejandra Sepúlveda, president of the Social Agrarian Regionalist Independent Movement (O'Higgins).
- Jonathan Hechenleitner, president of We Are Aysén (Aysén).

== Presidential candidates ==
The following is a list of the presidential candidates supported by the Social Green Regionalist Federation. (Information gathered from the Archive of Chilean Elections).

- 2017: none
- 2021: Gabriel Boric (won)
- 2025: Jeannette Jara (lost)

== Elections results ==
=== Congress elections ===
Election year	Chamber of Deputies			Senate			Status
Election year	# Votes	% Votes	Seats	# Votes	% Votes	Seats	Status
2017	94,666	1.58%	4 / 155	2,397	0.14%	0 / 50	Opposition
2021	107,696	1.70%	2 / 155	188,308	4.04%	2 / 50	Coalition
2025	458,537	4.28%	2 / 155	80,295	2.59%	3 / 50	Opposition
