= Elections in Chile =

Elections in Chile are conducted at the national, regional, and municipal levels to choose the president, members of the National Congress, regional authorities, and local mayors and councilors.

Chile operates under a system of automatic voter registration. All Chilean citizens and foreign residents with at least five years of legal residency who are 18 years or older on election day are automatically enrolled. While voting was voluntary between 2012 and 2023, it has since been reinstated as compulsory.

The President of Chile, who serves as both head of state and head of government, is elected by popular vote to a four-year term and may run again after at least one term out of office. The country's bicameral Congress consists of a Chamber of Deputies and a Senate, elected through a system of proportional representation. A significant electoral reform in 2017 replaced the previous binomial voting system, creating new electoral districts and constituencies.

At the sub-national level, voters directly elect regional governors and councilors, as well as municipal mayors and councilors. The constitution also provides for binding national and local referendums. Chile employs a system of state-run, binding primary elections to select candidates for most elected offices.

The voting process is conducted by secret ballot in person, with voters required to present a valid national identity card or passport. The entire electoral process is administered by the independent Electoral Service (Servicio Electoral, or Servel), while official results are certified by the Election Certification Tribunal (Tricel).

== Electoral cycles ==
Position	2024–2025	2025–2026	2028–2029
President		Primary: June 29, 2025; Election: November 16, 2025; Runoff: December 14, 2025; Inaugurated: March 11, 2026	Primary: July 1, 2029; Election: November 18, 2029; Runoff: December 16, 2029; Inaugurated: March 11, 2030
Senate (half)		Primary: June 29, 2025; Election: November 16, 2025; Inaugurated: March 11, 2026	Primary: July 1, 2029; Election: November 18, 2029; Inaugurated: March 11, 2030
Chamber of Deputies		Primary: June 29, 2025; Election: November 16, 2025; Inaugurated: March 11, 2026	Primary: July 1, 2029; Election: November 18, 2029; Inaugurated: March 11, 2030
Regional Governors & Boards	Primary: June 9, 2024; Election: October 26–27, 2024; Runoff: November 24, 2024; Inaugurated: January 6, 2025		Primary: July 9, 2028; Election: October 29, 2028; Runoff: November 26, 2028; Inaugurated: January 6, 2029
Mayors & Councilors	Primary: June 9, 2024; Election: October 26–27, 2024; Inaugurated: December 6, 2024		Primary: July 9, 2028; Election: October 29, 2028; Inaugurated: December 6, 2028

== Electorate ==
The right to vote in Chile extends to all Chilean citizens aged 18 or older on election day. Foreign nationals who have been legal residents for a continuous period of at least five years are also eligible.

Chile operates a system of automatic voter registration, under which all eligible individuals are added to the electoral roll by default. Voting is compulsory for those registered, as it has been since 2023, following an eleven-year period (2012–2023) when voting was voluntary.

Since 2014, Chilean citizens living abroad have been able to vote in presidential elections (including primaries) and national referendums from their country of residence.

== Presidential elections ==
The President of Chile is both the head of state and head of government and is directly elected to a single, non-renewable four-year term. A former president may run for office again after sitting out at least one term.

The election is conducted by popular vote under a runoff system. To win outright in the first round, a candidate must secure an absolute majority of valid votes (calculated by excluding spoiled and blank ballots). If no candidate achieves this, a second round is held between the top two finishers. This system replaced the previous practice—abandoned after the 1989 constitutional reforms—whereby Congress would choose the president from among the leading candidates if no one won an absolute majority.

Presidential candidates can be nominated by any registered political party. Independent candidates must qualify by gathering signatures from a number of voters equal to at least 0.5% of those who voted in the most recent election for the Chamber of Deputies. Based on the 2025 elections, for example, this requirement amounted to 35,361 signatures.

Under the constitution, the first round of the presidential election is held on the third Sunday of November in the year before the incumbent's term expires. A potential runoff follows on the fourth Sunday thereafter. The president-elect is inaugurated on the day the outgoing president's term concludes, which has been March 11 in every election since the return to democracy in 1990.

Prior to a 2011 electoral reform, the first round was scheduled 90 days before the end of the presidential term, moved to the following Sunday if that date fell on a weekday. Any runoff was held 30 days after the first round, also adjusted to a Sunday.

== Parliamentary elections ==
Chile's legislature, the National Congress, is a bicameral body composed of the Chamber of Deputies (the lower house) and the Senate (the upper house). The Chamber of Deputies has 155 members elected from 28 multi-member districts. The Senate has 50 members elected from 16 regional constituencies.

Each electoral district elects between three and eight deputies, while each regional constituency elects between two and five senators. Seats in both chambers are allocated using the D'Hondt method of proportional representation.

Terms for deputies last four years, with members eligible for two consecutive re-elections. Senators serve eight-year terms and may be re-elected for one subsequent consecutive term. Senate elections are staggered, with half of the seats contested every four years. Following the return to democracy in 1990, an initial transition period saw senators from odd-numbered regions serve four-year terms (1990–1994), while those from even-numbered regions and the Santiago Metropolitan Region served full eight-year terms (1990–1998). (Note: Chile's regions were numbered consecutively from north to south following the 1974 regionalization reform under the military government (e.g., I Región de Tarapacá, II Región de Antofagasta, etc.). These numerical designations were widely used in official documents and public discourse until the 2000s, when they gradually fell out of use in favor of the regions' names.)

Parliamentary elections are held concurrently with presidential elections, as stipulated by the constitution.

=== Candidacy and electoral alliances ===
Candidates can be nominated by registered political parties or by groups of independent citizens. Party-affiliated candidates must have been members of that party for at least two months prior to the election and must not have changed party affiliation within the previous nine months.

Independent candidates must not have been members of any political party during the year preceding the election. To qualify, they must collect signatures from a number of independent voters equivalent to at least 0.5% of the total votes cast in their respective district or constituency in the previous election.

Two or more parties may form an electoral alliance, known locally as a pact, to jointly nominate a single list of candidates in each district. Candidates on an alliance list do not need to be members of any of the pact's constituent parties but cannot belong to a party outside the pact. Both pacts and parties running independently may nominate up to one more candidate than the number of seats available in a given district.

=== Electoral system prior to 2017 ===
A major electoral reform in 2015 replaced the system used since the end of military rule. The old system, in use until the 2017 elections, was known as the binomial voting system.

It divided the country into 60 two-seat districts for the Chamber of Deputies (120 seats total) and 19 two-seat constituencies for the Senate (38 elected seats). Chile was unique in applying the D'Hondt method exclusively to two-seat constituencies nationwide.

Under this system, the two electoral lists (whether from a pact, a party, or independents) that received the most votes in a district would typically each win one seat. For one list to win both seats, it needed to at least double the vote total of the second-place list.

The 2015 reform redrew the electoral map, creating fewer, larger districts and aligning senatorial constituencies with the country's regions. This new, more proportional system was first used in the 2017 general elections and significantly altered the composition of Congress.

After the 2015 electoral reform, Chileans elect the members of both houses of Congress through a form of open list proportional representation in multi-member districts (which can range from 3 to 8 seats in the lower house and from 2 to 5 in the upper house). Parties or party coalitions present lists to voters in each electoral district. Each voter casts one vote for a candidate on any list. Once voting concludes, seats in each district are allocated through the D'Hondt method, ordering lists from highest to lowest according to total votes and ordering candidates within each list by the same principle. Seats are allocated in order of preference but not necessarily proportionally.

==== Criticism ====
The binomial system was introduced by the military dictatorship that ruled Chile until 1990. It replaced the proportional representation system used before the 1973 coup. The design of the two-seat districts—often drawn to over-represent conservative rural areas that had supported the Pinochet regime—was a frequent target of criticism. The disparity between votes and seats was particularly pronounced in districts where the regime had performed poorly in the 1988 plebiscite.

Amending the system was difficult, as it was protected by constitutional provisions requiring a three-fifths supermajority in both houses of Congress.

Critics, primarily from the center-left Concert of Parties for Democracy, argued the system distorted representation by preventing clear legislative majorities and artificially boosting the power of right-wing parties. The left often condemned it as undemocratic, arguing it effectively excluded parties and candidates outside the two dominant coalitions.

Supporters, mainly on the political right, defended the system as a source of political stability and argued that it encouraged the formation of broad, cohesive coalitions.

== Regional elections ==
Each of Chile's regions is governed by a directly elected regional governor (Gobernador Regional), who is supported by an elected board of regional councilors (Consejeros Regionales, or COREs).

The regional governor is elected via a two-round system to a four-year term and is eligible for one immediate re-election. A candidate can avoid a runoff by winning at least 40 percent of the vote in the first round. Regional councilors also serve four-year terms and may be re-elected for up to two consecutive terms. The number of councilors per region is determined by a formula based on the region's population and geographic area.

The first direct election for regional governor was held in May 2021. Previously, this position was held by an intendant (Intendente) appointed directly by the president. Regional councilors were first directly elected in November 2013.

=== Electoral reform ===
The move toward direct election of regional officials was implemented in stages:

- Regional councilors: A 2009 constitutional amendment established the principle of directly elected regional councilors. The process was formally regulated by a law passed in June 2013.
- Regional governors: A 2017 constitutional amendment allowed for the direct election of regional governors, with specific regulations enacted into law in February 2018.

==== Previous system for regional councilors ====
Prior to the 2013 reform, regional councilors were not directly elected by the public. Instead, they were chosen by an electoral college composed of municipal council members from within each region.

Under that system:

- Each province in a region was allocated two councilors.
- Additional councilors (10 for regions with up to one million inhabitants, or 14 for larger regions) were distributed among the provinces based on population, using the D'Hondt method.
- In each province, the candidate with the most votes won a seat. If multiple candidates ran as part of a list, the D'Hondt method was used to allocate seats among the competing lists.
- Councilors served four-year terms with no term limits. They were elected 15 days after municipal councilors took office and were sworn in 60 days after their election.

==== Transition to direct elections ====
A temporary constitutional article in December 2012 canceled the scheduled indirect election for that year and extended the term of the sitting councilors until March 2014. It also stipulated that the first direct election for councilors would be held on November 17, 2013, concurrent with the presidential and parliamentary elections, provided the implementing legislation was published by July 20, 2013.

The law governing the election of regional governors specified that future elections would be synchronized with those for mayors and municipal councilors. However, full synchronization was not immediate; while the first gubernatorial election was held in 2021, the first synchronized election for all local and regional offices (governors, mayors, councilors, and regional councilors) took place in October 2024.

== Municipal elections ==
In each of Chile's municipalities (comunas), voters directly elect one mayor (alcalde) and a municipal council (concejo municipal).

- Mayors are elected by a plurality (simple majority) to a four-year term and face no term limits.
- Councilors are elected through a proportional representation system, similar to the D'Hondt method. The number of councilors per municipality ranges from six to ten, based on the commune's registered voter population.

Since a 2004 reform, mayors and councilors have been elected on separate ballots, allowing for split-ticket voting.

Municipal elections are held on the last Sunday of October. Newly elected officials take office on December 6.

=== Update on election cycles ===
The 2016 municipal election was held on October 23, moved forward from October 30 to avoid a conflict with a national holiday.

Subsequent elections were held in 2021. The most recent election took place in October 2024, synchronized for the first time with elections for regional governors.

== Referendums ==
=== National referendums ===
The Constitution provides for binding national referendums (plebiscitos), but only under a specific condition. This mechanism is triggered when a constitutional reform passed by Congress is fully vetoed by the president, and Congress then re-approves the identical reform by a two-thirds majority in both chambers. Faced with this scenario, the president has the option to either promulgate the reform or call a referendum to let the electorate decide. This presidential power has never been used.

=== Communal referendums ===
Municipalities have the constitutional authority to hold binding local referendums on matters of communal importance. A referendum can be called through one of three channels:

- The mayor, with the approval of the municipal council.
- A two-thirds majority vote of the council members.
- A citizen initiative requiring signatures from voters equivalent to 10% of the total turnout in the commune's most recent municipal election.

The first and, to date, only binding communal referendum was held in the municipality of Peñalolén on December 11, 2011, to decide on a new zoning plan for the commune.

== Primary elections ==
Chile employs a system of state-administered, legally binding primary elections to select candidates for president, senator, deputy, and mayor. Presidential and congressional primaries are held on the same day.

Primaries can be conducted by a single political party or by a coalition of parties, known as a "pact." Independent candidates may participate if they are formally backed by a participating party or pact. However, an independent cannot run in a congressional primary if their supporting party is not part of a pact. Parties are permitted to form different pacts for presidential and parliamentary primaries.

The rules for voter eligibility in a primary are set by the organizing party or pact. They may choose to open their primary to unaffiliated voters or even to voters registered with other parties. The exception is a presidential primary that includes an independent candidate; in that case, independent voters must be allowed to participate.

The results of these primaries are constitutionally binding. A candidate who loses is prohibited from running for the same office in the subsequent general election, unless the winning candidate dies or formally withdraws before the candidate registration deadline.

By law, primaries are held on the twentieth Sunday before the general election. The first state-run primaries for president and deputy were held on June 30, 2013, followed by the first mayoral primaries on June 19, 2016.

=== Historical (extralegal) primaries ===
Prior to the establishment of the legal primary system, political coalitions organized their own informal primary processes.

- Presidential: The center-left Concertación coalition used primaries to select its presidential candidate in 1993, 1999, and 2009 (a planned primary for 2005 was canceled when one of the two contenders dropped out). The left-wing Juntos Podemos pact also held a presidential primary in 2009.
- Parliamentary: In the lead-up to the 2013 general election, Concertación parties held informal primaries to select some of their congressional candidates.
- Mayoral: For the 2012 municipal elections, the Concertación organized primaries on April 1, 2012, in over 40% of the country's communes to choose its mayoral candidates.

== Voting ==
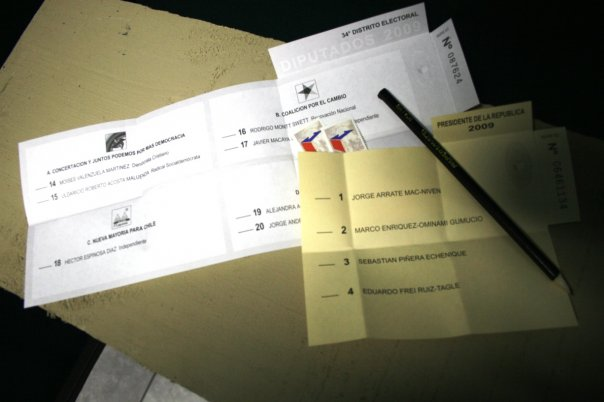
Ballots used in the 2009 parliamentary and presidential elections

To vote, Chilean citizens must present a valid form of identification—either a national identity card (issued within the last year) or a current passport. Foreign residents eligible to vote must present their identity card. The process is conducted in person by secret ballot.

The voting procedure is as follows:

1. Voters present their ID to officials at the polling station to verify their registration.
2. After verification, the voter signs the electoral register.
3. The voter receives one or more ballots listing all candidates, their assigned numbers, and party affiliations.
4. Inside a private voting booth, the voter marks their choice by drawing a vertical line over the horizontal line printed next to their preferred candidate, using a blue pen (voters are encouraged to bring their own, but pens are available at polling stations).
5. Marking more than one candidate on a ballot invalidates it (a null vote), while a ballot with no marks is considered "blank."
6. The voter returns the folded ballot(s) to a polling officer, who removes a detachable serial number.
7. The voter then deposits the ballot into the corresponding ballot box.
8. The voter's ID is returned.

Polling places are typically located in public buildings such as schools or sports centers. Security is provided by the armed forces and Carabineros (uniformed police), who are present before, during, and after voting to ensure order. Since a 2012 reform, voter enrollment rolls are no longer segregated by sex, allowing men and women to vote together in the same polling stations.

== Suffrage ==
The history of suffrage in Chile since 1833 reflects a gradual expansion of voting rights:

- From 1833: Suffrage was restricted to literate men over the age of 25 (if unmarried) or 21 (if married) who also owned a certain amount of property or capital as defined by law (Article 8 of the 1833 Constitution).
  - The 1884 Election Law removed the property requirement for men but explicitly barred women from voter registration.
- From 1925: The franchise was extended to all literate men over the age of 21 (Article 7 of the 1925 Constitution).
  - From 1934: Women gained the right to vote in a limited form. Literate women over 25 could vote in municipal elections, while men over 21 could vote in all elections (Law No. 5,357).
  - From 1949: Full universal suffrage was achieved, with the right to vote extended to all literate men and women over 21 (Law No. 9,292).
- From 1970: The voting age was lowered to 18 and the literacy requirement was abolished for all citizens (Law No. 17,284, amending the 1925 Constitution; later retained in Article 13 of the 1980 Constitution).

=== Women's suffrage ===
No Chilean constitution has explicitly prohibited women from voting. The constitutional term chilenos (meaning "Chileans") was interpreted as gender-neutral in its plural form, referring to the Chilean people as a whole. Therefore, extending the vote to women was accomplished through statutory law rather than a constitutional amendment.

Despite these legal expansions, the electorate remained limited in practice. As late as the 1950s, largely due to literacy requirements, only about 20 percent of the Chilean population was eligible to vote.

== Voter turnout ==
Election turnout since 1925.

Note: Since 2017, enrollment and turnout figures for presidential elections, presidential primaries, and plebiscites include voters from abroad.

Date	Election	VAP^{1}	Registered^{2}	%	Turnout^{3}	%	T / VAP %^{4}
1925-10-24	President	—N/a	302,142	—N/a	—N/a	86.4	—N/a
1927-05-22	President	—N/a	328,700	—N/a	—N/a	70.4	—N/a
1931-10-04	President	—N/a	388,959	—N/a	—N/a	73.5	—N/a
1932-10-30	President	—N/a	464,879	—N/a	—N/a	74.0	—N/a
1938-10-25	President	—N/a	503,871	—N/a	—N/a	88.1	—N/a
1942-02-02	President	—N/a	581,486	—N/a	—N/a	80.2	—N/a
1946-09-04	President	—N/a	631,257	—N/a	—N/a	75.9	—N/a
1952-09-04	President	3,290,043	1,105,029	33.59	—N/a	86.6	29.1
1953-03-01	Legislative	3,319,987	1,106,709	33.33	—N/a	68.6	22.9
1957-03-03	Legislative	3,560,495	1,284,159	36.07	—N/a	70.5	25.4
1958-09-04	President	3,649,924	1,497,902	41.04	—N/a	83.5	34.3
1961-03-12	Legislative	3,815,496	1,858,980	48.72	—N/a	74.5	36.3
1964-09-04	President	4,098,612	2,915,121	71.12	—N/a	86.8	61.7
1965-03-14	Legislative	4,145,932	2,920,615	70.45	—N/a	80.6	56.8
1969-03-16	Legislative	4,518,768	3,244,892	71.81	—N/a	74.2	53.3
1970-09-04	President	5,200,790	3,539,747	68.06	2,954,799	83.47	56.81
1971-04-01	Municipal	—N/a	3,792,682	—N/a	2,835,412	—N/a	—N/a
1973-03-11	Legislative	5,514,216	4,509,559	81.78	3,687,105	81.8	66.9
1988-10-05	Plebiscite	8,193,683	7,435,913	90.75	7,251,933	97.53	88.51
1989-07-30	Plebiscite	8,344,555	7,556,613	90.56	7,082,084	93.72	84.87
1989-12-14	Chamber of Deputies	8,414,203	7,557,537	89.82	7,158,646	94.72	85.08
1989-12-14	Senate	8,414,203	7,557,537	89.82	7,158,442	94.72	85.08
1989-12-14	President	8,414,203	7,557,537	89.82	7,158,727	94.72	85.08
1992-06-28	Municipal	8,902,989	7,840,008	88.06	7,043,827	89.84	79.12
1993-12-11	Chamber of Deputies	9,172,608	8,085,439	88.15	7,385,016	91.34	80.51
1993-12-11	Senate	—N/a	—N/a	—N/a	2,045,681	—N/a	—N/a
1993-12-11	President	9,172,608	8,085,439	88.15	7,387,709	91.37	80.54
1996-10-27	Municipal	9,670,815	8,073,368	83.48	7,079,418	87.69	73.20
1997-12-14	Chamber of Deputies	9,868,810	8,069,624	81.77	7,046,351	87.32	71.40
1997-12-14	Senate	—N/a	—N/a	—N/a	5,102,906	—N/a	—N/a
1999-12-12	President	10,237,392	8,084,476	78.97	7,271,584	89.95	71.03
2000-01-16	President – Runoff	10,237,392	8,084,476	78.97	7,326,753	90.63	71.57
2000-10-29	Municipal	10,409,834	8,089,363	77.71	7,089,886	87.64	68.11
2001-12-16	Chamber of Deputies	10,640,846	8,075,446	75.89	7,034,292	87.11	66.11
2001-12-16	Senate	—N/a	—N/a	—N/a	1,975,017	—N/a	—N/a
2004-10-31	Councilors	11,233,815	8,012,065	71.32	6,874,315	85.80	61.19
2004-10-31	Mayors	11,233,815	8,012,065	71.32	6,872,675	85.78	61.18
2005-12-11	Chamber of Deputies	11,471,909	8,220,897	71.66	7,207,351	87.67	62.83
2005-12-11	Senate	—N/a	5,863,704	—N/a	5,182,224	88.38	—N/a
2005-12-11	President	11,471,909	8,220,897	71.66	7,207,278	87.67	62.83
2006-01-15	President – Runoff	11,471,909	8,220,897	71.66	7,162,345	87.12	62.43
2008-10-26	Councilors	12,095,757	8,110,265	67.05	6,950,508	85.70	57.46
2008-10-26	Mayors	12,095,757	8,110,265	67.05	6,959,075	85.81	57.53
2009-12-13	Chamber of Deputies	12,345,729	8,285,186	67.11	7,263,537	87.67	58.83
2009-12-13	Senate	—N/a	2,392,477	—N/a	2,053,480	85.83	—N/a
2009-12-13	President	12,345,729	8,285,186	67.11	7,264,136	87.68	58.84
2010-01-17	President – Runoff	12,345,729	8,285,186	67.11	7,203,371	86.94	58.35
2012-10-28	Councilors	12,953,120	13,404,084	103.48	5,770,423	43.05	44.55
2012-10-28	Mayors	12,953,120	13,404,084	103.48	5,790,617	43.20	44.70
2013-06-30	Presidential primaries	13,087,161	13,307,182^{a}	101.68	3,010,890	22.63	23.01
2013-06-30	Lower-chamber primaries^{b}	—N/a	—N/a	—N/a	300,839	—N/a	—N/a
2013-11-17	Regional boards	13,160,122	13,573,143	103.14	6,685,333	49.25	50.80
2013-11-17	Chamber of Deputies	13,160,122	13,573,143	103.14	6,698,524	49.35	50.90
2013-11-17	Senate	—N/a	9,770,063	—N/a	4,852,165	49.66	—N/a
2013-11-17	President	13,160,122	13,573,143	103.14	6,699,011	49.35	50.90
2013-12-15	President – Runoff	13,160,122	13,573,143	103.14	5,697,751	41.98	43.30
2016-06-19	Mayoral primaries^{c}	5,154,006	5,067,812^{d}	98.33	280,481	5.53	5.44
2016-10-23	Councilors	13,678,149	14,121,316	103.24	4,915,436	34.81	35.94
2016-10-23	Mayors	13,678,149	14,121,316	103.24	4,926,935	34.89	36.02
2017-07-02	Presidential primaries	13,790,520	13,531,553^{h}	98.12	1,813,688	13.40	13.15
2017-07-02	Lower-chamber primaries^{j}	—N/a	3,541,669^{k}	—N/a	418,336	11.81	—N/a
2017-11-19	Regional boards	14,009,047	14,347,288	102.41	6,674,828	46.52	47.65
2017-11-19	Chamber of Deputies	14,009,047	14,347,288	102.41	6,673,831	46.52	47.64
2017-11-19	Senate	—N/a	3,992,804	—N/a	1,819,045	45.56	—N/a
2017-11-19	President	14,009,047	14,347,288	102.41	6,703,327	46.72	47.85
2017-12-17	President – Runoff	14,022,729	14,347,288	102.41	7,032,878	49.02	50.15
2020-10-25	Plebiscite (new constitution)	15,052,382	14,855,719	98.69	7,573,914	50.98	50.32
2020-10-25	Plebiscite (drafting body)	15,052,382	14,855,719	98.69	7,573,124	50.98	50.31
2020-11-29	Gubernatorial primaries	15,073,334	14,470,550	96.00	418,685^{o}	2.89	2.78
2020-11-29	Mayoral primaries^{n}	—N/a	3,379,521	—N/a	147,608^{p}	4.37	—N/a
2021-05-16	Convention Constituents	15,173,902	14,900,190	98.20	6,473,057	43.44	42.66
2021-05-16	Regional governors	15,173,902	14,900,190	98.20	6,472,470	43.44	42.66
2021-05-16	Mayors	15,173,902	14,900,190	98.20	6,471,476^{m}	43.43	42.65
2021-05-16	Councilors	15,173,902	14,900,190	98.20	6,460,836^{m}	43.36	42.58
2021-06-13	Regional governors (runoff)^{q}	—N/a	13,040,819	—N/a	2,558,962^{r}	19.62	—N/a
2021-07-18	Presidential primaries	—N/a	14,693,433	—N/a	3,141,404	21.38	—N/a
Date	Election	VAP^{1}	Registered^{2}	%	Turnout^{3}	%	T / VAP %^{4}

Notes: ^{a} Excludes 200,638 affiliates from non-participating political parties. ^{b} Held in 10 out of 60 electoral districts. ^{c} Held in 93 out of 346 communes. ^{d} Excludes affiliates from non-participating political parties. ^{h} Excludes 273,017 affiliates and 445,722 'pending' affiliates from non-participating political parties, and 21,270 electors from abroad. ^{j} Held in 7 out of 28 electoral districts. ^{k} Excludes affiliates and 'pending' affiliates from non-participating political parties. ^{m} Revised provisional results. ^{n} Held in 36 out of 346 communes. ^{o} Provisional results including 99.91% of ballot boxes. ^{p} Provisional results including 99.84% of ballot boxes. ^{q} Held in 13 out of 16 regions. ^{r} Provisional results including 99.99% of ballot boxes.

- Voting Age Population: An estimation of the country's population over the age of 21 (1952–1969) and 18 (1970–2013) on the day of the election. Source: "Annual Population by Age - Both Sexes". World Population Prospects, the 2012 Revision. United Nations Department of Economic and Social Affairs, Population Division, Population Estimates and Projections Section. June 13, 2013. Note: The UN provides data estimated for July 1 of each year disaggregated by age. Linear interpolation was applied to obtain the population for election day. For 2016 mayoral primaries and November 19, 2017, elections: COMUNAS: ACTUALIZACIÓN POBLACIÓN 2002-2012 Y PROYECCIONES 2013-2020, National Statistics Institute of Chile. For 2020 elections: Estimaciones y proyecciones 1992-2050, país, National Statistics Institute of Chile. Note: VAP is for June 30.
- Source: Electoral Service (1925–1973; 1988–2010; 2012; 2013; 2016 (primaries); 2016 (municipal); 2017 (presidential primaries); 2017 (lower-chamber primaries and November 19, 2017, elections); 2021 (regional governors)).
- Source: Electoral Service (1925–1969 and 1973 as a percentage only; 1970; 1988–2012; 2013 (primaries); 2013 (regional boards); 2013 (deputies); 2013 (Senate); 2013 (president); 2016 (primaries); 2016 (municipal); 2017). Values for 1952–1969 and 1973 derived from columns 3, 4 and 7.
- Turnout as a percentage of the voting age population.

== See also ==
- Electoral calendar
- Electoral system
