= Democratic Revolution =

Political party in Chile

Democratic Revolution Revolución Democrática
- President: Juan Ignacio Latorre
- Secretary-General: Sebastián Depolo
- Founded: 7 January 2012; 14 years ago
- Registered: 22 June 2016
- Dissolved: 1 July 2024
- Merged into: Broad Front
- Headquarters: Avenida Francisco Bilbao 299, Providencia, Santiago, Chile
- Ideology: Participatory democracy Democratic socialism Social democracy Anti-capitalism
- Political position: Left-wing
- National affiliation: Broad Front; Apruebo Dignidad

Democratic Revolution (Spanish: Revolución Democrática) was a Chilean left-wing political party, founded in 2012 by some of the leaders of the 2011 Chilean student protests, most notably the current Deputy Giorgio Jackson, who is also the most popular public figure of the party. Their principles were based on advocating for participative democracy and the overcoming of neoliberalism in Chile.

== History ==
The movement was founded on January 7, 2012, adding up to more than 4000 supporters in the first week.

They presented three candidates for the 2013 Chilean parliamentary election, winning one seat in the Chamber of Deputies, the former student leader Giorgio Jackson. They did not support any of the presidential candidates, although the majority of the movement decided to request the vote for Michelle Bachelet in the second round of the election. The same year, the movement elected their first Executive Committee, led by Miguel Crispi and Sebastián Depolo.

In mid-2015, the members of the movement decided to start the process to become a party. After collecting signatures all over the country, they were accepted as an official party in 2016. Being an official party, they presented candidates for the Municipal election of 2016, most notably candidates for mayor in Antofagasta, La Serena, Taltal, among other towns, electing 9 members of Municipal Councils.

Since 2018, the party has 7 deputies in the Chilean parliament and a senator.

In June 2023 prosecutors began an investigation on various party members and a non-governmental organization linked to the party to clarify whether there has been influence peddling, conflict of interest, embezzlement and misuse of funds in the Democracia Viva case. Democratic Revolution deputy Catalina Pérez, who have been implicated in the case, declared to put her membership in the party "on-hold".

== Ideology ==
The party was described as leftist as well as Centre-left. In its Ideological Definitions, adopted in October 2015, the party described itself as anti-capitalist.

== Presidential candidates ==
The following is a list of the presidential candidates supported by Democratic Revolution.

- 2017: Beatriz Sánchez (lost)
- 2021: Gabriel Boric (won)
