= Chamber of Deputies of Chile =

National legislature of Chile

Chamber of Deputies of Chile Cámara de Diputadas y Diputados
- 57th legislative period
- Coat of arms of Chile

Type
- Type: Lower House of the National Congress of Chile

History
- Founded: 4 July 1811 (First National Congress)

Leadership
- President: Jorge Alessandri Vergara, UDI since 11 March 2026

Structure
- Seats: 155
- Political groups: Government (67): Republican (30); UDI (19); RN (16) (Note: RN (13); Evópoli (2); Democrats (1)); Independents (2); Supported by (8): PNL (8); Independents (15): PDG (15); Opposition (65): Broad Front (18); Socialist (15) (Note: Socialist (11); Liberal (3); Radical (1)); Communist (12); PPD (10); PDC (10) (Note: PDC (8); FREVS (2))
- Length of term: Four years

Elections
- Last election: 16 November 2025
- Next election: By 2029

Meeting place
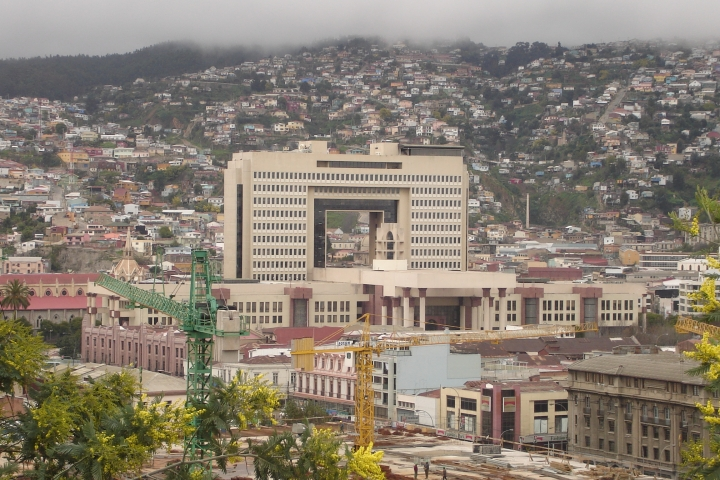
- Edificio del Congreso Nacional; Valparaíso, Chile

Website
- Cámara de Diputadas / Senado

The Chamber of Deputies (Spanish: Cámara de Diputadas y Diputados) (Note: In Spanish, the Chamber's name includes both 'Diputadas' (female Deputies) and 'Diputados' (male Deputies), which in English is just translated to the gender-neutral 'Deputies'.) is the lower house of Chile's bicameral Congress. Its organisation and its powers and duties are defined in articles 42 to 59 of Chile's current constitution.

== Eligibility ==
Deputies must: be aged at least 21; not be disqualified from voting; have finished secondary school or its equivalent; and have lived in the corresponding electoral district for at least two years prior to the election.

== Electoral system ==
Since 2017, Chile's congress has been elected through open list proportional representation under the D'Hondt method.

Before 2017, a unique binomial system was used. These system rewards coalition slates. Each coalition could run two candidates for each electoral district's two Chamber seats. Typically, the two largest coalitions in a district divided the seats, one each, among themselves. Only if the leading coalition ticket out-polls the second-place coalition by a margin of more than two-to-one did the winning coalition gain both seats. with seats allocated using the simple quotient. The Chamber of Deputies meets in Chile's National Congress located in the port city of Valparaíso, some 120 km north of the capital, Santiago. The Congress building in Valparaíso replaced the old National Congress, located in downtown Santiago, in 1990.

== President of the Chamber ==
On 11 March 2022, it was agreed that the Presidency of the Chilean Chamber of Deputies would rotate between the Party for Democracy (PPD), Communist Party (PC), Christian Democratic Party (DC), Party of the People (PDG), the Broad Front (FA) and the Liberal Party (PL). Likewise, the first and second vice-presidencies were assigned to people who are members of the PR, FA, PS, PC, DC and PPD.

== Political composition (2026-2030) ==
Current party representation in the Chamber of Deputies
Parliamentary Group (Note: Party name and leaders current as of 8 July 2024) (Note: Parliamentary Group: internal organisation of the congress; does not necessarily represent membership of political parties)	Leader	Seats (Note: Seat numbers current as of 4 January 2026)	Political position	Ideology
Republican Party	Benjamín Moreno; Cristián Araya; José Carlos Meza; Luis Fernando Sánchez	31	Right-wing	National conservatism, Gremialismo
Independent Democratic Union	Flor Weisse; Marco Antonio Sulantay	18	Centre-right to Right-wing	Gremialismo, Conservatism, Economic liberalism
Broad Front	Lorena Fries	18	Left-wing	Democratic socialism, Progressivism
National Renewal, Evópoli and Independents	Diego Schalper	16	Centre-right to right-wing	Conservatism, Liberal conservatism, Liberalism
Socialist, Liberal and Independents	Raúl Leiva	15	Centre-left to Left-wing	Social democracy, Democratic socialism, Social Liberalism
Party of the People	Juan Marcelo Valenzuela; Tamara Ramírez	15	Big tent	Populism, Anti-establishment
Communist and Independents	Lorena Pizarro	12	Left-wing to far-left	Communism
Christian Democratic, Social Green Regionalist Federation and Independents	Jorge Díaz	10	Centre-left	Christian democracy, Third Way, Green politics
Party for Democracy and Independents	Raúl Soto	10	Centre-left	Social democracy, Social liberalism
National Libertarian Party	Cristóbal Urruticoechea	8	Far-right	Right-libertarianism, Right-wing antiglobalism
Independents without a parliamentary group		2		
Total		155		

== See also ==
- List of legislatures by country
- List of presidents of the Chamber of Deputies of Chile
- National Congress of Chile
- Senate of Chile
