= Alfredo Azancot =

Portuguese-Chilean architect

Alfredo Azancot (1 February 1872 – 1937) was a Portuguese architect, born on São Tomé Island and educated at the École des ponts ParisTech. He emigrated to Chile, and designed many buildings in Viña del Mar, including Brunet Castle, Rioja Palace and the Carrasco Palace. He also designed the British Arch in Valparaíso.

== Gallery ==
Buildings designed by Alfredo Azancot
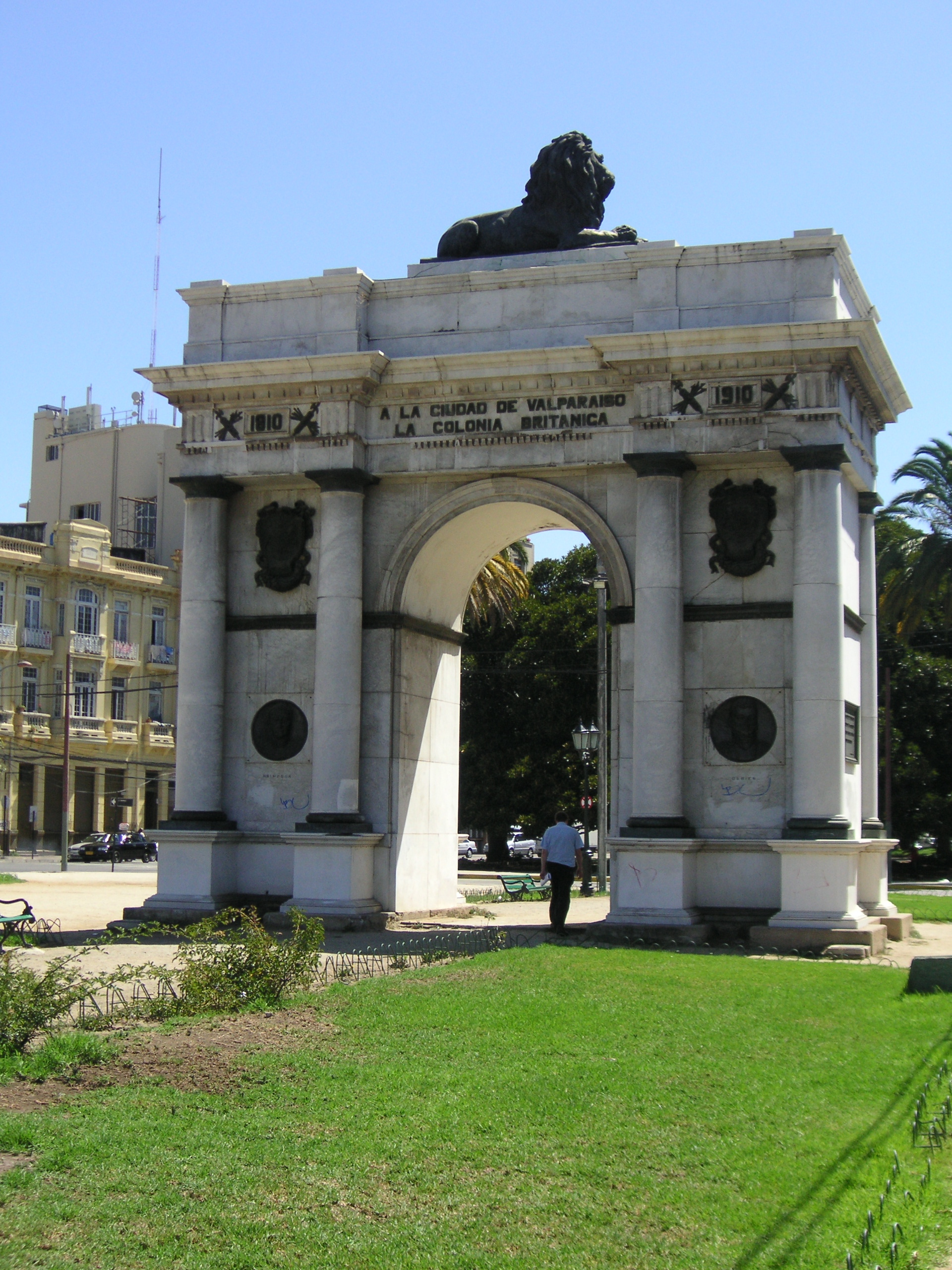
British Arch in Valparaíso

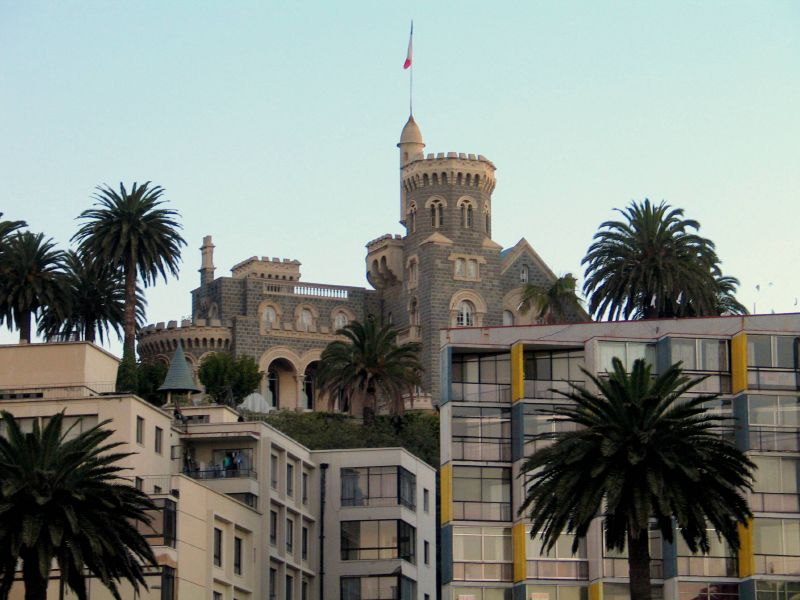
Brunet Castle in Viña del Mar

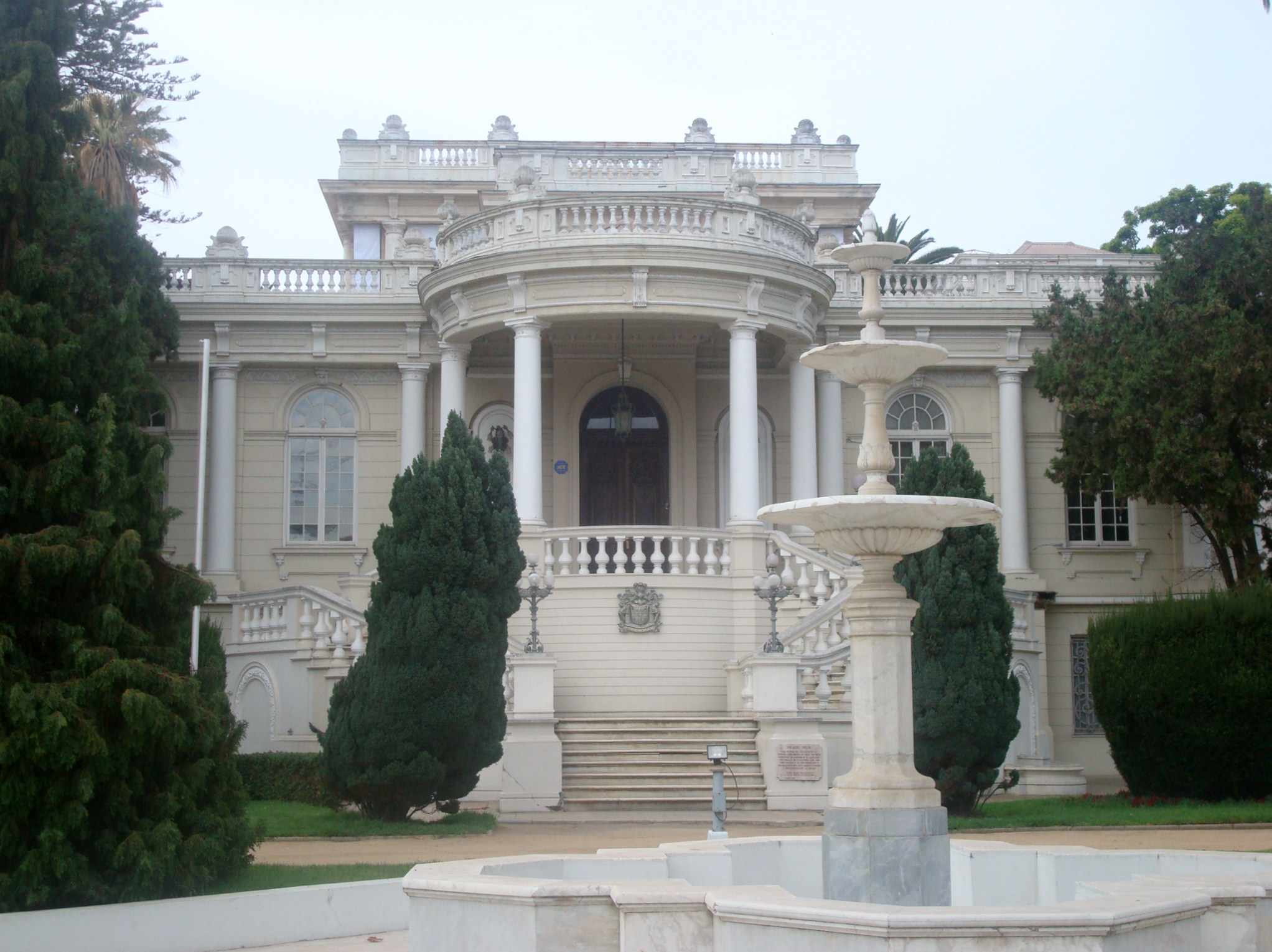
Rioja Palace in Viña del Mar

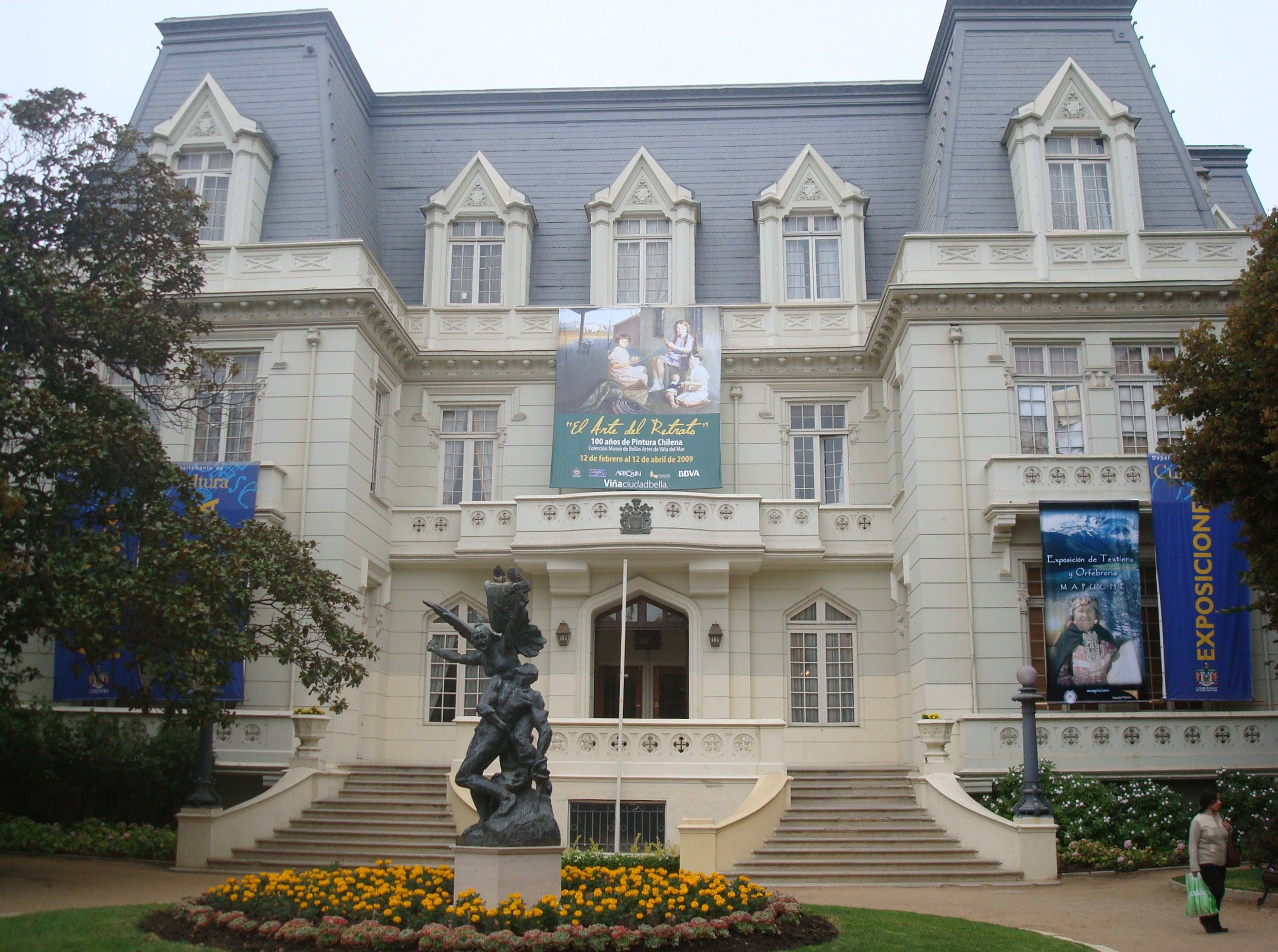
Carrasco Palace in Viña del Mar
