= Tamara Jacquin =

Tamara Jacquin (Viña del Mar, Chile, 1986) is a Chilean sculptor and performance artist based in Madrid.

== Biography ==
She studied architecture in Chile and France. Her work has been exhibited mainly in Spain although it has also been seen in other places.

Her works are based on a personal experience, on the sensations that her body perceives, among them the weight, the load that the body bears and that metaphorically are all the burdens that women have, and the demands of society.

Her artwork delves into the way women build their bodies and their identities, which is reflected in wooden objects that are heavy and hinder women's movements.

She has received several awards such as the Sculpture Network Award from the Sculpture Network Association, based in Munich. The association aims to promote sculpture in Europe and to establish connections between artists, mediators, organizers, suppliers and collectors.
