= Brunet Castle =

Castle in Viña del Mar, Chile

- Castillo Brunet
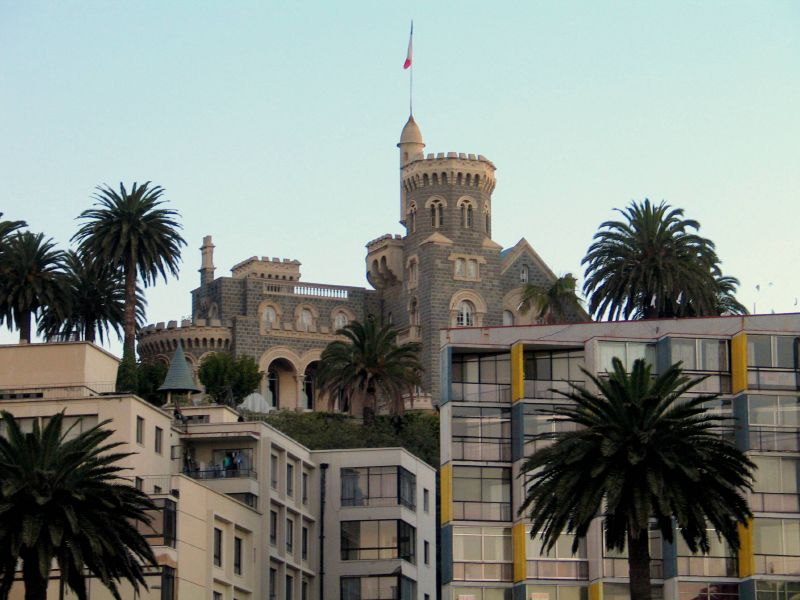
- Interactive map of the Brunet Castle area

General information
- Type: Castle
- Location: Viña del Mar, Chile
- Coordinates: 33°01′18″S 71°33′43″W

Design and construction
- Architect: Alfredo Azancot

The Brunet Castle (Spanish: Castillo Brunet), also known as Yarur Palace (Spanish: Palacio Yarur), is a historic castle in Viña del Mar, Chile.

== History ==
The Brunet Castle was built for the Brunet family to the architectural design of Alfredo Azancot, with Jorge Schroeder Espinoza was project architect.

The castle was purchased by Nicolas Yarur in 1940. Shortly after, he hired Schroeder to remodel the castle. In 1945, it was used as a summer residence by the Chilean Ministry of Foreign Affairs.

It has been listed since 9 May 2000 as "historic and/or architectural building" by the city council.
