= British Arch =

- Arco Británico (Spanish)
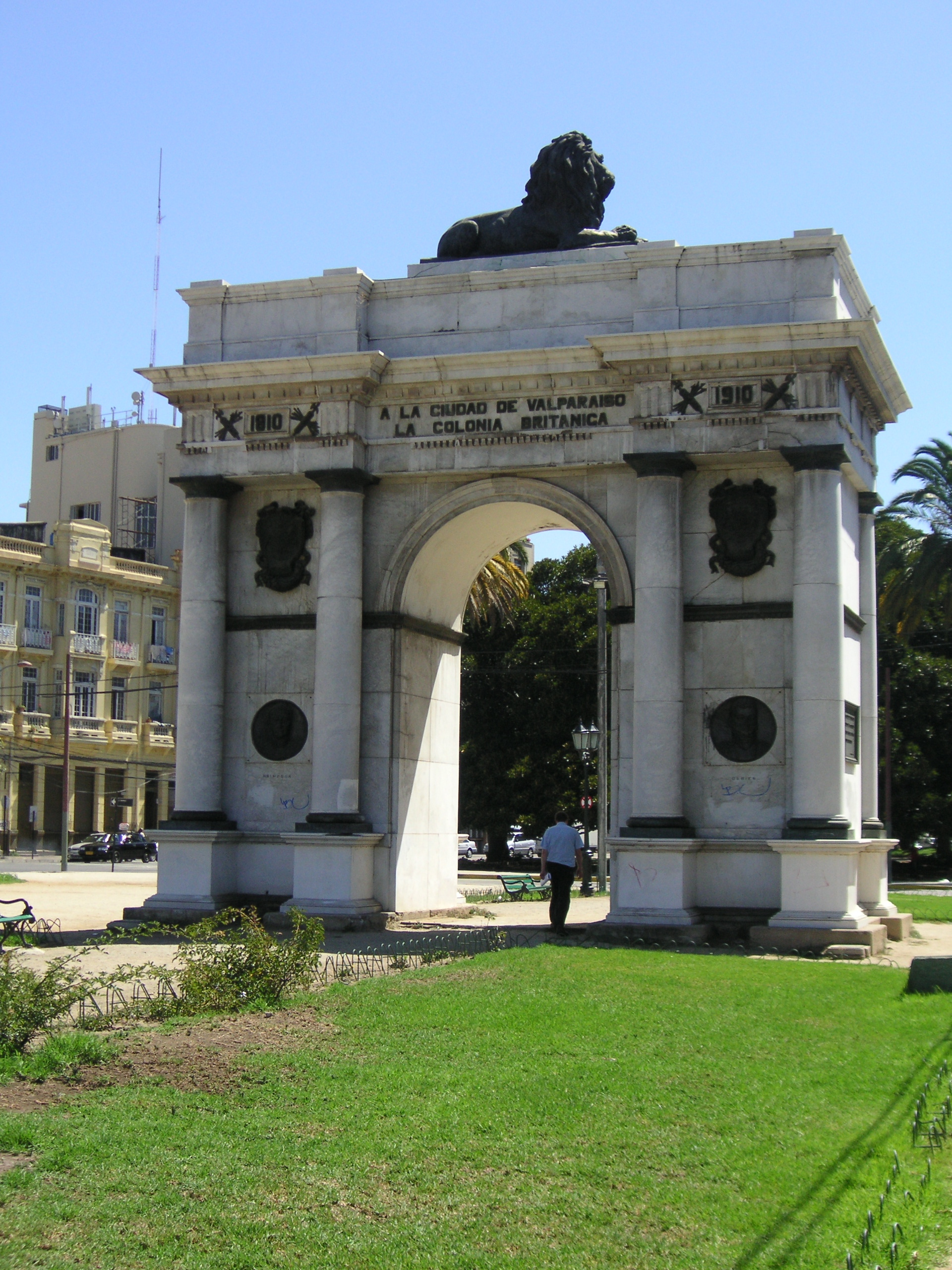
- Location in Valparaíso
- Location: Valparaíso, Chile
- Coordinates: 33.04464°S 71.62046°W
- Designer: Alfredo Azancot
- Type: Triumphal arch
- Material: Marble
- Opening date: 1911
- Dedicated to: The City of Valparaíso

The British Arch (Spanish: Arco Británico) is a monument on Brazil Avenue in Valparaíso, Chile. It was donated to the town in 1910 by the British community there to mark the centenary of the Independence of Chile. Designed by the Chilean architect Alfredo Azancot, the arch was unveiled in 1911.

The monument, covered in marble brought from Italy, is surmounted by a British Victorian lion and is decorated with the images of four Britons who participated in the Chilean War of Independence: Thomas Cochrane, Bernardo O'Higgins, Robert Simpson and Jorge O'Brien. It also bears the Chilean and United Kingdom coats of arms.

The arch was visited by Queen Elizabeth II during her official visit to Chile in 1968, and by Prince Charles in 2009.
