= Estero Marga Marga =

Watercourse in Chile

Coordinates: 33°01′11″S 71°33′44″W

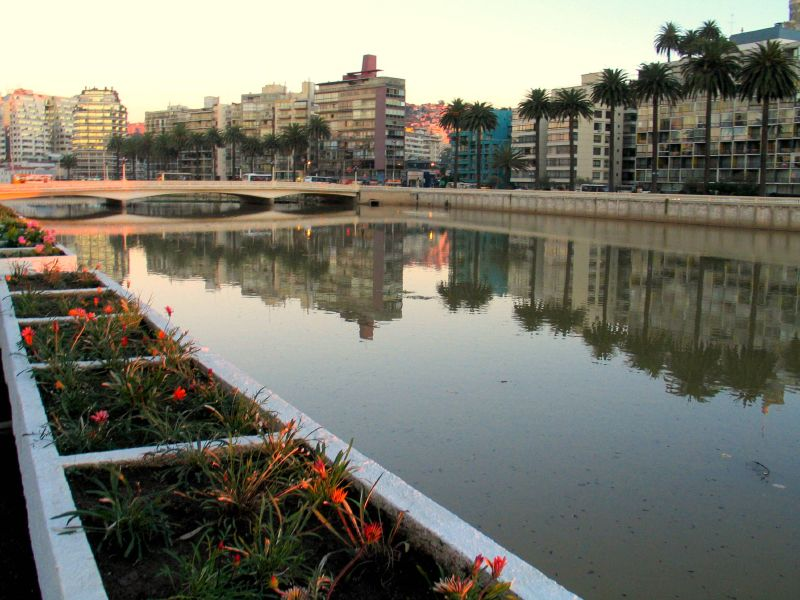
Image of Marga Marga

Estero Marga Marga is small natural watercourse in Valparaíso Region, Chile. Estero Marga Marga is known for being an important site of Spanish gold mining in the 16th century. The invasive plant species Limnobium laevigatum is present in the watercourse.

Estero Marga Marga is underlain by a blind fault.

As of 2025 the municipality of Viña del Mar had plans to turn its lower course into a floodable park with wetlands and terraces for walk.
