= Viña del Mar =

City in Valparaíso, Chile

- City and commune
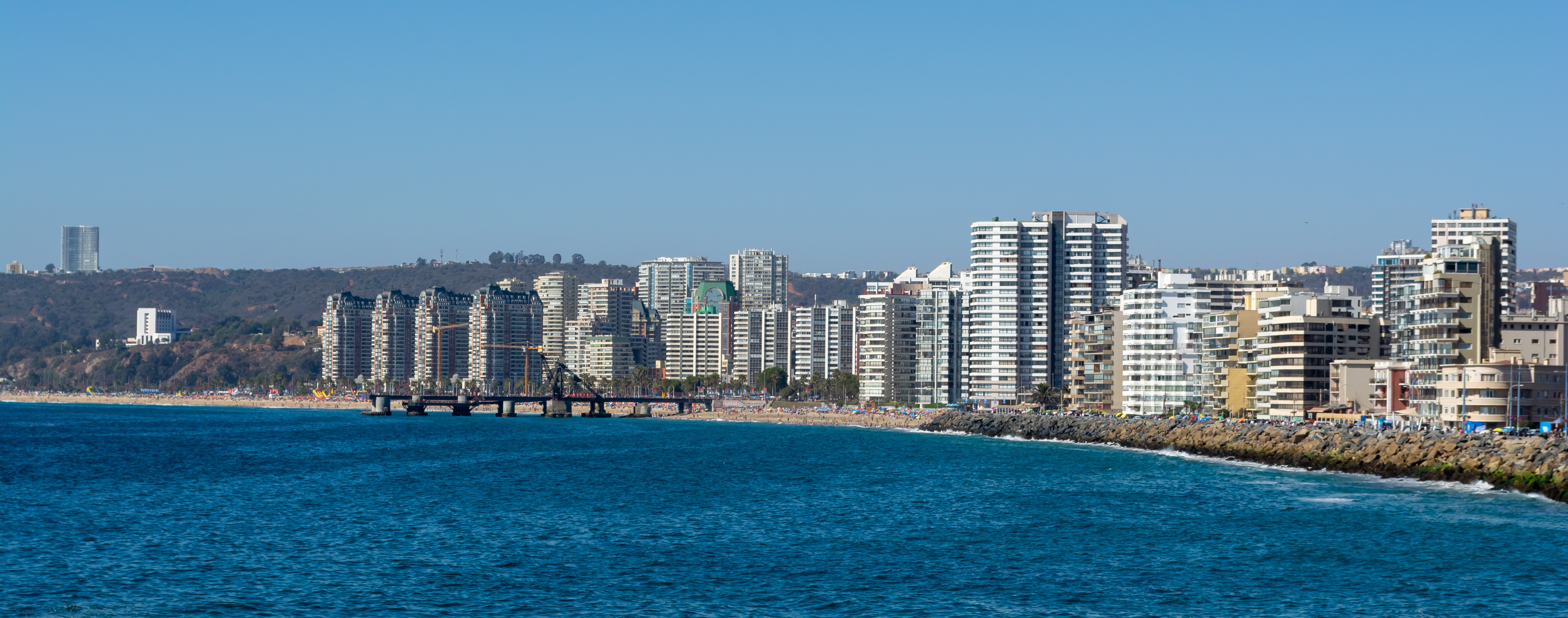
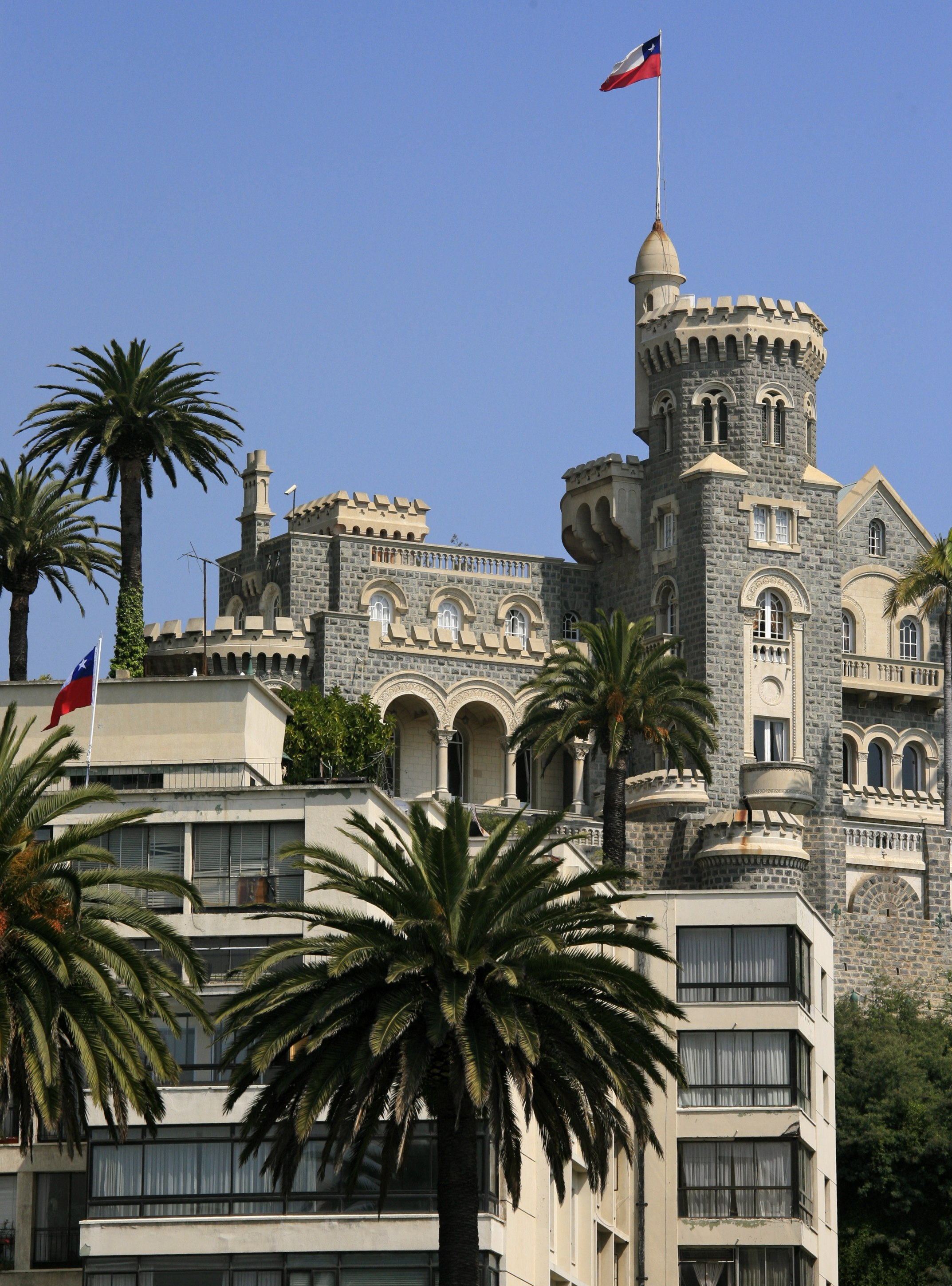
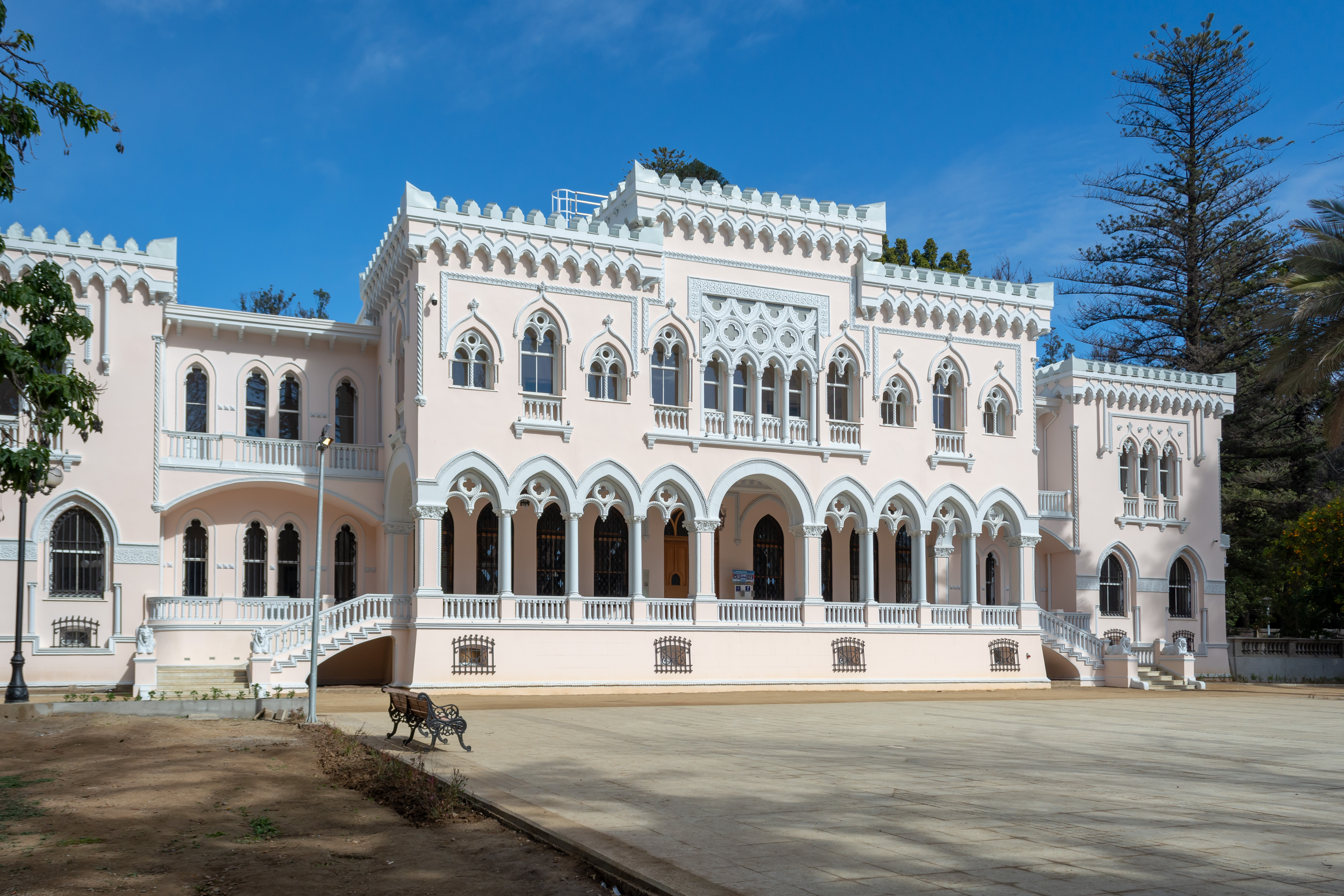
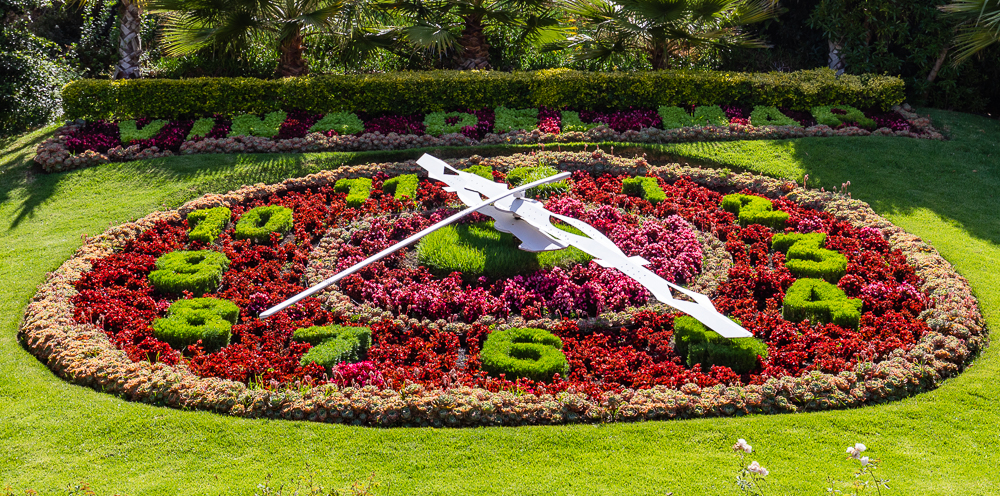
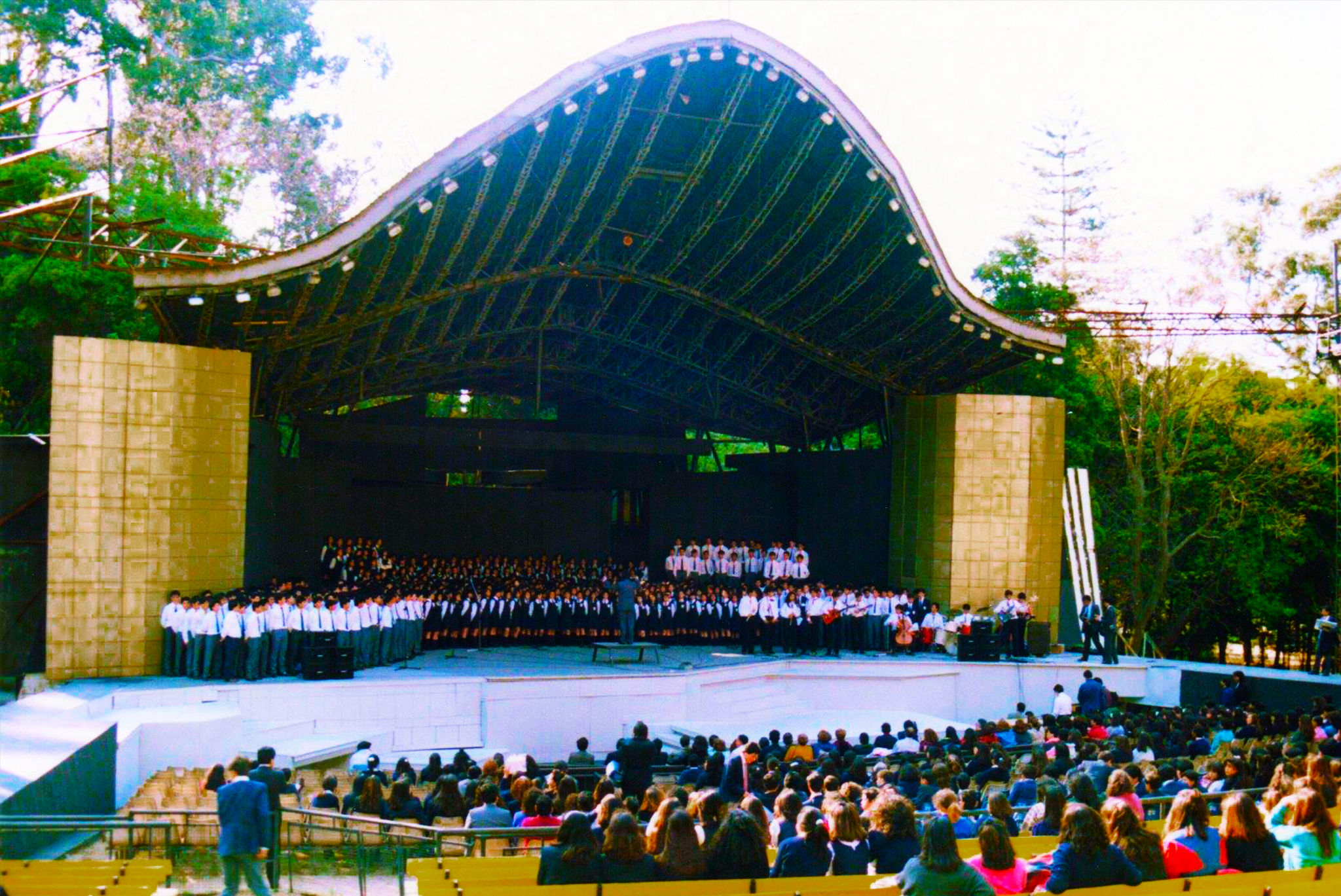
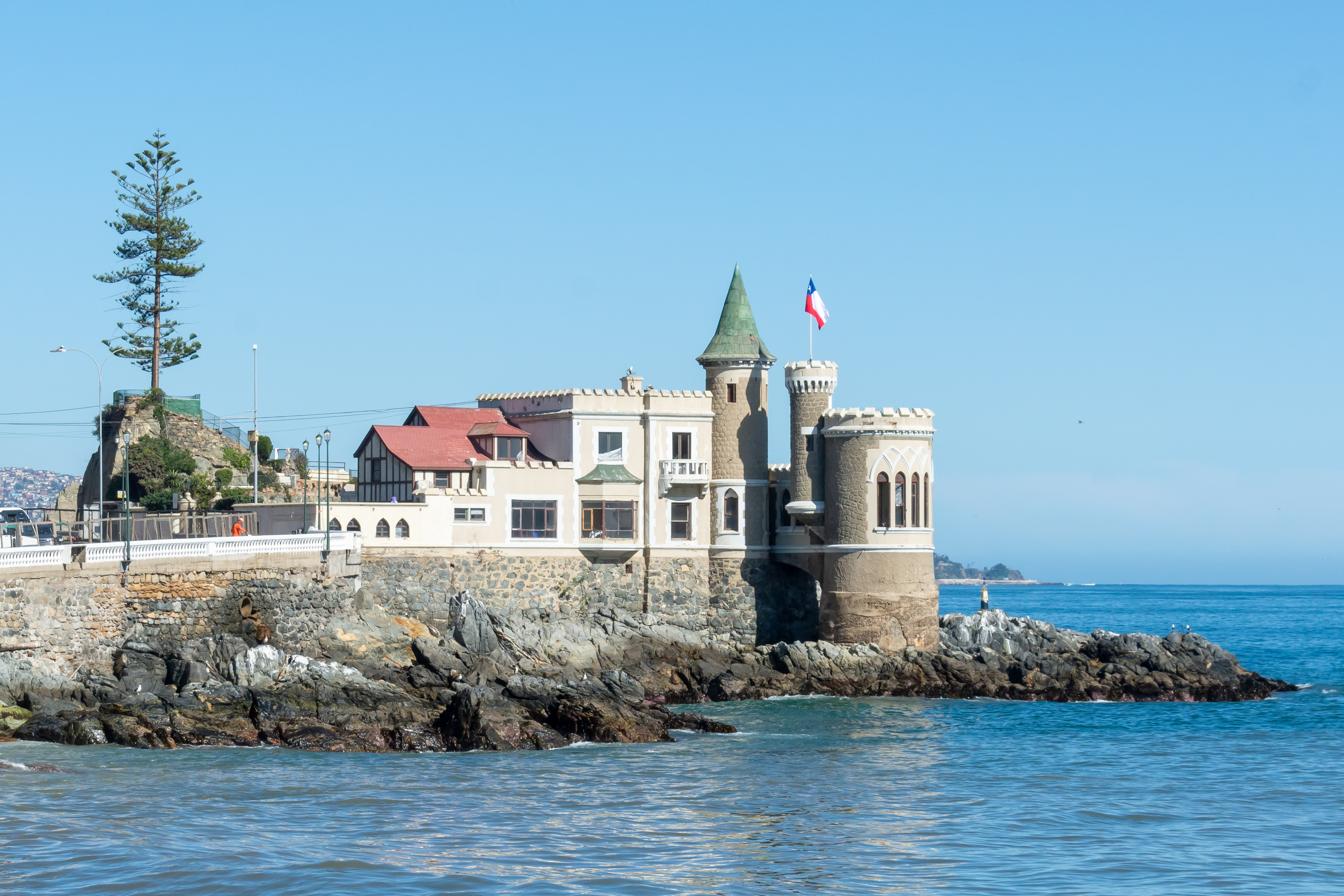
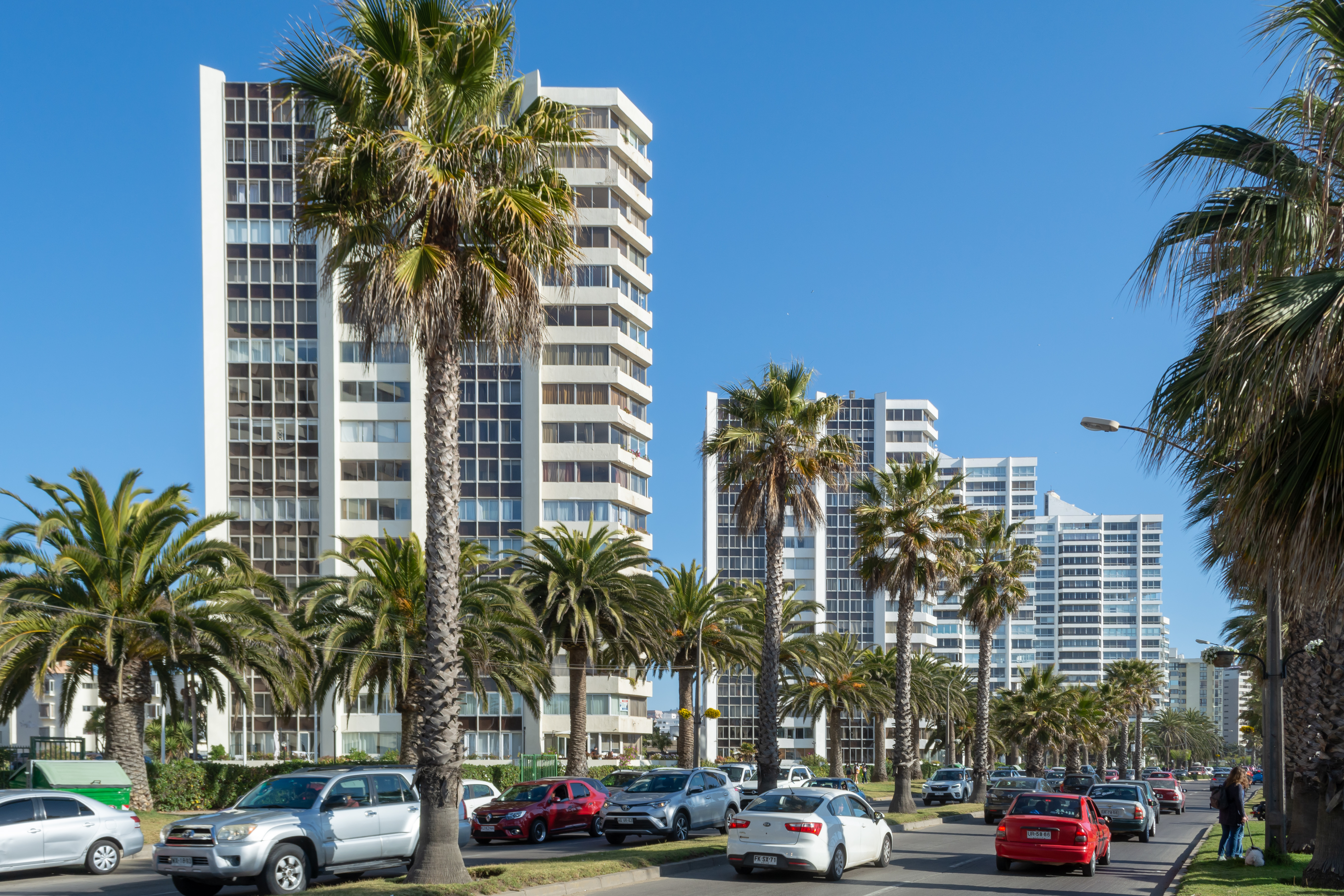
- Coastline of Viña del Mar Brunet Castle Vergara Palace Viña del Mar's flower clock Quinta Vergara Amphitheater Wulff Castle Torres del Pacífico

- Flag Coat of arms Location in Chile
- Nicknames: La Ciudad Jardín ("the Garden City")
- Coordinates (city): 33°01′28″S 71°33′06″W
- Country: Chile
- Region: Valparaíso
- Province: Valparaíso
- Founded: 28 December 1874

Government
  - Type: Municipality
  - Mayor: Macarena Ripamonti (FA)

Area
  - Commune: 121.6 km^{2} (47.0 sq mi)
- Elevation: 2 m (6.6 ft)

Population (2024 census)
  - Commune: 334,871
  - Rank: 6th
  - Density: 2,754/km^{2} (7,132/sq mi)
  - Metro: 951,311
  - Urban: 334,248
- Demonym(s): viñamarino, -a (Spanish)
- Time zone: UTC-4 (CLT)
  - Summer (DST): UTC−3 (CLST)
- Area code: +56 32
- Website: Municipality of Viña del Mar

Viña del Mar (Spanish pronunciation: [ˈbiɲa ðel ˈmaɾ]; meaning "Vineyard of the Sea" or "Vineyard-on-Sea") is a city and commune on central Chile's Pacific coast. Often referred to as La Ciudad Jardín ("The Garden City"), the city is located on the central coast, on the basins of the Reñaca and Marga Marga streams and along the shores of Valparaíso Bay.

It was founded under its current name on 28 December 1874, by the Chilean politician and writer José Francisco Vergara, who, together with his wife Mercedes Alvares, inherited the lands where the city is now located. To this end, he decided to hire a group of engineers who laid out the street plans and formed an urban nucleus.

With a population of 334,871 inhabitants according to the 2024 census, it is the most populous municipality in the region and fourth-largest city in Chile. Furthermore, together with the communes of Valparaíso, Concón, Quilpué, and Villa Alemana, it forms the Greater Valparaíso metropolitan area (pop. 935,602 in the 2017 census), and it is also a twin city of Valparaíso, as it is completely conurbated with it.

== Toponymy ==
Viticulture, an activity facilitated by the soils and climate of central Chile, began in the Marga Marga stream basin when its lands were acquired by Alonso de Riberos in 1580, who planted the first vineyards. Located opposite the path that connected the port of Valparaíso with the Quillota Valley, they came to be known as the Viña de Riberos or Viña de la Mar, a name that first came to encompass the basin, then the settlement established along the banks of the Marga Marga, and later the city itself. The winemaking activity in the area lasted until 1827, when the old vineyards were destroyed by a severe storm of wind and rain.

== History ==
=== Origins ===
The valley where Viña del Mar was founded was known as the valley of Peuco by the Changos, native inhabitants of the area dedicated to fishing. With the arrival of the Spanish conquistadores the valley was divided into two large haciendas. North of the Marga Marga creek up to the current location of Reñaca, Viña del Mar, and to the south up to the current Cerro Barón (Baron Hill), the Hacienda Las Siete Hermanas (The Seven Sisters).

Francisco Javier Alvares authorized the construction of a railroad through his lands to join Santiago and the port of Valparaíso. The arrival of the railroad brought a young engineer Jose Francisco Vergara who married Francisco Javier Alvares's granddaughter, Mercedes Alvares. It was José Francisco Vergara who instigated the idea of the creation of a new city independent of Valparaíso.

=== Expansion and growth ===
The establishment of the Viña del Mar Sugar Refining Company (CRAV) in 1873 and the founding of Lever, Murphy & Co. by the British entrepreneurs Richard Lever and William Murphy in 1883 provided the economic impetus needed to transform the young city into one of the most important in Chile. In 1917, the construction of a military installation for the Coraceros regiment, naval facilities at Las Salinas, and housing for military and naval personnel furthered the city's growth. That same year, a seaside chalet was rebuilt into what is known today as Wulff Castle.

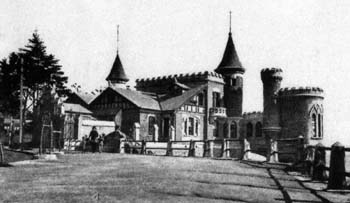
Wulff Castle as seen in 1930

In 1925, the municipal theater was opened in its current location on the eastern side of the city's downtown square, José Francisco Vergara Square. In 1927, the commune of Concón was dissolved and incorporated into Viña del Mar, as part of a nationwide reorganization of communes. In 1928, president Carlos Ibáñez del Campo authorized the creation of a casino, which opened on 31 December 1930 and served as an important catalyst in transforming the city from a quiet coastal settlement into Chile's premier international resort. On 31 January 1931, the Presidential Palace was inaugurated at Castle Hill as a summer residence for the Chilean president. The tourist character of the city was further enhanced by the inauguration of the O'Higgins Hotel in 1936 and the Miramar Hotel by Caleta Abarca Beach in 1945. For a few years in the early 1960s, a trolleybus line connected the city with Valparaíso, and the electric route network included three branches within Viña del Mar. During the 1962 FIFA World Cup, it was one of the four cities that hosted matches, and is now home to CD Everton, a soccer team in the Chilean Premier division, which took its name from the English team. Its home ground is the Sausalito Stadium, named after Sausalito, California, which was named a sister city to Viña del Mar in 1971. In return, the main square in Sausalito, California, is named "Viña del Mar". It is also a sister city of Mar del Plata, Argentina since 1993.

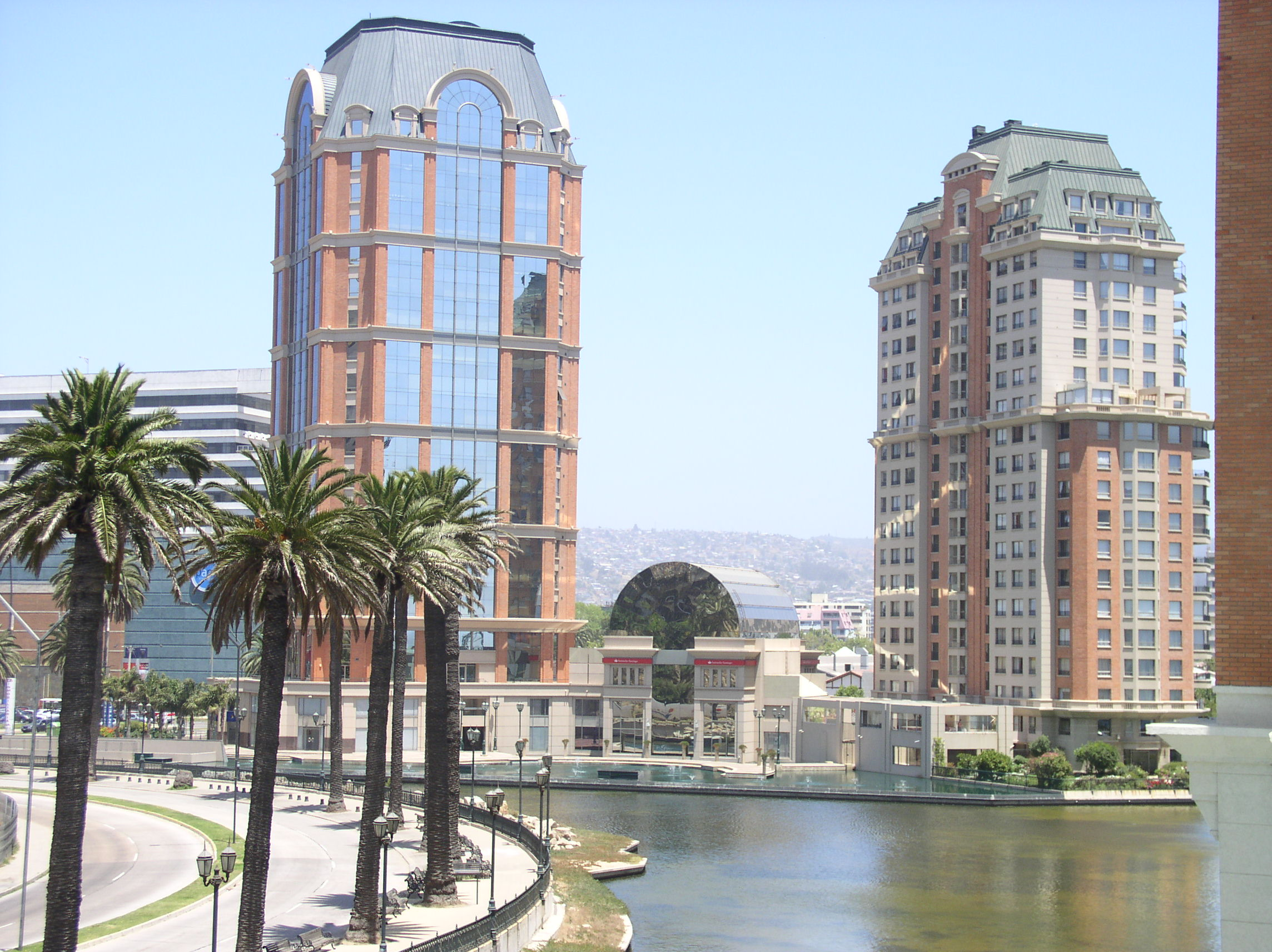
High-rise buildings by the shore

During the 1980s, a global economic downturn seriously affected the city. A number of small and medium-sized factories went bankrupt, including the stationery manufacturer Coda, and most importantly, CRAV, and Textiles Viña, two of the biggest employers in the city. Unemployment rose to alarmingly high rates. Many factories started to consolidate their operations in Santiago, making the situation even worse. The city has failed to fully recover from the blows inflicted by the economic downturn of 1982. However, an increase in the number of international tourists visiting the city, together with the high prices of copper in world markets, has promoted an economic recovery.

In 1995, Concón was re-established as a commune and became independent from Viña del Mar.

The city was affected by the 27 February 2010 earthquake.

== Geography ==
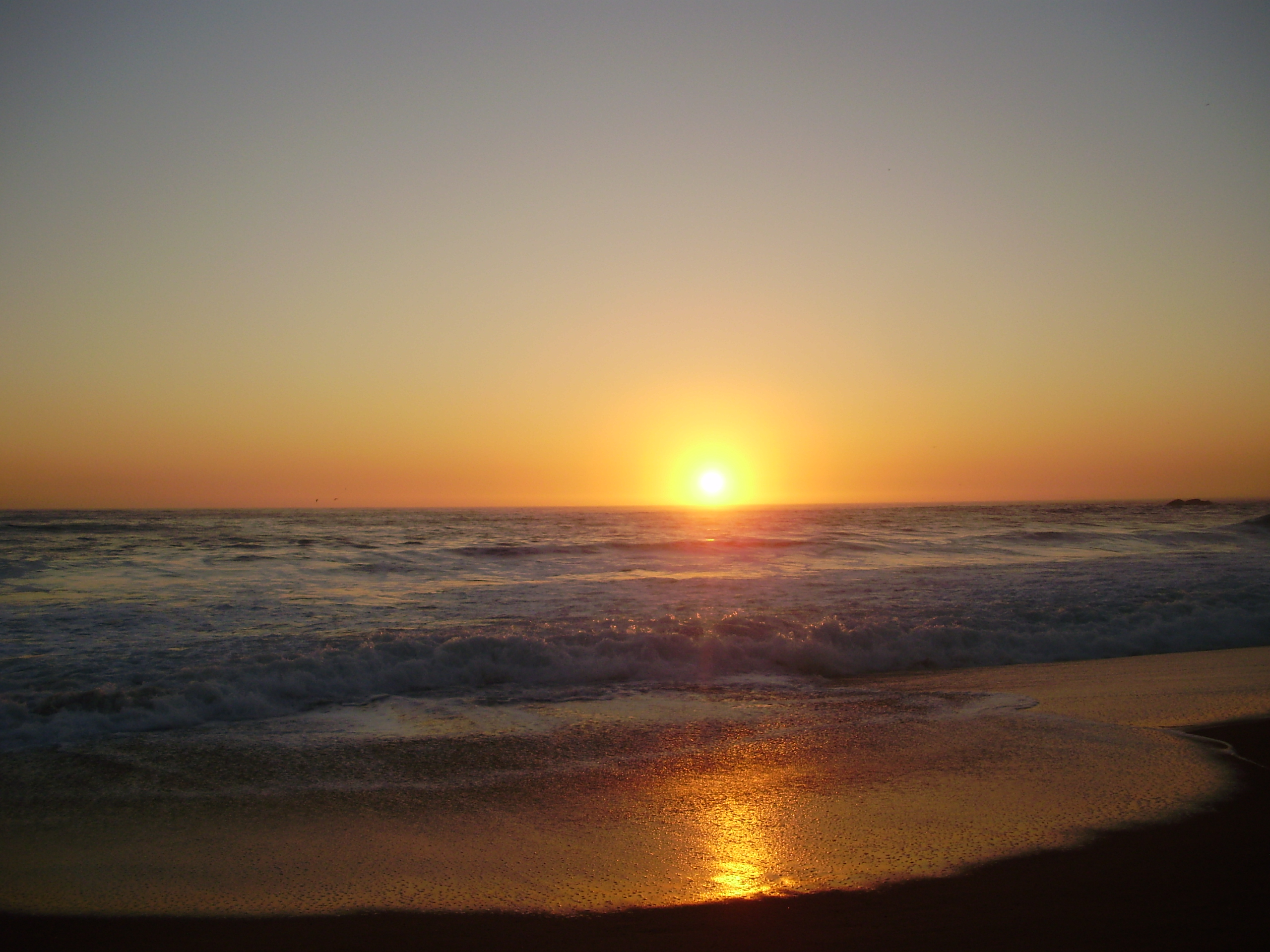
Sunset in Reñaca

Viña del Mar is located on the central coast of mainland Chile at coordinates 33°02′ south latitude and 71°32′ west longitude. Its municipal territory covers an area of 122 km^{2}, and its urban area is conurbated with Greater Valparaíso, having continuity with Concón to the north, Quilpué to the east, and Valparaíso to the south.

The marine otter (Lontra felina), known in Chile as the chungungo, has also been recorded in Viña del Mar; in April 2026, a rehabilitated female known as Changuita was identified in the city seven years after her rehabilitator had lost track of her.

=== Geomorphology ===
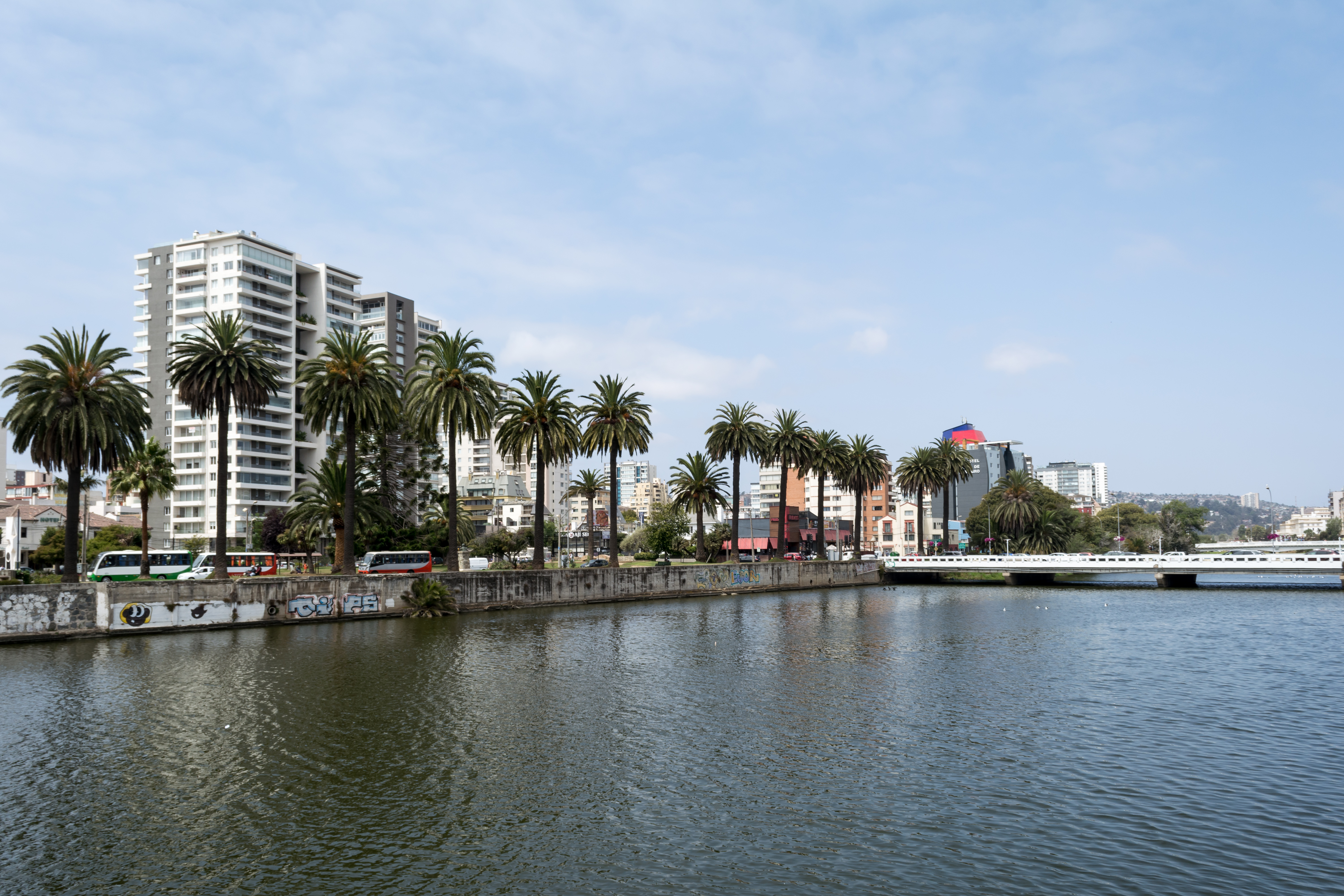
The Marga Marga estuary as it passes through Viña del Mar

Viña del Mar lies in an area characterized by topographic forms that indicate a regressive coastline. Within its administrative boundaries, three different geological units can be distinguished: the coastal plain, the terraced levels, and the hills of the Coastal Range to the east.

The coastal plain is located at the end of the Marga Marga stream valley and corresponds to a terrace formed by marine–fluvial sediments on which the so-called city plan is established, with average elevations between 6 and 9 meters above sea level. This area is bounded by hills of varying altitudes that correspond to the coastal terraces.

To the north and south of the coastal plain are marine or abrasion terraces, over which the city also extends. These areas have a slightly flat surface with gently undulating hills, dissected by deep ravines and zones of erosion. The terraced levels on both sides of the Marga Marga present different elevations: to the northeast of the watercourse, an extensive terrace predominates at elevations between 200 and 250 meters above sea level, while on the southern side altitudes can reach up to 400 meters above sea level.

=== Climate ===
Viña del Mar has a warm-summer Mediterranean climate (Köppen climate classification Csb) influenced on the coast by the Humboldt Current. As in any Mediterranean climate, the city experiences a dry, warm summer but temperatures rarely exceed 30 °C (86 °F) due to the influence of the maritime current offshore. Summer nights are cool with temperatures around 16 °C (61 °F). Winters are damp and cool with daily high temperatures ranging from 13 to 17 °C (55 to 63 °F) and from 5 to 9 °C (41 to 48 °F) at night, rarely falling below freezing. Spring and autumn can vary from mild to cool. The rain falls mainly in autumn and winter, with July being the rainiest (107 mm). The average annual rainfall totals 480 mm.

Climate data for Viña del Mar (Rodelillo Airfield) 1991–2020, extremes 1970–present)
Month	Jan	Feb	Mar	Apr	May	Jun	Jul	Aug	Sep	Oct	Nov	Dec	Year
Record high °C (°F)	34.7 (94.5)	35.1 (95.2)	33.1 (91.6)	35.9 (96.6)	35.3 (95.5)	29.3 (84.7)	31.6 (88.9)	32.4 (90.3)	32.0 (89.6)	32.4 (90.3)	35.0 (95.0)	35.4 (95.7)	35.9 (96.6)
Mean daily maximum °C (°F)	23.4 (74.1)	22.6 (72.7)	22.0 (71.6)	19.9 (67.8)	17.3 (63.1)	15.5 (59.9)	15.0 (59.0)	15.6 (60.1)	16.9 (62.4)	18.6 (65.5)	20.9 (69.6)	22.3 (72.1)	19.2 (66.6)
Daily mean °C (°F)	17.9 (64.2)	17.4 (63.3)	16.8 (62.2)	15.1 (59.2)	13.2 (55.8)	11.6 (52.9)	11.0 (51.8)	11.4 (52.5)	12.4 (54.3)	13.6 (56.5)	15.3 (59.5)	16.7 (62.1)	14.4 (57.9)
Mean daily minimum °C (°F)	12.4 (54.3)	12.3 (54.1)	11.7 (53.1)	10.4 (50.7)	9.1 (48.4)	7.9 (46.2)	7.0 (44.6)	7.2 (45.0)	8.0 (46.4)	8.6 (47.5)	9.8 (49.6)	11.2 (52.2)	9.6 (49.3)
Record low °C (°F)	7.4 (45.3)	6.2 (43.2)	2.3 (36.1)	3.0 (37.4)	2.0 (35.6)	0.1 (32.2)	0.1 (32.2)	−0.1 (31.8)	1.1 (34.0)	2.4 (36.3)	1.6 (34.9)	5.5 (41.9)	−0.1 (31.8)
Average precipitation mm (inches)	0.7 (0.03)	1.1 (0.04)	3.9 (0.15)	20.4 (0.80)	96.0 (3.78)	161.7 (6.37)	89.3 (3.52)	88.7 (3.49)	37.9 (1.49)	15.5 (0.61)	5.0 (0.20)	3.7 (0.15)	523.9 (20.63)
Average precipitation days (≥ 1.0 mm)	0.1	0.1	0.6	1.7	3.9	5.9	4.7	4.3	2.8	1.4	0.6	0.6	26.7
Source 1: Dirección Meteorológica de Chile
Source 2: NOAA (precipitation days 1991–2020)

== Demographics ==
According to the 2024 census of the National Statistics Institute, Viña del Mar had 334,871 inhabitants (158,878 men and 175,993 women), making the commune an entirely urban area. The population grew by 0.19% (623 persons) between the 2017 and 2024 censuses. Viña del Mar accounts for 17.65% of the regional population.

=== Religion ===
In 2024, the population aged 15 or older was 66.9% Christian (53.8% Catholic, 9.6% Evangelical, and 3.5% other branches), 0.2% Jewish, 0.1% Muslim, 0.2% Buddhist, 0.6% other religions, 0.7% undeclared, and 31.3% with no religion.

=== Population distribution ===
The territorial configuration of Viña del Mar's urban area is characterized by the presence of a zone known as the plan, which corresponds to the coastal plain of the Marga Marga stream. This area contains the oldest sector of the city and concentrates the vast majority of services and commercial activities, as well as a residential sector for higher-income groups. The residential area where more than 80% of the population lives is located in the territories situated on the hills surrounding the plan, which are home to middle and lower-middle social strata, with the exception of the neighborhoods of Recreo and Reñaca, where middle- and upper-income socioeconomic groups predominate.

== Economy ==
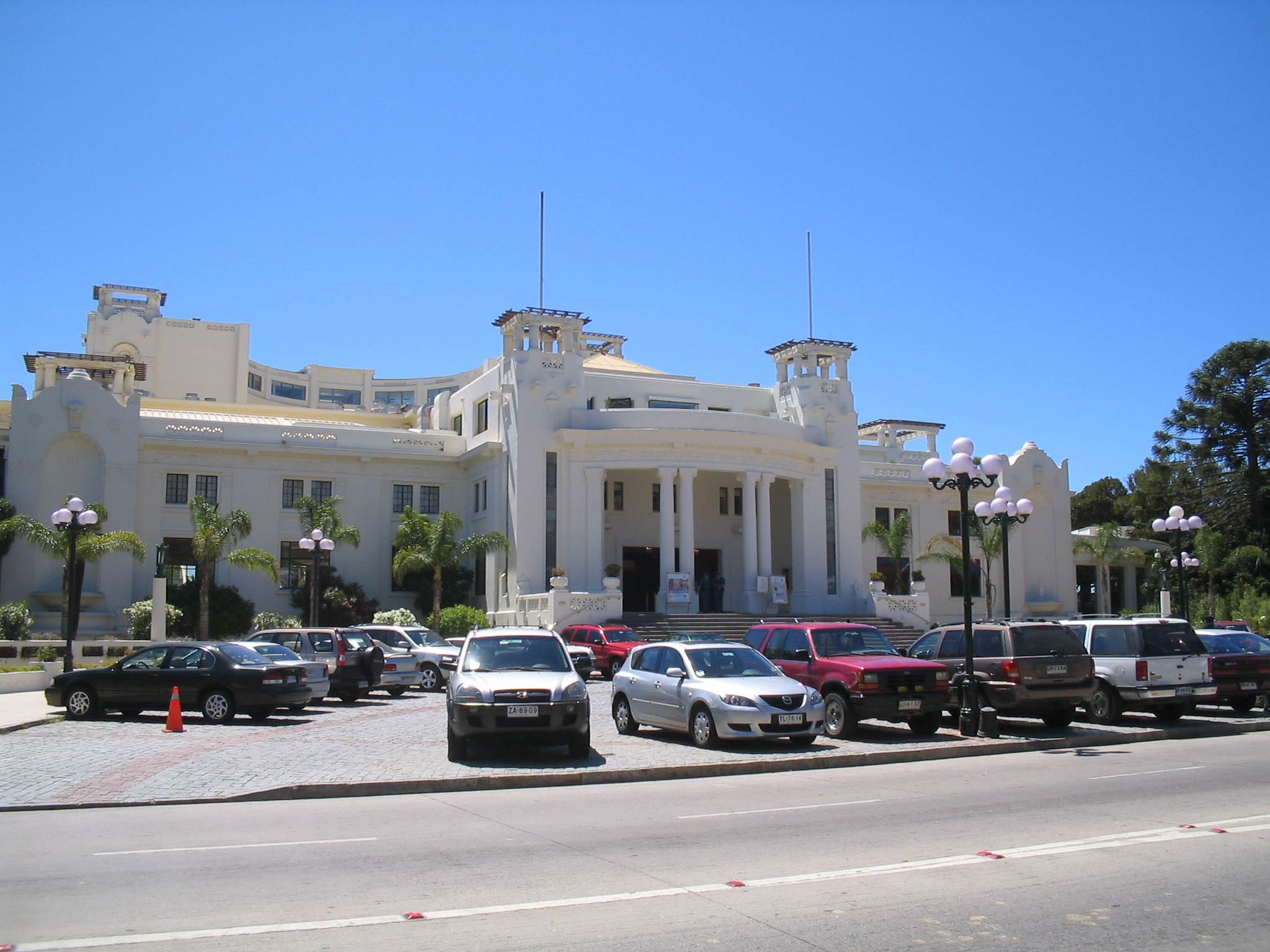
Viña del Mar Casino

Viña del Mar, along with the rest of the coastal municipalities of Greater Valparaíso, is part of the tourist area of the country, which has resulted in large dividends paid by this industry each year to the community. Viña del Mar has a wide range of hotels and has upgraded its infrastructure to improve its tourist appeal.

An important place is the Casino de Viña del Mar, which opened in 1930 and for years was one of the few casinos in Chile. The casino also houses the Hotel del Mar. With the introduction of the Gambling Casinos Act, which resulted in increased competition, viñamarino enclosure has suffered great economic losses, thus affecting the municipal coffers.

The industrial district of Viña del Mar is called El Salto. It is located in the place where the Estero Marga Marga Delta begins to appear. They give access to the metro and the South Trunk Highway.

Viña del Mar has the largest number of businesses in the city of Valparaíso, which, along with other areas of Santiago, is becoming a favorite for business to establish investment locations. Forbes also considered one of the most exclusive resorts in Latin America, the level of Punta del Este in Uruguay, Pucón in southern Chile and Mar del Plata in Argentina.

Currently performed one of the most important events in Hispanic America haute couture, together with those of Buenos Aires, Santiago, São Paulo, and Rio de Janeiro.

Extensive commercial redevelopment in the Benidorm Avenue area, previously an abandoned industrial area, has resulted in most of the large Chilean retail chains settling there. The area is now home to large shopping malls, such as Marina Arauco, as well as cinemas, fast food stores, and supermarkets.

== Administration ==
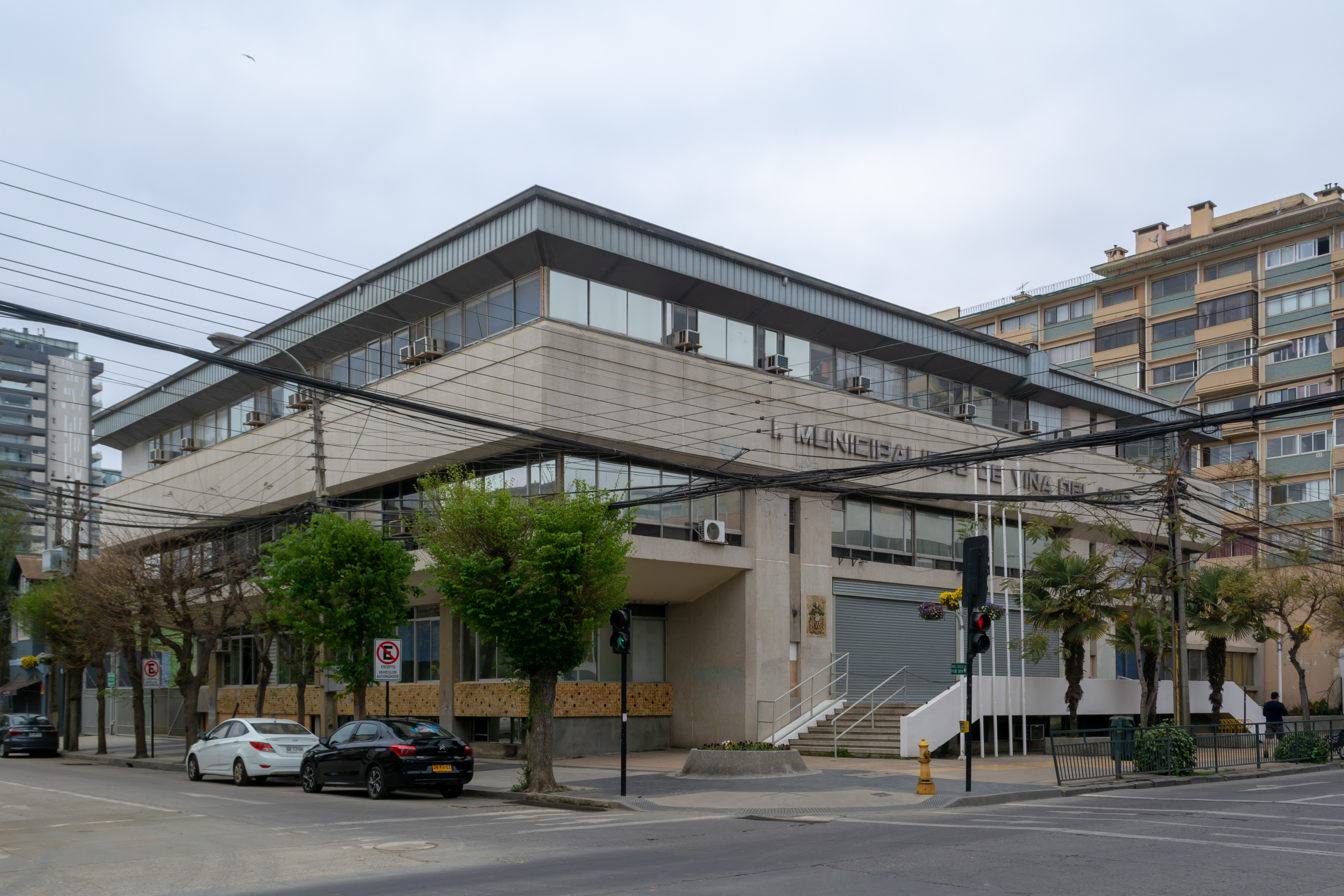
Viña del Mar city hall in 2021

The local administration of the commune resides in the municipality, an autonomous public-law corporation with legal personality and its own assets, composed of a mayor and a municipal council, who are elected every four years by universal suffrage. According to the provisions of the Organic Constitutional Law of Municipalities, which establishes the number of councilors to be elected based on the number of voters in the commune, the municipal council of Viña del Mar is made up of 10 councilors.

Broad Front politician Macarena Ripamonti has been the mayor of Viña del Mar since 2021, while the municipal council for the 2024–2028 term has the following members:

- Antonella Pecchenino Lobos (REP)
- Andrés Solar Miranda (REP)
- Francisco Mejías Díaz (REP)
- José Tomás Bartolucci Schiappacasse (Ind./UDI)
- Antonia Scarella Chamy (Ind./UDI)
- Carlos Williams Arriola (Ind./RN)
- Nancy Díaz Soto (FA)
- Alejandro Aguilera Moya (FA)
- Nicolás López Pimentel (PC)
- Sandro Puebla Veas (Ind./PS)

=== Parliamentary representation ===
At the parliamentary level, Viña del Mar belongs to Electoral District No. 7 and the Sixth Senatorial Constituency (Valparaíso Region). It is represented in the Chamber of Deputies of the National Congress by deputies Luis Sánchez (REP), Sebastián Zamora (Ind./REP), Hotuiti Teao (Ind.), Andrés Celis (RN), Jaime Bassa (FA), Jorge Brito (FA), Luis Cuello (PC), and Juan Valenzuela (PDG) for the 2026–2030 term. It is also represented in the Senate of Chile by senators Arturo Squella (REP), Andrés Longton (RN), Diego Ibáñez (FA), Camila Flores (RN), and Karol Cariola (PC) for the 2026–2034 term.

== Culture ==
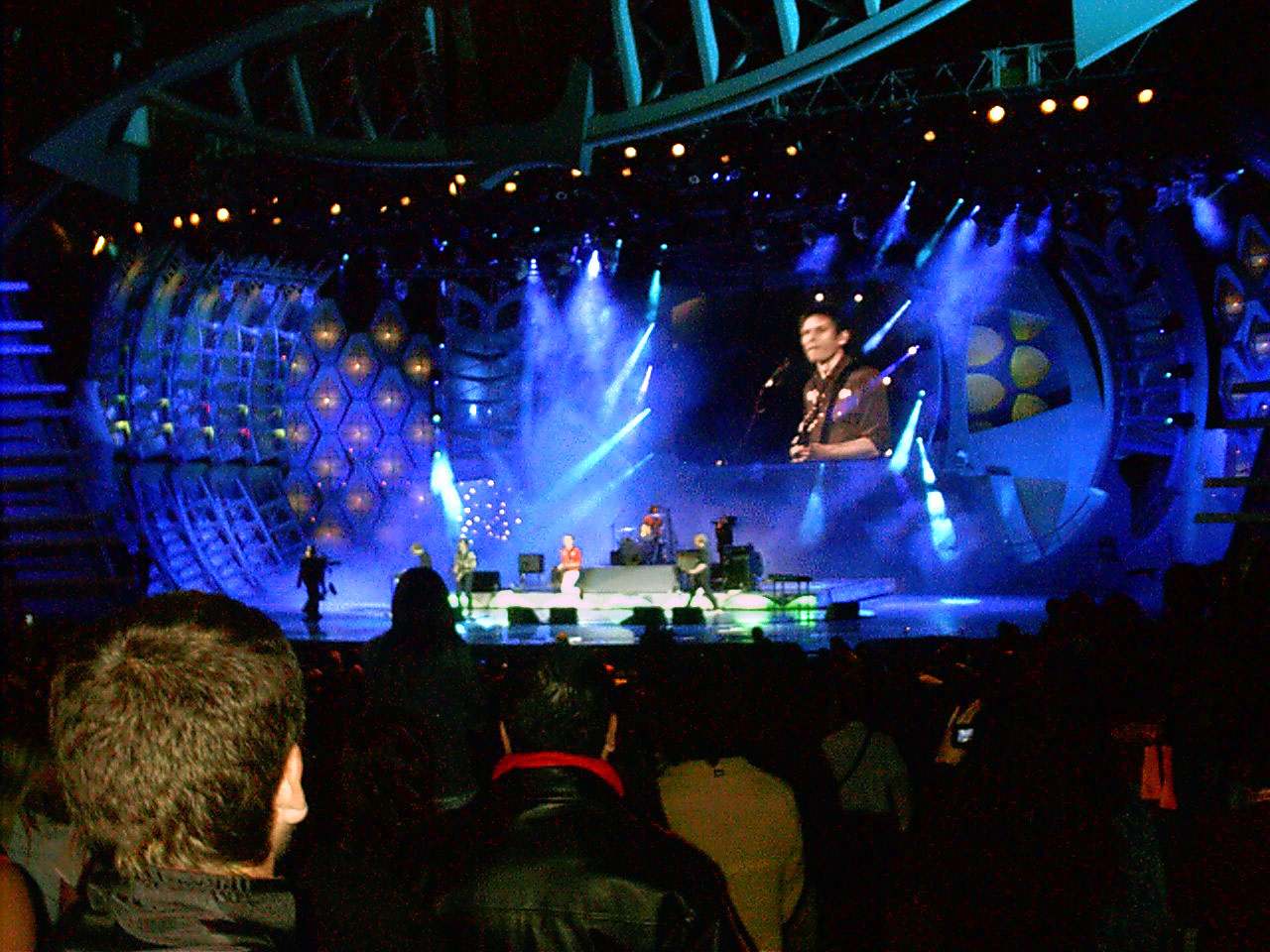
Scottish rock group Franz Ferdinand performing live at the Viña del Mar Festival in 2006

Numerous bars and restaurants have recently opened in the area around Plaza México and Avenida San Martín, offering Chilean and international cuisine. Seafood restaurants are located on the Camino Costero (Coast Roadway) that joins Viña del Mar and Concón, a coastal town to the north.

The Yacht Club de Chile is a yacht club located in Caleta Higuerillas. This club was established in Viña del Mar in 1955, though it is now part of the Concón municipality.

The VTR Open was a professional men's tennis tournament played yearly on outdoor red clay courts at the Club Naval de Campo Las Salinas.

The Viña del Mar International Film Festival is considered among the most important film festivals in Chile and Latin America.

Another important event is the Viña del Mar International Song Festival, held at the amphitheater located in the Quinta Vergara, one of the largest green areas of the city. The amphitheater of the Quinta Vergara was built in the 1960s.

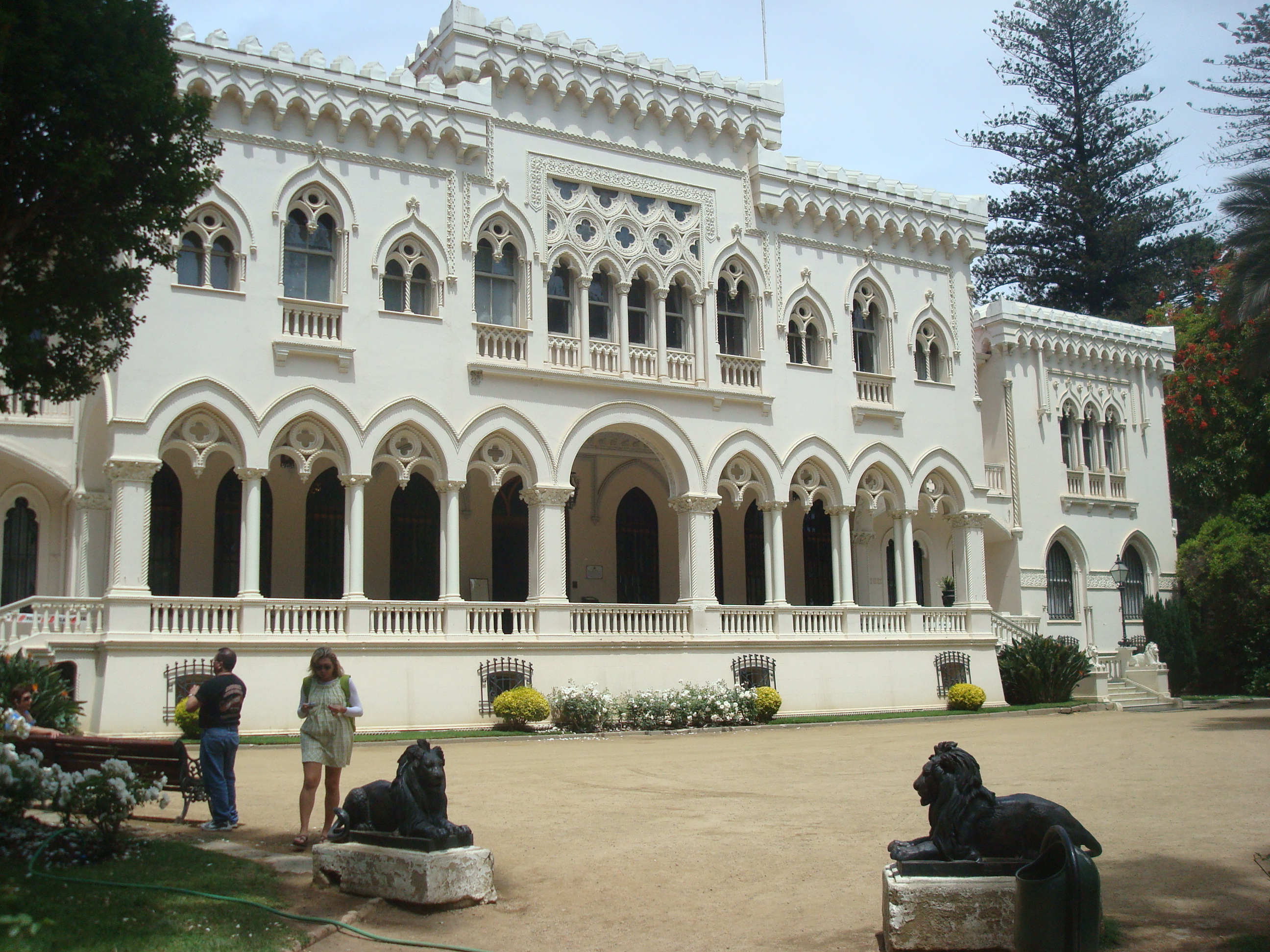
Vergara Palace

There is also the Vergara Palace, home to Viña's fine arts museum.

The Municipal Theatre of Viña del Mar, located in front of Plaza de Viña, is a center of cultural and artistic events of first importance in Chile. In the neighboring block is also the traditional and elegant Club de Viña, with its classical facade.

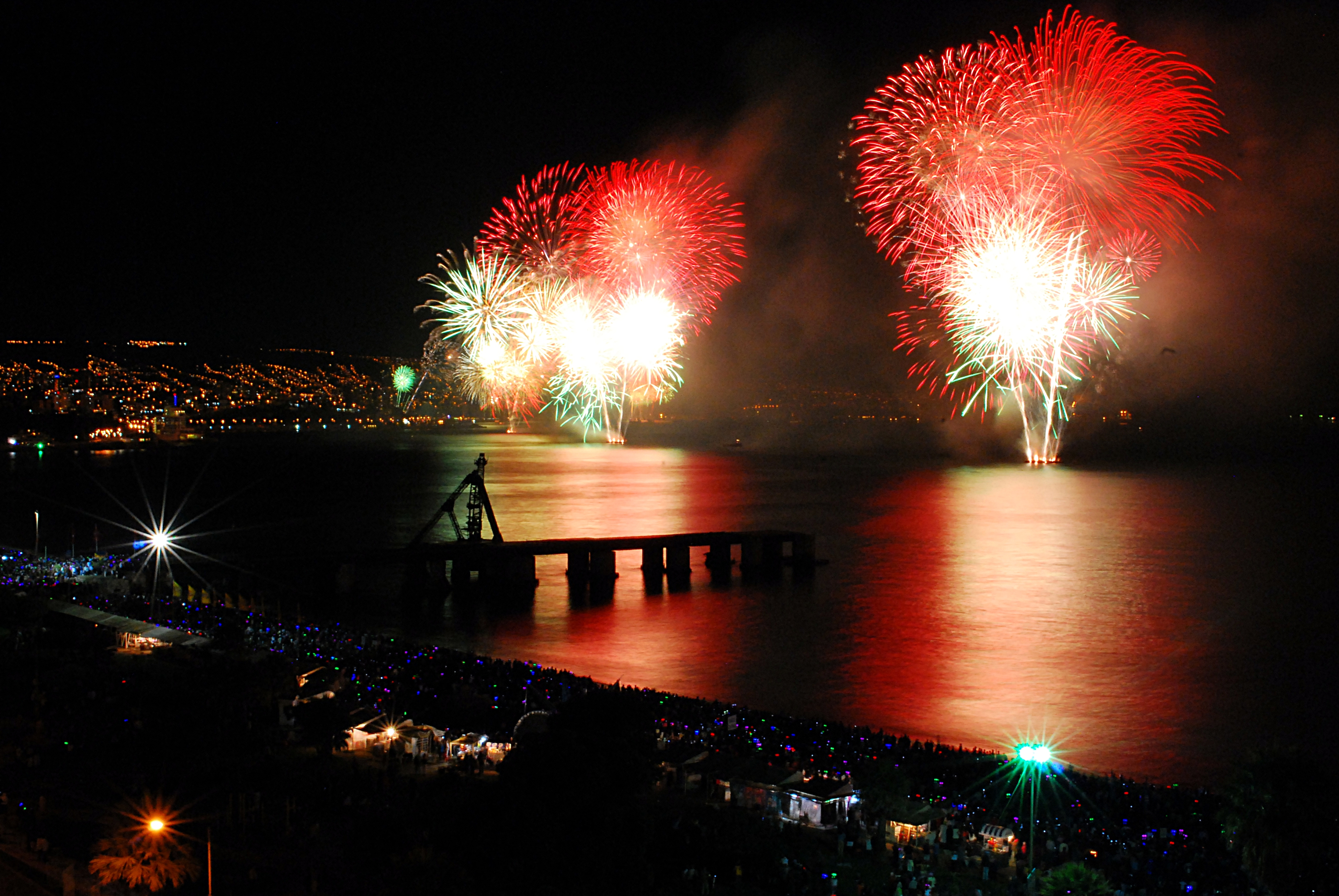
Fireworks launched from the sea for New Year's 2007

The Museum of Naval Canons is an outdoor museum, located on the road Jorge Montt (connecting Viña del Mar with the beaches of Las Salinas and Reñaca), whose beach exhibits several pieces of artillery in front of the facilities of the Chilean Navy.

The Fonk Museum founded in 1937, is a museum that shows objects from native villages and from cultures such as Rapanui, atacameños, Diaguitas and Mapuches, in addition to a collection of Peruvian pre-Columbian jars. In the area of natural sciences there is a sample of arthropods and animals of different zones of the country.

== City landmarks ==
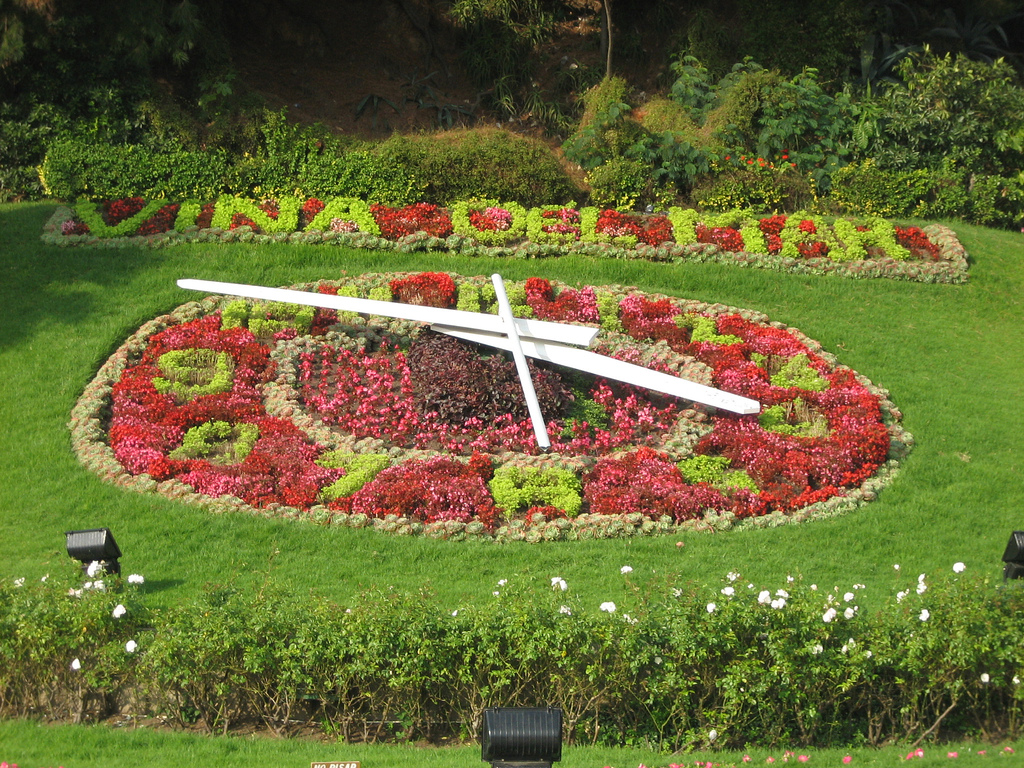
View of the flower clock, one of the main tourist landmarks of the city

Visitors and locals enjoy the parks and water fountains of the city, including a large flower clock (Reloj de Flores) with its numbers made up of flowering plants, near Caleta Abarca beach. The Valparaiso Sporting Club horse racing track is another major landmark. Jardín Botánico or Parque del Salitre, a large botanical garden on the outskirts of the city, was originally designed and built by an entrepreneur who became wealthy from exploiting saltpeter resources in northern Chile.

A few buildings from the 19th century still remain after multiple earthquakes that have destroyed most of the old areas of the city. Most of the older buildings that remain are located along Avenida Libertad (Liberty Avenue), Quillota Street and Quinta Vergara, a large park in the middle of the city. The presidential summer residence, Presidential Palace, is located on Castle Hill.

The city's casino was designed in art deco style and is surrounded by well-tended gardens (hence the city's nickname). In 2004, a hotel (Hotel del Mar) was added to the 1931s building, resembling the architectural features of the original building.

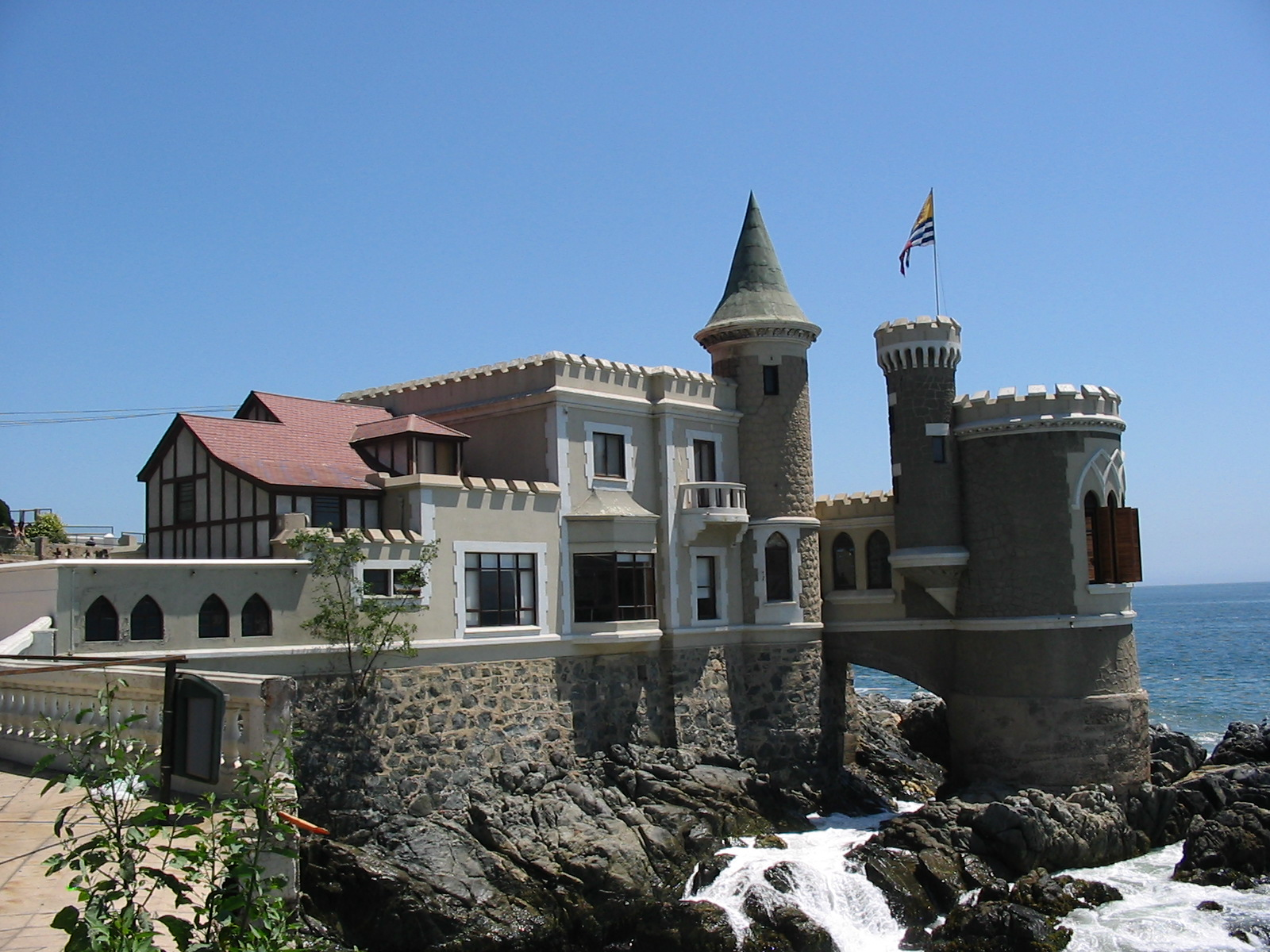
Wulff Castle, pictured in 2008

Rioja Palace, a mansion built by Fernando Rioja in 1907, located on Quillota Street, houses an environmental museum. The Fonck Museum, located in Cuatro Norte Street, has a large exhibition of pre-Columbian articles, and a large moai (Easter Island statue made of volcanic rock), the only one in mainland Chile, is also on display. Carrasco Palace, built by Emilio Carrasco in 1912, now houses the Municipal Library and also is used for arts exhibitions. The building is also surrounded by nice gardens adorned with fine sculptures including a Rodin. Vergara Palace located in Quinta Vergara was built by Blanca Vergara (daughter of José Francisco) in 1906 and it is now owned by the municipality. It currently houses the School of Fine Arts and has produced important Chilean artists like the painter Giancarlo Bertini.

Brunet Castle (also known as "Yarur Castle") was built in 1923 by Adolfo Brunet on Castle Hill, close to the presidential mansion. Currently it is owned by Carabineros de Chile (Chilean police) and is used as a reception center for important visitors. It was declared a national monument in 2005.

Carrasco Palace and its surrounding park, located on Liberty Avenue #250, between 3 and 4 Norte, was completed in 1923. For years it was a private residence until it moved to the Municipality of Viña del Mar. After moving it to its current location in Arlegui street, the Carrasco Palace became a Library Benjamín Vicuña Mackenna, public library of the commune, while working as center for events, art exhibitions, and cultural workshops. It is very important to stress that the building is totally unsuitable for use as a public library and the community needs a new building for this purpose. Outside the entrance to the Carrasco Palace there is a sculpture by Auguste Rodin called "La Defensa." It was declared a national historic monument on 8 September 1986 under Supreme Decree No. 791.

Castillo Wulff, is an iconic building of the commune of neo-Tudor style, built in 1906. Strategically located in the coastal border between the mouth of Marga Marga and Caleta Abarca (Avenida Marina N° 37). It was built by Don Gustavo Wulff Mowle (1862–1946) a businessman and philanthropist of Valparaíso. The building was designed in two floors connected to a torreón through a medieval-style bridge. In 1995 it was declared a national monument, but today houses the offices of the headquarters of the Heritage Unit of the Municipality of Viña del Mar. It is also the location of the distinguished Castillo del Mar (Club Árabe, a seafood restaurant).

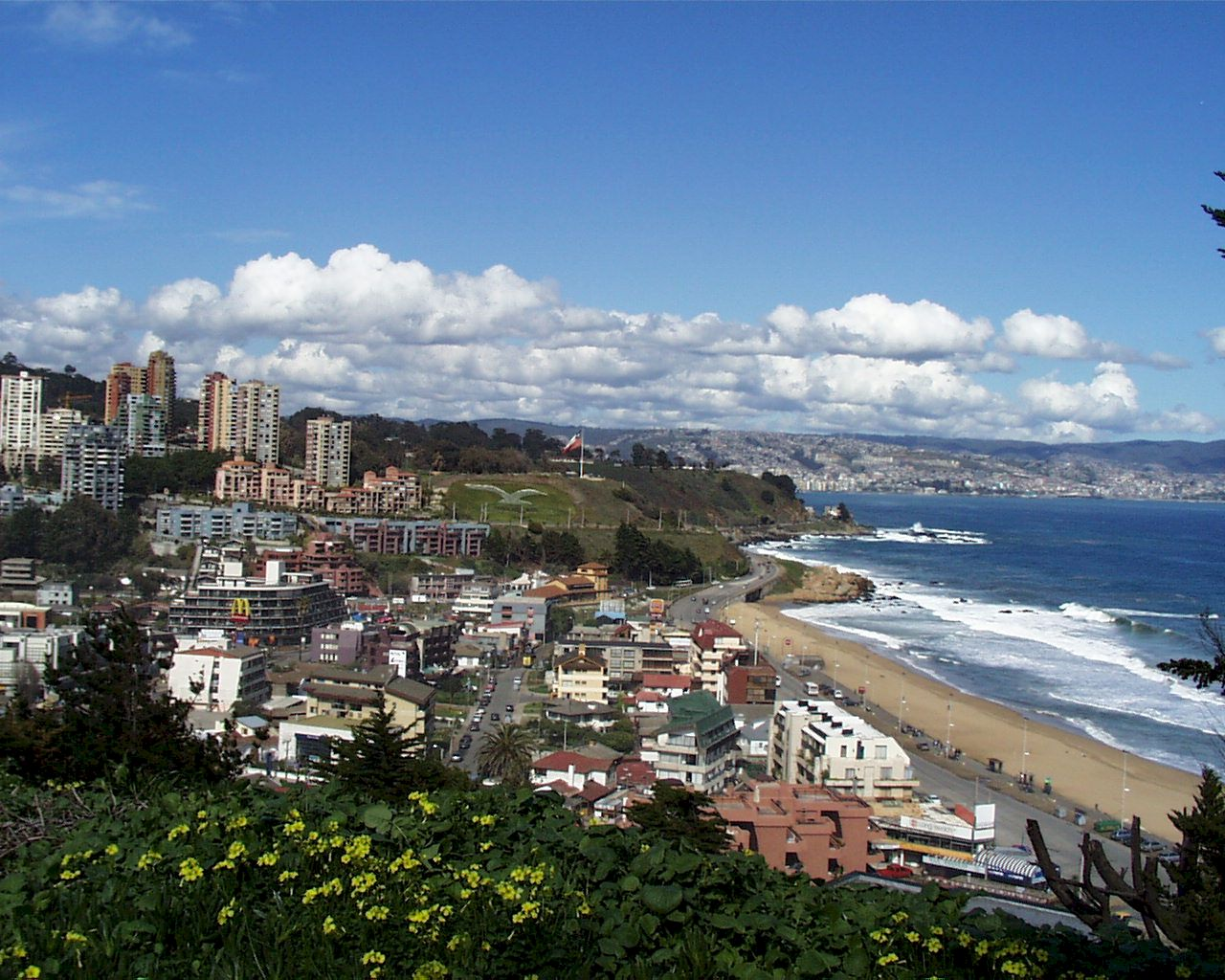
Panoramic view of Reñaca

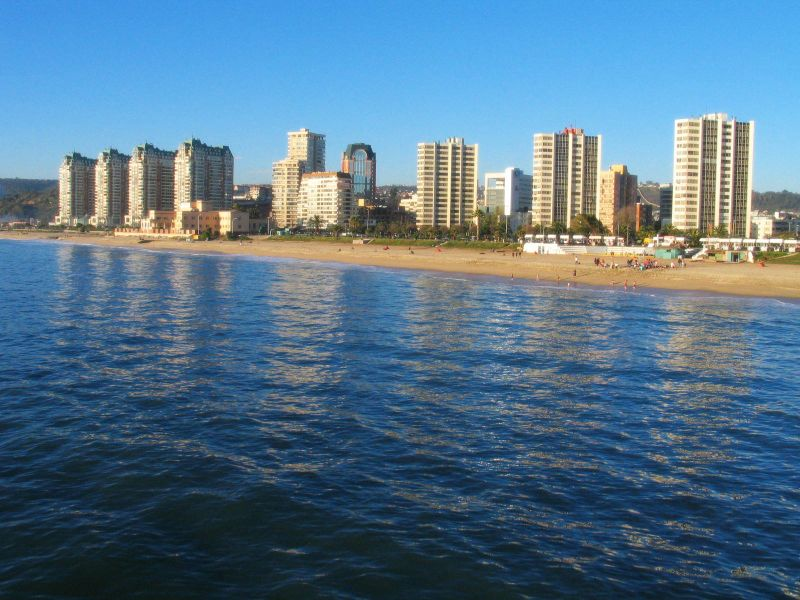
Beach in Viña del Mar

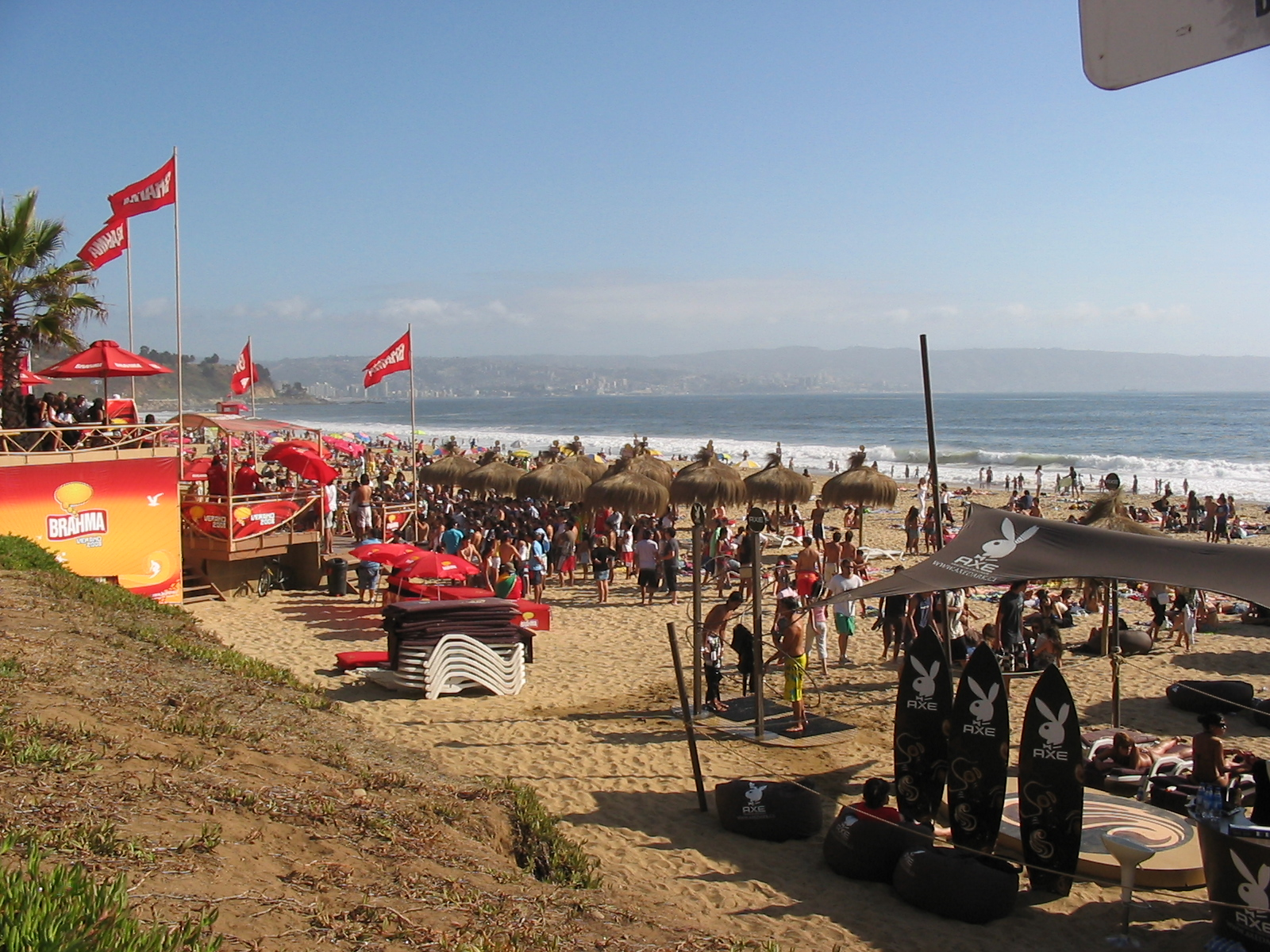
Reñaca beach

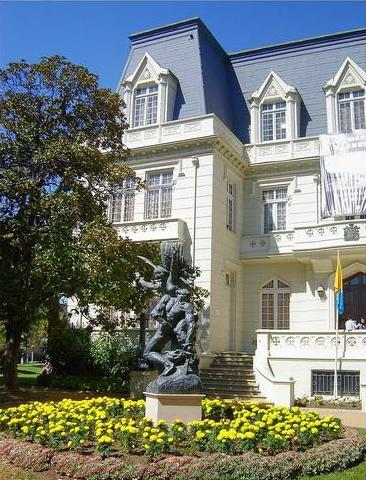
Carrasco Palace

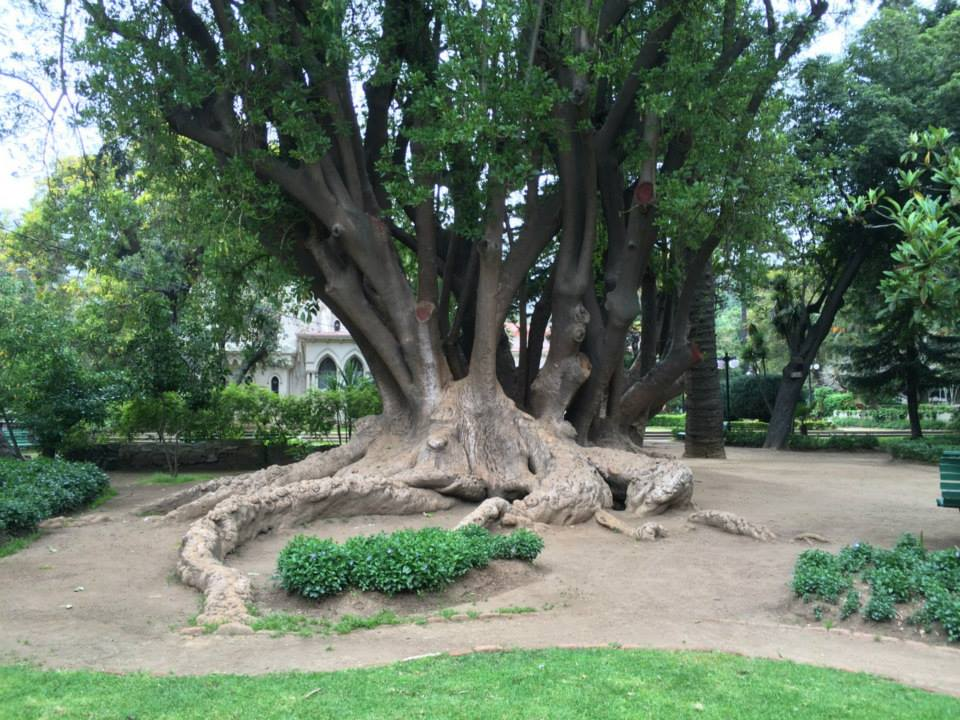
Quinta Vergara

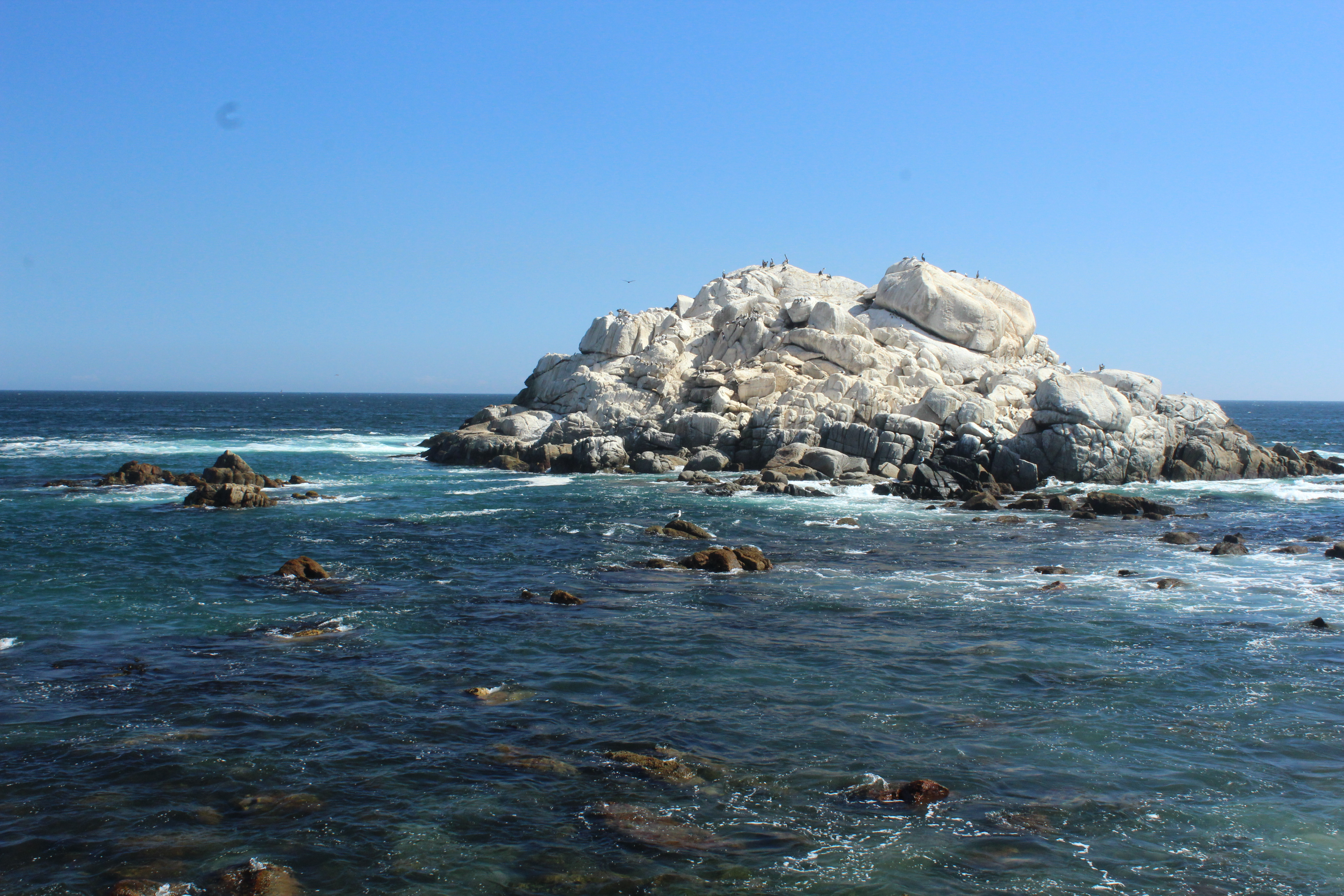
Marine life rock, Reñaca

Rioja palace

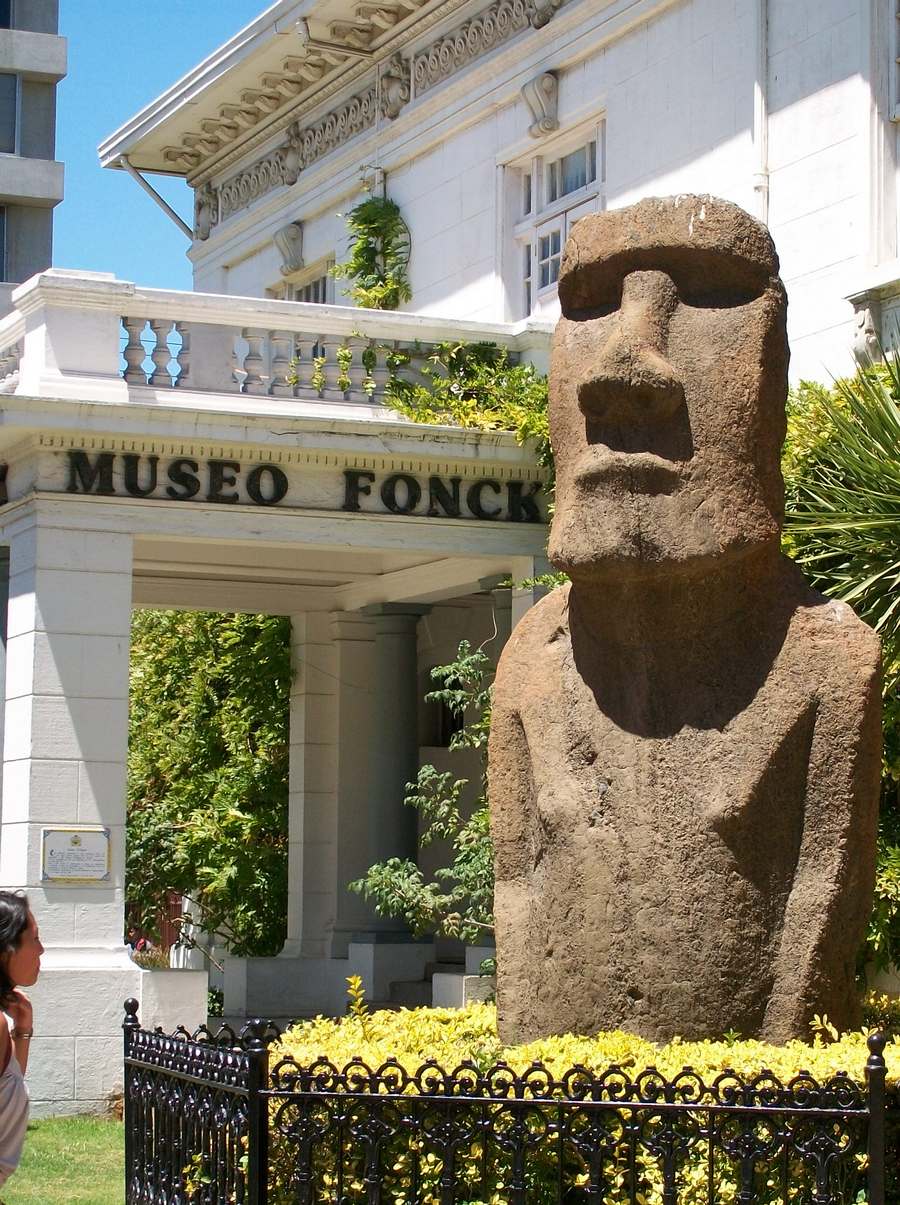
Fonck museum

== Sports ==
The development of sports in the city began with the founding of Valparaiso Sporting Club, also known as Sporting, in 1882. The club hosts multiple sports, but since its inception, it has mostly identified with horseback riding. Since 1885, Sporting has hosted the horse race known as The Derby, one of the most classic races of Chilean equestrianism, being part of the national Triple Crown. Its facilities have also hosted clubs of cricket, soccer, golf, tennis – and if we include the nearby Viña del Mar Lawn Tennis Club, rugby, paper chase, and polo. Valparaiso Sporting Club also held the first international football match played in Chile, in which the country's national team faced their Argentinean counterpart. Sporting also was the only venue for the South American Championship in 1920.

Each summer, The Mackay School hosts two Rugby sevens tournaments, one for youth and one for adults (usually lasting two or three days), with participating teams coming from Chile, Argentina, and Uruguay.

Everton de Viña del Mar represents the city in football tournaments at the national level. The club was founded in 1909 on Alegre Hill in Valparaíso, and later moved to Viña del Mar in the 1940s. Everton owns 4 First Division national titles and plays home games at Sausalito Stadium, which hosted 1962 FIFA World Cup, Copa America 1991, and Copa America 2015 matches. The first team created in the city independent of the clubs of Valparaiso was the Sporting Club de Viña which is said to have played and tied the first international soccer match in Chile.

== Infrastructure ==
Major investment tenders have been issued to improve the city's road infrastructure.

=== Health ===
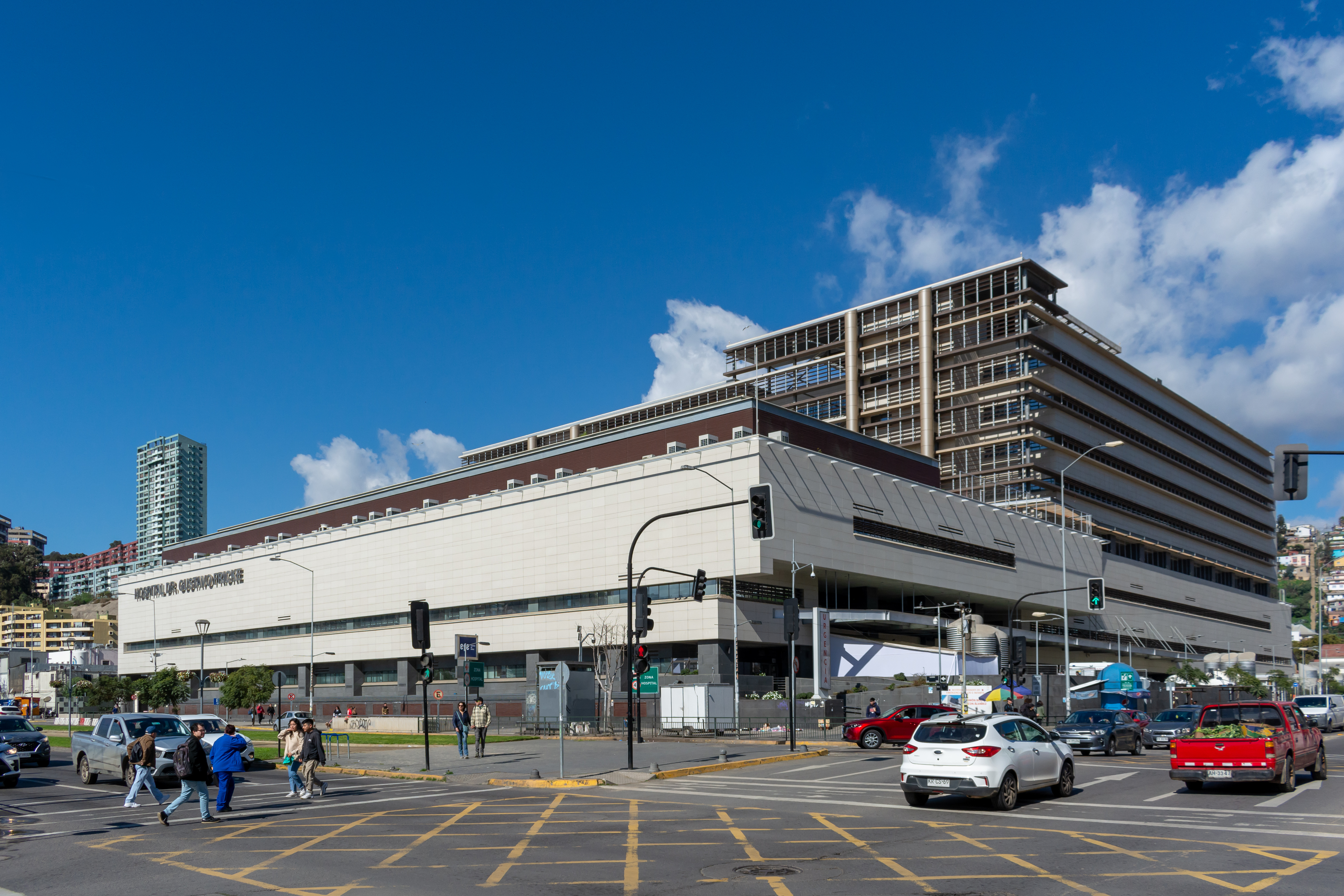
Dr. Gustavo Fricke Hospital in 2023

Viña del Mar has the Dr. Gustavo Fricke Hospital, the Viña del Mar Clinical Hospital (Hospital Clínico de Viña del Mar), the Admiral Nef Naval Hospital (Hospital Naval Almirante Nef), and the Ciudad del Mar Clinic (Clínica Ciudad del Mar).

=== Security and public order ===
Within the commune, the Chilean Navy maintains the Naval War College (Academia de Guerra Naval), the Naval Polytechnic Academy (Academia Politécnica Naval), the Naval Health School (Escuela de Sanidad Naval), the Admiral Nef Naval Hospital, and the Naval Cannons Museum (Museo de Cañones Navales).

=== Transport ===
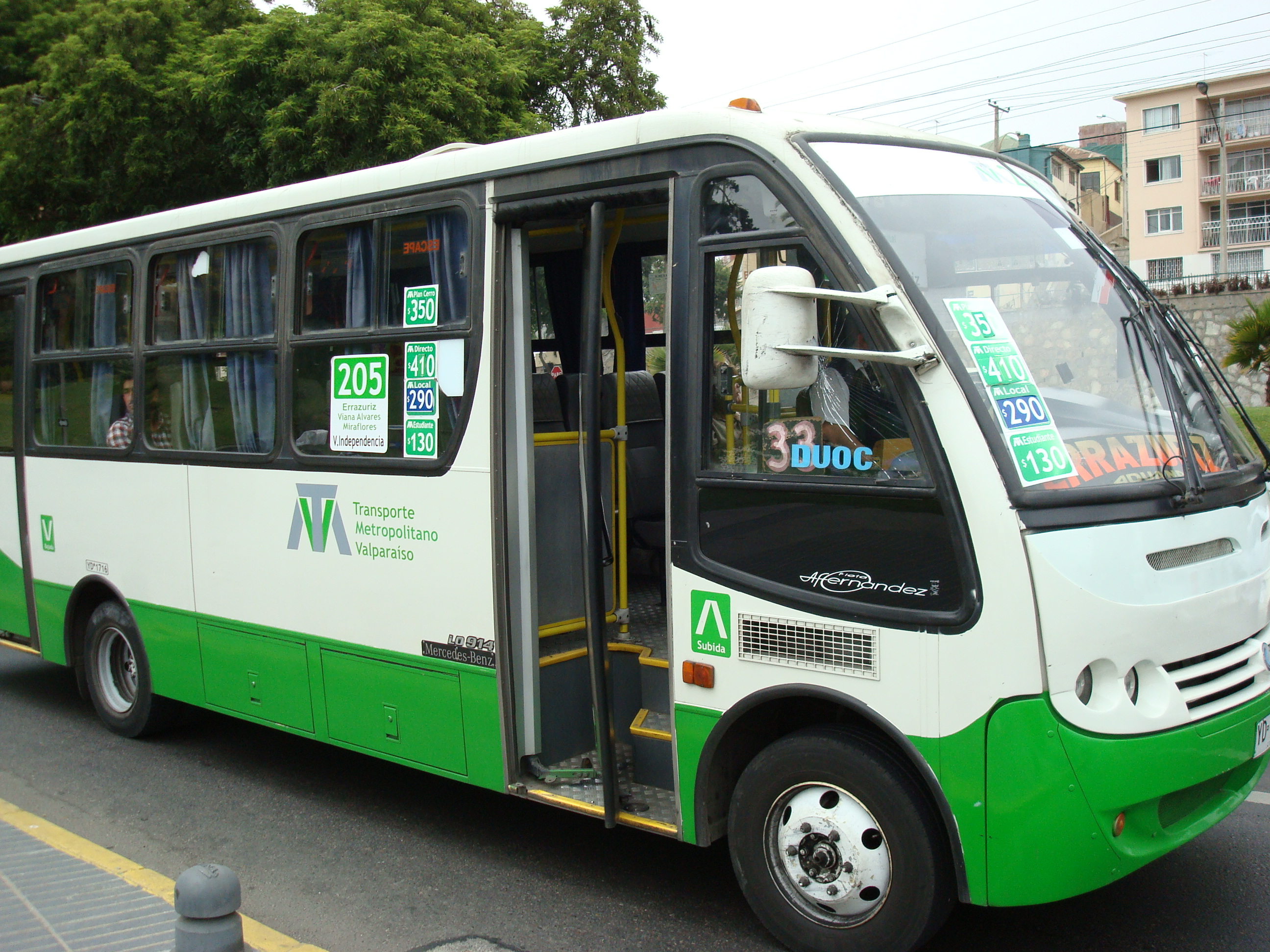
Bus of Metropolitan Transport Valparaíso in 2007

The route used to get from Santiago to Vina del Mar is the Route CH-68 or Pacific Highway, which connects the capital to the city of Valparaíso.

The main routes connecting the city with other municipalities of Gran Valparaíso are:

- Avenida España, which connects Valparaíso with Viña.
- The Troncal and Troncal Norte Roads, link Viña with Quilpué and Villa Alemana.
- The Borgoño and Edmundo Eluchans avenues linking Reñaca Viña and Concon with the commune.
- The Way International and Southern Trunk Highway, allowing quick connection to and from the towns of the interior.

The busiest avenues of Viña del Mar, and virtually the entire Gran Valparaíso, are the main arteries in the community plan and the Población Vergara: Avenida San Martín, Avenida Libertad Quillota street, Viana-Alvares Avenue, Avenida 1 Norte, Avenida Benidorm (former Av. 15 Norte), Avenida Agua Santa, Avenida La Marina, Avenida Borgoño and Av. Jorge Montt (Las Salinas Rect). This because they absorb all the traffic of workers and students moving from other municipalities to their work and study sites located in the plan from Valparaíso.

==== Public transport ====
As of 6 January 2007 the Metropolitan Transportation Plan Greater Valparaíso was implemented, it allows the communes of Valparaíso, Viña del Mar, Concon, Quilpué and Villa Alemana to have an organized transportation system. Through the implementation of a GPS system, the companies concerned to each business unit can oversee throught the entire course its speed and frequency.

The Valparaíso Metro (formerly called "Merval") is the commuter rail system serving the urban conglomeration of Gran Valparaíso; it consists of one line, 43 kilometres (27 mi) long, serving 20 stations, that connects Viña del Mar with the neighboring cities of Valparaíso, Quilpué, Villa Alemana and Limache. It passes through Viña del Mar in a 5-kilometre (3.1 mi) underground stretch (from Miramar through Chorrillos stations) opened in 2005, after major upgrade works on the line.

== Education ==
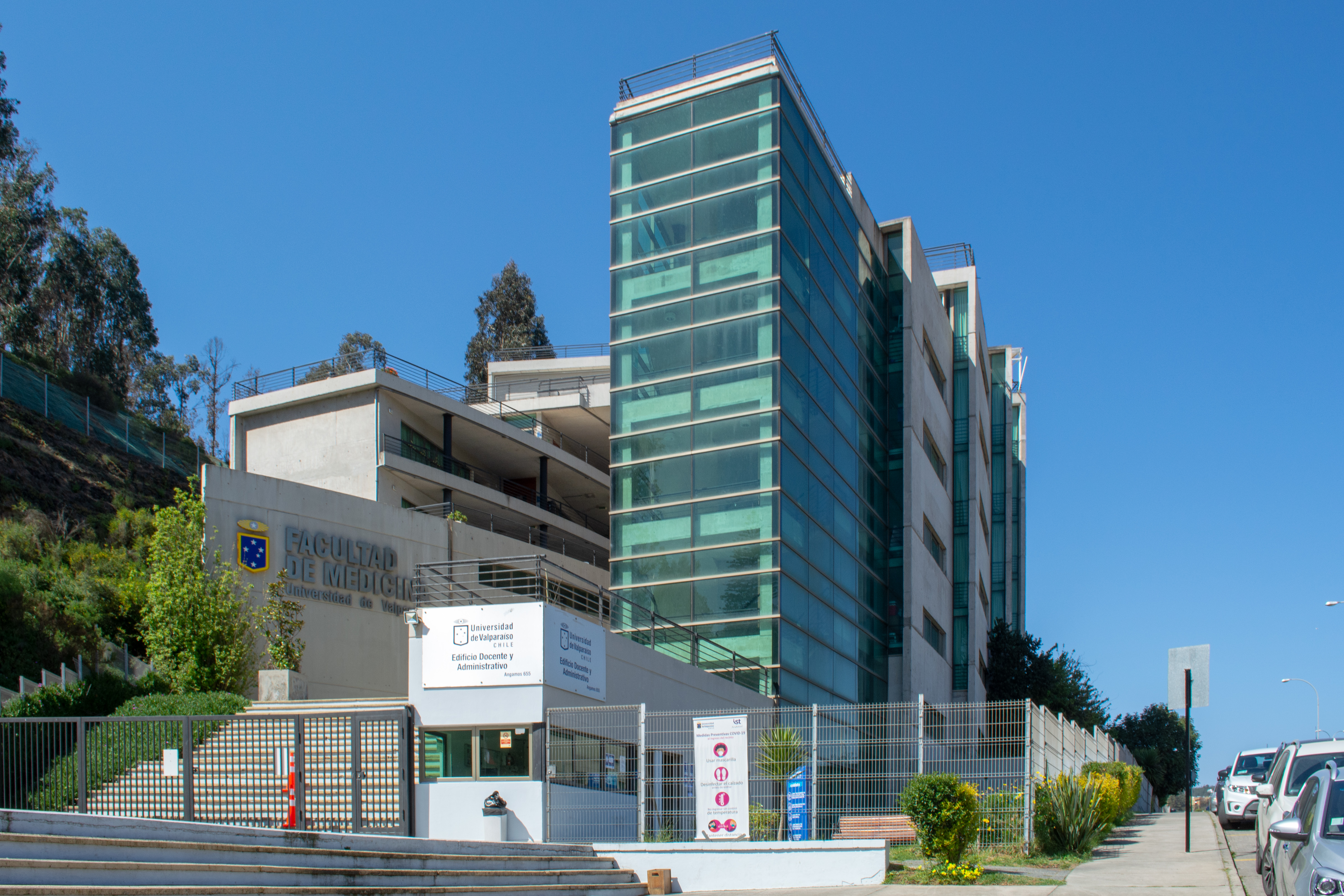
School of Medicine of the University of Valparaíso in Reñaca

Several higher education institutions, both public and private, are located in Viña del Mar. Some of them are:

- Pontifical Catholic University of Valparaíso with its Architecture (Recreo), Arts (Miraflores), Philosophy and Education (Sausalito) and History (Alvarez Avenue) campus
- University of Valparaíso has Business and Administration, Marine Sciences and Engineering faculties
- Viña del Mar University located in Rodelillo
- Andrés Bello University
- University of the Americas
- Adolfo Ibáñez University

The Chilean Navy also operates several technical schools and a planetarium in Las Salinas at the northwest edge of the city.

International schools in Viña del Mar:

- Scuola Italiana Arturo Dell' Oro
- Deutsche Schule Valparaíso, a German-language school
- The Mackay School, a boys-only English-language school of Scottish origins

== Notable people ==
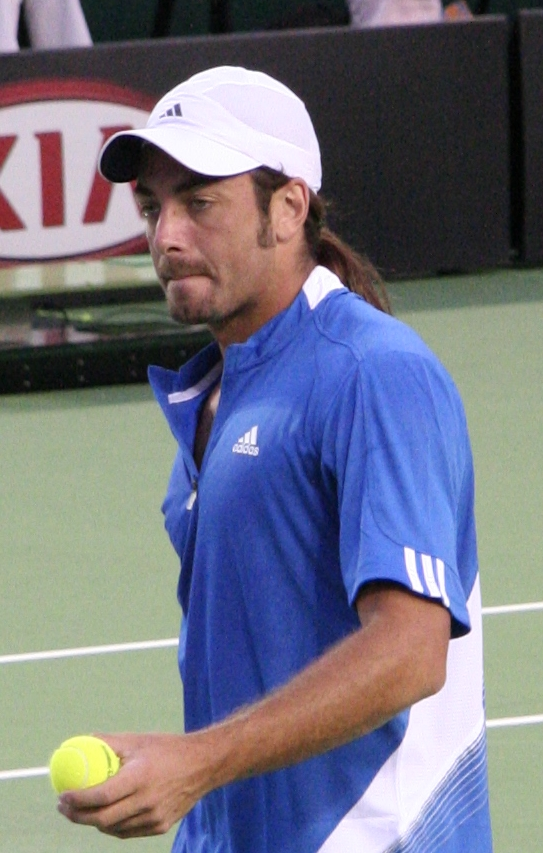
Nicolás Massú

The city is the birthplace of Mon Laferte, singer, songwriter, painter (4 Latin Grammys) and visual artist, Alberto Hurtado, the second Chilean Catholic saint and founder of the Hogar de Cristo (Home of Christ) foundation, writer María Luisa Bombal (author of La Ultima Niebla (The Last Fog)), former Chilean president Patricio Aylwin, Environment minister María Ignacia Benítez, handball player Marco Oneto, Olympic champion tennis player Nicolás Massú, world champion boxer Patricia Demick, Slayer vocalist/bassist Tom Araya, composer Sylvia Soublette, and the sculptor and performance artist Tamara Jacquin.

It was also the home of Philips CEO and wealthy businessman Cor Dillen, as well as Australian fashion model, actress and television presenter Pia Miller (formerly Loyola). Footballer, George Robledo of Newcastle United and Colo-Colo, was a long-term resident of the town.

== International relations ==
The city of Viña del Mar is home to a number of international relations institutions, such as the Department of Migration and International Police of the Investigations Police of Chile, the Office of International Relations, and the Migrant Office of the Municipality of Viña del Mar.

=== Internationalization in higher education ===
In terms of international relations and higher education, the main actors in Viña del Mar are the Directorate of International Cooperation of the Viña del Mar University, the Confucius Institute of the Santo Tomás University, and the Coordination of International Relations of the Viña del Mar campus of Andrés Bello University.

=== Consulates ===
- Germany (honorary consulate)
- Spain (consulate)
- Greece (honorary consulate)
- Lebanon (honorary consulate)
- Indonesia (honorary consulate)
- Morocco (honorary consulate)
- Monaco (honorary consulate)
- Netherlands (honorary consulate)
- Paraguay (honorary consulate)
- Syria (honorary consulate)

=== Sister cities/twin towns ===
Viña del Mar cooperates with:

- Rosario, Argentina
- Asunción, Paraguay
- Panama City, Panama
- San José, Costa Rica
- Guayaquil, Ecuador

== See also ==
- Viña del Mar International Song Festival

== Bibliography ==
- Castagneto G., Piero (2010). Una historia de Viña del Mar: La "hija de los rieles". Santiago. ISBN 978-956-284-717-9.
