= List of high schools in O'Higgins Region =

This is a list of high schools in Libertador General Bernardo O'Higgins Region, Chile, including those public (municipal), subsidized private, and private, organized by province and by city. This list includes former high schools.

== Cachapoal Province ==
=== Codegua ===
- Instituto Lautaro
- Liceo Municipal de Codegua

=== Coínco ===
- Liceo Municipal Luis Gregorio Valenzuela Lavín

=== Coltauco ===
- Escuela Agrícola San Vicente de Paul
- Escuela Berta Zamorano Lizana
- Instituto Monseñor Lecaros

=== Doñihue ===
- Colegio Los Cipreses (in Lo Miranda)
- Liceo Claudio Arrau León

=== Graneros ===
- Colegio Cristo Obrero
- Colegio Graneros
- Colegio Nuestra Señora
- Instituto Santa Teresa de Los Andes
- Liceo Profesor Misael Lobos Monroy

=== Las Cabras ===
- Colegio Mistral
- Liceo Francisco Antonio Encina Armanet

=== Machalí ===
- Colegio Arturo Prat
- Colegio La Cruz
- Colegio Real de Carén
- Colegio San Ignacio
- Escuela Básica Particular Diego Portales
- Liceo Machalí
- Trinity College
- Villa María College

=== Malloa ===
- Liceo Municipal Zoila Rosa Carreño

=== Mostazal ===
- Colegio Particular San Andrés
- Colegio Teresiano Juanita Fernández
- Liceo Elvira Sánchez de Garcés
- Liceo Alberto Hurtado

=== Olivar ===
- Liceo Técnico Municipal Olivar
- Olivar College

=== Peumo ===
- Colegio Alcalde Pedro Urbina
- Liceo Jean Buchaman de Larraín

=== Pichidegua ===
- Liceo Latinoamericano

=== Quinta de Tilcoco ===
- Escuela Particular Sagrado Corazón de Jesús
- Liceo Municipal República de Italia

=== Rancagua ===
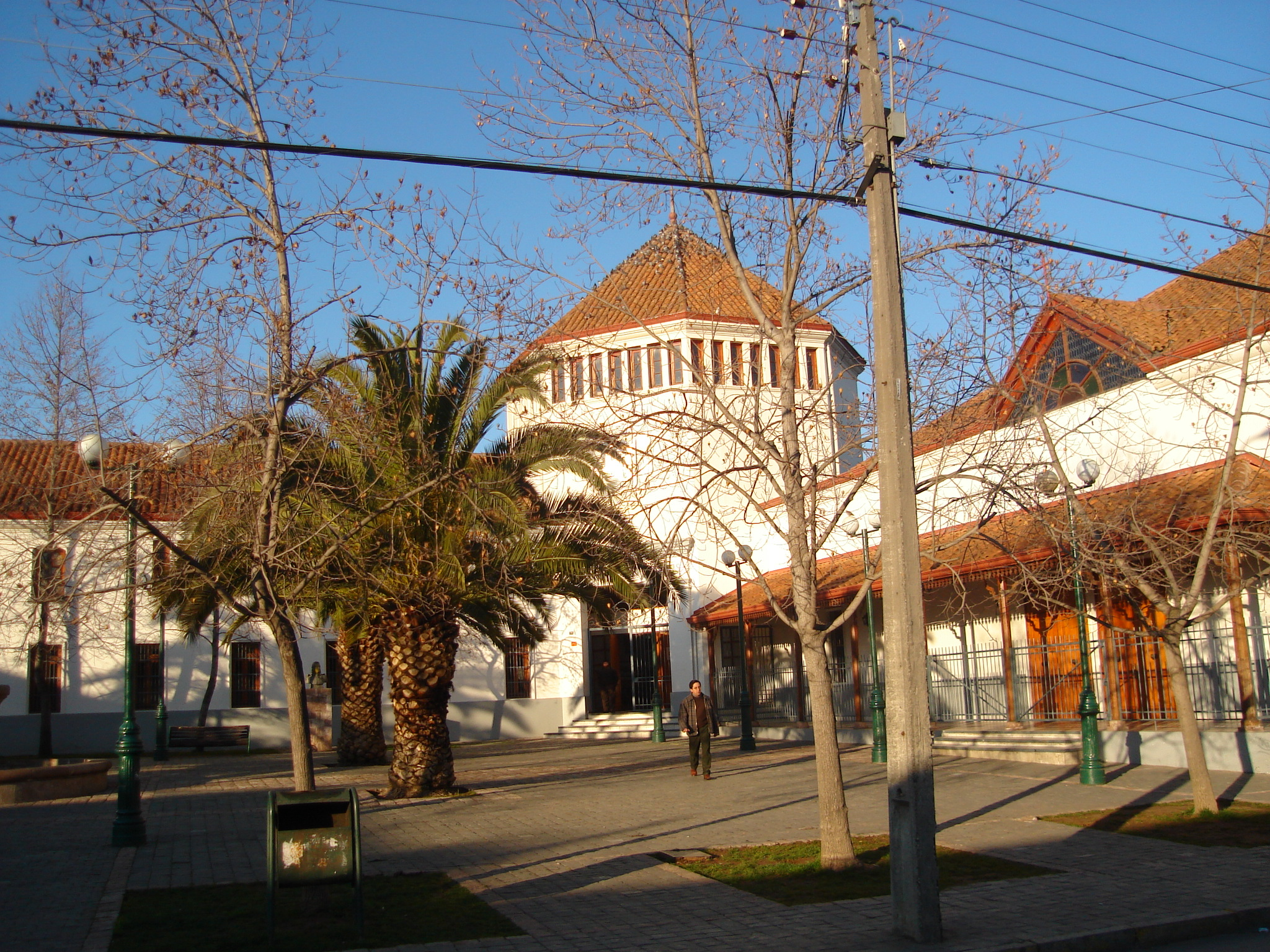
The Instituto O'Higgins de Rancagua.

- Colegio Alonso de Ercilla
- Colegio Bernardo O'Higgins
- Colegio Cuisenaire
- Colegio Ena Bellemans Montti
- Colegio Hispano-Chileno del Pilar
- Colegio Inglés Saint John
- Colegio Interamericano
- Colegio La Merced
- Colegio Las Américas
- Colegio La República
- Colegio Magister
- Colegio Monte Castello
- Colegio Particular Andrés Bello
- Colegio Particular Gabriela Mistral
- Colegio Quimahue
- Colegio Rancagua
- Colegio Sagrado Corazón
- Colegio San Sebastian School
- Colegio Santa María Goretti
- Colegio Tomás Guaglén
- Colegio Weber School (closed in 2012)
- Escuela Particular Niño Jesús de Praga
- Instituto Inglés Rancagua
- Instituto O'Higgins de Rancagua
- Instituto Regional de Educación
- Instituto Sagrado Corazón
- Instituto San Lorenzo
- Instituto San Andrés
- Instituto Sewell
- Liceo Bicentenario Óscar Castro Zúñiga
- Liceo Comercial Jorge Alessandri
- Liceo Comercial Diego Portales
- Liceo Ernesto Pinto Lagarrigue
- Liceo Industrial Presidente Pedro Aguirre Cerda
- Liceo José Victorino Lastarria
- Liceo Manuel de Salas
- Liceo María Luisa Bombal
- Liceo Técnico Profesional Santa Rosa
- Liceo Técnico Santa Cruz de Triana

=== Rengo ===
- Centro Educacional Asunción
- Colegio Antilén
- Colegio San Antonio del Baluarte
- Liceo Bicentenario Oriente
- Liceo Luis Urbina Flores
- Liceo Politécnico Tomás Marín de Póveda
- Liceo Saint Gregory's

=== Requínoa ===
- Liceo Requínoa
- Liceo San José

=== San Vicente de Tagua Tagua ===
- Colegio Almenar
- Colegio El Salvador
- Colegio España
- Colegio Nehuén
- Colegio Santa Inés
- Instituto San Vicente de Tagua Tagua
- Liceo Agrícola El Tambo

== Cardenal Caro Province ==
=== Litueche ===
- Liceo El Rosario

=== Marchigüe ===
- Instituto Cardenal Caro

=== Navidad ===
- Liceo Municipal Pablo Neruda

=== Paredones ===
- Liceo de Paredones
- Liceo Mercedes Urzúa Díaz

=== Pichilemu ===
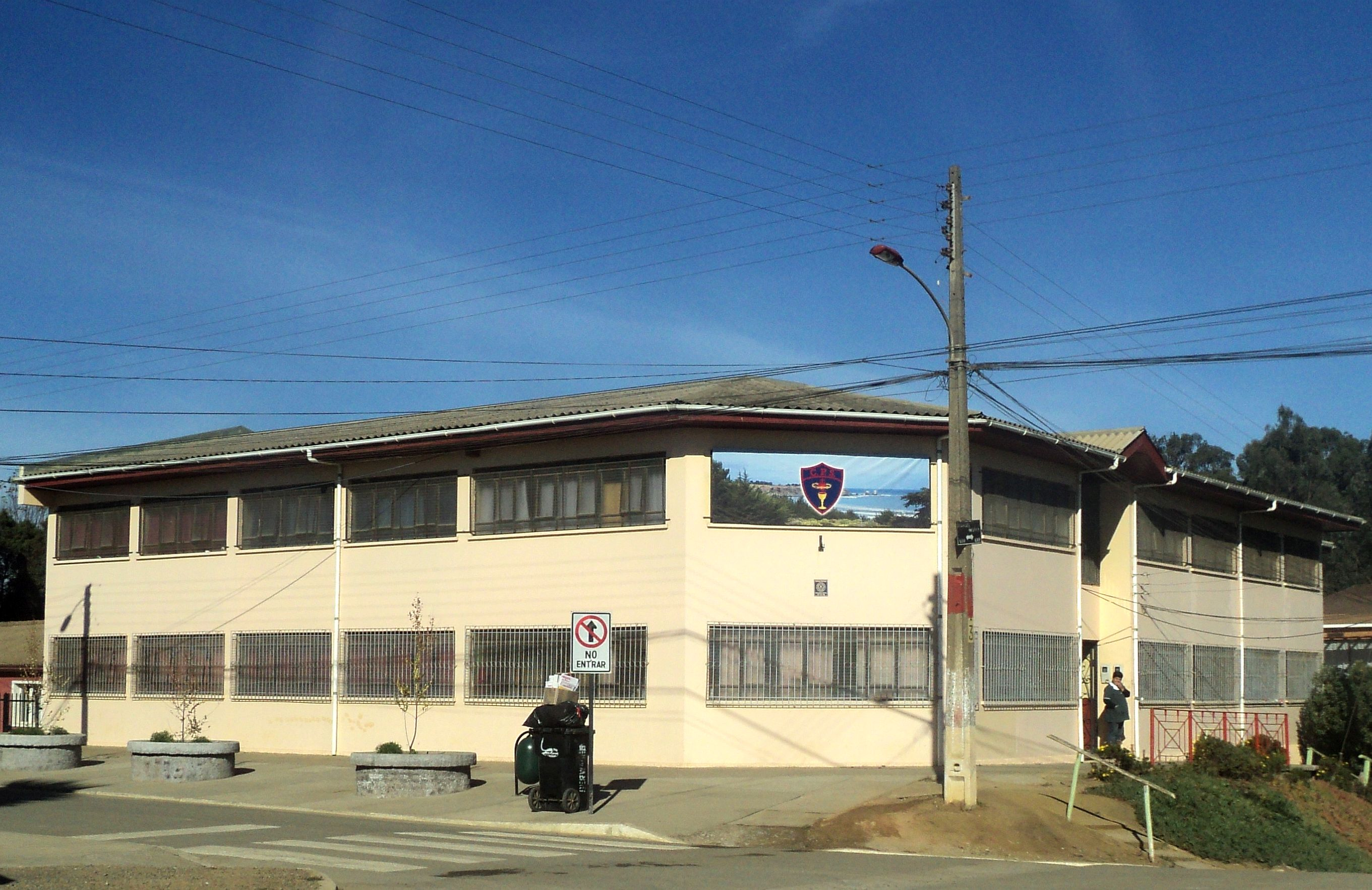
The Colegio de la Preciosa Sangre de Pichilemu in May 2012

- Colegio Charly's School
- Colegio de la Preciosa Sangre de Pichilemu
- Liceo Agustín Ross Edwards

== Colchagua Province ==
=== Chépica ===
- Liceo Fermín del Real Castillo

=== Chimbarongo ===
- Colegio Chimbarongo
- Colegio San José de la Montaña
- Complejo Educacional de Chimbarongo
- Escuela Agrícola Don Gregorio
- Escuela Agrícola Las Garzas

=== Lolol ===
- Liceo de Lolol

=== Nancagua ===
- Liceo Juan Pablo II
- Liceo Particular Cardenal Raúl Silva Henríquez

=== Palmilla ===
- Escuela Municipal San José del Carmen

=== Peralillo ===
- Liceo Víctor Jara

=== Placilla ===
- Escuela San Francisco de Placilla

=== San Fernando ===
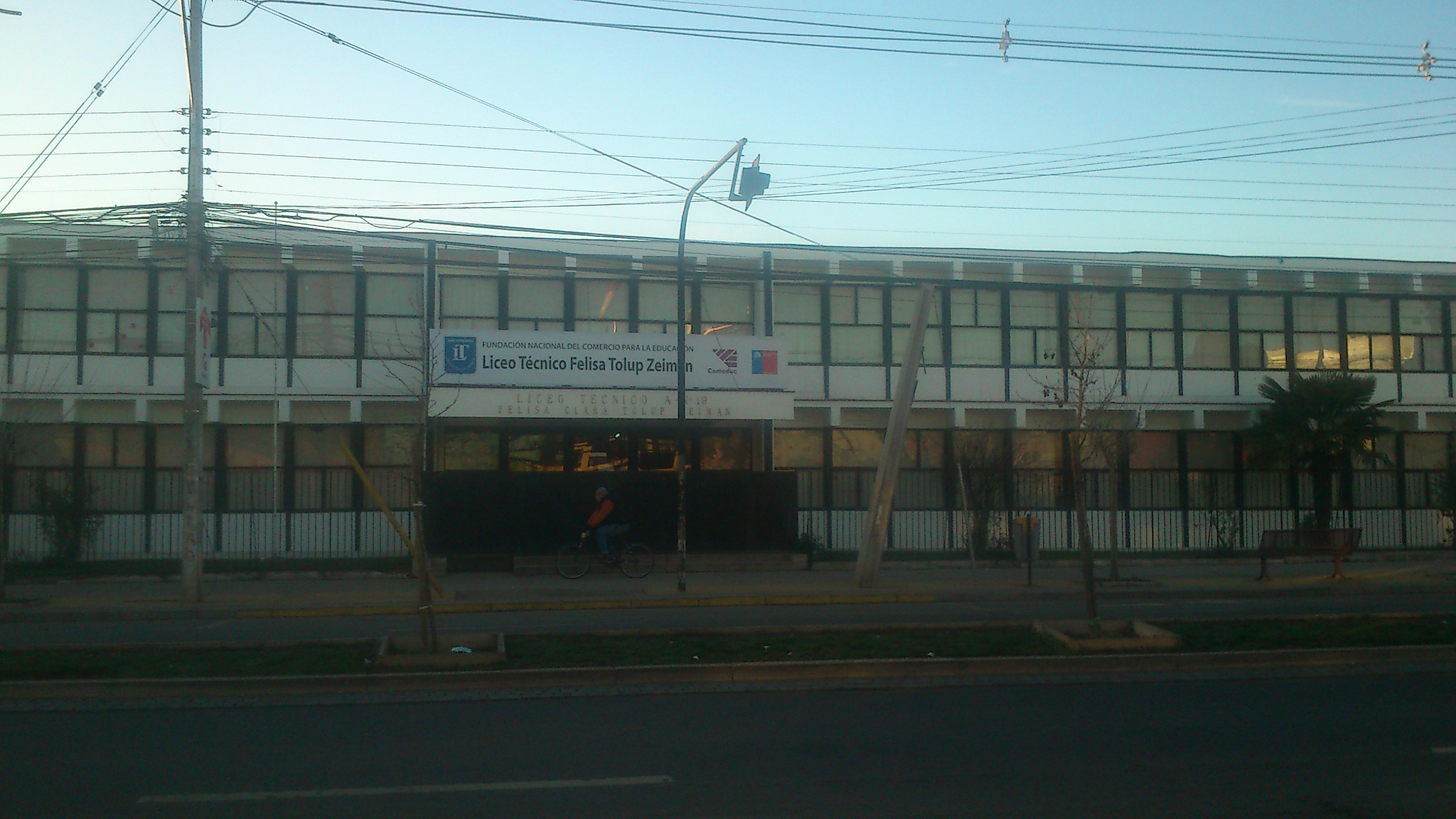
Liceo Técnico Felisa Tolup Zeiman in San Fernando, on 7 July 2012

- British College
- Colegio Arrayanes
- Colegio El Real
- Colegio Inmaculada Concepción
- Colegio Particular Subvencionado San Esteban
- Colegio Valle de Colchagua
- Complejo Educacional Las Araucarias
- Instituto Comercial Alberto Valenzuela Llanos
- Instituto Hans Christian Andersen
- Instituto San Fernando
- Liceo Agrícola El Carmen de San Fernando
- Liceo Coeducacional José Gregorio Argomedo
- Liceo de Niñas Eduardo Charme
- Liceo Industrial de San Fernando
- Liceo Neandro Schilling
- Liceo Técnico Felisa Clara Tolup Zeiman
- San Fernando College

=== Santa Cruz ===
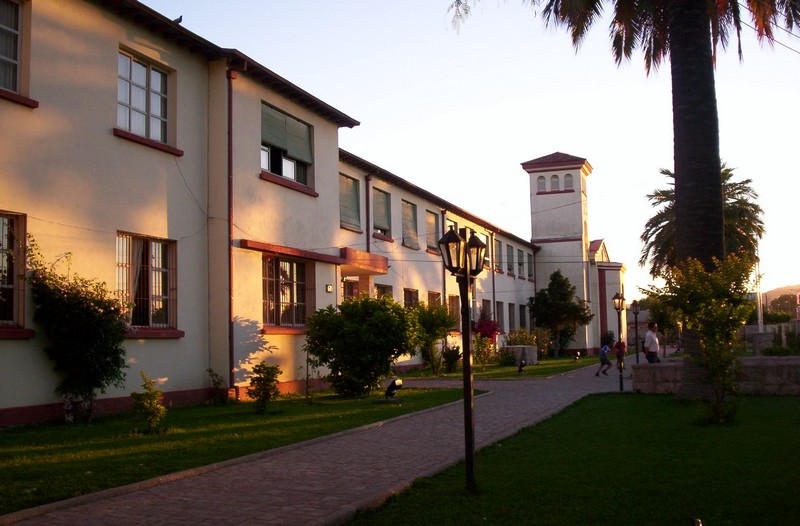
Façade of the Instituto Regional Federico Errázuriz in May 2007

- Colegio Evelyn's School
- Colegio Manquemávida
- Colegio Santa Cruz de Unco
- Instituto Regional Federico Errázuriz
- Liceo María Auxiliadora
- Instituto Politécnico Santa Cruz
- Liceo Santa Cruz
