= List of schools in Cardenal Caro =

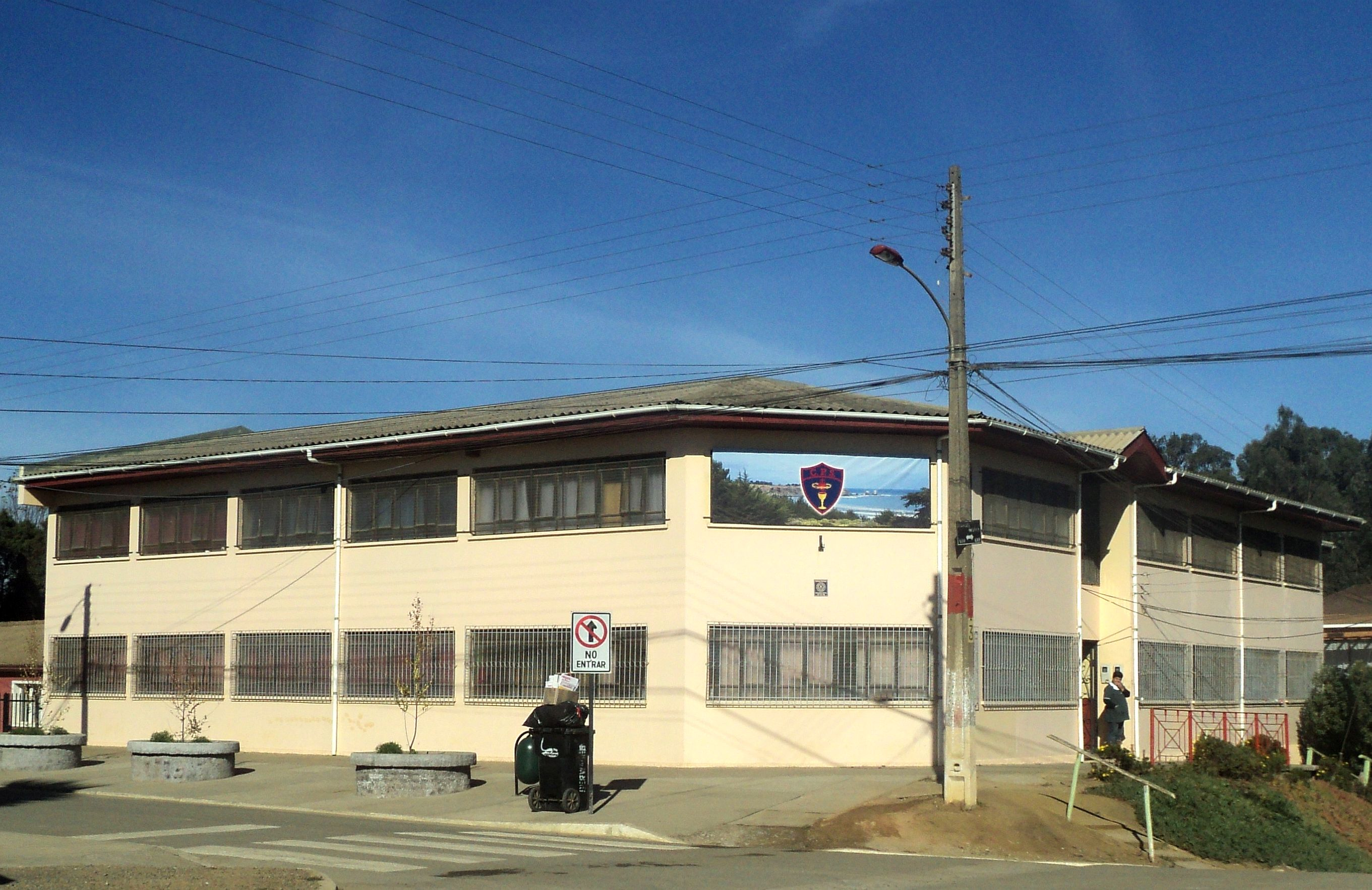
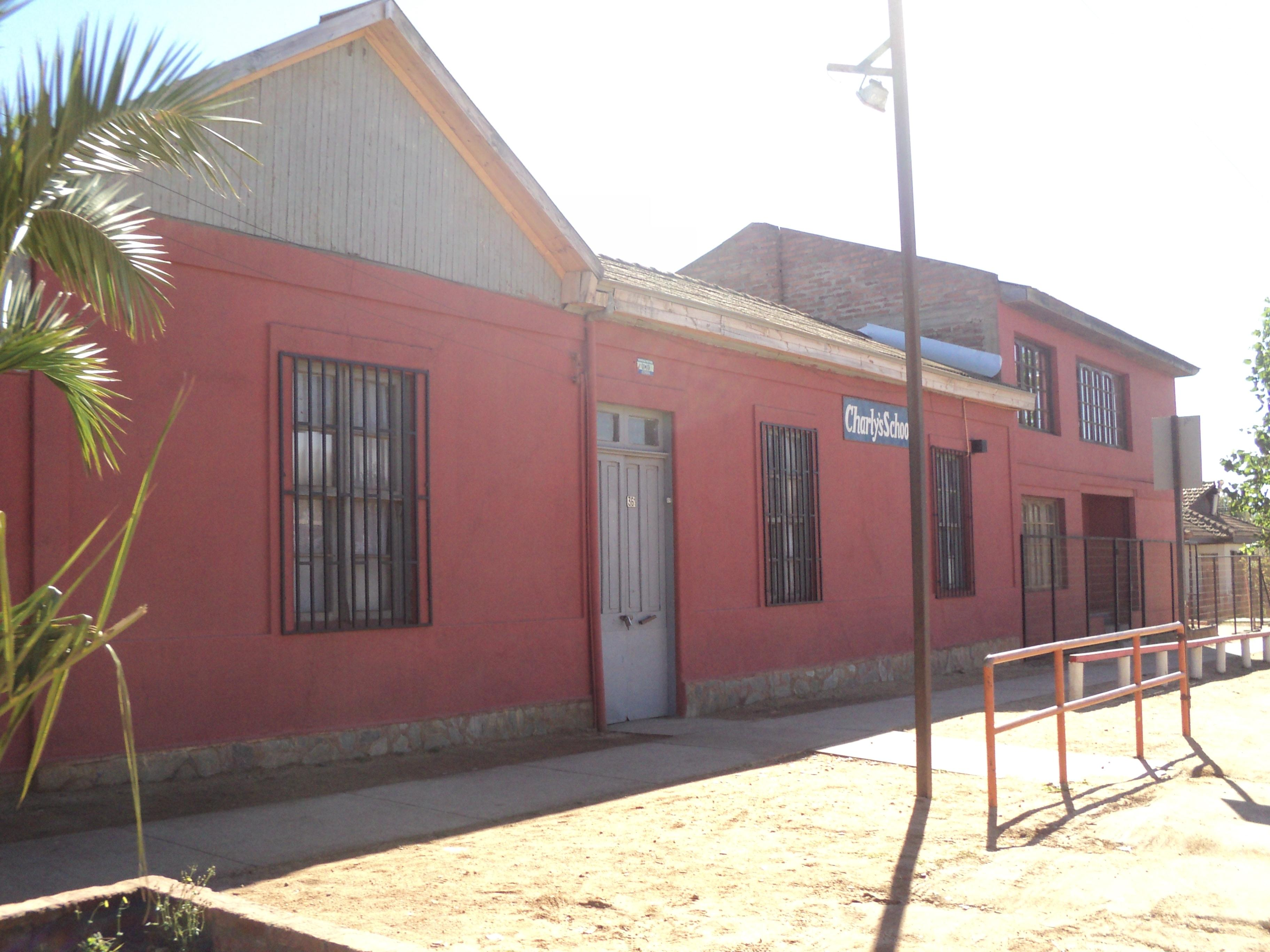
Colegio de la Preciosa Sangre (left) and Colegio Charly's School (right), both from Pichilemu, are among the semi-private schools in Cardenal Caro.

There are sixty-two schools in Cardenal Caro, one of the three provinces of Libertador General Bernardo O'Higgins Region in Chile. The province contains several primary schools and eight secondary schools. All schools in Cardenal Caro are municipal (owned by the government of their respective communes) except seven, including the Colegio de la Preciosa Sangre de Pichilemu, the Colegio Charly's School and the Instituto Railef, which are semi-private (subsidized by the state). Most schools are located in rural areas, while twenty are located in urban areas. All of them are coeducational.

Students in Chilean schools begin their formal education in prekínder between the ages of two and five. Primero básico is the first grade of primary education, which lasts until octavo básico (eighth grade). Students begin their secondary education in primero medio (ninth grade), and graduate in cuarto medio (twelfth grade).

In 2010, there were seventy-eight schools in Cardenal Caro, with 7,400 students in total. As of 2020, the number of students in the province slightly increased to 7,724. The Liceo Agustín Ross Edwards from Pichilemu has the most students, with 660, and is followed by the Colegio de la Preciosa Sangre, also from Pichilemu, with 541, Escuela Cardenal Raúl Silva Henríquez from Litueche, with 538, and the Colegio Divino Maestro, from the provincial capital, with 416.

== Schools ==
The enrollments given here are based on figures from the 2020 school year provided by the Ministry of Education. The number given in the last column corresponds to the database number (Rol de Base de Datos – RBD) for each school, provided by the Ministry of Education, and links to their respective page on the Más Información, Mejor Educación (MIME) website, which includes, among other things, information on the educational establishments' administrative staff, ranks per scores in the Sistema de Medición de Calidad de la Educación (Education Quality Measurement System – SIMCE) and Prueba de Selección Universitaria (University Selection Test – PSU) tests, and extracurricular activities. Thirty-nine schools without students are not included.

Name	Years	Commune	Authority	Enrollment	Website	RBD
Escuela Guadalao	1–8	La Estrella	Municipal	5	—	2698 (Archive)
Escuela Profesora Mónica Silva Gómez	Prekínder–8	La Estrella	Municipal	312	—	2694 (Archive)
Escuela Santa Rosa de La Aguada	1–8	La Estrella	Municipal	33	—	2700 (Archive)
Escuela Cardenal Raúl Silva Henríquez	Prekínder–8	Litueche	Municipal	538	—	40078 (Archive)
Escuela de Lenguaje Diego Duble Urrutia	Middle major-Kínder	Litueche	Semi-private	80		16861 (Archive)
Escuela Los Briones	1–8	Litueche	Municipal	3	—	2723 (Archive)
Escuela Matancilla	1–8	Litueche	Municipal	13	—	2685 (Archive)
Escuela Paso del Soldado	1–8	Litueche	Municipal	4	—	2687 (Archive)
Escuela Pulin	Prekínder–8	Litueche	Municipal	107	—	2686 (Archive)
Escuela Quelentaro	Prekínder–8	Litueche	Municipal	169	—	2682 (Archive)
Escuela Manquehua	1–8	Litueche	Municipal	13	—	2692 (Archive)
Liceo El Rosario	9–12	Litueche	Municipal	251		2681 (Archive)
Escuela América	Prekínder–8	Marchigüe	Municipal	347	—	15526 (Archive)
Escuela El Parque	1–8	Marchigüe	Municipal	17	—	2704 (Archive)
Escuela El Sauce	1–8	Marchigüe	Municipal	26	—	2703 (Archive)
Escuela Especial de Lenguaje Remolinos	Middle major-Kínder	Marchigüe	Semi-private	77	—	15846 (Archive)
Escuela La Quebrada	1–8	Marchigüe	Municipal	15	—	2702 (Archive)
Escuela Lo Marchant	1–8	Marchigüe	Municipal	13	—	2706 (Archive)
Escuela Nobeles de Chile	Prekínder–8	Marchigüe	Municipal	186	—	2707 (Archive)
Escuela Pailimo	Prekínder–8	Marchigüe	Municipal	108	—	2708 (Archive)
Escuela San Miguel de Viluco	1–8	Marchigüe	Municipal	13	—	2711 (Archive)
Liceo Instituto Cardenal Caro	9–12	Marchigüe	Municipal	187	—	2701 (Archive)
Escuela Trinidad	1–8	Marchigüe	Municipal	4	—	2705 (Archive)
Escuela Confederación Helvética	1–8	Navidad	Municipal	226	—	2664 (Archive)
Escuela La Boca de Rapel	1–8	Navidad	Municipal	34	—	2666 (Archive)
Colegio Divina Gabriela	Prekínder–8	Navidad	Municipal	178	—	2658 (Archive)
Escuela María Williams	1–8	Navidad	Municipal	11	—	2678 (Archive)
Escuela El Manzano	1–8	Navidad	Municipal	10	—	2661 (Archive)
Escuela Francisco Chávez Cifuentes	Prekínder–8	Navidad	Municipal	211	—	2660 (Archive)
Escuela Padre Alberto Hurtado	1–8	Navidad	Municipal	15	—	2673 (Archive)
Liceo Pablo Neruda	7–12	Navidad	Municipal	355		2657 (Archive)
Escuela La Aguada	1–8	Navidad	Municipal	33	—	2675 (Archive)
Escuela Puertecillo	1–8	Navidad	Municipal	15	—	15569 (Archive)
Escuela Albertina Valenzuela Toledo	Prekínder–8	Paredones	Municipal	62	—	2717 (Archive)
Escuela Esmeralda	1–8	Paredones	Municipal	5	—	2727 (Archive)
Escuela Especial de Lenguaje Newen	Middle major-Kínder	Paredones	Semi-private	68	—	15856 (Archive)
Escuela Las Carmelitas	Prekínder–8	Paredones	Municipal	13	—	2728 (Archive)
Escuela Lo Valdivia	Prekínder–8	Paredones	Municipal	11	—	2725 (Archive)
Escuela Los Copihues del Calvario	1–8	Paredones	Municipal	6	—	2722 (Archive)
Escuela Luis Artemón Pérez A.	1–8	Paredones	Municipal	6	—	2719 (Archive)
Escuela San Pedro de Alcántara	Prekínder–8	Paredones	Municipal	54	—	2716 (Archive)
Escuela Santa Ana de La Población	Prekínder–8	Paredones	Municipal	12	—	2721 (Archive)
Escuela Unión de Mujeres Americanas	Prekínder–8	Paredones	Municipal	119	—	2714 (Archive)
Escuela Villa San Pedro	Prekínder–8	Paredones	Municipal	29	—	2637 (Archive)
Escuela Mercedes Urzúa Díaz	Prekínder–10	Paredones	Municipal	277	—	2715 (Archive)
Liceo Mirella Catalán Urzúa	9–12	Paredones	Municipal	147	—	15808 (Archive)
Escuela El Cardal	1–8	Paredones	Municipal	1	—	2724 (Archive)
Escuela Ciruelos	1–8	Pichilemu	Municipal	2	—	2652 (Archive)
Colegio Charly's School	Prekínder–12	Pichilemu	Semi-private	353		15522 (Archive)
Colegio Libertadores	1–8	Pichilemu	Municipal	267	—	2654 (Archive)
Colegio de la Preciosa Sangre	Prekínder–12	Pichilemu	Semi-private	535		2656 (Archive)
Escuela Alto Ramírez	1–8	Pichilemu	Municipal	8	—	2639 (Archive)
Escuela Cáhuil	1–8	Pichilemu	Municipal	145	—	2650 (Archive)
Escuela Digna Camilo Aguilar	Prekínder–8	Pichilemu	Municipal	363	—	11261 (Archive)
Colegio Divino Maestro	Prekínder–8	Pichilemu	Municipal	416	—	15770 (Archive)
Escuela Especial Diferencial San Andrés	Middle major-Prekínder	Pichilemu	Semi-private	29	—	15791 (Archive)
Escuela Espinillo	1–8	Pichilemu	Municipal	6	—	2655 (Archive)
Escuela La Aguada	1–8	Pichilemu	Municipal	13	—	2646 (Archive)
Escuela Padre Alberto Hurtado Cruchaga	1–8	Pichilemu	Municipal	20	—	2643 (Archive)
Escuela Cardonal de Panilonco	1–8	Pichilemu	Municipal	29	—	11283 (Archive)
Escuela Pueblo de Viudas	1–8	Pichilemu	Municipal	170	—	2636 (Archive)
Liceo Agustín Ross Edwards	9–12	Pichilemu	Municipal	535		2635 (Archive)
Escuela Cóguil	1–8	Pichilemu	Municipal	5	—	2642 (Archive)
Escuela Rodeíllo	1–8	Pichilemu	Municipal	4	—	2647 (Archive)
Colegio de Lenguaje San Agustín	Middle major-Kínder	Pichilemu	Semi-private	87	—	15713 (Archive)
Instituto Railef	Prekínder–8	Pichilemu	Semi-private	195	—	20330 (Archive)
Colegio de Lenguaje Railef	Prekínder–8	Pichilemu	Semi-private	118	—	15713 (Archive)
