= Escuela Agrícola Don Gregorio =

Coordinates: 34.78453°S 71.04280°W

- Chimbarongo, Chile

Information
- Type: High school

Escuela Agrícola Don Gregorio (English: Don Gregorio Agricultural School) is a Chilean high school located in Chimbarongo, Colchagua Province, Chile.
