= Peumo =

- City and Commune
- Flag Coat of arms Map of Peumo commune in the O'Higgins Region Location in Chile
- Coordinates (city): 34°23′46″S 71°10′10″W
- Country: Chile
- Region: O'Higgins Region
- Province: Cachapoal Province

Government
  - Type: Municipality
  - Alcalde: Carlos Aliaga

Area
  - Total: 153.1 km^{2} (59.1 sq mi)
- Elevation: 168 m (551 ft)

Population (2012 Census)
  - Total: 14,112
  - Density: 92.18/km^{2} (238.7/sq mi)
  - Urban: 7,628
  - Rural: 6,320

Sex
  - Men: 7,128
  - Women: 6,820
- Area code: (+56) 72
- Website: Municipality of Peumo

Peumo is a Chilean city and commune in Cachapoal Province, O'Higgins Region. It is believed that Peumo was named for the vast amount of Cryptocarya alba, or Peumo trees, that grow there.

== Demographics ==
According to the 2002 census of the National Statistics Institute, Peumo spans an area of 153.1 km^{2} (59 sq mi) and has 13,948 inhabitants (7,128 men and 6,820 women). Of these, 7,628 (54.7%) lived in urban areas and 6,320 (45.3%) in rural areas. The population grew by 8.6% (1,105 persons) between the 1992 and 2002 censuses.

== Administration ==
As a commune, Peumo is a third-level administrative division of Chile administered by a municipal council, headed by an alcalde who is directly elected every four years. The current alcalde is Carlos Aliaga.

Within the electoral divisions of Chile, Peumo is represented in the Chamber of Deputies by Alejandra Sepúlveda (PRI) and Javier Macaya (UDI) as part of the 34th electoral district, together with San Fernando, Chimbarongo, San Vicente, Pichidegua and Las Cabras. The commune is represented in the Senate by Andrés Chadwick Piñera (UDI) and Juan Pablo Letelier Morel (PS) as part of the 9th senatorial constituency (O'Higgins Region).
