= Colegio San José de la Montaña =

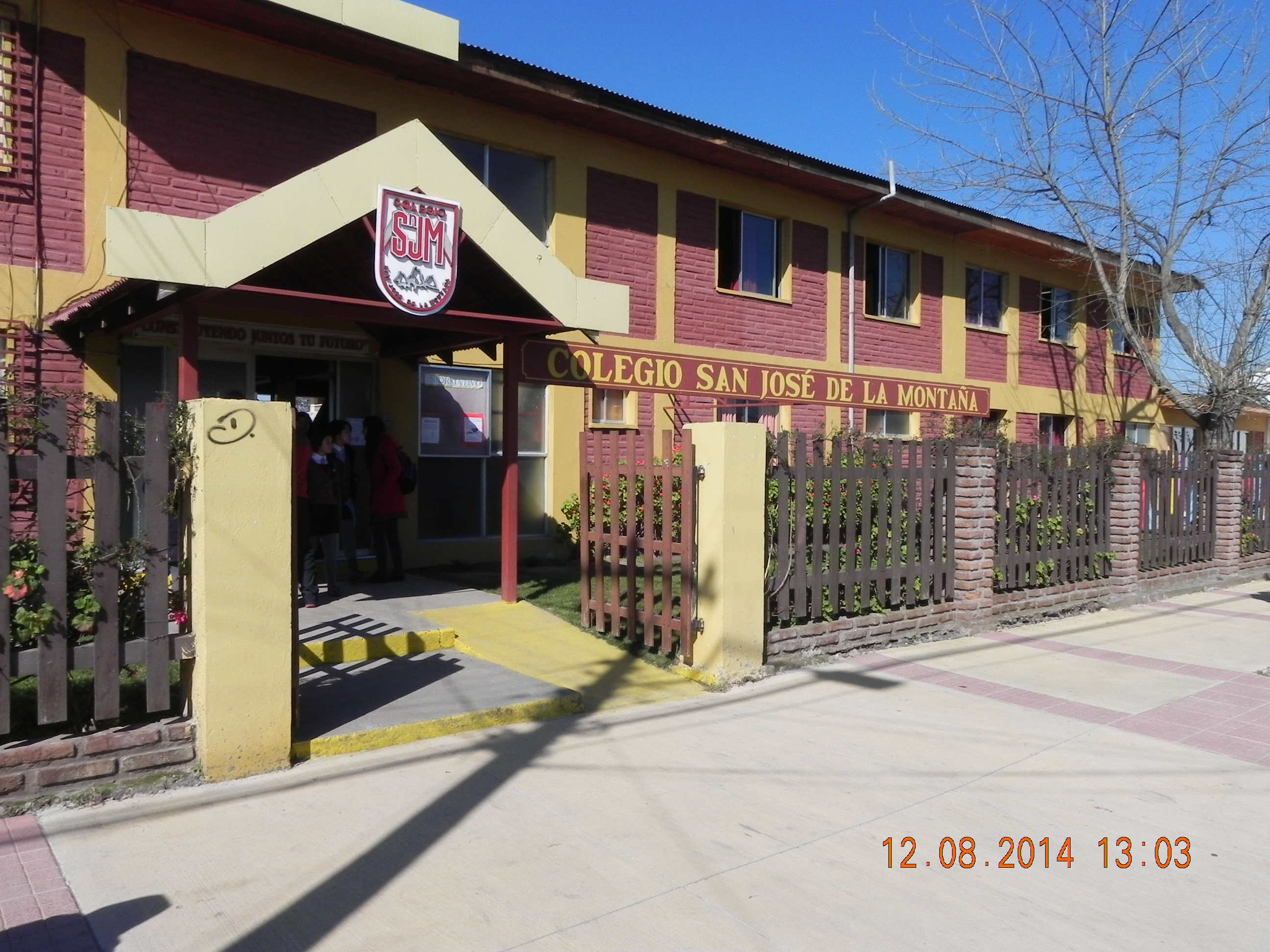
- Chimbarongo, Chile

Information
- Type: High school
- Established: 1997
- Founder: Luis Gonzalo Silva Sánchez
- Grades: K-12
- Website: https://colegiosanjosedelamontana.cl/

Colegio San José de la Montaña (English: San José de la Montaña School) is a Chilean high school located in Chimbarongo, Colchagua Province, Chile.
