= Escuela San Francisco de Placilla =

- Placilla, Chile

Information
- Type: High school

Escuela San Francisco de Placilla (English: San Francisco de Placilla School) is a Chilean high school located in Placilla, Colchagua Province, Chile.
