= Liceo Neandro Schilling =

Coordinates: 34°35′0.2″S 70°59′18.6″W

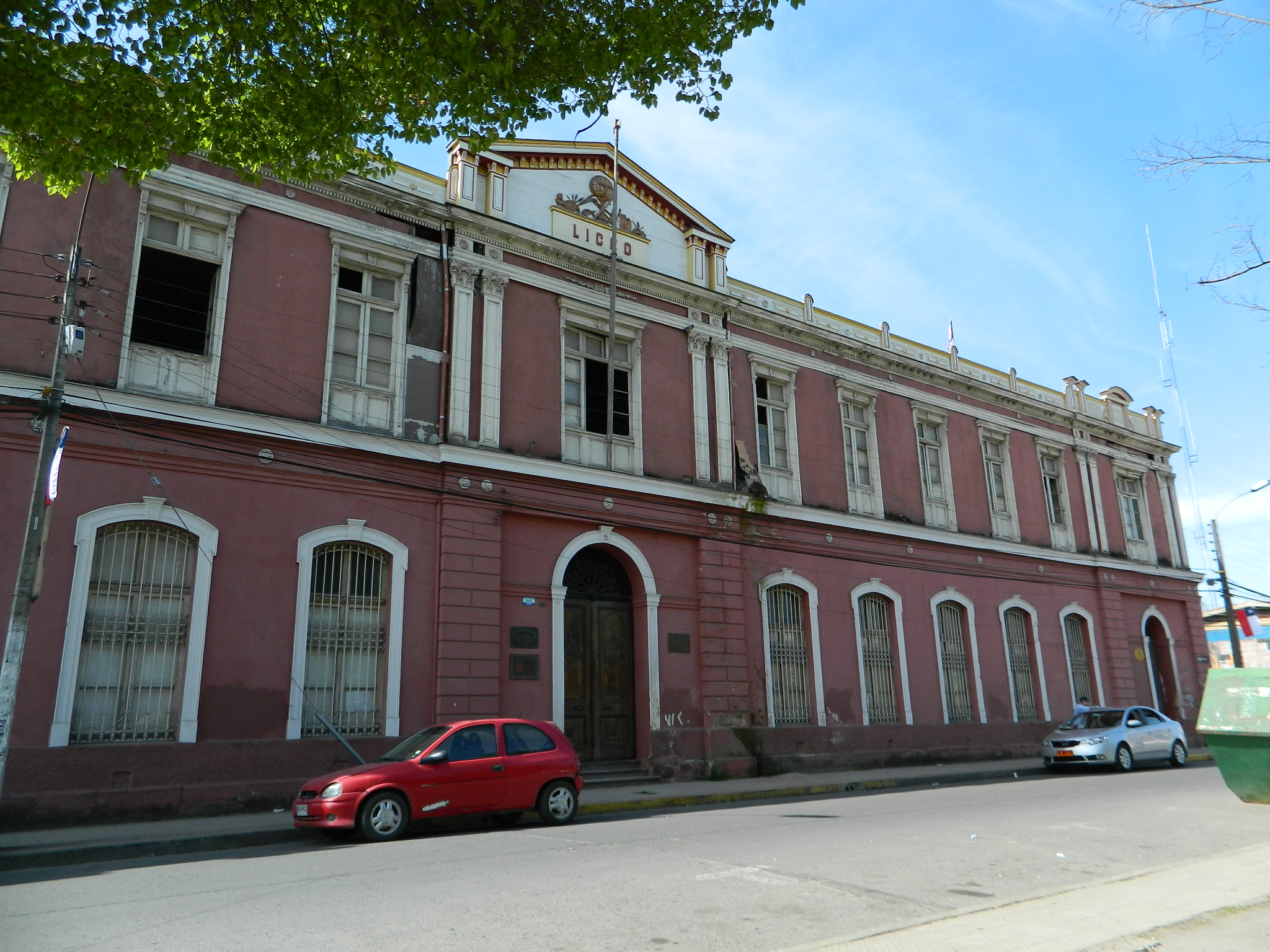
- San Fernando, Chile

Information
- Type: High school
- Established: 1846; 180 years ago

Liceo Neandro Schilling (English: Neandro Schilling High School) is a Chilean high school located in San Fernando, Colchagua Province, Chile. It was established in 1846.
