= Colegio Valle de Colchagua =

High school in Colchagua Province, Chile

Coordinates: 34.57980°S 71.00395°W

- San Fernando, Chile

Information
- Type: High school

Colegio Valle de Colchagua (English: Valle de Colchagua School) is a Chilean high school located in San Fernando, Colchagua Province, Chile.
