= Colegio El Salvador =

High school in Chile

Location
- San Vicente de Tagua Tagua, Chile
- 34.4397°S 71.0853°W

Information
- Type: High school
- Established: 1950s

Colegio El Salvador (English: El Salvador School) is a Chilean high school located in San Vicente de Tagua Tagua, Cachapoal Province, Chile.
