= Liceo Agrícola El Tambo =

Coordinates: 34.4771°S 70.9796°W

- San Vicente de Tagua Tagua, Chile

Information
- Type: High school

Liceo Agrícola El Tambo (English: El Tambo Agricultural High School) is a Chilean high school located in San Vicente de Tagua Tagua, Cachapoal Province, Chile.
