= Colegio Santa Inés =

High school in Cachapoal Province, Chile

- San Vicente de Tagua Tagua, Chile

Information
- Type: High school
- Established: March 16, 1965

Colegio Santa Inés (English: Santa Inés School) is a Chilean high school located in San Vicente de Tagua Tagua, Cachapoal Province, Chile. It was established in March 16, 1965.
