= Complejo Educacional de Chimbarongo =

- Chimbarongo, Chile

Information
- Type: High school
- Established: 1982

Complejo Educacional de Chimbarongo (English: Educational Complex of Chimbarongo) is a Chilean high school located in Chimbarongo, Colchagua Province, Chile.
