= Liceo Eduardo Charme =

Coordinates: 34.58256°S 70.98917°W

Liceo de Niñas Eduardo Charme
- San Fernando, Chile

Information
- Type: High school

Liceo de Niñas Eduardo Charme (English: Eduardo Charme Girls' High School) is a Chilean high school located in San Fernando, Colchagua Province, Chile.
