= Liceo Latinoamericano =

- Pichidegua, Chile

Information
- Type: High school
- Established: 1964

Liceo Latinoamericano (English: Latin American High School) is a Chilean high school located in Pichidegua, Cachapoal Province, Chile.
