= Liceo Industrial de San Fernando =

- San Fernando, Chile

Information
- Type: High school

Liceo Industrial de San Fernando (English: San Fernando Industrial High School) is a Chilean high school located in San Fernando, Colchagua Province, Chile.
