= Colegio San Esteban =

High school in Colchagua Province, Chile

Colegio Particular Subvencionado San Esteban
- San Fernando, Chile

Information
- Type: High school
- Established: 1998

Colegio Particular Subvencionado San Esteban (English: San Esteban Subsidized Particular School) is a Chilean high school located in San Fernando, Colchagua Province, Chile.
