= Colegio Inmaculada Concepción =

Private high school in Chile

- The school's volleyball team in 2011.
- San Fernando, Chile

Information
- Type: Private high school

Colegio Inmaculada Concepción (English: Inmaculada Concepción School) is a Chilean Private high school located in San Fernando, Colchagua Province, Chile.
