= Liceo Agrícola El Carmen =

Coordinates: 34.6070°S 70.9782°W

Liceo Agrícola El Carmen de San Fernando
- San Fernando, Chile

Information
- Type: High school

Liceo Agrícola El Carmen de San Fernando (English: El Carmen Agricultural High School from San Fernando) is a Chilean high school located in San Fernando, Colchagua Province, Chile.
