= Lecaros =

Lecaros may refer to:

== Places ==
- Instituto Monseñor Lecaros, Chilean high school located in Coltauco, Chile

== People with the surname Lecaros ==
- Alejandra Pérez Lecaros (born 1963), Chilean politician and lawyer
- Alexander Lecaros (born 1999), Peruvian footballer
- Juana Lecaros (1920–1993), Chilean visual artist and poet
- Magdalena Matte Lecaros (born 1950), Chilean businesswoman and politician
- Roberto Lecaros (1944–2022), Chilean jazz musician and composer
- Vicente Lecaro (born 1936), Ecuadorian footballer
