= Escuela Agrícola Las Garzas =

- Chimbarongo, Chile

Information
- Type: High school
- Established: 1960s

Escuela Agrícola Las Garzas (English: Las Garzas Agricultural School) is a Chilean high school located in Chimbarongo, Colchagua Province, Chile.
