= Pichidegua =

- Town and Commune
- Location of Pichidegua commune in O'Higgins Region Location in Chile
- Coordinates (town): 34°21′31″S 71°16′59″W
- Country: Chile
- Region: O'Higgins Region
- Province: Cachapoal Province

Government
  - Type: Municipality

Area
  - Total: 320 km^{2} (120 sq mi)
- Elevation: 146 m (479 ft)

Population (2012 Census)
  - Total: 18,225
  - Density: 57/km^{2} (150/sq mi)
  - Urban: 4,965
  - Rural: 12,791

Sex
  - Men: 9,208
  - Women: 8,548
- Time zone: UTC-4 (CLT)
  - Summer (DST): UTC-3 (CLST)
- Area code: (+56) 72
- Website: Municipality of Pichidegua

Pichidegua (Spanish pronunciation: [pitʃiˈðeɣwa]) is a Chilean commune and town in Cachapoal Province, O'Higgins Region.

== Demographics ==
According to the 2002 census of the National Statistics Institute, Pichidegua spans an area of 320 km^{2} (124 sq mi) and has 17,756 inhabitants (9,208 men and 8,548 women). Of these, 4,965 (28%) lived in urban areas and 12,791 (72%) in rural areas. The population grew by 7% (1,162 persons) between the 1992 and 2002 censuses.

== Administration ==
As a commune, Pichidegua is a third-level administrative division of Chile administered by a municipal council, headed by an alcalde who is directly elected every four years.

Within the electoral divisions of Chile, Pichidegua is represented in the Chamber of Deputies by Alejandra Sepúlveda (PRI) and Javier Macaya (UDI) as part of the 34th electoral district, together with San Fernando, Chimbarongo, San Vicente, Peumo and Las Cabras. The commune is represented in the Senate by Andrés Chadwick Piñera (UDI) and Juan Pablo Letelier Morel (PS) as part of the 9th senatorial constituency (O'Higgins Region).
