= Colegio El Real =

High school in Colchagua Province, Chile

- San Fernando, Chile

Information
- Type: High school

Colegio El Real (English: El Real School) is a Chilean high school located in San Fernando, Colchagua Province, Chile.
