= Colegio España =

High school in Cachapoal Province, Chile

- San Vicente de Tagua Tagua, Chile

Information
- Type: High school
- Established: 2003

Colegio España (English: España School) is a Chilean high school located in San Vicente de Tagua Tagua, Cachapoal Province, Chile. It was established in 2003.
