= Colegio Chimbarongo =

High school in Colchagua Province, Chile

- Chimbarongo, Chile

Information
- Type: High school

Colegio Chimbarongo (English: Chimbarongo School) is a Chilean high school located in Chimbarongo, Colchagua Province, Chile.
