= Instituto Comercial Alberto Valenzuela Llanos =

Coordinates: 34.57713°S 70.98900°W

- San Fernando, Chile

Information
- Type: High school
- Established: January 30, 1964

Instituto Comercial Alberto Valenzuela Llanos (English: Alberto Valenzuela Llanos Commercial Institute) is a Chilean high school located in San Fernando, Colchagua Province, Chile.

== History ==
The high school was founded on January 30, 1964.
