= Liceo Técnico Felisa Clara Tolup Zeiman =

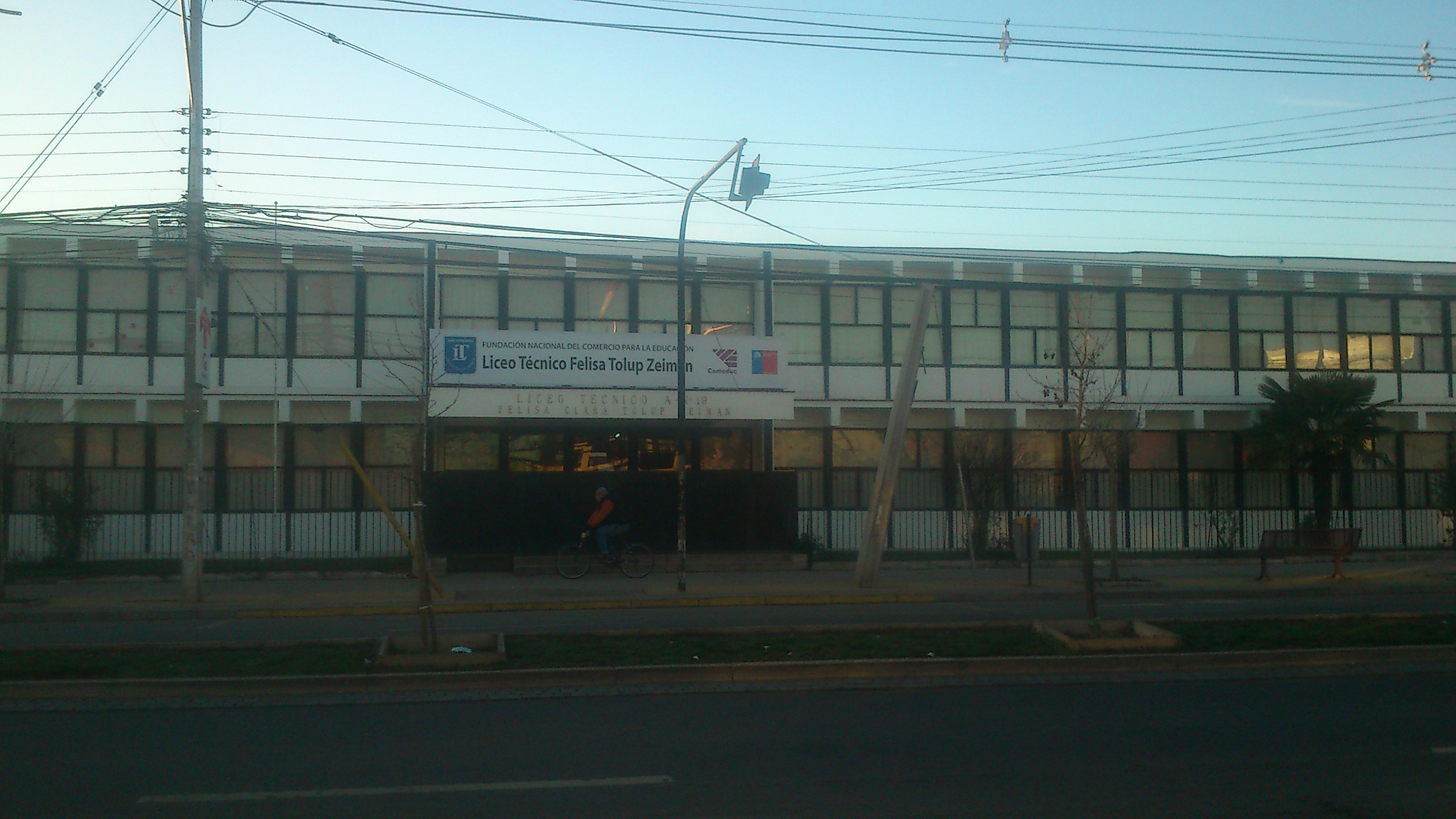
- Liceo Técnico Felisa Tolup Zeiman on 7 July 2012 Liceo Técnico Felisa Tolup Zeiman on 7 July 2012
- San Fernando, Chile

Information
- Type: High school

Liceo Técnico Felisa Clara Tolup Zeiman (English: Felisa Clara Tolup Zeiman Technical High School) is a Chilean high school located in San Fernando, Colchagua Province, Chile.
