= Liceo Jean Buchaman de Larraín =

Coordinates: 34.39768°S 71.16313°W

- Peumo, Chile

Information
- Type: High school

Liceo Jean Buchaman de Larraín (English: Jean Buchaman de Larraín High School) is a Chilean high school located in Peumo, Cachapoal Province, Chile.
