= Liceo José Gregorio Argomedo =

Liceo Coeducacional José Gregorio Argomedo
- San Fernando, Chile

Information
- Type: High school

Liceo Coeducacional José Gregorio Argomedo (English: José Gregorio Argomedo Coeducational High School) is a Chilean high school located in San Fernando, Colchagua Province, Chile.
