= Nehuén =

- Gender: Male
- Language: Mapuche language

Origin
- Meaning: strong

Nehuén (Spanish pronunciation: [neˈwen]) is a male given name of Mapuche origin meaning strong.

== People ==
- Nehuén Benedetti (born 2005), Argentine footballer
- Nehuen Montoya (born 1998), Argentine footballer
- Nehuén Paz (born 1993), Argentine footballer
- Nehuén Pérez (born 2000), Argentine footballer
- Nehuén Bazán (born 1999), Argentine cyclist
- Nehuen García (born 2001), Argentine footballer
- Nehuen Hernando (born 2000), Argentine field hockey player
- Nehuén Melita (born 1993), Argentine judoka

== Other uses ==
- Colegio Nehuén, high school located in San Vicente de Tagua Tagua, Chile
