= Complejo Educacional Las Araucarias =

- San Fernando, Chile

Information
- Type: High school

Complejo Educacional Las Araucarias (English: Las Araucarias Educational Complex) is a Chilean high school located in San Fernando, Colchagua Province, Chile.
