= Colegio Interamericano de Rancagua =

High school in Cachapoal Province, Chile

Coordinates: 34.15327°S 70.75377°W

Colegio Interamericano
- Rancagua, Chile

Information
- Type: High school

Colegio Interamericano (English: Inter American School) is a Chilean high school located in Rancagua, Cachapoal Province, Chile.
