= Liceo Industrial Presidente Pedro Aguirre Cerda =

Coordinates: 34.1691°S 70.7240°W

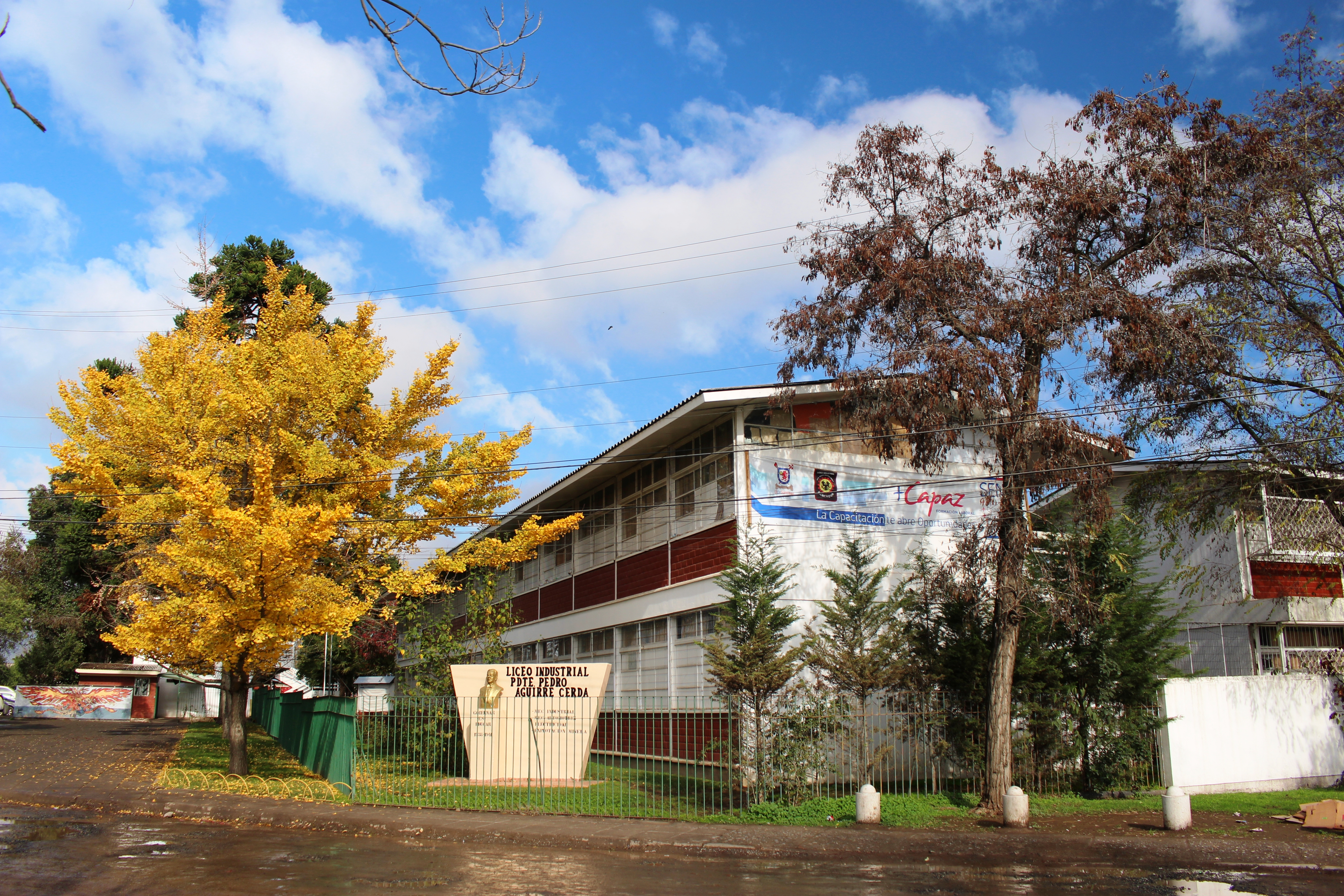
- Rancagua, Chile

Information
- Type: High school

Liceo Industrial Presidente Pedro Aguirre Cerda (English: President Pedro Aguirre Cerda Industrial High School) is a Chilean high school located in Rancagua, Cachapoal Province, Chile.
