= Colegio Nehuén =

High school in Cachapoal Province, Chile

Coordinates: 33.68706°S 70.91135°W

- San Vicente de Tagua Tagua, Chile

Information
- Type: High school
- Established: 1970s

Colegio Nehuén (English: Nehuén School) is a Chilean high school located in San Vicente de Tagua Tagua, Cachapoal Province, Chile.
