= Escuela Agrícola San Vicente de Paul =

Coordinates: 34.21414°S 70.99842°W

- Coltauco, Chile

Information
- Type: High school

Escuela Agrícola San Vicente de Paul (English: San Vicente de Paul Agricultural School) is a high school located in Coltauco, Cachapoal Province, Chile.

It was founded in Tobalaba, Santiago, Santiago Metropolitan Region in 1935, and on 1 May 1943 it began working at Coltauco.
