= Instituto Inglés Rancagua =

- Rancagua, Chile

Information
- Type: School
- Motto: Truth, Honor and Power
- Established: 1962
- Enrollment: 1181
- Colors: Red and Gray
- Website: institutoingles.cl

Instituto Inglés Rancagua (English: Rancagua English Institute) is a Chilean high school located in Rancagua, Cachapoal Province, Chile.
