= Liceo Claudio Arrau León =

- Doñihue, Chile

Information
- Type: High school

Liceo Claudio Arrau León (English: Claudio Arrau León High School) is a Chilean high school located in Doñihue, Cachapoal Province, Chile.
