= Liceo Bicentenario Alberto Hurtado =

Location
- Location in Mostazal
- Independencia 520; O'Higgins; San Francisco de Mostazal, Cachapoal; Chile
- Coordinates: 33.9748°S 70.7124°W

Information
- Type: High school
- Principal: Luis Arturo Orellana Miquel
- Enrollment: 416 (as of 2012)
- Website: lbahurtado.cl

Liceo Bicentenario de Excelencia Alberto Hurtado (Alberto Hurtado Bicentennial High School of Excellence, formerly known as Liceo Técnico Profesional Alberto Hurtado or Alberto Hurtado Technical-Professional High School) is a Chilean high school located in San Francisco de Mostazal, Cachapoal Province.

As of 2012, its principal is Luis Orellana Miquel, and it had 416 students.

== See also ==
- Education in Chile
