= Liceo Saint Gregory's =

Chilean high school

- Rengo, Chile

Information
- Type: High school
- Established: 1 March 2003

Liceo Saint Gregory's (Spanish, 'Saint Gregory's High School') is a Chilean high school located in Rosario, Rengo, Cachapoal Province, Chile. The school was created on 1 March 2003.
