= Liceo Juan Pablo II =

- Nancagua, Chile

Information
- Type: High school

Liceo Juan Pablo II (English: John Paul II High School) is a Chilean high school located in Nancagua, Colchagua Province, Chile.
