= Liceo Técnico Juan Hope Gantz =

Coordinates: 34.21370°S 70.81686°W

- Olivar, Chile

Information
- Type: High school

Liceo Técnico Juan Hope Gantz (English: Juan Hope Gantz Technical High School) is a Chilean high school located in Olivar, Cachapoal Province, Chile.
