= Liceo Víctor Jara =

- Peralillo, Chile

Information
- Type: High school
- Established: 1983

Liceo Víctor Jara (English: Víctor Jara High School) is a Chilean high school located in Peralillo, Colchagua Province, Chile. It was established in 1983.
