= Instituto Regional de Educación =

- Rancagua, Chile

Information
- Type: High school
- Established: March 1982

Instituto Regional de Educación (English: Regional Institute of Education) is a Chilean high school located in Rancagua, Cachapoal Province, Chile.
