= Liceo República de Italia =

Liceo Municipal República de Italia
- Quinta de Tilcoco, Chile

Information
- Type: High school

Liceo Municipal República de Italia (English: República de Italia Municipal High School) is a Chilean high school located in Quinta de Tilcoco, Cachapoal Province, Chile.
