= Colegio San Ignacio de Machalí =

High school in Chile

Colegio San Ignacio
- San Juan Ave. 212, Machalí, Chile

Information
- Type: Primary and secondary school
- Principal: Roxana Pérez Núñez
- Enrollment: 451 (2012)
- Website: Colegio San Ignacio

Colegio San Ignacio (English: San Ignacio School) is a Chilean high school located in Machalí, Cachapoal Province, Chile.

The school has 451 students as of 2012. Its principal is Roxana Pérez Núñez, the president of the parents' center (centro de padres) is Víctor Calderón, and the president of the students' center (centro de alumnos) is Amara Arroyo. It possesses an administrative staff and teachers of 62 people. Colegio San Ignacio was founded in 1991.
