= Liceo Luis Valenzuela Lavín =

Liceo Municipal Luis Gregorio Valenzuela Lavín
- Coínco, Chile

Information
- Type: High school
- Established: 1980s

Liceo Municipal Luis Gregorio Valenzuela Lavín (English: Luis Gregorio Valenzuela Lavín Municipal High School) is a Chilean high school located in Coínco, Cachapoal Province, Chile.
