= Colegio Manquemávida =

High school in Santa Cruz, Chile

- Santa Cruz, Chile

Information
- Type: High school

Colegio Manquemávida (English: Manquemávida School) is a Chilean high school located in Santa Cruz, Colchagua Province, Chile.
