= Colegio Graneros =

High school in Cachapoal Province, Chile

- Graneros, Chile

Information
- Type: High school

Colegio Graneros (English: Graneros School) is a Chilean high school located in Graneros, Cachapoal Province, Chile.
