= Liceo Municipal Zoila Rosa Carreño =

Coordinates: 34.43410°S 70.88415°W

Zoila Rosa Carreño High School
- Liceo Municipal Zoila Rosa Carreño
- Malloa, Chile

Information
- Type: High school
- Motto: Nuestras Comunidades Educativas, Trabajando Unidas por la Excelencia (Our Educational Communities, Working Together for Excellence)
- Established: 2003
- Head teacher: Mr. Cristián Frías González
- Enrollment: 320
- Website: liceoportezuelo.cl

Liceo Municipal Zoila Rosa Carreño (English: Zoila Rosa Carreño Municipal High School) is a Chilean high school located in Malloa, Cachapoal Province, Chile. It was established in 2003.
