= Liceo Luis Urbina Flores =

- Rengo, Chile

Information
- Type: High school
- Principal: 1885

Liceo Luis Urbina Flores (English: Luis Urbina Flores High School) is a Chilean high school located in Rengo, Cachapoal Province, Chile.
