= Colegio Andrés Bello (Rancagua) =

High school in Cachapoal Province, Chile

Coordinates: 34.1323°S 70.7506°W

Colegio Particular Andrés Bello
- Rancagua, Chile

Information
- Type: High school
- Established: February 11, 1981

Colegio Particular Andrés Bello (English: Andrés Bello Particular School) is a Chilean high school located in Rancagua, Cachapoal Province, Chile.
