= Liceo Politécnico Tomás Marín de Póveda =

Coordinates: 34.40936°S 70.86174°W

- Rengo, Chile

Information
- Type: High school

Liceo Politécnico Tomás Marín de Póveda (English: Tomás Marín de Póveda Politechnical High School) is a Chilean high school located in Rengo, Cachapoal Province, Chile.
