= Colegio San Antonio del Baluarte =

Elementary school in Chile

- Rengo, Chile

Information
- Type: Elementary school
- Established: 1981

Colegio San Antonio del Baluarte (English: School of St. Anthony the Bulwark) is a Chilean elementary school located in Rengo, Cachapoal Province, Chile. It was founded in 1981.
