= Evelyn's School =

Coordinates: 34.63585°S 71.37305°W

Colegio Evelyn's School
- Santa Cruz, Chile

Information
- Type: High school

Evelyn's School is a Chilean high school located in Santa Cruz, Colchagua Province, Chile.
