= Liceo Santa Cruz de Triana =

Coordinates: 34.15011°S 70.70988°W

Liceo Técnico Santa Cruz de Triana
- Rancagua, Chile

Information
- Type: High school

Liceo Técnico Santa Cruz de Triana (English: Santa Cruz de Triana Technical High School) is a Chilean high school located in Rancagua, Cachapoal Province, Chile.

The high school emphasizes abilities in arts, and sports: one of its students earned a gold medal at the national tournament Juegos Bicentenario, in the category of high jump.
