= Liceo Comercial Jorge Alessandri =

Coordinates: 34.16110°S 70.74161°W

Liceo Comercial B-34 Jorge Alessandri R.
- Rancagua, Chile

Information
- Type: High school

Liceo Comercial B-34 Jorge Alessandri R. (English: Jorge Alessandri Commercial High School) is a Chilean high school located in Rancagua, Cachapoal Province, Chile.
