= Colegio Mistral =

High school in Cachapoal Province, Chile

Coordinates: 34.28979°S 71.31320°W

- Las Cabras, Chile

Information
- Type: High school
- Established: 1998

Colegio Mistral (English: Mistral School) is a Chilean high school located in Las Cabras, Cachapoal Province, Chile. It was established in 1998.
