= Liceo María Auxiliadora =

Coordinates: 53.16053°S 70.90554°W

- Santa Cruz, Chile

Information
- Type: High school
- Established: March 1889

Liceo María Auxiliadora (English: Mary Help of Christians High School) is a Chilean high school located in Santa Cruz, Colchagua Province, Chile.

The school opened its doors in March 1889, with an enrollment of 13 students under the direction of Mother Angela Vallese.
