= Colegio Real de Carén =

High school in Cachapoal Province, Chile

- Machalí, Chile

Information
- Type: High school

Colegio Real de Carén (English: Real de Carén School) is a Chilean high school located in Machalí, Cachapoal Province, Chile.
