= Instituto Santa Teresa de Los Andes =

Coordinates: 34.07359°S 70.73038°W

- Graneros, Chile

Information
- Type: High school
- Website: institutosantateresa.cl

Instituto Santa Teresa de Los Andes (English: Santa Teresa de Los Andes Institute) is a Chilean high school located in Graneros, Cachapoal Province, Chile.
