= Colegio Antilén =

Private school in Chile

Coordinates: 34.40247°S 70.85583°W

Colegio Antilen
- Rengo, Chile

Information
- Type: Private School
- Motto: Niños Felices
- Established: 30 October 1995
- Website: colegioantilenrengo.cl

Colegio Antilen (English: Antilen School) is a private school in Rengo, in the Cachapoal Province of Chile which provides pre-basic, basic and secondary education.
