= Colegio Nuestra Señora =

High school in Cachapoal Province, Chile

Location
- Graneros, Chile
- Coordinates: 34.07056°S 70.72955°W

Information
- Type: High school
- Established: 1884

Colegio Nuestra Señora (English: Nuestra Señora School) is a Chilean high school located in Graneros, Cachapoal Province, Chile. It was founded in 1884 by the Congregation of the Sisters of the Holy Union of the Sacred Hearts.
