= Liceo Misael Lobos Monroy =

Liceo Profesor Misael Lobos Monroy
- Graneros, Chile

Information
- Type: High school
- Established: 1960s

Liceo Professor Misael Lobos Monroy (English: Teacher Misael Lobos Monroy High School) is a Chilean high school located in Graneros, Cachapoal Province, Chile.
