= Trinity College Rancagua =

Trinity College
- Machalí, Chile

Information
- Type: High school

Trinity College is a Chilean high school located in the Machalí-Rancagua conurbation, Cachapoal Province, Chile.
