= Colegio Tomás Guaglén =

High school in Cachapoal Province, Chile

- Rancagua, Chile

Information
- Type: High school

Colegio Tomás Guaglén (English: Tomás Guaglén School) is a Chilean high school located in Rancagua, Cachapoal Province, Chile.
