= Colegio Los Cipreses =

High school in Cachapoal Province, Chile

- Doñihue, Chile

Information
- Type: Middle and High school
- Motto: "Doing the job extremely well every day" ("Hacer extraordinariamente bien el trabajo de cada día")
- Established: 2002
- Principal: Edmundo Urtubia
- Colors: Blue and Green

Colegio Los Cipreses (English: Los Cipreses School) is a Chilean high school located in Doñihue, Cachapoal Province, Chile.
