= Instituto Politécnico Santa Cruz =

Coordinates: 34.63218°S 71.36609°W

- Santa Cruz, Chile

Information
- Type: High school

Instituto Politécnico Santa Cruz (English: Santa Cruz Polytechnical Institute) is a Chilean high school located in Santa Cruz, Colchagua Province, Chile.
