= Colegio Niño Jesús de Praga =

School in Rancagua, Cachapoal Province, Chile

Escuela Niño Jesús de Praga
- Rancagua, Chile

Information
- Type: Primary and secondary school

Colegio Niño Jesús de Praga (English: School of the Baby Jesus of Prague), officially known as the Escuela Particular N° 11 Niño Jesús de Praga is a Chilean primary and secondary school located in Rancagua, Cachapoal Province, Chile.

The school is one of two owned by the Chilean Roman Catholic Congregation of the Precious Blood of Our Lord Jesus Christ in O'Higgins Region, the other one being Colegio de la Preciosa Sangre de Pichilemu. It was founded on 25 June 1935. In 1998, it had 647 students from preschool to eighth grade. In 2012, it had 855 students from preschool to twelfth grade (cuarto medio).

The principal of Colegio Niño Jesús de Praga was, as of 2012, Mother Sandra Lidia Silva Macaya. The school ranks 1327th in the Top Prueba de Selección Universitaria scores.
