= Colegio Inglés Saint John =

Saint John English School
- Colegio Inglés Saint John
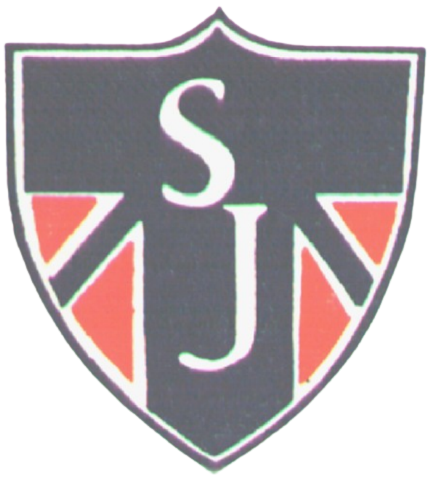

Location
- La Araucanía 525; O'Higgins Region; Cachapoal Province; Chile

Information
- School type: School Private
- Founded: 1984
- Founder: Irma Cristina Rivera Peña
- Director: Ana María Garrido Rivera
- Gender: Mixed
- Song: "To be in Saint John"
- Socio-economic decile: 10
- Website: saintjohn.cl

Colegio Inglés Saint John (English: Saint John English School) is a Chilean high school located in Rancagua, Cachapoal Province, Chile. It was founded in 1984 and is owned by the Sociedad Rivera y Cía. Ltda..
