= Instituto San Lorenzo =

- Rancagua, Chile

Information
- Type: High school
- Established: 1995

Instituto San Lorenzo (English: San Lorenzo Institute) is a high school located in Rancagua, Provincia de Cachapoal, Chile.

It was established in 1995.
