= Litueche Airport =

Airport in Chile

- IATA: none; ICAO: SCTU

Summary
- Airport type: Public
- Serves: Litueche, Chile
- Elevation AMSL: 787 ft / 240 m
- Coordinates: 34°06′45″S 71°43′07″W

Map
- Location of Litueche Airport in Chile

Runways
Direction	Length		Surface
Direction	m	ft	Surface
03/21	640	2,100	Grass
- Source: Landings.com Google Maps GCM

Litueche Airport Spanish: Aeropuerto de Litueche, (ICAO: SCTU) is an airport serving Litueche, a city in the O'Higgins Region of Chile. The runway is adjacent to the northeast side of the city.

== See also ==
- Transport in Chile
- List of airports in Chile
