= Liceo María Luisa Bombal =

Coordinates: 34.1708°S 70.7411°W

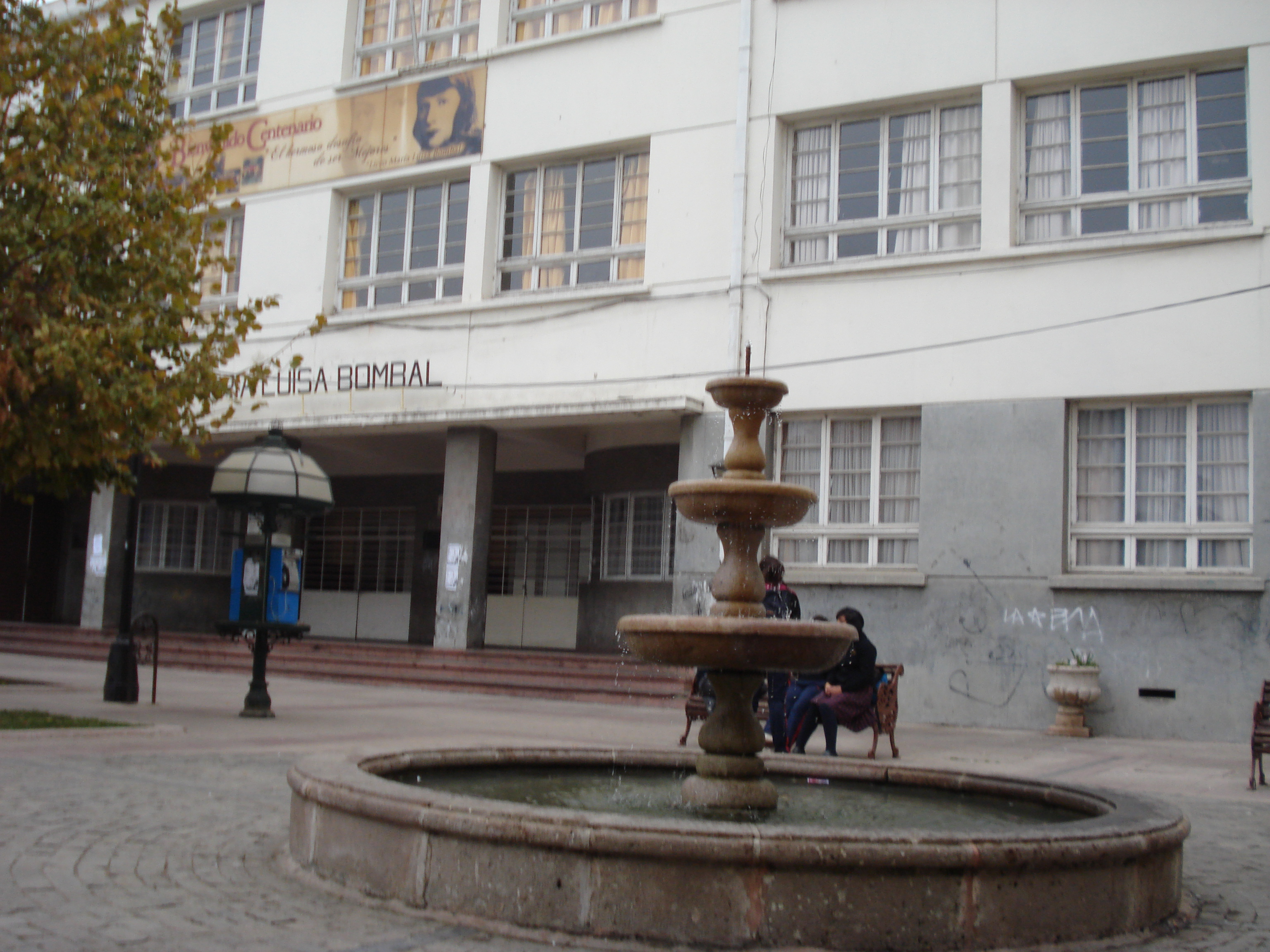
- Liceo María Luisa Bombal
- Rancagua, Chile

Information
- Type: High school

Liceo María Luisa Bombal (English: María Luisa Bombal High School) is a Chilean high school located in Rancagua, Cachapoal Province, Chile.
