= Liceo Elvira Sánchez de Garcés =

- Mostazal, Chile

Information
- Type: High school
- Established: 1919

Liceo Elvira Sánchez de Garcés (English: Elvira Sánchez de Garcés High School) is a Chilean high school located in Mostazal, Cachapoal Province, Chile. This mission of Liceo Elvira Sánchez de Garcés was to offer children in the sector of La Punta a place of education that was close to their place of living. It was founded as a public school in the year 1919.

Between the years 1958 to 1968, technical courses were added to the curriculum to allow for a vocational degree, such as in sewing and fashion.
