= Colegio La Cruz =

High school in Cachapoal Province, Chile

Coordinates: 34.19534°S 70.70817°W

- Machalí, Chile

Information
- Type: High school

Colegio La Cruz (English: La Cruz School) is a Chilean secondary school located in Machalí, Cachapoal Province, Chile.
