= Colegio Cristo Obrero =

High school in Cachapoal Province, Chile

Cristo Obrero Agricultural School
- Saint Helena 313, Graneros, Chile

Information
- Type: High school
- Established: March 15, 1954
- Principal: Ema Contreras Fuentes
- Song: Himno Escuela Arícola Cristo Obero
- Website: www.eaco.cl

Escuela Agrícola Cristo Obrero (English: Cristo Obrero Agricultural School) is a Catholic Chilean high school located in Graneros, Cachapoal Province, Chile. Since 2017 it has been free at the point of use and is funded by the Church and voluntary donations.

The school's website describes its mission with the following words: "The Escuela Agrícola Cristo Obrero is an educational community that collaborates with the mission of the diocesan Catholic Church, to educate young people in the faith and to enable them to identify and assume their rights and responsibilities."
