= Liceo Bicentenario Oriente =

- Rengo, Chile

Information
- Type: High school

Liceo Bicentenario Oriente (English: Bicentenario Oriente High School) is a Chilean high school located in Rengo, Cachapoal Province, Chile.
