= Liceo José Victorino Lastarria (Rancagua) =

- Rancagua, Chile

Information
- Type: High school

Liceo José Victorino Lastarria (English: José Victorino Lastarria High School) is a Chilean high school located in Rancagua, Cachapoal Province, Chile.
