= Liceo Fermín del Real Castillo =

Location
- Chépica, Chile
- Coordinates: 34.72689°S 71.27607°W

Information
- Type: High school
- Established: 1982

Liceo Fermín del Real Castillo (English: Fermín del Real Castillo High School) is a Chilean high school located in Chépica, Colchagua Province, Chile.
