= Liceo San José =

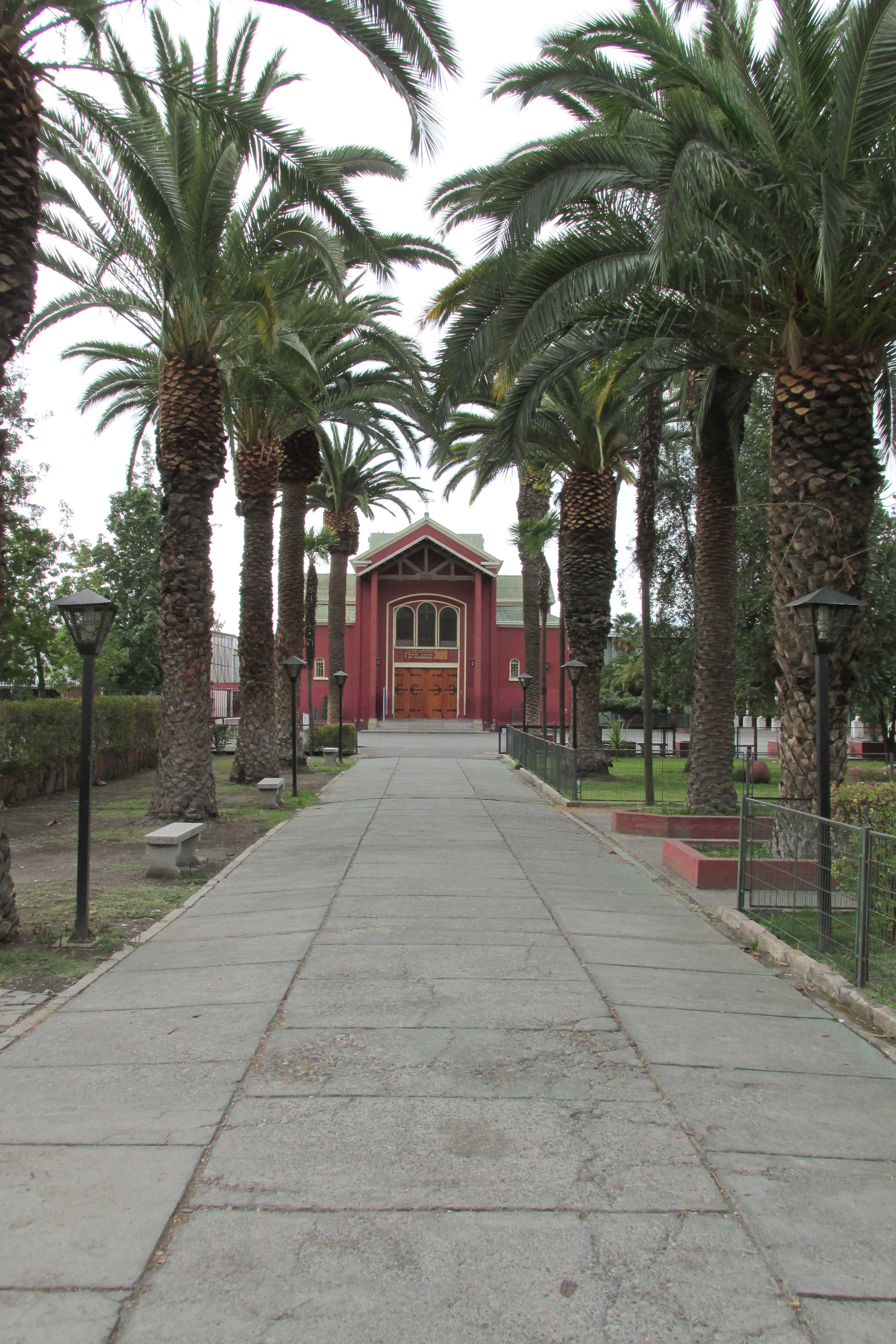

Location
- Requínoa, Chile; Libertador General Bernardo O'Higgins; Cachapoal; Chile
- Coordinates: -34.28654470317565, -70.81922474322435

Information
- Other name: LSJ
- Type: High school
- Religious affiliation: Catholic
- Founder: The Congregation of San José
- Enrollment: 1,600 students.
- Colors: Yellow, red and blue
- Website: https://sanjoserequinoa.cl

Liceo San José (English: San José High School) is a church school, located in the sixth region in the commune of Requínoa, Cachapoal Province, Chile., founded in 1953 by the Josephite Congregation of Murialdo.

The educational levels range from kindergarten through the fourth grade of humanistic-scientific and technical-professional education, which are divided into four sections: Nursery Education (Prekinder to Kinder), Elementary Education (first to sixth grade), Middle School (seventh grade to first middle school) and High School
