= Colegio Quimahue =

High school in Chile

- Rancagua, Chile

Information
- Type: High school

Colegio Quimahue (English: Quimahue School) is a Chilean high school located in Rancagua, Cachapoal Province, Chile.
