= Villa María College =

- Machalí, Chile

Information
- Type: High school

Villa María College is a Chilean high school located in Machalí, Cachapoal Province, Chile.
