= Colegio Sagrado Corazón de Jesús =

- Quinta de Tilcoco, Chile

Information
- Type: High school

Colegio Sagrado Corazón de Jesús (English: Sagrado Corazón de Jesús Particular School) is a Chilean high school located in Quinta de Tilcoco, Cachapoal Province, Chile.
