= Colegio Santa Cruz de Unco =

High school in Colchagua Province, Chile

Coordinates: 34.63132°S 71.36187°W

- Santa Cruz, Chile

Information
- Type: High school

Colegio Santa Cruz de Unco (English: Santa Cruz de Unco School) is a Chilean high school located in Santa Cruz, Colchagua Province, Chile.
