= Liceo de Lolol =

Coordinates: 34.7284°S 71.6461°W

- Lolol, Chile

Information
- Type: High school

Liceo de Lolol (English: Lolol High School) is a Chilean high school located in Lolol, Colchagua Province, Chile.
