= Liceo Municipal de Codegua =

- Codegua, Chile

Information
- Type: High school

Liceo Municipal de Codegua (English: Codegua Municipal High School) is a Chilean high school located in Codegua, Cachapoal Province, Chile.
