= Colegio Sagrado Corazón (Chile) =

- Rancagua, Chile

Information
- Type: High school

Colegio Sagrado Corazón (English: Sagrado Corazón School) was a Chilean high school located in Rancagua, Cachapoal Province, Chile. The school ceased operations on 31 December 2014, because of a "constant enrollment decrease".
