= Colegio Teresiano Juanita Fernández =

High school in Cachapoal Province, Chile

- Mostazal, Chile

Information
- Type: High school

Colegio Teresiano Juanita Fernández (English: Juanita Fernández Theresian School) is a Chilean high school located in Mostazal, Cachapoal Province, Chile.
