= Liceo Machalí =

Liceo de Machalí
- Machalí, Chile

Information
- Type: High school

Liceo de Machalí (English: Machalí High School) is a Chilean high school located in Machalí, Cachapoal Province, Chile.
