= San Sebastián School =

Colegio San Sebastian School
- Rancagua, Chile

Information
- Type: Primary and secondary school
- Established: 3 March 2003
- Principal: Luis Rojas Caro
- Enrollment: 834 (2012)
- Website: http://sansebastianschool.webescuela.cl

San Sebastián School is a Chilean primary and secondary located in Rancagua, Cachapoal Province, Chile.

The school was created by the Sociedad San Sebastián, represented by Guillermo Olave Castillo and Luis Aravena Pereira, on 3 March 2003. Its current principal is Luis Rojas Caro. The president of the parents' center (centro de padres) is Paola Choapa Rojas.
