= Colegio Bernardo O'Higgins =

High school in Cachapoal Province, Chile

Coordinates: 29.9606°S 71.3376°W

- Rancagua, Chile

Information
- Type: High school

Colegio Bernardo O'Higgins (English: Bernardo O'Higgins School) is a Chilean high school located in Rancagua, Cachapoal Province, Chile.
