= Centro Educacional Asunción =

Location
- Rengo, Chile
- Coordinates: 34.4098°S 70.8558°W

Information
- Type: High school

Centro Educacional Asunción (English: Asunción Educational Centre) is a Chilean high school located in Rengo, Cachapoal Province, Chile.
