= Colegio Hispano Chileno El Pilar =

High school in Cachapoal Province, Chile

- Rancagua, Chile

Information
- Type: High school

Colegio Hispano Chileno El Pilar (English: El Pilar Spanish-Chilean School) is a Chilean high school located in Rancagua, Cachapoal Province, Chile.
