= Liceo Requínoa =

High school in Chile

- Requínoa, Chile

Information
- Type: High school
- Established: 1999

Liceo Requínoa (English: Requínoa High School) is a Chilean high school located in Requínoa, Cachapoal Province, Chile.
