= Liceo Técnico Profesional Santa Rosa =

- Rancagua, Chile

Information
- Type: High school

Liceo Técnico Profesional Santa Rosa (English: Santa Rosa Technical-Professional High School) is a Chilean high school located in Rancagua, Cachapoal Province, Chile.
