= Colegio Ena Bellemans Montti =

High school in Cachapoal Province, Chile

- Rancagua, Chile

Information
- Type: High school

Colegio Ena Bellemans Montti (English: Ena Bellemans Montti School) is a Chilean high school located in Rancagua, Cachapoal Province, Chile.
