= Colegio La República =

High school in Cachapoal Province, Chile

Coordinates: 34.17731°S 70.74307°W

- Rancagua, Chile

Information
- Type: High school
- Website: www.colegiolarepublica.cl

Colegio La República (English: La República School) is a Chilean high school located in Rancagua, Cachapoal Province, Chile.

As of 2012, the principal of Colegio La República is Juan Antonio Gutiérrez Espinoza. In that school year, La República had 995 students. The president of the parents' center (centro de padres y apoderados) is Roberto Torres, and in its 2010–2011 term, the president of the students' center (centro de alumnos) is Javiera Garrido Mella.
