= Colegio Santa María Goretti =

High school in Cachapoal Province, Chile

Coordinates: 34.17308°S 70.73608°W

- Rancagua, Chile

Information
- Type: High school

Colegio Santa María Goretti (English: Santa María Goretti School) is a Chilean high school located in Rancagua, Cachapoal Province, Chile.
