= Olivar College =

Coordinates: 34.21864°S 70.81832°W

- Olivar, Chile

Information
- Type: High school

Olivar College is a Chilean high school located in Olivar, Cachapoal Province, Chile.
