= Colegio Weber School =

High school in Chile

- Rancagua, Chile

Information
- Type: High school

Colegio Weber School was a Chilean high school located in Rancagua, Cachapoal Province, Chile. It was closed in 2012, after the Ministry of Education revoked the official recognition of the educational institution.
