= Instituto Lautaro =

- Codegua, Chile

Information
- Type: High school

Instituto Lautaro (English: Lautaro Institute) is a Chilean high school located in Codegua, Cachapoal Province, Chile.
