= Instituto Sagrado Corazón =

Coordinates: 33.5924°S 70.7090°W

- Rancagua, Chile

Information
- Type: High school

Instituto Sagrado Corazón (English: Sagrado Corazón Institute) is a Chilean high school located in Rancagua, Cachapoal Province, Chile.
