= Liceo Ernesto Pinto Lagarrigue =

- Rancagua, Chile

Information
- Type: High school

Liceo Ernesto Pinto Lagarrigue (English: Ernesto Pinto Lagarrigue) is a Chilean high school located in Rancagua, Cachapoal Province, Chile.
