= Instituto Sewell =

- Rancagua, Chile

Information
- Type: High school
- Website: institutosewell.cl

Instituto Sewell (English: Sewell Institute) is a Chilean high school located in Rancagua, Cachapoal Province, Chile.
