= Colegio Arturo Prat =

High school in Cachapoal Province, Chile

- Machalí, Chile

Information
- Type: High school
- Established: November 4, 1982
- Website: http://caprat.cl/

Colegio Arturo Prat (English: Arturo Prat School) is a Chilean high school located in Machalí, Cachapoal Province, Chile.
