= Colegio Particular San Andrés =

High school in Cachapoal Province, Chile

- Mostazal, Chile

Information
- Type: High school

Colegio Particular San Andrés (English: San Andrés Particular School) is a Chilean high school located in Mostazal, Cachapoal Province, Chile.
