= Instituto Monseñor Lecaros =

- Coltauco, Chile

Information
- Type: High school

Instituto Monseñor Lecaros (English: Monseñor Lecaros Institute) is a Chilean high school located in Coltauco, Cachapoal Province, Chile.
