= Placilla =

- Town and Commune
- Flag Coat of arms Map of Placilla commune in O'Higgins Region Location in Chile
- Coordinates (city): 34°38′15″S 71°07′30″W
- Country: Chile
- Region: (O'Higgins Region) O'Higgins
- Province: (Colchagua Province) Colchagua

Government
  - Type: Municipality
  - Alcalde: Marcelo González Farías

Area
  - Total: 146.9 km^{2} (56.7 sq mi)
- Elevation: 234 m (768 ft)

Population (2012 Census)
  - Total: 8,277
  - Density: 56.34/km^{2} (145.9/sq mi)
  - Urban: 2,114
  - Rural: 5,964

Sex
  - Men: 4,134
  - Women: 3,944
- Time zone: UTC-4 (CLT)
  - Summer (DST): UTC-3 (CLST)
- Area code: (+56) 72
- Website: Municipality of Placilla

Placilla is a Chilean town and commune in Colchagua Province, O'Higgins Region.

== Demographics ==
According to the 2002 census of the National Statistics Institute, Placilla spans an area of 146.9 km^{2} (57 sq mi) and has 8,078 inhabitants (4,134 men and 3,944 women). Of these, 2,114 (26.2%) lived in urban areas and 5,964 (73.8%) in rural areas. The population grew by 3.6% (279 persons) between the 1992 and 2002 censuses.

== Administration ==
As a commune, Placilla is a third-level administrative division of Chile administered by a municipal council, headed by an alcalde who is directly elected every four years. The 2012–2016 mayor was José Joaquín Latorre Muñoz (PDC); Latorre, however, died as a consequence of a car crash on 22 July 2013. Latorre had previously held the mayoral office between 1992 and 2008. He was succeeded by Tulio Contreras Álvarez, a member of the local council, who has been reelected until 2024. He died in 2022, during his third term as mayor of Placilla, and was succeeded by Marcelo González, also a Christian Democrat.
