= Liceo El Rosario =

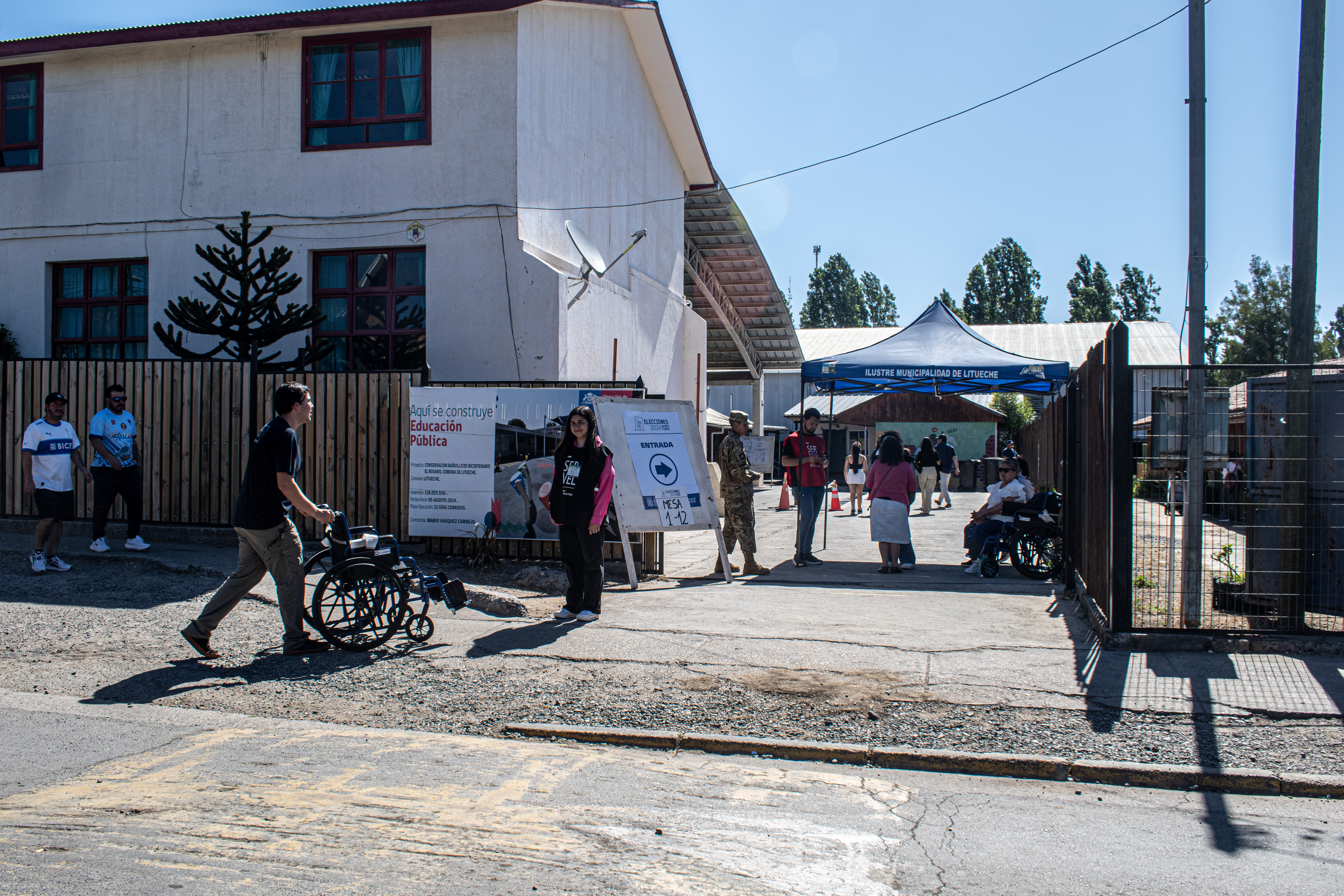
- Hermanos Carrera St., Litueche, Chile

Information
- Type: High school

Liceo El Rosario (English: El Rosario High School), formerly known as Escuela FN453, is a Chilean high school located in Litueche, Cardenal Caro Province, Chile.

== History ==
Founded as Escuela FN453, renamed in 1990 to Liceo El Rosario de Litueche, it is the only high school in the commune of Litueche.

Originally a primary school, it began teaching Primero medio and Segundo medio in 1989, and in 1998 it began teaching Tercero medio and Cuarto medio. In 2007, the Escuela Básica Cardenal Raúl Silva Henríquez was created, turning Liceo El Rosario into a secondary-only school.

Liceo El Rosario is located in the Hermanos Carrera street, in the centre of Litueche.
