= Liceo Comercial Diego Portales =

Coordinates: 34.17645°S 70.73941°W

- Rancagua, Chile

Information
- Type: High school
- Established: 10 June 1942
- Website: www.lcdportales.cl

Liceo Comercial Diego Portales (English: Diego Portales Commercial High School) is a Chilean high school located in Rancagua, Chile.
