= Liceo Pablo Neruda =

Liceo Municipal Pablo Neruda
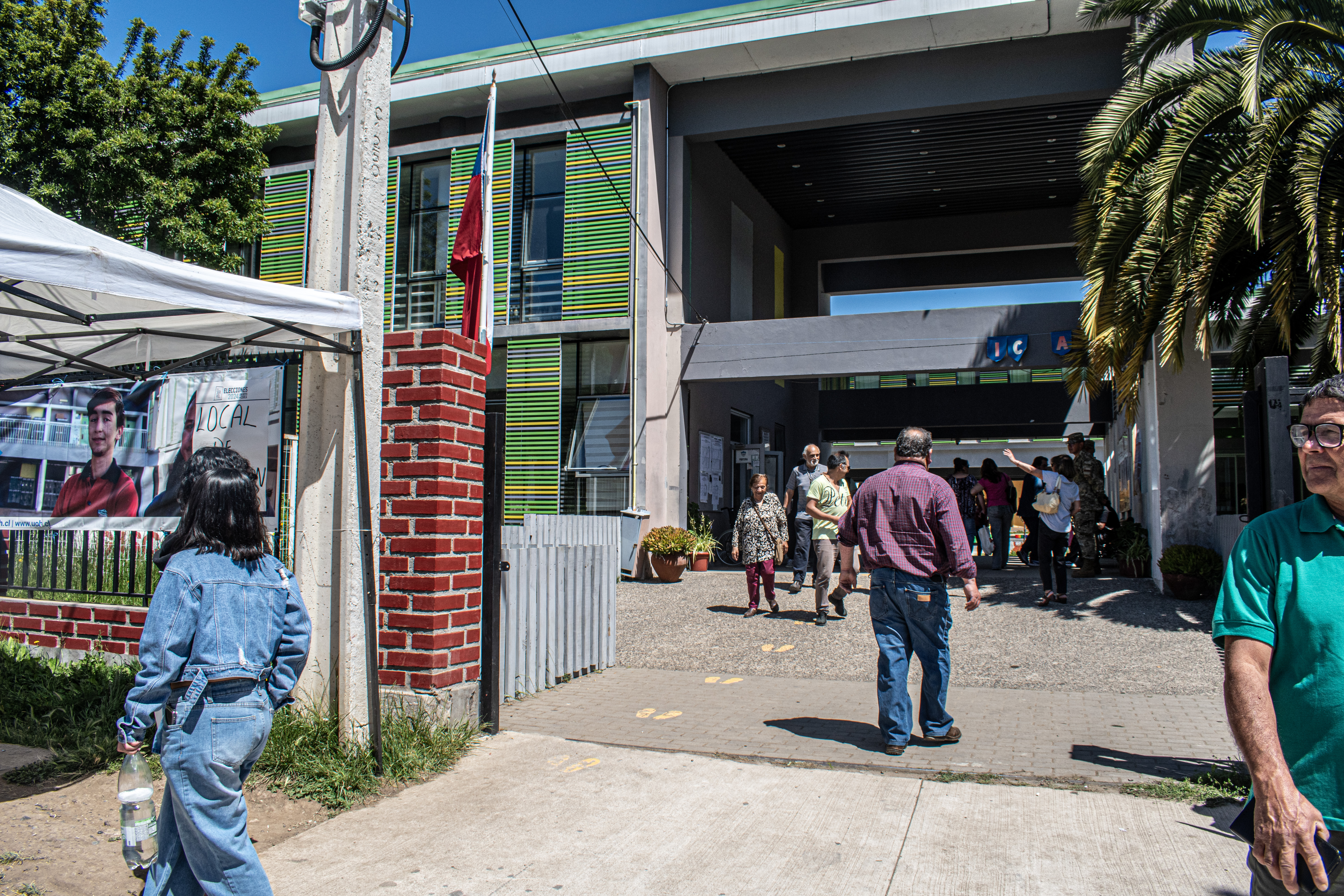
- Camino Público Km. 1, Navidad, Chile

Information
- Type: Primary (from Séptimo básico) and secondary school
- Established: 1888
- Principal: Ximena Mora Donoso
- Enrollment: 275 (2012)
- Website: Liceo Pablo Neruda

Liceo Pablo Neruda (English: Pablo Neruda High School) is a Chilean municipal high school located in Navidad, Cardenal Caro Province, Chile. In addition to work as a common Scientific-Humanistic high school, it is also a Technical-Professional high school. It is named after Nobel laureate, prizewinning poet Pablo Neruda. The only high school in Navidad, students from the communes of Litueche and La Estrella also attend it.

As of 2012, it had 275 students. The principal of Liceo Pablo Neruda is Ximena Mora Donoso, and the president of the parents' center (centro de padres) is Irma Núñez Lucero. Fourteen teachers work in the institution, of which two have been evaluated by the Ministry of Education as "Destacado" (Outstanding).
