= Liceo Mercedes Urzúa Díaz =

Liceo Municipal Mercedes Urzúa Díaz
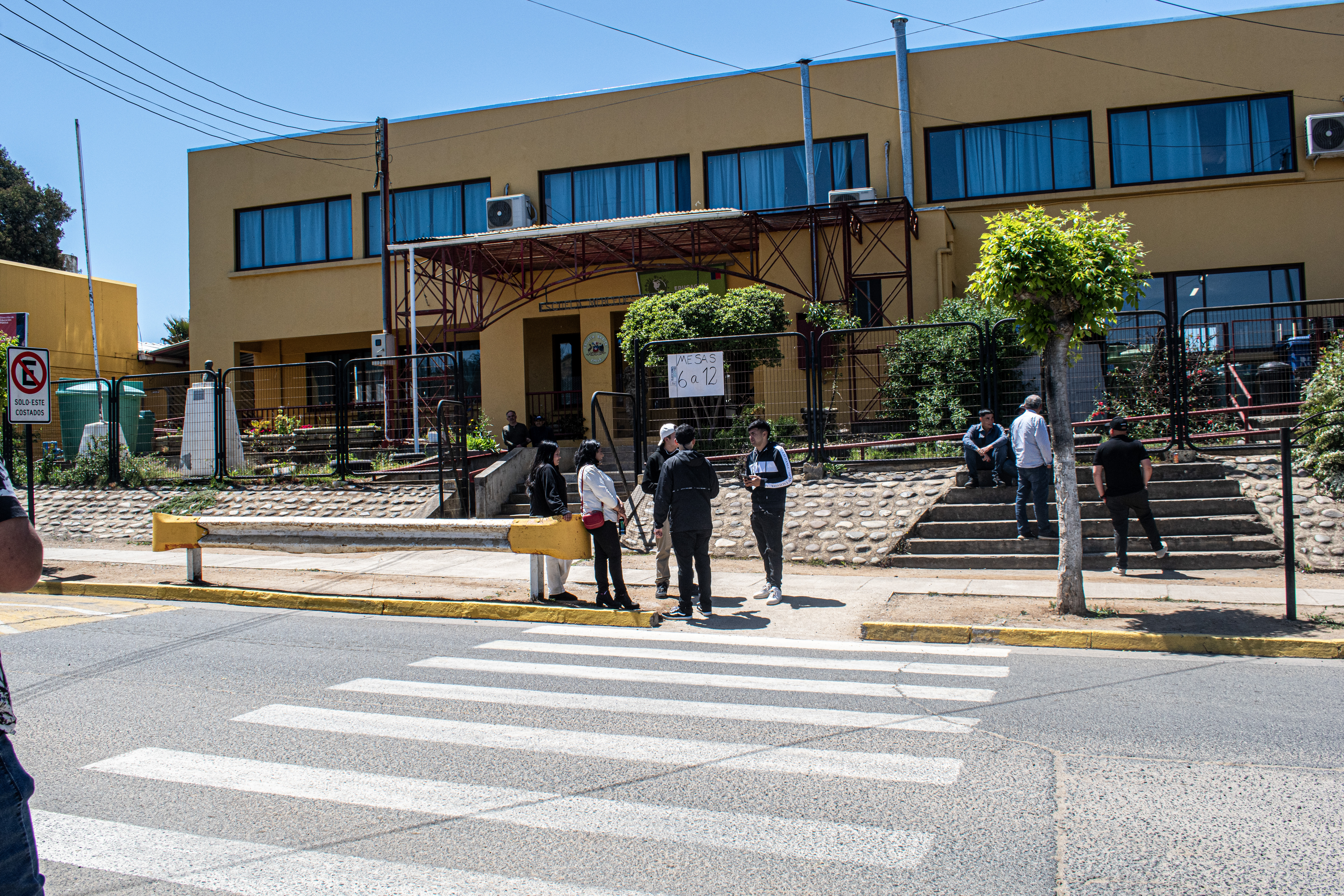
- Dr. Moore St. 76, Paredones, Chile

Information
- Type: Primary and secondary school
- Principal: Flavio Rojas Acosta
- Enrollment: 269 (2012)

Liceo Mercedes Urzúa Díaz (English: Mercedes Urzúa Díaz High School) is a Chilean primary and secondary school (up to Segundo medio) located in Paredones, Cardenal Caro Province, Chile.

As of 2012 it has 269 students. Twenty teachers work in the institution. The principal of Liceo Mercedes Urzúa Díaz is Flavio Rojas Acosta, and the president of the parents' center (centro de padres) is Ricardo Muñoz Ulloa.
