= Liceo Mirella Catalán Urzúa =

Coordinates: 34.65025°S 71.90679°W

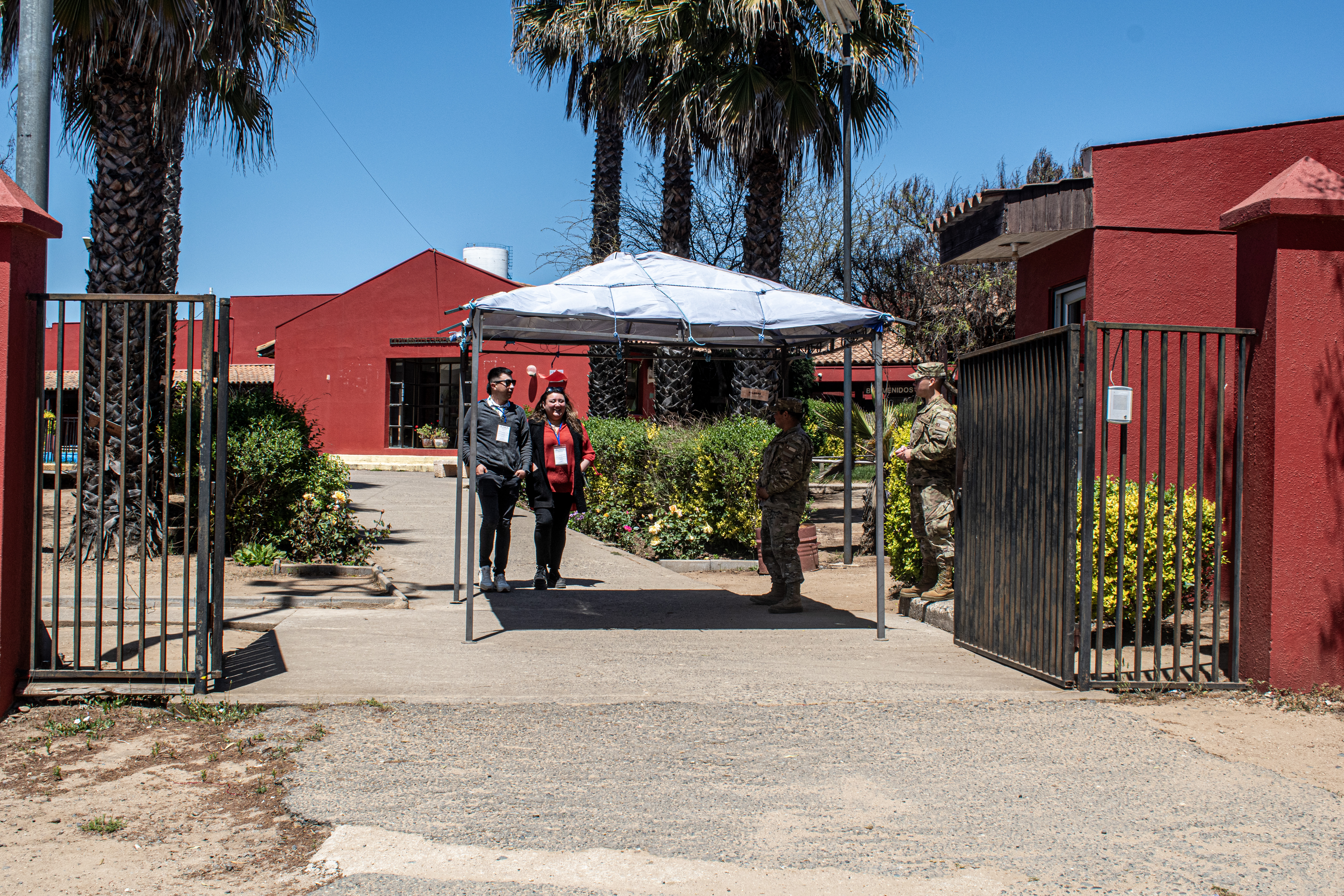
- Paredones, Chile

Information
- Type: High school

Liceo Mirella Catalán Urzúa (English: Mirella Catalán Urzúa High School) is a Chilean high school located in Paredones, Cardenal Caro Province, Chile. It is named after a former mayor of Paredones.
