= Instituto Cardenal Caro =

- Libertad St. 451, Marchigüe, Chile

Information
- Type: High school
- Principal: Erica Roxana Alvarado Canales
- Enrollment: 191

Instituto Cardenal Caro (English: Cardenal Caro Institute), officially recognized as Liceo Municipal Instituto Cardenal Caro, is a Chilean high school located in Marchigüe, Cardenal Caro Province, Chile.

In 2007, Intendant of O'Higgins Region Hector Huenchullán inaugurated the modern dependencies of Instituto Cardenal Caro, worth 395 million pesos (almost a million dollars).

Instituto Cardenal Caro's current principal is Erica Alvarado Canales, and has 191 students as of 2012. The president of the centro de alumnos is Nicole Guajardo Carrasco. The educational institution is named after Cardinal José María Caro.
