= Litueche =

Litueche (El) Rosario (Lo Solís)
- Town and Commune
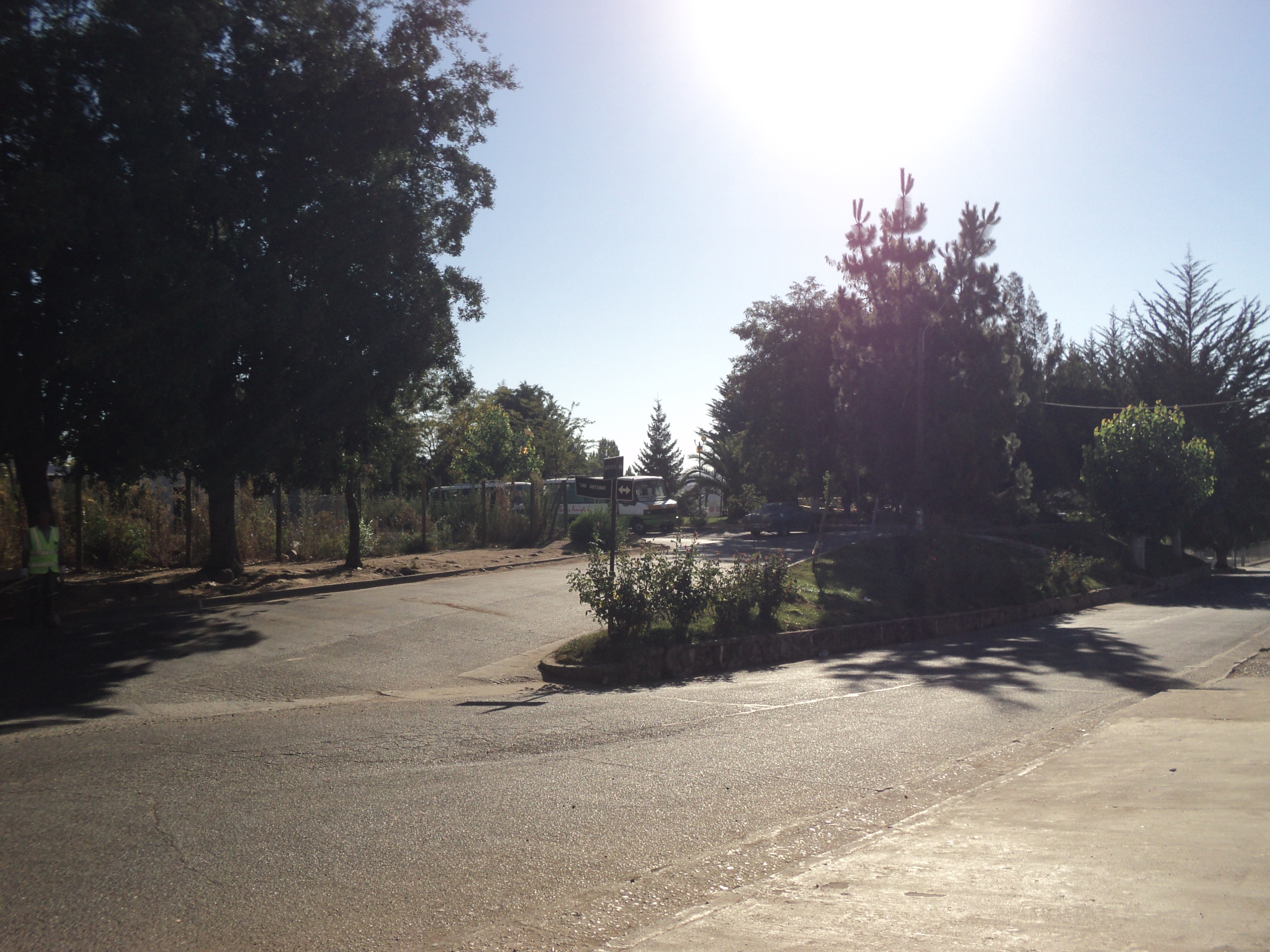
- View of Litueche, looking forward to its main square, on March 1, 2011.

- Coat of arms Map of Litueche commune in O'Higgins Region Location in Chile
- Coordinates (town): 34°07′0″S 71°44′15″W
- Country: Chile
- Region: (O'Higgins Region) O'Higgins
- Province: (Cardenal Caro Province) Cardenal Caro

Government
  - Type: Municipality
  - Alcalde: René Acuña Echeverría

Area
  - Total: 618.8 km^{2} (238.9 sq mi)
- Elevation: 269 m (883 ft)

Population (2012 Census)
  - Total: 6,118
  - Density: 9.887/km^{2} (25.61/sq mi)
  - Urban 2002: 2,479
  - Rural 2002: 3,047

Sex 2002
  - Men: 2,932
  - Women: 2,594
- Time zone: UTC-4 (CLT)
  - Summer (DST): UTC-3 (CLST)
- Area code: (+56) 72
- Website: Municipality of Litueche

Litueche (Mapudungun: people of the white lands; originally called El Rosario, Rosario Lo Solís or simply Rosario) is a Chilean town and commune in Cardenal Caro Province, O'Higgins Region.

It is served by Litueche Airport.

== Demographics ==
According to the 2002 census of the National Statistics Institute, Litueche spans an area of 618.8 km^{2} (239 sq mi) and has 5,526 inhabitants (2,932 men and 2,594 women). Of these, 2,479 (44.9%) lived in urban areas and 3,047 (55.1%) in rural areas. The population grew by 1.1% (60 persons) between the 1992 and 2002 censuses.

== Administration ==
As a commune, Litueche is a third-level administrative division of Chile administered by a municipal council, headed by an alcalde who is directly elected every four years. The 2021-2024 alcalde is René Acuña Echeverría.
