= San Vicente de Tagua Tagua =

- City and Commune
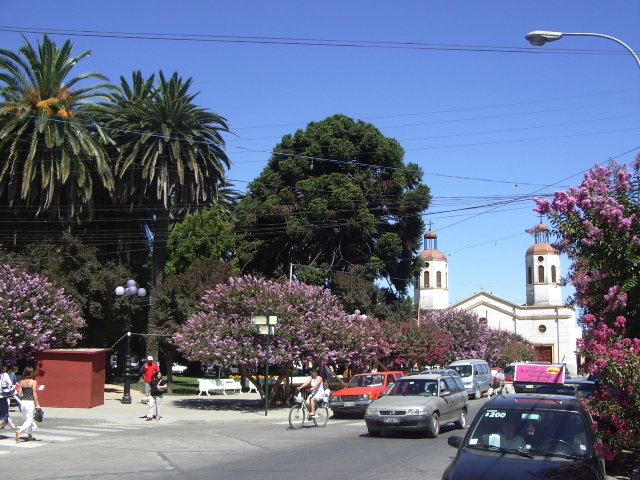
- Northeast of "Plaza de San Vicente" in 2005

- Map of the commune of San Vicente in O'Higgins Region Location in Chile
- Coordinates: 34°26′22″S 71°04′34″W
- Country: Chile
- Region: O'Higgins
- Province: Cachapoal
- Founded: 1845
- Founder: Carmen Gallegos de Robles

Government
  - Type: Municipality

Area
  - Total: 475.8 km^{2} (183.7 sq mi)
- Elevation: 206 m (676 ft)

Population (2012 Census)
  - Total: 44,046
  - Density: 92.57/km^{2} (239.8/sq mi)
  - Urban 2002: 21,965
  - Rural 2002: 18,288

Sex (2002)
  - Men: 20,095
  - Women: 20,158
- Time zone: UTC-4 (CLT)
  - Summer (DST): UTC-3 (CLST)
- Area code: (+56) 72
- Website: Official website (in Spanish)

San Vicente de Tagua Tagua, or simplified as San Vicente, is a Chilean commune and city in Cachapoal Province, O'Higgins Region.

== Demographics ==
According to the 2002 census of the National Statistics Institute, San Vicente spans an area of 475.8 km^{2} (184 sq mi) and had 40,253 inhabitants (20,095 men and 20,158 women). Of these, 21,965 (54.6%) lived in urban areas and 18,288 (45.4%) in rural areas. The population grew by 14.5% (5,086 persons) between the 1992 and 2002 censuses. The 2012 census reported 44,046 inhabitants, an increase of 9.4% from 2002 to 2012.

== Administration ==
As a commune, San Vicente is a third-level administrative division administered by a municipal council, headed by an alcalde who is directly elected every four years.

Within the electoral divisions of Chile, San Vicente is represented in the Chamber of Deputies by Alejandra Sepúlveda (PRI) and Javier Macaya (UDI) as part of the 34th electoral district, together with San Fernando, Chimbarongo, Peumo, Pichidegua and Las Cabras. The commune is represented in the Senate by Andrés Chadwick Piñera (UDI) and Juan Pablo Letelier Morel (PS) as part of the 9th senatorial constituency (O'Higgins Region).

== Archaeology ==
Tagua-Tagua represents a very early Paleo-Indian archaeological site, and it is dated to 11,380 ±380 ^{14}C yr BP (before present).

This is an ancient pleistocene site where humans butchered large animals that they hunted. The site was discovered in the 1860s.

An upper, younger stratum is about 1 m below the surface. The older stratum is about 2.4 m below the surface, and contains chipped stone tools. Horse and mastodon remains are represented, as well as smaller animals.
