= Chimbarongo =

- City and Commune
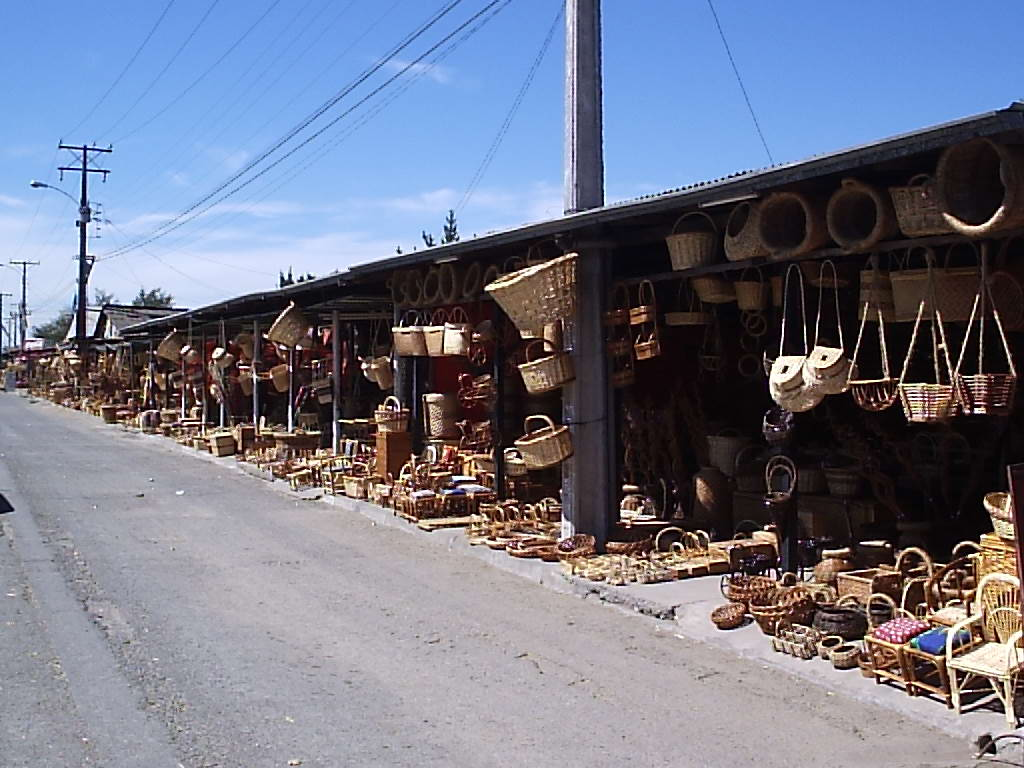
- Crafts of Chimbarongo.

- Coat of arms Map of Chimbarongo commune in the O'Higgins Region Location in Chile
- Coordinates (city): 34°42′32″S 71°02′35″W
- Country: Chile
- Region: (O'Higgins Region) O'Higgins
- Province: (Colchagua Province) Colchagua

Government
  - Type: Municipality
  - Alcalde: Marco Contreras Jorquera

Area
  - Total: 497.9 km^{2} (192.2 sq mi)
- Elevation: 295 m (968 ft)

Population (2012 Census)
  - Total: 33,446
  - Density: 67.17/km^{2} (174.0/sq mi)
  - Urban: 16,889
  - Rural: 15,427

Sex
  - Men: 16,612
  - Women: 15,704
- Time zone: UTC-4 (CLT)
  - Summer (DST): UTC-3 (CLST)
- Area code: (+56) 72
- Website: Municipality of Chimbarongo

Chimbarongo, Chile, is a city and commune located 160 km (99 mi) south of Santiago in the Colchagua Province of the O'Higgins Region. Many people in Chimbarongo make their living weaving wickerwork and baskets from mimbre.

== Demographics ==
According to the 2002 census of the National Statistics Institute, Chimbarongo spans an area of 497.9 km^{2} (192 sq mi) and has 32,316 inhabitants (16,612 men and 15,704 women). Of these, 16,889 (52.3%) lived in urban areas and 15,427 (47.7%) in rural areas. The population grew by 5.4% (1,651 people) between the 1992 and 2002 censuses.

== Administration ==
As a commune, Chimbarongo is a third-level administrative division of Chile administered by a municipal council, headed by an alcalde who is directly elected every four years. The 2021-2024 alcalde is Marco Contreras Jorquera.
