= San Fernando, Chile =

San Fernando
- City and Commune
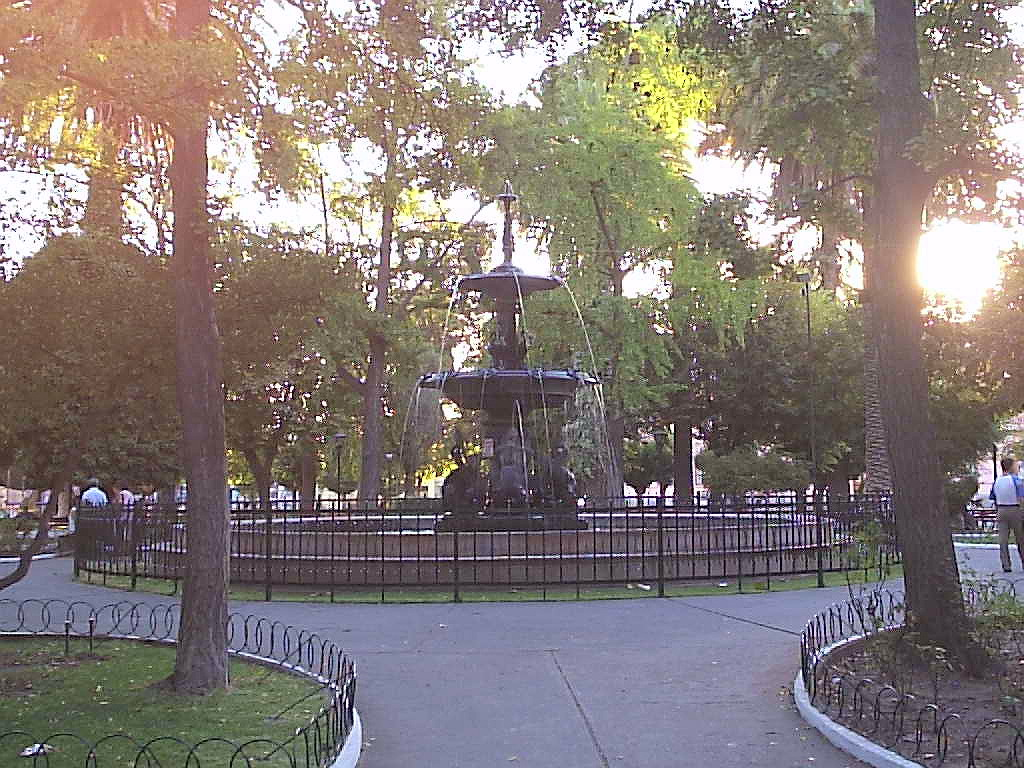
- San Fernando's central plaza.

- Coat of arms Map of San Fernando commune in O'Higgins Region Location in Chile
- Coordinates (city): 34°35′S 70°59′W
- Country: Chile
- Region: (O'Higgins Region) O'Higgins
- Province: (Colchagua Province) Colchagua
- Founded: 1742
- Founder: José Antonio Manso de Velasco

Government
  - Type: Municipality
  - mayor: Pablo Silva Pérez (Independent)

Area
  - Total: 2,441.3 km^{2} (942.6 sq mi)
- Elevation: 89 m (292 ft)

Population (2017 Census)
  - Total: 73,973
  - Density: 30.301/km^{2} (78.478/sq mi)
- Demonym: Sanfernandino/a

Sex
  - Men: 36,077
  - Women: 37,896
- Time zone: UTC-4 (CLT)
  - Summer (DST): UTC-3 (CLST)
- Postal code: 3070000
- Area code: +56 72
- Website: Official website (in Spanish)

San Fernando is the capital of the province of Colchagua, in central Chile, and the second most populated urban center of the O'Higgins Region. Located close to the Tinguiririca River (a tributary of the Rapel) in a fertile valley, San Fernando sits 339 m (1,112 feet) above sea level. Founded in 1742, it became the provincial capital in 1840.

== Culture ==
San Fernando is famous for its rodeos, thanks to its location at the heart of the country. The surrounding area yields wheat, forage crops, rice, legumes and grapes. There is also a brand of Chilean wine called San Fernando. Both the Pan-American Highway and Chile's main longitudinal railroad run through San Fernando.

San Fernando is located at the northern tip of Chile's Colchagua Valley. This region is popularly known as the heart of chilean agriculture. Here you can find the "wine route" which will take visitors on a journey from San Fernando to Santa Cruz, visiting some of Chile's most traditional vineyards.

Some major attractions in and around San Fernando include Casa Silva, a hotel, vineyard, and winery. Hacienda Los Lingues, a traditional chilean-style, colonial home of an hacienda "patrón" or owner that has been turned into a hotel and restaurant. The hacienda offers horseback riding adventures into the precordillera of the Andes.

Most major producers of fresh fruit for export are located in and around San Fernando. These include: Frusan, Unifruti, and Agricola Panagro. Within the orchards and farms of the region one can find almost every type of fresh produce; from citrus to premium quality fresh cherries.

San Fernando is also the point of departure to begin a trip to "Las Termas Del Flaco" (The thermal baths of Flaco). Flaco can be reached by travelling east of ruta 5 on the road to Puente Negro. "Las Termas" baths are open from mid-December to April and are located in an area famous for its large populations of Tricahues, a type of native parrot, and fossilized dinosaur footprints.

== Demographics ==
According to the 2017 census of the National Statistics Institute, San Fernando spans an area of 2,441.3 km^{2} (943 sq mi) and has 73,973 inhabitants (36,077 men and 37,896 women). The population grew by 16.1% (11,881 persons) between the 2002 and 2017 censuses.

== Administration ==
As a commune, San Fernando is a third-level administrative division of Chile administered by a municipal council, headed by a mayor who is democratically elected every four years. The current administration is run by Pablo Silva Pérez (right-wing independent) who was elected in the 2021 Chilean municipal elections.

== Climate ==
Climate data for Rengo
Month	Jan	Feb	Mar	Apr	May	Jun	Jul	Aug	Sep	Oct	Nov	Dec	Year
Mean daily maximum °C (°F)	29.8 (85.6)	28.8 (83.8)	26.2 (79.2)	22.1 (71.8)	18.8 (65.8)	14.0 (57.2)	13.8 (56.8)	14.2 (57.6)	18.4 (65.1)	21.7 (71.1)	24.0 (75.2)	28.3 (82.9)	21.7 (71.0)
Daily mean °C (°F)	21.4 (70.5)	20.2 (68.4)	17.0 (62.6)	13.6 (56.5)	10.5 (50.9)	7.6 (45.7)	7.9 (46.2)	8.5 (47.3)	11.3 (52.3)	14.4 (57.9)	16.7 (62.1)	20.1 (68.2)	14.1 (57.4)
Mean daily minimum °C (°F)	12.8 (55.0)	11.6 (52.9)	9.0 (48.2)	6.7 (44.1)	5.4 (41.7)	2.5 (36.5)	3.2 (37.8)	3.6 (38.5)	5.0 (41.0)	7.7 (45.9)	9.5 (49.1)	11.5 (52.7)	7.4 (45.3)
Average precipitation mm (inches)	5.4 (0.21)	9.3 (0.37)	9.2 (0.36)	16.6 (0.65)	98.7 (3.89)	157.6 (6.20)	118.2 (4.65)	100.4 (3.95)	38.9 (1.53)	24.3 (0.96)	18.7 (0.74)	3.4 (0.13)	600.7 (23.64)
Average relative humidity (%)	61	62	70	76	84	85	84	84	77	74	69	60	74
Source: Bioclimatografia de Chile

== Notable people ==
- Stephanie Vaquer, professional wrestler and WWE champion

== Gallery ==
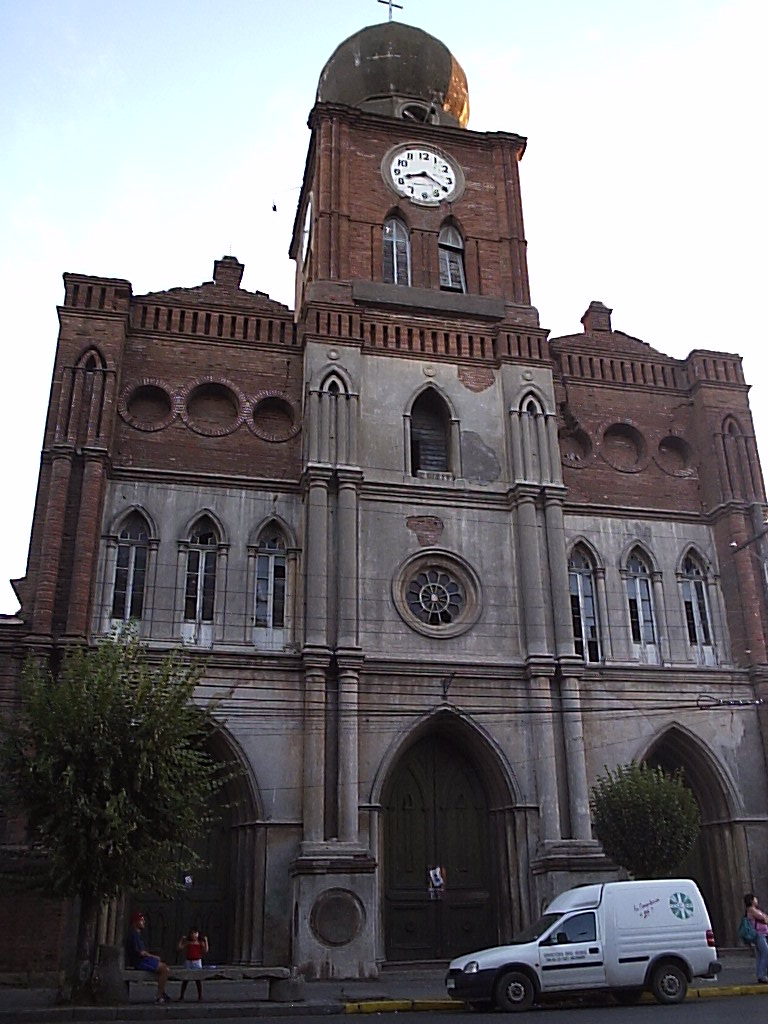
San Francisco Church.

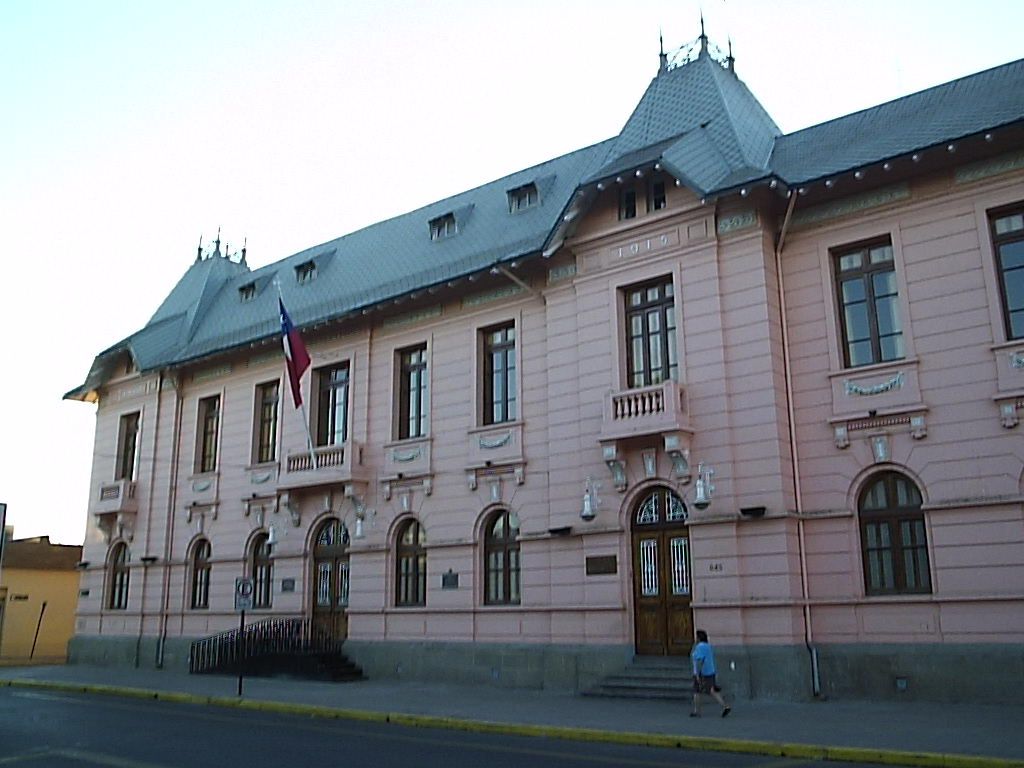
Gobernación de Colchagua.
