= Colchagua Province =

Colchagua Province Provincia de Colchagua
- Province
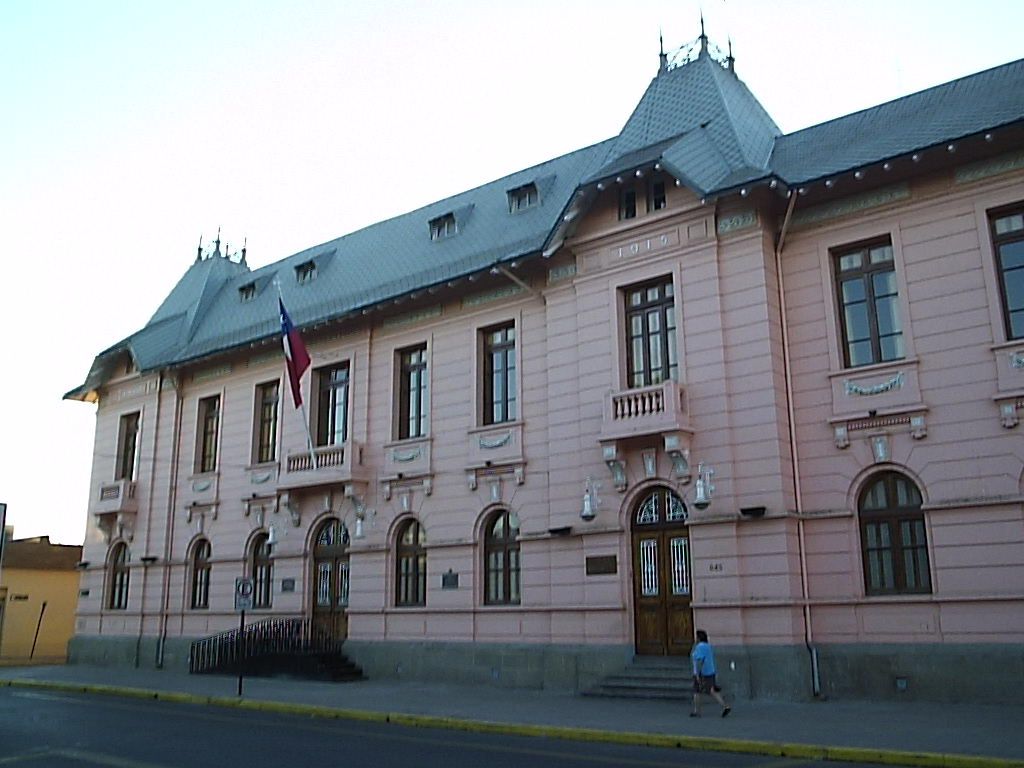
- Government of Colchagua's headquarters

- Seal

- Location in the Libertador General Bernardo O'Higgins Region

- Location in Chile
- Coordinates: 34°41′S 71°09′W
- Country: Chile
- Region: O'Higgins
- Capital: San Fernando
- Communes: List of 10: Chépica; Chimbarongo; Lolol; Nancagua; Palmilla; Peralillo; Placilla; Pumanque; San Fernando; Santa Cruz

Government
  - Type: Provincial
  - Presidential Provincial Delegate: vacancy

Area
  - Total: 5,678.0 km^{2} (2,192.3 sq mi)
  - Rank: 2

Population (2012 Census)
  - Total: 210,528
  - Rank: 2
  - Density: 37.078/km^{2} (96.031/sq mi)
  - Urban: 115,043
  - Rural: 81,523

Sex
  - Men: 98,982
  - Women: 97,584
- Time zone: UTC-4 (CLT)
  - Summer (DST): UTC-3 (CLST)
- Area code: 56 + 72
- Website: Government of Colchagua

Colchagua Province (Spanish: Provincia de Colchagua) is one of three provinces of the central Chilean region of O'Higgins (VI). Its capital is San Fernando. It is bordered on the north by Cachapoal Province, on the east by the Argentine Republic, on the south by Curicó Province, and on the west by Cardenal Caro Province.

== Geography and demography ==
The area of Colchagua is officially estimated at 5,678 km^{2} (2,192 sq mi) with a population (2002 census) at 196,566. Extending across the central valley of Chile, the province has a considerable area devoted to traditional agriculture and wine-growing. Its principal rivers are the Rapel River and its tributary, the Tinguiririca.

The principal towns are San Fernando, the provincial capital, Santa Cruz, Chimbarongo, Nancagua and Palmilla. San Fernando is one of the several towns founded in 1742 by the governor-general José Antonio Manso de Velasco, and it had a population of 64,000 in 2002.

== Administration ==
As a province, Colchagua is a second-level administrative division of Chile, governed by a provincial delegate who is appointed by the president.

The province comprises ten communes, each governed by a municipality consisting of an alcalde and municipal council.

- Chépica
- Chimbarongo
- Lolol
- Nancagua
- Palmilla
- Peralillo
- Placilla
- Pumanque
- San Fernando
- Santa Cruz

== Transport ==
The state central railway (EFE) from Santiago to the south crosses the province and has a regular stop in San Fernando. It used to have a branch running from San Fernando via Palmilla to Pichilemu on the coast. This is now closed, although one section of it has recently opened a limited service aimed at the tourist trade.

The more local Metrotrén service runs between Santiago and San Fernando stopping at most of the towns in between. There are frequent trains between these two points.

The Pan-American Highway runs through the San Fernando commune, passing close to the east side of the town.

== See also ==
- Tinguiririca River
- Maipo Valley
- Colchagua Valley (wine region)
