= Cachapoal Province =

Cachapoal Province Provincia de Cachapoal
- Province
- Seal

- Location in the Libertador General Bernardo O'Higgins Region

- Location in Chile
- Coordinates: 34°13′S 70°47′W
- Country: Chile
- Region: Libertador General Bernardo O'Higgins Region
- Capital: Rancagua
- Communes: List of 17: Codegua; Coínco; Coltauco; Doñihue; Graneros; Las Cabras; Machalí; Malloa; Olivar; Peumo; Pichidegua; Quinta de Tilcoco; Rancagua; Requínoa; Rengo; Mostazal; San Vicente de Tagua Tagua

Government
  - Type: Provincial
  - Presidential Provincial Delegate: None

Area
  - Total: 7,384.2 km^{2} (2,851.1 sq mi)

Population (2012 Census)
  - Total: 601,810
  - Density: 81.500/km^{2} (211.08/sq mi)
  - Urban: 415,108
  - Rural: 127,793

Sex
  - Men: 271,226
  - Women: 271,675
- Time zone: UTC-4 (CLT)
  - Summer (DST): UTC-3 (CLST)
- Area code: country 56 + area 72
- Website: Government of Cachapoal

Cachapoal Province (Spanish: Provincia de Cachapoal) is one of three provinces of the central Chilean region of O'Higgins (VI). Its capital is the city of Rancagua (pop. 214,344).

== Geography and demography ==
According to the 2002 census by the National Statistics Institute (INE), the province spans an area of 7,384.2 km^{2} (2,851 sq mi) and had a population of 542,901 inhabitants (271,226 men and 271,675 women), giving it a population density of 73.5/km^{2} (190/sq mi). It is the fifth most populated province in the country. Between the 1992 and 2002 censuses, the population grew by 13.8% (65,871 persons).

== Administration ==
As a province, Cachapoal is a second-level administrative division of Chile. It is governed by the regional delegate of O'Higgins, who is appointed by the president.

=== Communes ===
The province comprises seventeen communes, each governed by a municipality consisting of an elected alcalde and municipal council.

- Codegua
- Coínco
- Coltauco
- Doñihue
- Graneros
- Las Cabras
- Machalí
- Malloa
- Olivar
- Peumo
- Pichidegua
- Quinta de Tilcoco
- Rancagua
- Requínoa
- Rengo
- Mostazal
- San Vicente de Tagua Tagua

== Cachapoal Valley wine region ==
Located 85 km (53 mi) south of Santiago, the Cachapoal Valley is a wine-growing area in Cachapoal in the O`Higgins Region of central Chile, to the north of the Rapel Valley. It is located between the heights of Paine to the north and Pelequén to the south and between the Andes to the west and the smaller coastal range to the east. The valley takes its name from the Cachapoal River that flows through Rapel Valley along with its tributaries, the Claro and Cortaderal Rivers. All these watercourses flow into Lake Rapel.

The climate of the valley is temperate and consistently Mediterranean, sheltered by the coastal range from the cooling influences of the Pacific Ocean.

Most of Cachapoal's noteworthy wineries and vineyards are located toward the east of the region, in the foothills of the Andes, away from the warmer valley floor. This is an area for Cabernet Sauvignon vines, whereas closer to the coast the ocean breezes flow through the coastal range, and there are more Carménère vines.
