= Google Street View in Chile =

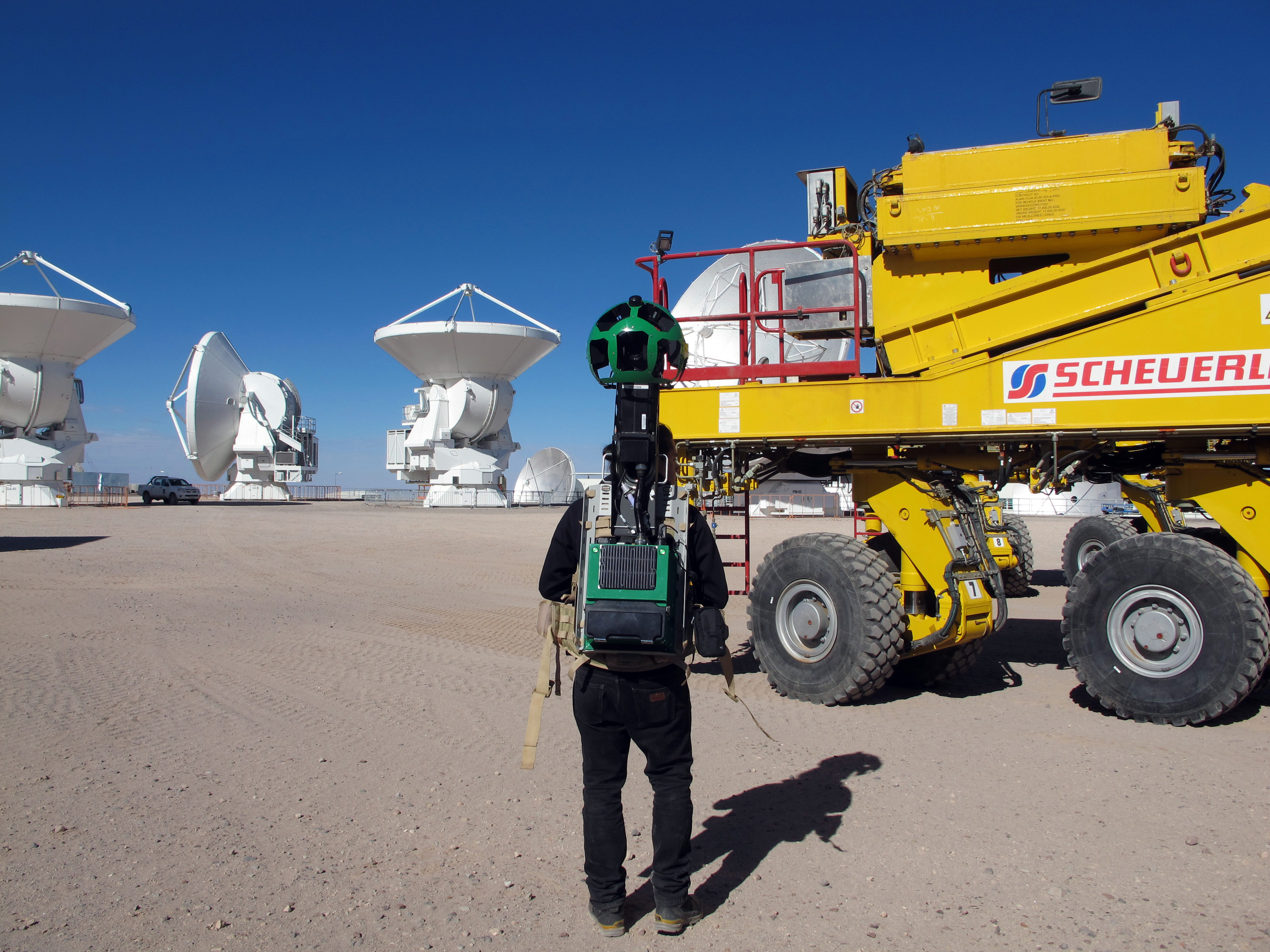
Google Street View at ALMA.

Google's Street View program in Chile began with the filming of streets and roads in January 2012. On September 25, 2012, parts of the country were made available online, including Santiago, Valparaíso, Viña del Mar and Concepción. During 2013 and 2014 many more cities and roads were added. In March 2015 coverage was extended to the country's southernmost region of Magallanes (only accessible by road via Argentina). In December 2015 Chile's southernmost city, Puerto Williams, was added.

As of December 2015, coverage is high, with over seven-tenths of all cities —or over three-quarters of the country's population— having most of its streets photographed.

== Timeline of introductions ==
| Date | Major locations added |
|---|---|
| Tuesday, September 25, 2012 | Greater Santiago (including ski resorts), Greater Valparaíso (including Limache) and Greater Concepción. |
| Thursday, June 13, 2013 | Tourist spots. |
| Wednesday, August 14, 2013 | Arica, Iquique, Calama, San Pedro de Atacama, Antofagasta, Taltal, Chañaral, Caldera, Copiapó, Vallenar, La Serena, Coquimbo, Ovalle, Andacollo, Combarbalá, Illapel, Salamanca, San Felipe, Los Andes, Quintero, Quillota, Concón, Casablanca, San Antonio, Rancagua, Curicó, Talca, Linares, Los Ángeles, Nacimiento, Temuco, Osorno, Puerto Varas, Puerto Montt, Calbuco, Ancud, Coyhaique, Aysén, Cochrane, expanded coverage of Greater Santiago and more locations. |
| Monday, April 21, 2014 | Angol, Contulmo, Collipulli, Los Sauces, Traiguen, Victoria, Galvarino, Temuco, Villarrica, Pucón, Curarrehue, Chanco, Cobquecura, Constitución, Melipilla, Santa Cruz, Panguipulli, Lanco, Mariquina, Valdivia, Paillaco, Castro, Quellón and more locations. |
| Wednesday, June 4, 2014 | More locations. |
| Wednesday, January 21, 2015 | More locations, including Pichilemu and Bulnes, and expanded coverage of existing locations. |
| Friday, March 6, 2015 | Punta Arenas, Puerto Natales, and hamlet of Cerro Castillo. |
| Tuesday, April 7, 2015 | Roads around Torres del Paine National Park. |
| Tuesday, May 19, 2015 | Expanded coverage of existing locations, including, Santa María, Lo Miranda, Loncoche, Pitrufquén, and Victoria. |
| Monday, June 8, 2015 | Expanded coverage of existing locations, including, Curanilahue, La Unión, Machalí, Tocopilla, Cañete, Laja, Río Bueno, Nueva Imperial, Vicuña, Cabrero, Graneros, and Panguipulli. |
| Wednesday, December 2, 2015 | Puerto Williams, and expanded coverage of existing locations, including, Puerto Aisén, Pucón, Hualqui, Quinta de Tilcoco, and Monte Patria. |

== Coverage ==
Coverage as of July 2022 in cities, which account for 83% of the country's total population:

| Coverage | Settlements | Population | % |
|---|---|---|---|
| High | 171 | 11,467,782 | 91.45 |
| Medium | 54 | 611,478 | 4.88 |
| Low | 52 | 344,492 | 2.75 |
| None | 28 | 115,526 | 0.92 |
| Cities | 305 | 12,539,278 | 100.00 |
| Other settlements | 36,978 | 2,577,157 | 17.05 |
| Total population (2017) | 37,217 | 17,574,003 | 100.00 |

| Region | Coverage | Cities |
|---|---|---|
| Arica and Parinacota | High | Arica, Putre. |
| Arica and Parinacota | Low | Camarones. |
| Arica and Parinacota | None | General Lagos. |
| Tarapacá | High | Iquique, Alto Hospicio, Pozo Almonte. |
| Tarapacá | Medium | Huara, La Tirana, Camiña, Pica. |
| Tarapacá | Low | Colchane. |
| Antofagasta | High | Antofagasta, Calama, Tocopilla, Taltal, Mejillones, María Elena. |
| Antofagasta | Medium | San Pedro de Atacama, Sierra Gorda. |
| Antofagasta | Low | Chuquicamata, Toconao, Ollagüe. |
| Antofagasta | None | Estación Zaldívar. |
| Atacama | High | Copiapó, Vallenar, Caldera, Chañaral, Tierra Amarilla, Diego de Almagro, Huasco. |
| Atacama | Medium | El Salvador, Freirina, Alto del Carmen. |
| Atacama | None | Carrizal Bajo. |
| Coquimbo | High | Coquimbo, La Serena, Tongoy, Ovalle, Illapel, Vicuña, Los Vilos, Andacollo, Combarbalá, Monte Patria, Punitaqui. |
| Coquimbo | Medium | Salamanca, El Palqui, Canela, La Higuera. |
| Coquimbo | Low | Paihuano |
| Valparaíso | High | Viña del Mar, Valparaíso, Quilpué, Villa Alemana, San Antonio, Los Andes, San Felipe, Quillota, La Calera, Limache, Olmué, Concón, Quintero, La Ligua, Llaillay, Cartagena, Casablanca, Cabildo, Nogales, El Quisco, San Esteban, Putaendo, Catemu, Santa María, Algarrobo, Calle Larga, Santo Domingo, El Tabo, Las Cruces, Señor Pobre Béjares, Papudo, Zapallar. |
| Valparaíso | Medium | Placilla de Peñuelas, Las Ventanas, Rinconada, Puchuncaví. |
| Valparaíso | Low | La Cruz, El Melón, Hijuelas, Villa Los Almendros, Catapilco. |
| Valparaíso | None | Petorca, Isla de Pascua. |
| Santiago | High | Puente Alto, Maipú, La Florida, Las Condes, San Bernardo, Peñalolén, Santiago, Pudahuel, La Pintana, El Bosque, Ñuñoa, Cerro Navia, Recoleta, Renca, Conchalí, La Granja, Estación Central, Quilicura, Providencia, Pedro Aguirre Cerda, Lo Espejo, Macul, Lo Prado, Quinta Normal, San Joaquín, La Reina, San Ramón, La Cisterna, Vitacura, San Miguel, Huechuraba, Lo Barnechea, Cerrillos, Independencia, Peñaflor, Colina, Talagante, Buin, Padre Hurtado, Curacaví, Lampa, Isla de Maipo, San José de Maipo, Tiltil, Pirque, La Obra-Las Vertientes, La Islita, Alhué, El Monte, Paine, Batuco, Alto Jahuel, Melipilla. |
| O'Higgins | High | Rancagua, Rengo, Machalí, Graneros, San Vicente de Taguatagua, Santa Cruz, Chimbarongo, Lo Miranda, Nancagua, Quinta de Tilcoco, Gultro, San Francisco de Mostazal, Codegua, Requínoa, Doñihue, Olivar, Coltauco, Coínco, Rosario. |
| O'Higgins | Medium | San Fernando, Malloa, Punta Diamante, Litueche Navidad. |
| O'Higgins | Low | Pichilemu, Peumo, Las Cabras, Palmilla, Peralillo, Placilla, Pichidegua, Lolol, Chépica. |
| O'Higgins | None | Paredones, La Estrella, Marchihue, Pumanque. |
| Maule | High | Talca, Curicó, Linares, Constitución, Cauquenes, Molina, San Javier, Villa Francia, Culenar, Teno, Rauco, Sagrada Familia, Romeral. |
| Maule | Low | Parral, Longaví, Villa Alegre, Hualañé, Licantén, San Clemente, Maule, Vichuquén, Curepto, Empedrado, Pencahue, Chanco, Pelluhue, Yerbas Buenas. |
| Maule | None | Río Claro, Colbún, Pelarco, San Rafael, Retiro. |
| Ñuble | High | Coihueco, Chillán Viejo, San Carlos, Chillán, Coelemu. |
| Ñuble | Medium | Quillón, Portezuelo, Ninhue, Quillón, Ránquil. |
| Ñuble | Low | Quirihue, Bulnes, San Fabián, Pemuco, Pinto, Cobquecura, San Nicolás, San Ignacio, Treguaco. |
| Ñuble | None | Ñiquén, Yungay, El Carmen. |
| Biobío | High | Concepción, Talcahuano, Los Ángeles, Hualpén, Chiguayante, San Pedro de la Paz, Coronel, Lota, Penco, Tomé, Curanilahue, Mulchén, Nacimiento, Cañete, Arauco, Lebu, La Laja, Hualqui, Cabrero, Yumbel, Santa Juana, Santa Bárbara, San Rosendo. |
| Biobío | Medium | Negrete, Los Álamos |
| Biobío | Low | Huépil, Tucapel, Monte Águila, Florida, Quilaco, Antuco. |
| Biobío | None | Contulmo, Tirúa, Quilleco, Alto Bío Bío. |
| Araucanía | High | Temuco, Angol, Padre Las Casas, Villarrica, Victoria, Nueva Imperial, Collipulli, Loncoche, Pucón, Pitrufquén, Gorbea, Freire, Labranza, Lautaro, Vilcún, Curarrehue. |
| Araucanía | Medium | Traiguén, Curacautín, Carahue, Cunco, Melipeuco, Capitán Pastene, Lumaco, Puerto Saavedra, Galvarino, Cholchol, Perquenco. |
| Araucanía | Low | Purén, Renaico, Lonquimay, Los Sauces, Teodoro Schmidt, Toltén. |
| Araucanía | None | Ercilla. |
| Los Ríos | High | Valdivia, La Unión, Río Bueno, Panguipulli, Paillaco, Los Lagos, San José de la Mariquina, Futrono. |
| Los Ríos | Medium | Lanco. |
| Los Ríos | Low | Máfil, Coñaripe. |
| Los Ríos | None | Lago Ranco, Corral, Reumén. |
| Los Lagos | High | Puerto Montt, Osorno, Castro, Puerto Varas, Quellón, Dalcahue, Calbuco, Chaitén, Futaleufú, Palena, Quemchi. |
| Los Lagos | Medium | Ancud, Chonchi, Alerce, Curaco de Vélez, Queilén, Quinchao. |
| Los Lagos | Low | Frutillar, Entre Lagos, Los Muermos, Llanquihue, Ensenada, Maullín. |
| Los Lagos | None | Purranque, Puerto Octay, Río Negro, Fresia, San Pablo, San Juan de la Costa, Cochamó, Hualaihué, Puqueldón. |
| Aisén | High | Coihaique, Puerto Aisén, Chile Chico, Cochrane, Tortel, Puerto Cisnes, O'Higgins. |
| Aisén | Medium | Puerto Chacabuco, La Junta. |
| Aisén | None | Melinka, Lago Verde. |
| Magallanes | Medium | Punta Arenas, Villa Tehuelches. |
| Magallanes | Low | Puerto Natales, Puerto Williams, Torres del Paine. |
| Magallanes | None | Porvenir, San Gregorio, Cerro Sombrero, Timaukel. |

== See also ==
- Google Street View in Latin America
