= Lo Miranda =

Coordinates: 34.19°S 70.89°W

- City
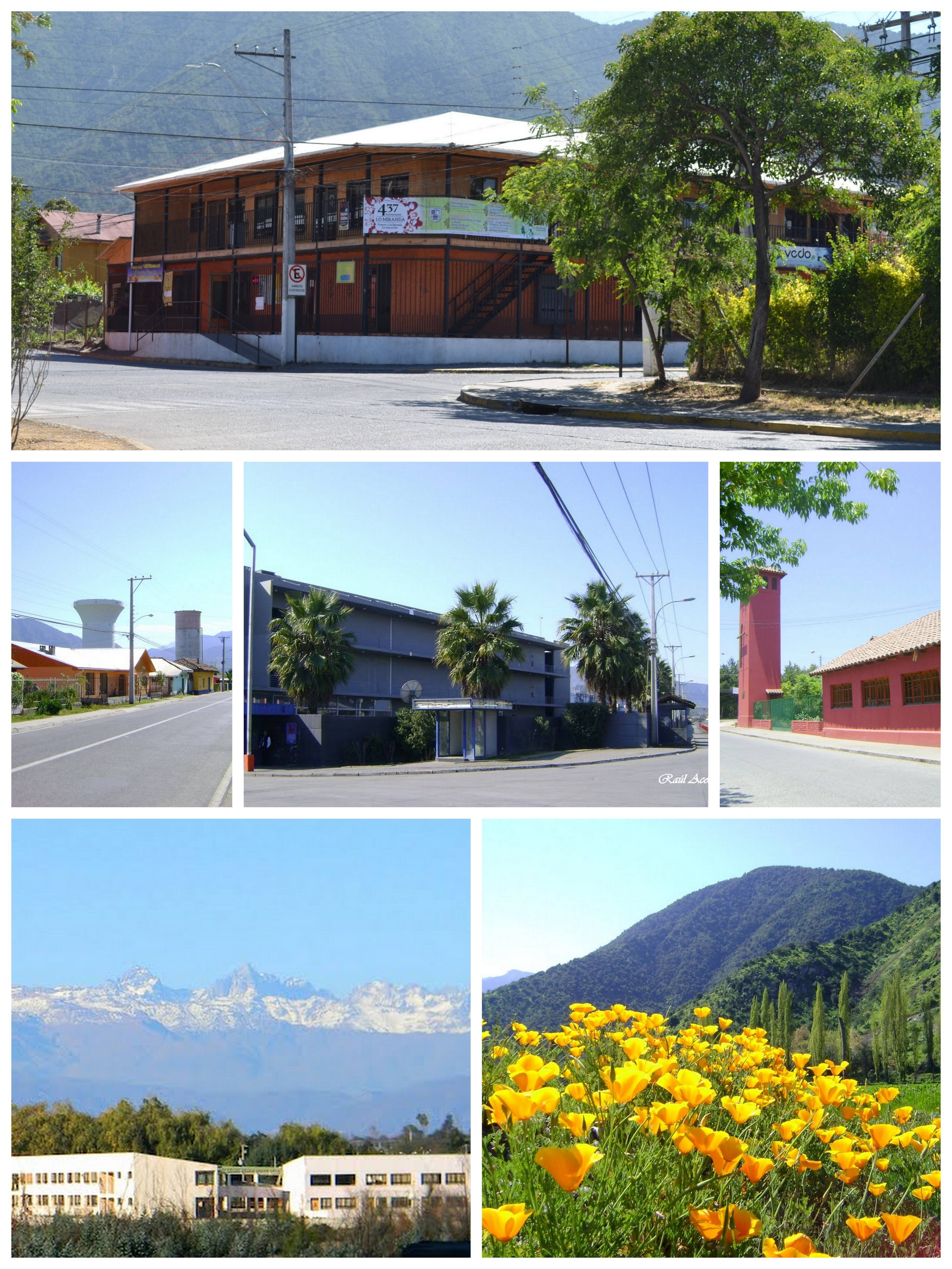
- Interactive map of Lo Miranda
- Country: Chile
- Region: (O'Higgins Region) O'Higgins
- Province: Cachapoal
- Commune: Doñihue
- Established: October 15, 1577
- Elevation: 407 m (1,335 ft)

Population (2017 Census)
  - Total: 11.095
- Demonym: Mirandino
- Time zone: UTC-4 (CLT)
  - Summer (DST): UTC-3 (CLST)

Lo Miranda is a Chilean city, located in the commune of Doñihue, O'Higgins Region.

== History ==
Lo Miranda is named after Pedro de Miranda y Rueda, who was given from the Governor of Chile Rodrigo de Quiroga an encomienda (the Encomienda de Copequén) which comprises the territory in which Lo Miranda was established in 1577. His son, Pedro de Miranda y Rueda, inherited the land and founded Lo Miranda on October 15, 1577.

Lo Miranda was named a "villa" in 1897.

== Demographics ==
According to data from the last census carried out in 2017, Lo Miranda increased its population, in relation to the previous census by 32%, reaching 11,095 inhabitants.

In the town its population has increased, along with its territorial expansion both urban and rural.

== Economy ==
Lo Miranda is located in a mainly agricultural area, it is also known for its poultry industry, as the slaughtering plant of Agrosuper is located there. Additionally, the Mirandinos sell chamantos and Chacolí candies.

== Architecture ==
Most of the houses were constructed with adobe and mud, with clay tiles. The main square, several stores and the local church are located in the historical centre of the town. The local church was created on August 15, 1936 by the Bishop of Rancagua, Monsignor Rafael Lira Infante.

== Monument of Lo Miranda ==
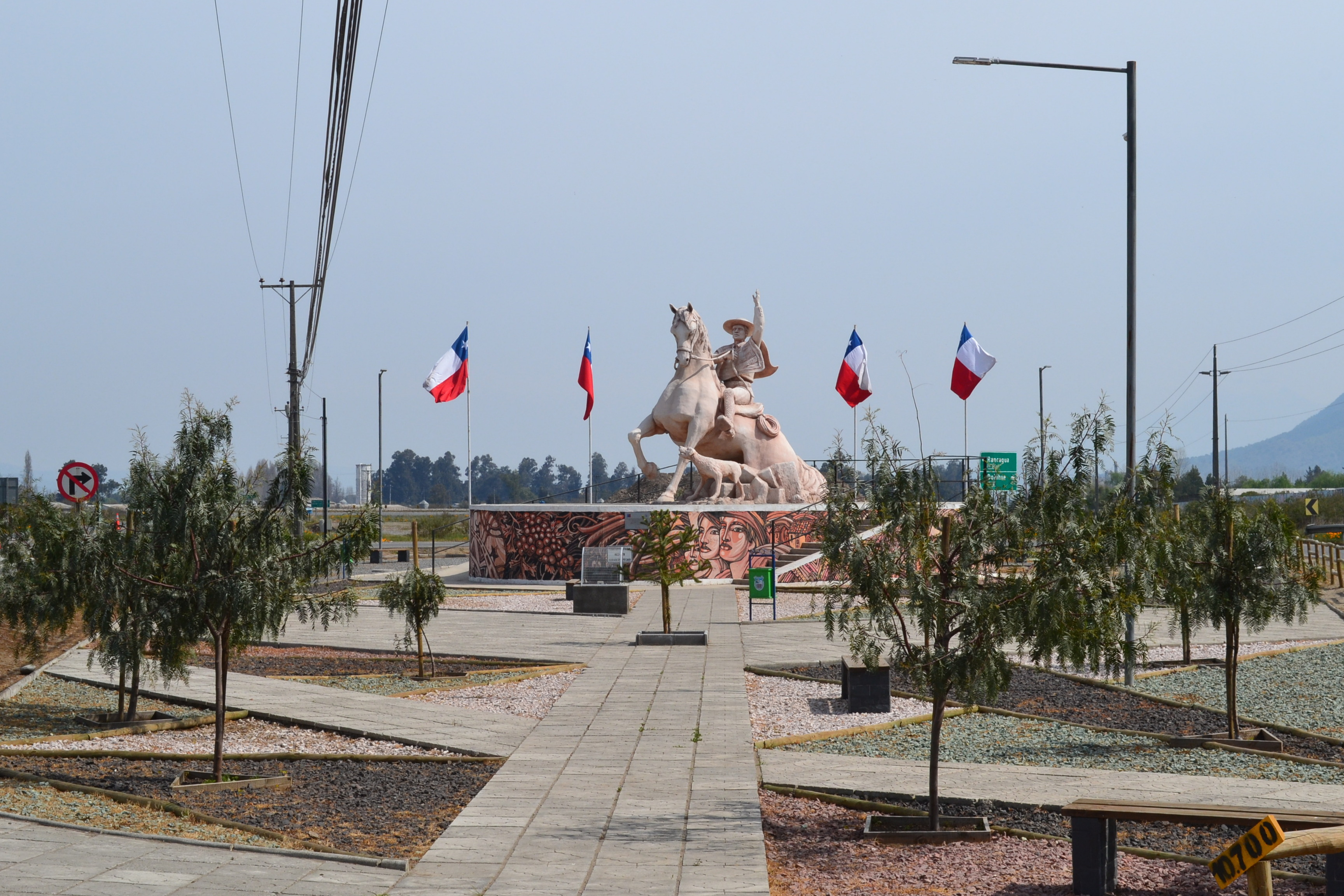
Monument to the Chilean Huaso

On August 20, 2016 the Mayor of the commune, Boris Acuña González, together with the Mayor of the Region of Libertador General Bernardo O'Higgins Pablo Silva Amaya and the Honorable City Council, inaugurated the sculpture in the Portal of access to the commune, at the entrance of the town of Lo Miranda. Work done by the sculptor and muralist Roberto Calquin.

== Sports ==
There was a sports club founded by Agrosuper (then Super Pollo), called Súper Lo Miranda, founded on August 10, 1980.
