= Coinco =

- Town and Commune
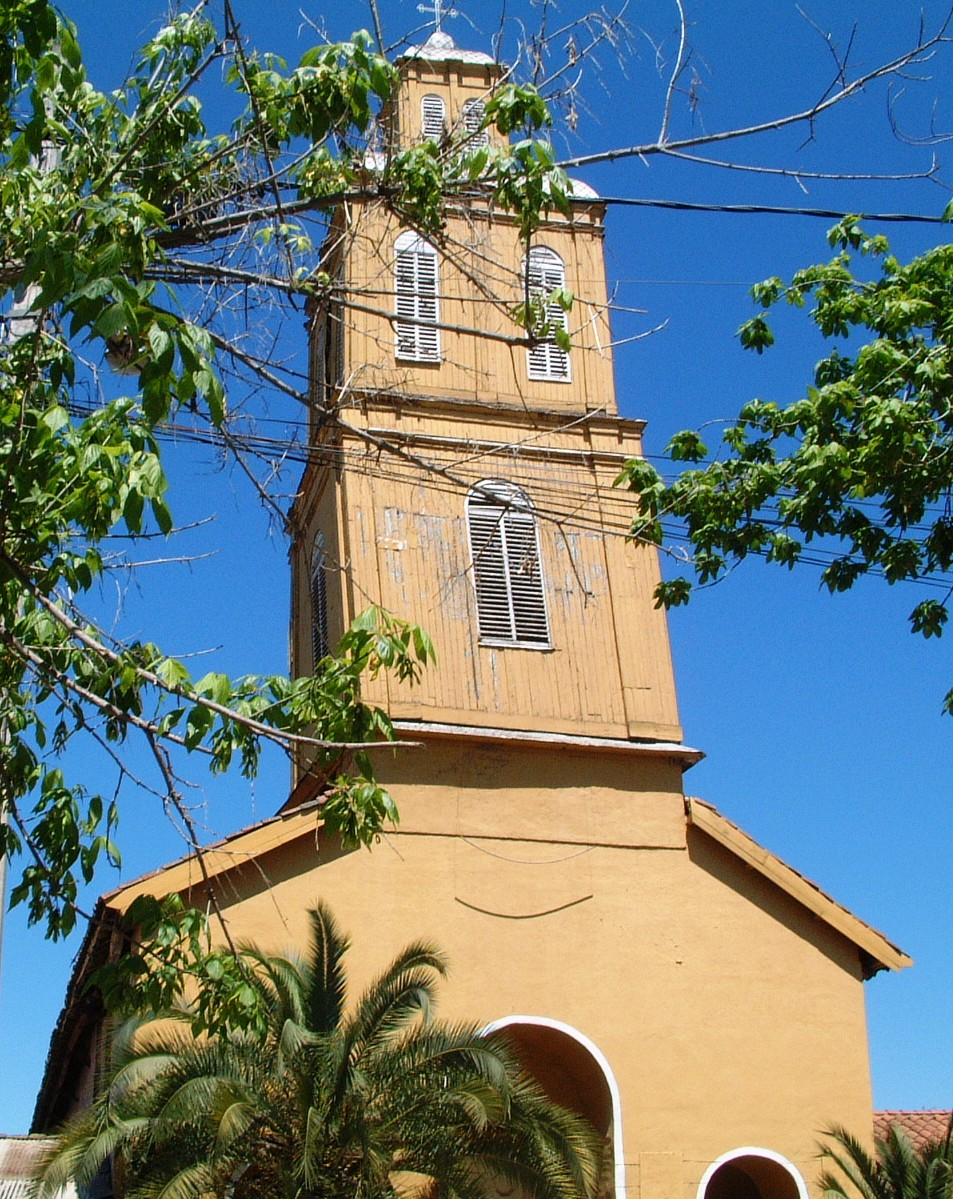
- Church of Coinco

- Map of Coinco in the O'Higgins Region Location in Chile
- Coordinates: 34°15′38″S 70°56′54″W
- Country: Chile
- Region: O'Higgins
- Province: Cachapoal

Government
  - Type: Municipality
  - Alcalde: Gregorio Valenzuela

Area
  - Total: 98.2 km^{2} (37.9 sq mi)
- Elevation: 336 m (1,102 ft)

Population (2012 Census)
  - Total: 6,709
  - Density: 68.3/km^{2} (177/sq mi)
  - Urban: 4,102
  - Rural: 2,283

Sex
  - Men: 3,293
  - Women: 3,092
- Time zone: UTC-4 (CLT)
  - Summer (DST): UTC-3 (CLST)
- Area code: (+56) 72
- Website: Municipality of Coinco

Coinco is a Chilean commune and town in Cachapoal Province, O'Higgins Region. According to the 2012 census, the commune population was 6,709 and has an area of 98.2 km^{2} (38 sq mi).

== Demographics ==
According to the 2002 census of the National Statistics Institute, Coinco has 6,385 inhabitants (3,293 men and 3,092 women). Of these, 4,102 (64.2%) lived in urban areas and 2,283 (35.8%) in rural areas. The population grew by 9.7% (562 persons) between the 1992 and 2002 censuses.

== Administration ==
As a commune, Coinco is a third-level administrative division of Chile administered by a municipal council, headed by an alcalde who is directly elected every four years. The 2008-2012 alcalde is Gregorio Valenzuela.

Within the electoral divisions of Chile, Coinco is represented in the Chamber of Deputies by Eugenio Bauer (UDI) and Ricardo Rincón (PDC) as part of the 33rd electoral district, together with Mostazal, Graneros, Codegua, Machalí, Requínoa, Rengo, Olivar, Doñihue, Coltauco, Quinta de Tilcoco and Malloa. The commune is represented in the Senate by Andrés Chadwick Piñera (UDI) and Juan Pablo Letelier Morel (PS) as part of the 9th senatorial constituency (O'Higgins Region).
