= Malloa =

- Town and Commune
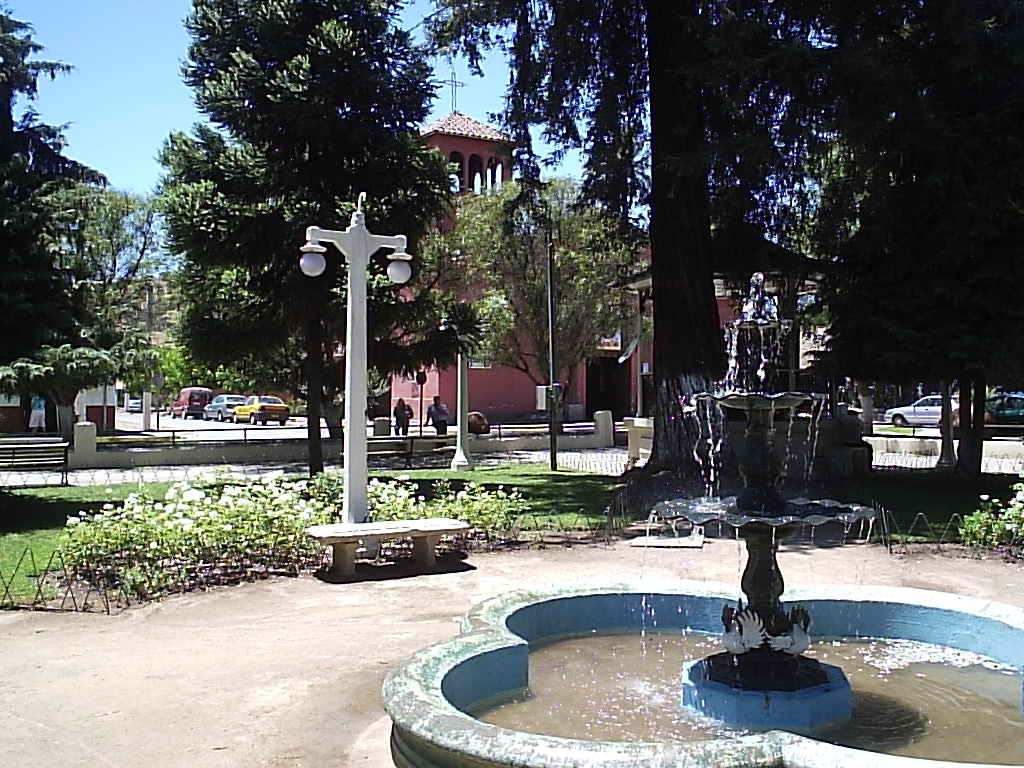

- Map of Malloa commune in the O'Higgins Region Location in Chile
- Coordinates (city): 34°26′47″S 70°56′45″W
- Country: Chile
- Region: O'Higgins Region
- Province: Cachapoal Province

Government
  - Type: Municipality

Area
  - Total: 112.6 km^{2} (43.5 sq mi)
- Elevation: 254 m (833 ft)

Population (2012 Census)
  - Total: 12,342
  - Density: 109.6/km^{2} (283.9/sq mi)
  - Urban: 4,709
  - Rural: 8,163

Sex
  - Men: 6,666
  - Women: 6,206
- Time zone: UTC-4 (CLT)
  - Summer (DST): UTC-3 (CLST)
- Area code: (+56) 72
- Website: Municipality of Malloa

Malloa (from Mapudungún mallohue, "place of the white clay") is a Chilean commune and town in Cachapoal Province, O'Higgins Region.

== Demographics ==
According to the 2002 census of the National Statistics Institute, Malloa spans an area of 112.6 km^{2} (43 sq mi) and has 12,872 inhabitants (6,666 men and 6,206 women). Of these, 4,709 (36.6%) lived in urban areas and 8,163 (63.4%) in rural areas. The population grew by 5.1% (620 persons) between the 1992 and 2002 censuses.

== Administration ==
As a commune, Malloa is a third-level administrative division of Chile administered by a municipal council, headed by an alcalde who is directly elected every four years.

Within the electoral divisions of Chile, Malloa is represented in the Chamber of Deputies by Eugenio Bauer (UDI) and Ricardo Rincón (PDC) as part of the 33rd electoral district, together with Mostazal, Graneros, Codegua, Machalí, Requínoa, Rengo, Olivar, Doñihue, Coinco, Coltauco and Quinta de Tilcoco. The commune is represented in the Senate by Andrés Chadwick Piñera (UDI) and Juan Pablo Letelier Morel (PS) as part of the 9th senatorial constituency (O'Higgins Region).
