= Machalí =

- City and Commune
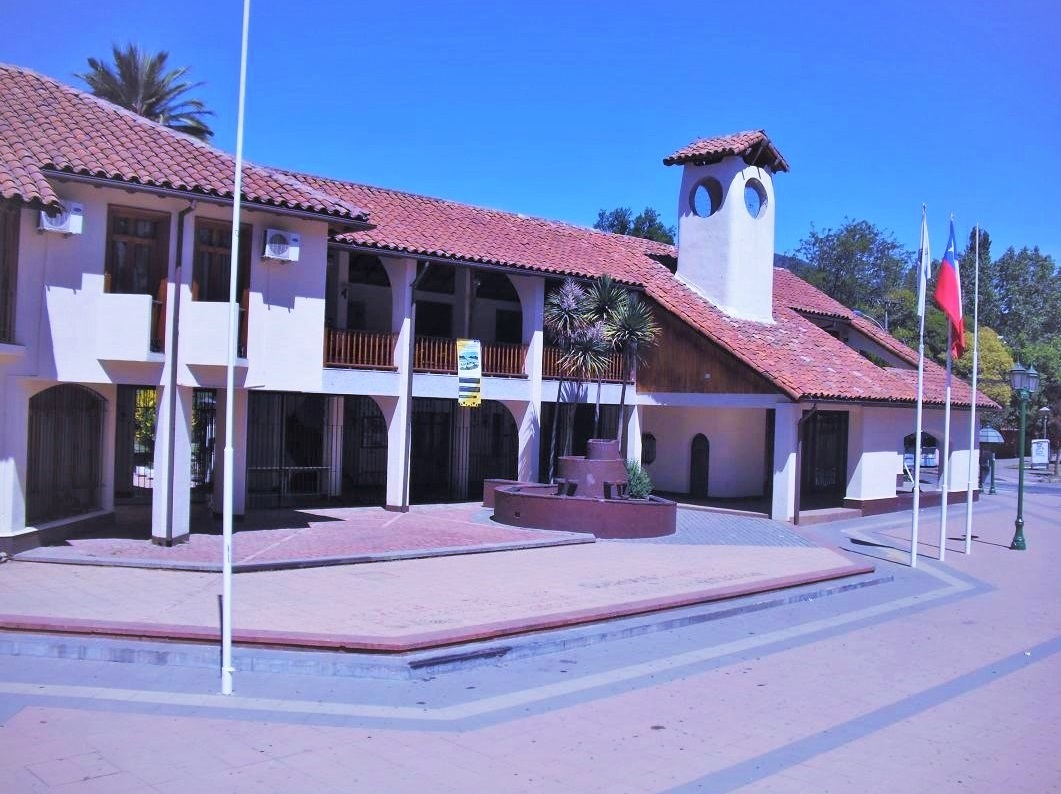
- Municipalidad

- Map of Machalí commune in the O'Higgins Region Location in Chile
- Coordinates (city): 34°10′57″S 70°39′05″W
- Country: Chile
- Region: O'Higgins Region
- Province: Cachapoal Province

Government
  - Type: Municipality
  - Alcalde: Juan Carlos Abud

Area
  - Total: 2,586 km^{2} (998 sq mi)
- Elevation: 552 m (1,811 ft)

Population (2012 Census)
  - Total: 42,572
  - Density: 16.46/km^{2} (42.64/sq mi)
  - Urban: 26,852
  - Rural: 1,776

Sex
  - Men: 14,297
  - Women: 14,331
- Time zone: UTC-4 (CLT)
  - Summer (DST): UTC-3 (CLST)
- Postal code: 85002480
- Area code: (+56) 72
- Website: Municipality of Machalí

Machalí is a Chilean commune and city in Cachapoal Province, O'Higgins Region.

== Demographics ==
According to the 2002 census of the National Statistics Institute, Machalí spans an area of 2,586 km^{2} (998 sq mi) and has 28,628 inhabitants (14,297 men and 14,331 women). Of these, 26,852 (93.8%) lived in urban areas and 1,776 (6.2%) in rural areas. The population grew by 18.5% (4,476 persons) between the 1992 and 2002 censuses.

== Administration ==
As a commune, Machalí is a third-level administrative division of Chile administered by a municipal council, headed by an alcalde who is directly elected every four years. The 2008-2012 alcalde is José Miguel Urrutia.

Within the electoral divisions of Chile, Machalí is represented in the Chamber of Deputies by Eugenio Bauer (UDI) and Ricardo Rincón (PDC) as part of the 33rd electoral district, together with Mostazal, Graneros, Codegua, Requínoa, Rengo, Olivar, Doñihue, Coinco, Coltauco, Quinta de Tilcoco and Malloa. The commune is represented in the Senate by Andrés Chadwick Piñera (UDI) and Juan Pablo Letelier Morel (PS) as part of the 9th senatorial constituency (O'Higgins Region).
