= Requínoa =

- City and Commune
- Flag Coat of arms Map of Requínoa commune in the O'Higgins Region Location in Chile
- Coordinates (city): 34°16′43″S 70°48′42″W
- Country: Chile
- Region: O'Higgins Region
- Province: Cachapoal Province

Government
  - Type: Municipality
  - Alcalde: Antonio Silva Vargas (Ind.)

Area
  - Total: 673.3 km^{2} (260.0 sq mi)
- Elevation: 416 m (1,365 ft)

Population (2012 Census)
  - Total: 26,089
  - Density: 38.75/km^{2} (100.4/sq mi)
  - Urban 2002: 11,167
  - Rural 2002: 10,994

Sex 2002
  - Men: 11,378
  - Women: 10,783
- Time zone: UTC-4 (CLT)
  - Summer (DST): UTC-3 (CLST)
- Area code: 56 + 72
- Website: Municipality of Requínoa

Requínoa (Spanish pronunciation: [reˈkinoa]) is a Chilean commune and city in Cachapoal Province, O'Higgins Region.

== Demographics ==
According to the 2002 census of the National Statistics Institute, Requínoa spans an area of 673.3 km^{2} (260 sq mi) and had 22,161 inhabitants (11,378 men and 10,783 women). Of these, 11,167 (50.4%) lived in urban areas and 10,994 (49.6%) in rural areas. The population grew by 14% (2,729 persons) between the 1992 and 2002 censuses. The 2012 census reported 26,089 inhabitants, an increase of 17.7% from 2002 to 2012.

== Administration ==
As a commune, Requínoa is a third-level administrative division of Chile administered by a municipal council, headed by an alcalde who is directly elected every four years. The 2008-2012 alcalde is Antonio Silva Vargas (Ind.). The council has the following members:

- Daniel Elías Martínez Higueras (PS)
- María Eliana Berríos Bustos (ILE)
- Rolando Andrés Guajardo Arévalo (ILC)
- Hugo Alejandro Núñez Guerrero (UDI)
- Sergio Cabezas Díaz (RN)
- Francisco Odeón Caro Godoy (Ind.)

Within the electoral divisions of Chile, Requínoa is represented in the Chamber of Deputies by Eugenio Bauer (UDI) and Ricardo Rincón (PDC) as part of the 33rd electoral district, together with Mostazal, Graneros, Codegua, Machalí, Rengo, Olivar, Doñihue, Coinco, Coltauco, Quinta de Tilcoco and Malloa. The commune is represented in the Senate by Andrés Chadwick Piñera (UDI) and Juan Pablo Letelier Morel (PS) as part of the 9th senatorial constituency (O'Higgins Region).
