= Coltauco =

- Town and Commune
- Map of Coltauco in the O'Higgins Region Location in Chile
- Coordinates: 34°18′0″S 71°06′0″W
- Country: Chile
- Region: O'Higgins Region
- Province: Cachapoal Province

Government
  - Type: Municipality
  - Alcalde: Ruben Jorquera Vidal

Area
  - Total: 224.7 km^{2} (86.8 sq mi)
- Elevation: 244 m (801 ft)

Population (2012 Census)
  - Total: 17,918
  - Density: 79.74/km^{2} (206.5/sq mi)
  - Urban: 6,958
  - Rural: 9,270

Sex
  - Men: 8,239
  - Women: 7,989
- Time zone: UTC-4 (CLT)
  - Summer (DST): UTC-3 (CLST)
- Area code: (+56) 72
- Website: Municipality of Coltauco

Coltauco is a Chilean commune and town in Cachapoal Province, O'Higgins Region. According to the 2002 census, the commune population was 16,228 and has an area of 224.7 km^{2} (86.8 sq mi).

== Demographics ==
According to the 2002 census of the National Statistics Institute, Coltauco spans an area of 224.7 km^{2} (87 sq mi) and has 16,228 inhabitants (8,239 men and 7,989 women). Of these, 6,958 (42.9%) lived in urban areas and 9,270 (57.1%) in rural areas. The population grew by 6.7% (1,023 persons) between the 1992 and 2002 censuses.

== Administration ==
As a commune, Coltauco is a third-level administrative division of Chile administered by a municipal council, headed by an alcalde who is directly elected every four years. The 2012-2016 alcalde is Ruben Jorquera Vidal.

Within the electoral divisions of Chile, Coltauco is represented in the Chamber of Deputies by Eugenio Bauer (UDI) and Ricardo Rincón (PDC) as part of the 33rd electoral district, together with Mostazal, Graneros, Codegua, Machalí, Requínoa, Rengo, Olivar, Doñihue, Coinco, Quinta de Tilcoco and Malloa. The commune is represented in the Senate by Andrés Chadwick Piñera (UDI) and Juan Pablo Letelier Morel (PS) as part of the 9th senatorial constituency (O'Higgins Region).
