= Quinta de Tilcoco =

- Commune
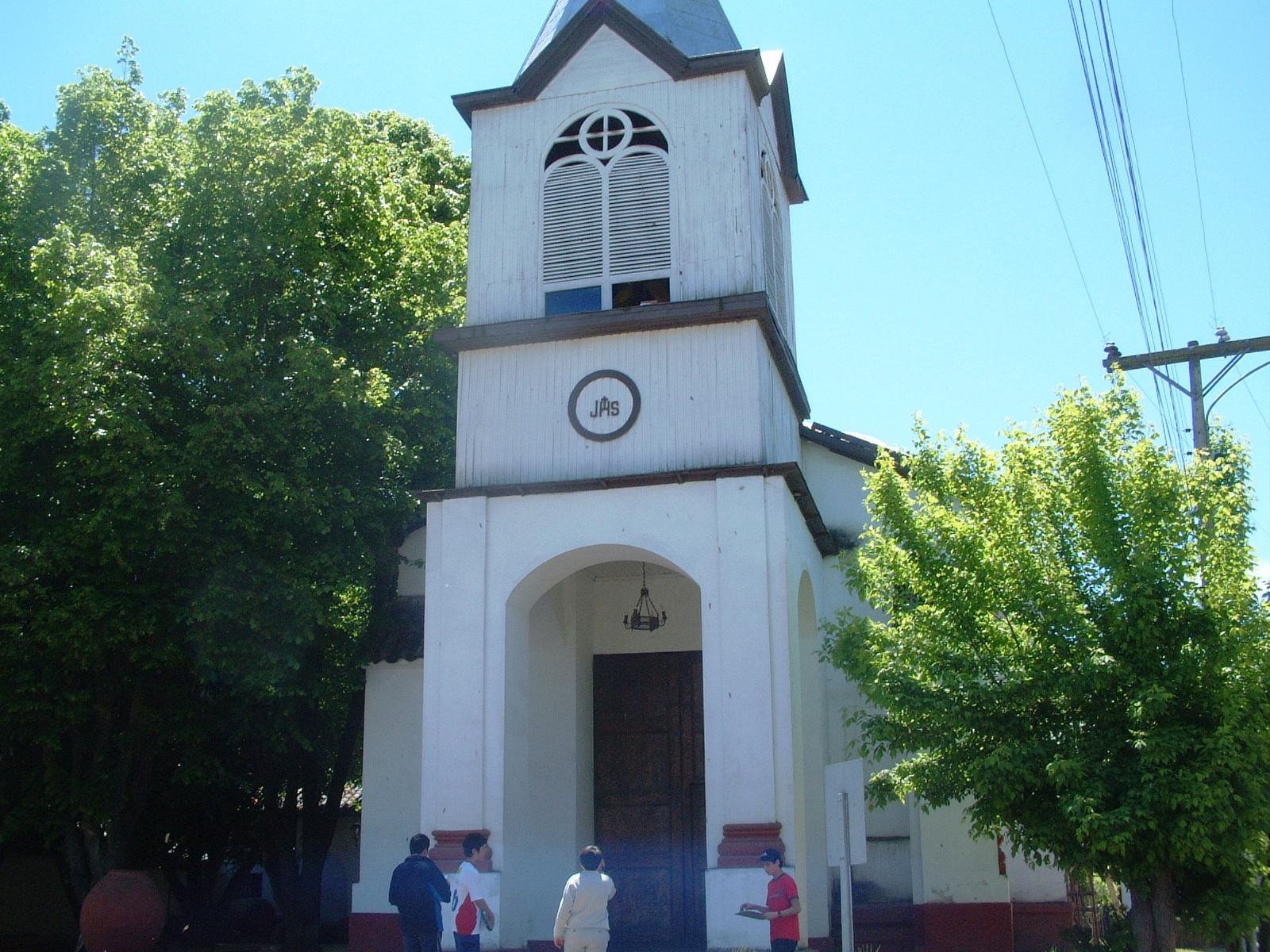
- Iglesia de Guacarhue

- Map of the Quinta de Tilcoco commune in the O'Higgins Region Location in Chile
- Coordinates (city): 34°21′17″S 70°57′49″W
- Country: Chile
- Region: O'Higgins Region
- Province: Cachapoal Province

Government
  - Type: Municipality
  - Alcalde: Nelson Patricio Barrios

Area
  - Total: 93.2 km^{2} (36.0 sq mi)
- Elevation: 276 m (906 ft)

Population (2012 Census)
  - Total: 12,379
  - Density: 133/km^{2} (344/sq mi)
  - Urban: 5,850
  - Rural: 5,530

Sex
  - Men: 5,811
  - Women: 5,569
- Time zone: UTC-4 (CLT)
  - Summer (DST): UTC-3 (CLST)
- Area code: (+56) 72
- Website: Municipality of Quinta de Tilcoco

Quinta de Tilcoco is a Chilean commune and city in Cachapoal Province, O'Higgins Region.

== Demographics ==
According to the 2002 census of the National Statistics Institute, Quinta de Tilcoco spans an area of 93.2 km^{2} (36 sq mi) and has 11,380 inhabitants (5,811 men and 5,569 women). Of these, 5,850 (51.4%) lived in urban areas and 5,530 (48.6%) in rural areas. The population grew by 5.5% (598 persons) between the 1992 and 2002 censuses.

== Administration ==
As a commune, Quinta de Tilcoco is a third-level administrative division of Chile administered by a municipal council, headed by an alcalde who is directly elected every four years. The 2008-2002 alcalde is Nelson Patricio Barrios.

Within the electoral divisions of Chile, Quinta de Tilcoco is represented in the Chamber of Deputies by Eugenio Bauer (UDI) and Ricardo Rincón (PDC) as part of the 33rd electoral district, together with Mostazal, Graneros, Codegua, Machalí, Requínoa, Rengo, Olivar, Doñihue, Coinco, Coltauco and Malloa. The commune is represented in the Senate by Andrés Chadwick Piñera (UDI) and Juan Pablo Letelier Morel (PS) as part of the 9th senatorial constituency (O'Higgins Region).
