= Olivar =

- Commune
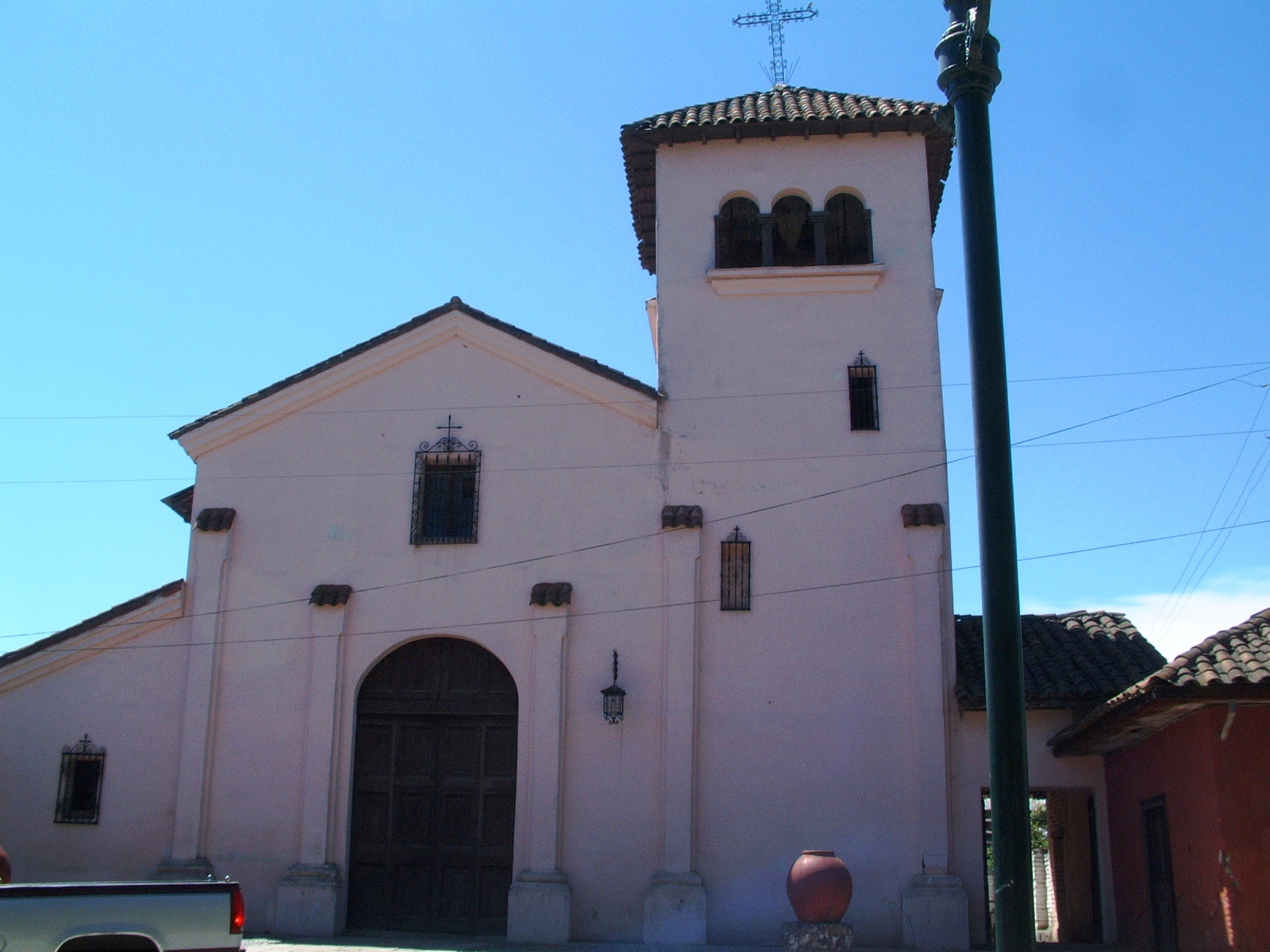
- Our Lady of Mount Carmel Parish (Parroquia Nuestra Señora del Carmen)

- Coat of arms Map of the Olivar commune in O'Higgins Region Location in Chile
- Coordinates: 34.233°S 70.883°W
- Country: Chile
- Region: O'Higgins
- Province: Cachapoal

Government
  - Type: Municipality
  - Alcalde: Maria Estrella Montero Carrasco

Area
  - Total: 44.6 km^{2} (17.2 sq mi)
- Elevation: 389 m (1,276 ft)

Population (2012 Census)
  - Total: 13,033
  - Density: 292/km^{2} (757/sq mi)
  - Urban: 7,898
  - Rural: 4,437

Sex
  - Men: 6,244
  - Women: 6,091
- Time zone: UTC-4 (CLT)
  - Summer (DST): UTC-3 (CLST)
- Area code: (+56) 72
- Website: Municipality of Olivar

Olivar is a commune in Chile, located in the O'Higgins Region, 10 km south of Rancagua, and administered by the municipality of Olivar. The main economic activities range from agriculture and food production, especially apples for exportation.

== Demographics ==
According to the 2002 census of the National Statistics Institute, Olivar spans an area of 44.6 km^{2} (17 sq mi) and has 12,335 inhabitants (6,244 men and 6,091 women). Of these, 7,898 (64%) lived in urban areas and 4,437 (36%) in rural areas. The population grew by 8.9% (1,003 persons) between the 1992 and 2002 censuses.

== Administration ==
As a commune, Olivar is a third-level administrative division of Chile administered by a municipal council, headed by an alcalde (mayor) who is directly elected every four years. The 2012-2016 mayor is Maria Estrella Montero Carrasco.

Within the electoral divisions of Chile, Olivar is represented in the Chamber of Deputies by Ricardo Rincón (PDC) and Felipe Letelier (PPD) as part of the 33rd electoral district, together with Mostazal, Graneros, Codegua, Machalí, Requínoa, Rengo, Doñihue, Coinco, Coltauco, Quinta de Tilcoco and Malloa. The commune is represented in the Senate by Alejandro García-Huidobro (UDI) and Juan Pablo Letelier (PS) as part of the 9th senatorial constituency (O'Higgins Region).

== Notable people ==
- José Hipólito Salas y Toro (1812–1883), bishop of Concepción.
