= Rengo =

- City and Commune
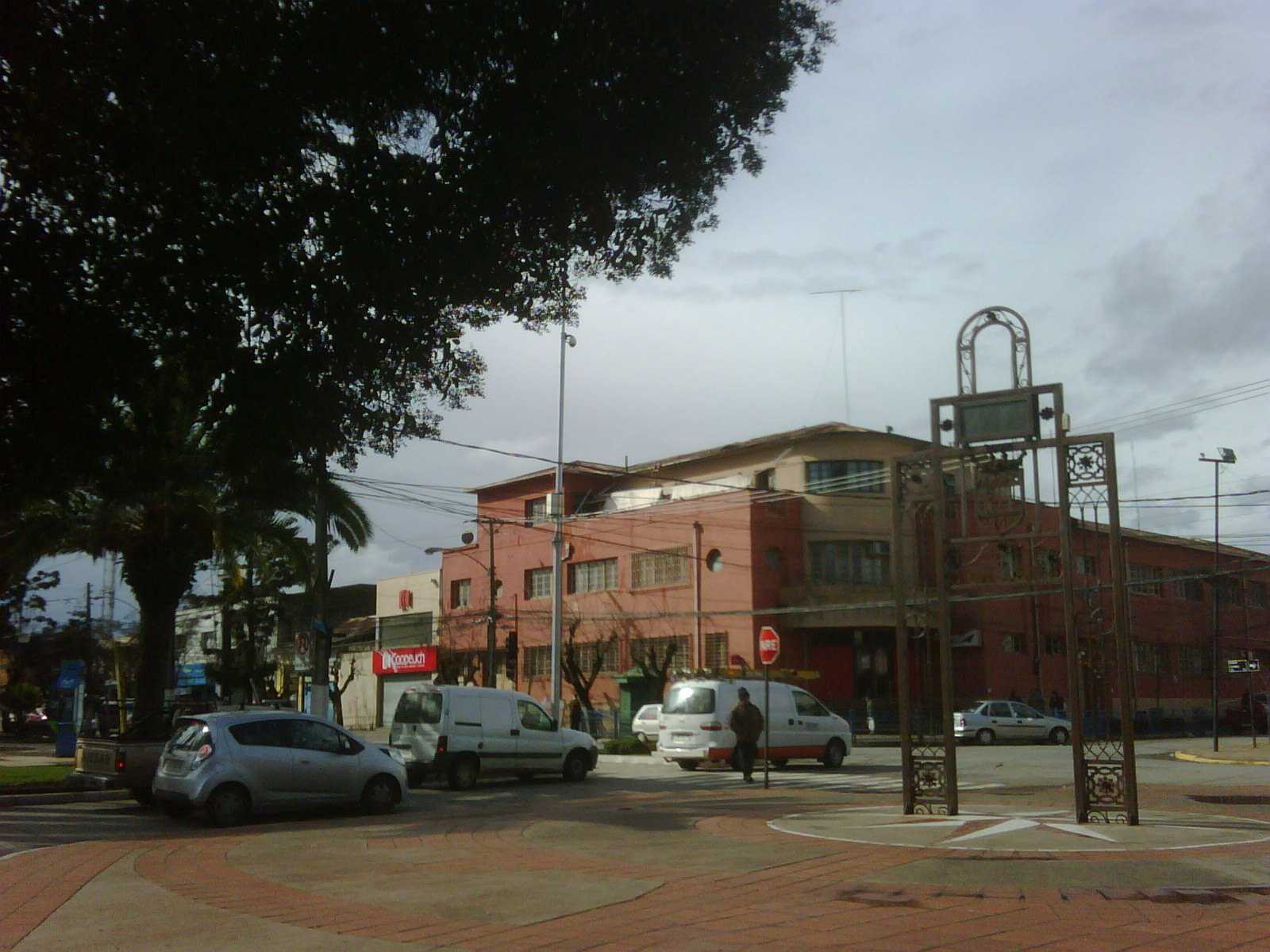

- Coat of arms Map of Rengo commune in O'Higgins Region Location in Chile
- Coordinates (city): 34°25′S 70°52′W
- Country: Chile
- Region: O'Higgins
- Province: Cachapoal
- Founded: 1695
- Founder: Tomás Marín González de Poveda

Government
  - Type: Municipality
  - Alcalde: Carlos Soto

Area
  - Total: 591.5 km^{2} (228.4 sq mi)
- Elevation: 570 m (1,870 ft)

Population (2012 Census)
  - Total: 55,757
  - Density: 94.26/km^{2} (244.1/sq mi)
  - Urban: 37,075
  - Rural: 13,755
- Demonym(s): Renguino,-a

Sex
  - Men: 25,311
  - Women: 25,519
- Time zone: UTC-4 (CLT)
  - Summer (DST): UTC-3 (CLST)
- Area code: +56 72
- Website: www.municipalidadrengo.cl (in Spanish)

Rengo is a city and commune located in the Zona Central of Chile, situated in the Cachapoal Province of the O'Higgins Region at a distance of 28 km (17 mi) south of the city of Rancagua and 114 km (71 mi) south of the national capital Santiago. It was named after the courageous Toqui Rengo for his particular bravery at the Battle of Lagunillas.

== Demographics ==
According to the 2002 census of the National Statistics Institute, Rengo spans an area of 591.5 km^{2} (228 sq mi) and has 50,830 inhabitants (25,311 men and 25,519 women). Of these, 37,075 (72.9%) lived in urban areas and 13,755 (27.1%) in rural areas. The population grew by 16.5% (7,213 persons) between the 1992 and 2002 censuses.

== Administration ==
As a commune, Rengo is a third-level administrative division of Chile administered by a municipal council, headed by an alcalde who is directly elected every four years.

Within the electoral divisions of Chile, Rengo is represented in the Chamber of Deputies by Felipe Letelier (PPD) and Ricardo Rincón (PDC) as part of the 33rd electoral district, together with Mostazal, Graneros, Codegua, Machalí, Requínoa, Olivar, Doñihue, Coinco, Coltauco, Quinta de Tilcoco and Malloa. The commune is represented in the Senate by Alejandro Garcia-Huidobro (UDI) and Juan Pablo Letelier Morel (PS) as part of the 9th senatorial constituency (O'Higgins Region).

== Notable people ==
- Hermes Ahumada (1911-2004), president of the Senate of Chile
- Patricio Pérez Díaz (born 1980), Chilean footballer

== Climate ==
Climate data for Rengo
Month	Jan	Feb	Mar	Apr	May	Jun	Jul	Aug	Sep	Oct	Nov	Dec	Year
Mean daily maximum °C (°F)	29.8 (85.6)	28.8 (83.8)	26.2 (79.2)	22.1 (71.8)	18.8 (65.8)	14.0 (57.2)	13.8 (56.8)	14.2 (57.6)	18.4 (65.1)	21.7 (71.1)	24.0 (75.2)	28.3 (82.9)	21.7 (71.0)
Daily mean °C (°F)	21.4 (70.5)	20.2 (68.4)	17.0 (62.6)	13.6 (56.5)	10.5 (50.9)	7.6 (45.7)	7.9 (46.2)	8.5 (47.3)	11.3 (52.3)	14.4 (57.9)	16.7 (62.1)	20.1 (68.2)	14.1 (57.4)
Mean daily minimum °C (°F)	12.8 (55.0)	11.6 (52.9)	9.0 (48.2)	6.7 (44.1)	5.4 (41.7)	2.5 (36.5)	3.2 (37.8)	3.6 (38.5)	5.0 (41.0)	7.7 (45.9)	9.5 (49.1)	11.5 (52.7)	7.4 (45.3)
Average precipitation mm (inches)	5.4 (0.21)	9.3 (0.37)	9.2 (0.36)	16.6 (0.65)	98.7 (3.89)	157.6 (6.20)	118.2 (4.65)	100.4 (3.95)	38.9 (1.53)	24.3 (0.96)	18.7 (0.74)	3.4 (0.13)	600.7 (23.64)
Average relative humidity (%)	61	62	70	76	84	85	84	84	77	74	69	60	74
Source: Bioclimatografia de Chile
