= Mostazal =

- Commune
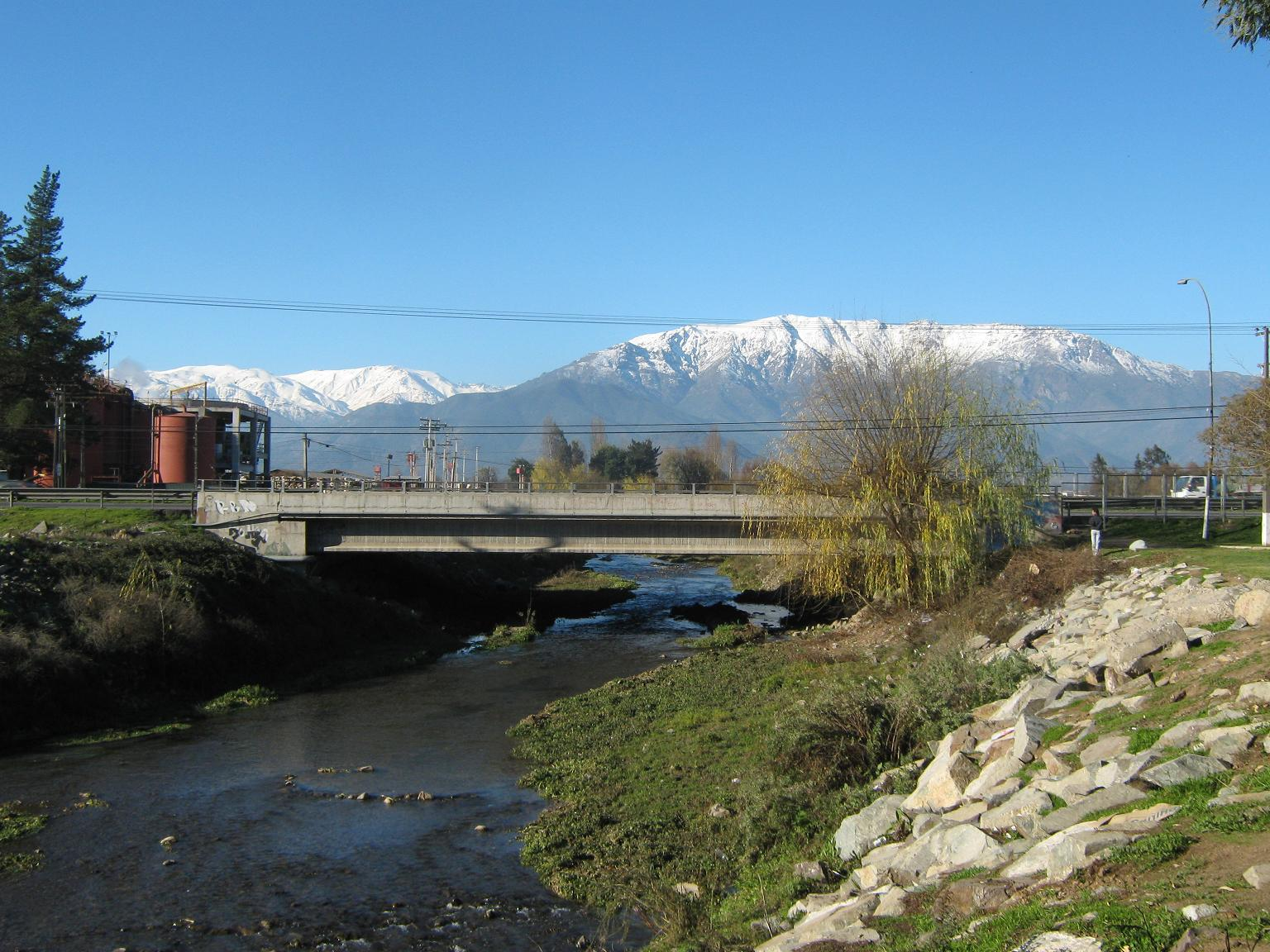
- Tronco creek and CPP biomase plant

- Map of Mostazal commune in O'Higgins Region Location in Chile
- Coordinates: 33°59′S 70°41′W
- Country: Chile
- Region: O'Higgins Region
- Province: Cachapoal Province

Government
  - Type: Municipality
  - Alcalde: Sergio Medel Acosta

Area
  - Total: 523.9 km^{2} (202.3 sq mi)
- Elevation: 486 m (1,594 ft)

Population (2012 Census)
  - Total: 23,430
  - Density: 44.72/km^{2} (115.8/sq mi)
  - Urban: 17,903
  - Rural: 3,963

Sex
  - Men: 11,038
  - Women: 10,828
- Area code: (+56) 72
- Website: Municipality of Mostazal

Mostazal (Spanish pronunciation: [mostaˈsal]) is a Chilean commune in Cachapoal Province, O'Higgins Region. The capital of the commune is the city of San Francisco de Mostazal.

== Geography ==
The commune spans an area of 523.9 km^{2} (202 sq mi). The Plaza de San Francisco has an elevation of 500 m (1,640 ft).

== Demographics ==
According to the 2002 census of the National Statistics Institute, Mostazal has 21,866 inhabitants (11,038 men and 10,828 women). Of these, 17,903 (81.9%) lived in urban areas and 3,963 (18.1%) in rural areas. The population grew by 20.6% (3,728 persons) between the 1992 and 2002 censuses.

== Administration ==
As a commune, Mostazal is a third-level administrative division of Chile administered by a municipal council, headed by an alcalde who is directly elected every four years. The 2008-2012 alcalde is Sergio Medel Acosta. The council has the following members:

- Santiago Garate

Within the electoral divisions of Chile, Mostazal is represented in the Chamber of Deputies by Eugenio Bauer (UDI) and Ricardo Rincón (PDC) as part of the 33rd electoral district, together with Graneros, Codegua, Machalí, Requínoa, Rengo, Olivar, Doñihue, Coinco, Coltauco, Quinta de Tilcoco and Malloa. The commune is represented in the Senate by Andrés Chadwick Piñera (UDI) and Juan Pablo Letelier Morel (PS) as part of the 9th senatorial constituency (O'Higgins Region).

== See also ==
- Sun Monticello
