= Patricio Pérez (Chilean footballer) =

Chilean footballer (born 1980)

Patricio Alejandro Pérez Díaz (born March 14, 1980, in Rengo, Chile) is a Chilean footballer currently playing for Cobresal of the Primera División in Chile.

== Teams ==
- (Chile) San Luis Quillota 2005–2006
- (Chile) Everton 2007
- (Chile) Unión San Felipe 2007–2009
- (Chile) Cobreloa 2010
- (Chile) San Luis Quillota 2010
- (Chile) Rangers 2011
- (Chile) Cobresal 2011
- (Chile) Coquimbo Unido 2012
- (Chile) San Luis 2013–2014

== Titles ==
- Unión San Felipe 2009 (Primera B Championship and Copa Chile)
