= Doñihue =

- City and Commune
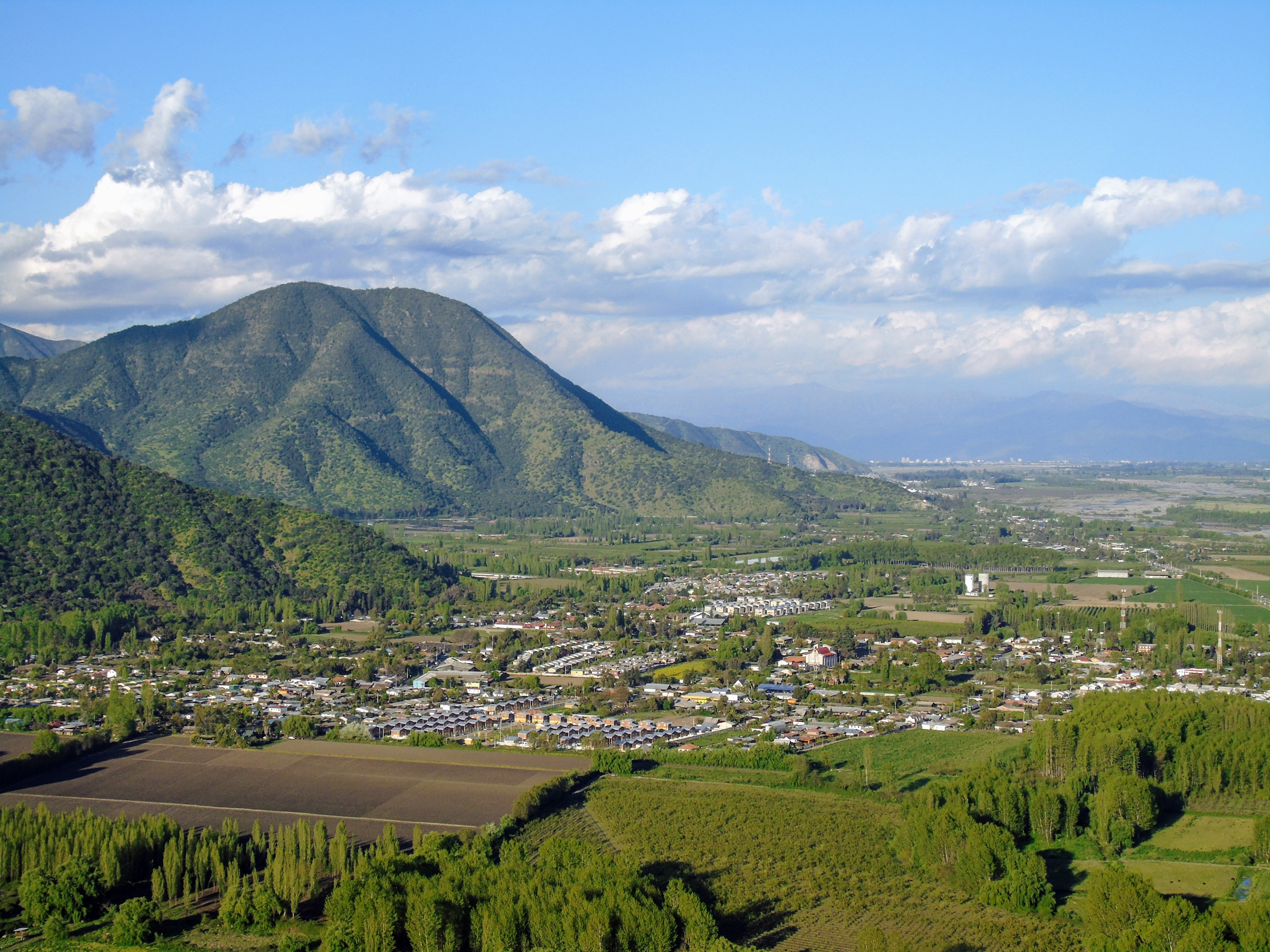

- Commune of Doñihue in the O'Higgins Region Location in Chile
- Coordinates (city): 34°13′34″S 70°57′54″W
- Country: Chile
- Region: O'Higgins Region
- Province: Cachapoal Province

Government
  - Type: Municipality

Area
  - Total: 78.2 km^{2} (30.2 sq mi)
- Elevation: 337 m (1,106 ft)

Population (2012 Census)
  - Total: 18,764
  - Density: 240/km^{2} (621/sq mi)
  - Urban: 15,590
  - Rural: 1,326

Sex
  - Men: 8,475
  - Women: 8,441
- Area code: (+56) 72
- Website: www.donihue.cl

Doñihue (Spanish pronunciation: [doˈɲiwe]) is a Chilean city and commune in Cachapoal Province, O'Higgins Region. It is approximately 20 kilometers (12 miles) west-southwest of Rancagua on route H-30. The comune has two principal towns, Doñihue and Lo Miranda.

== Demographics ==
According to the 2002 census of the National Statistics Institute, Doñihue spans an area of 78.2 km^{2} (30 sq mi) and has 16,916 inhabitants (8,475 men and 8,441 women). Of these, 15,590 (92.2%) lived in urban areas and 1,326 (7.8%) in rural areas. The population grew by 16% (2,338 persons) between the 1992 and 2002 censuses.

== Administration ==
As a commune, Doñihue is a third-level administrative division of Chile administered by a municipal council, headed by an alcalde who is directly elected every four years. Currently the major is Boris Acuña.

Within the electoral divisions of Chile, Doñihue is represented in the Chamber of Deputies by Eugenio Bauer (UDI) and Ricardo Rincón (PDC) as part of the 33rd electoral district, together with Mostazal, Graneros, Codegua, Machalí, Requínoa, Rengo, Olivar, Coinco, Coltauco, Quinta de Tilcoco and Malloa. The commune is represented in the Senate by Andrés Chadwick Piñera (UDI) and Juan Pablo Letelier Morel (PS) as part of the 9th senatorial constituency (O'Higgins Region).
