= O'Higgins Region =

Region of Chile

Libertador General Bernardo O'Higgins Region Región del Libertador General Bernardo O'Higgins
- Region of Chile
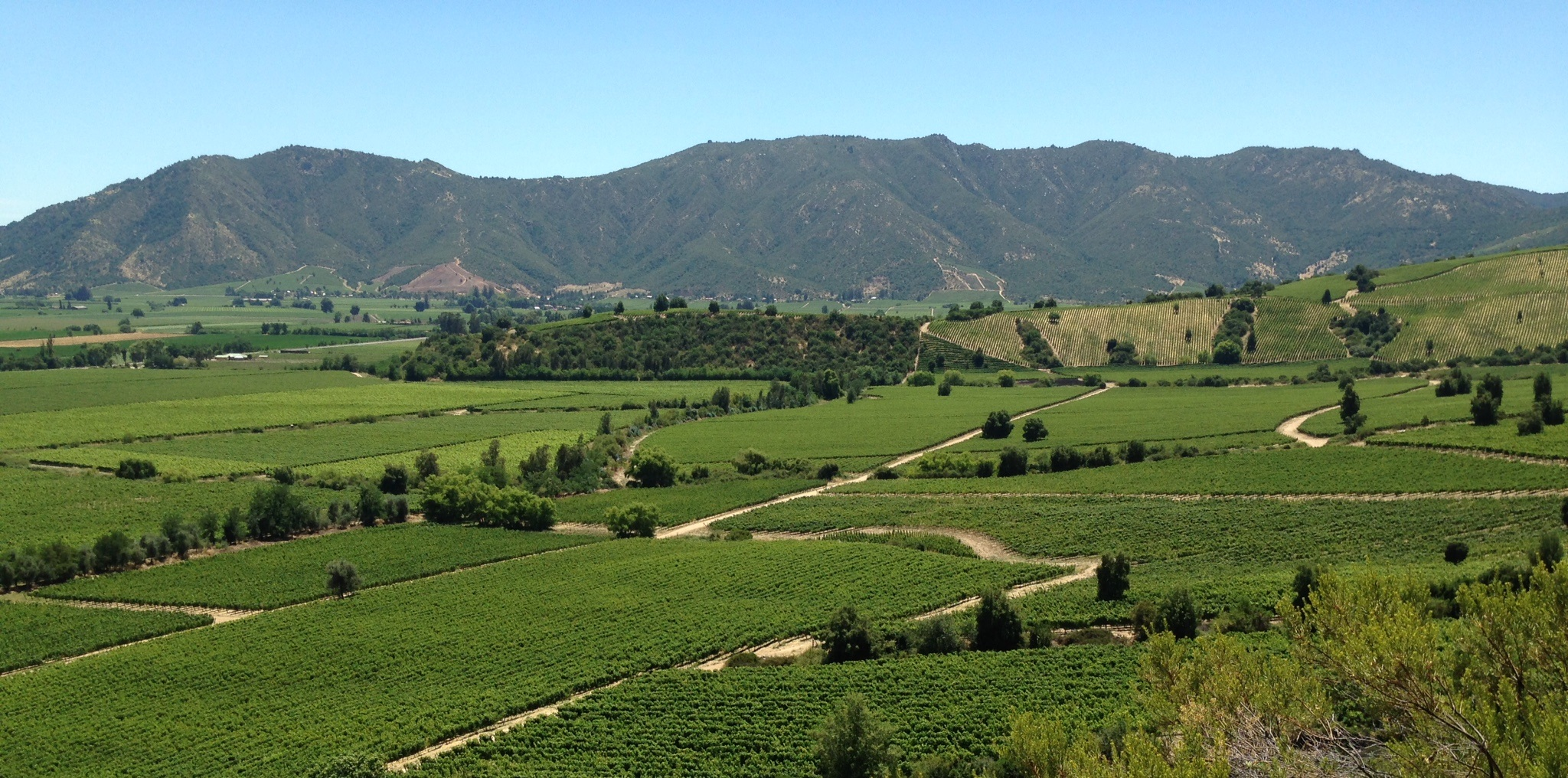
- Viña Montes, Santa Cruz.

- Flag Seal Coat of arms

- Map of Libertador General; Bernardo O'Higgins Region
- Coordinates: 34°10′11″S 70°44′28″W
- Country: Chile
- Capital: Rancagua
- Provinces: Cachapoal, Colchagua, Cardenal Caro

Government
  - Presidential envoy: Susana Pinto (UDI)
  - Governor: Pablo Silva Amaya (PS)

Area
  - Total: 16,387.0 km^{2} (6,327.1 sq mi)
  - Rank: 14
- Lowest elevation: 0 m (0 ft)

Population (2024 census)
  - Total: 987,228
  - Rank: 6
  - Density: 60.2446/km^{2} (156.033/sq mi)

GDP (PPP)
  - Total: $16.376 billion (2014)
  - Per capita: $17,985 (2014)
- ISO 3166 code: CL-LI
- HDI (2022): 0.829 very high
- Website: goreohiggins.cl (in Spanish)

The Libertador General Bernardo O'Higgins Region (Spanish: Región del Libertador General Bernardo O'Higgins, pronounced [liβeɾtaˈðoɾ xeneˈɾal βeɾˈnaɾðo oˈçiɣins]), often shortened to O'Higgins Region (Spanish: Región de O'Higgins), is one of Chile's 16 first order administrative divisions. It is subdivided into three provinces. It is named in honour of Bernardo O'Higgins Riquelme, one of Chile's founding fathers.

The Libertador General Bernardo O'Higgins Region is bordered to the west by the Pacific Ocean, to the east by the Republic of Argentina, to the north by the Valparaíso and Santiago Metropolitan Regions, and to the south by the Maule Region. It extends approximately between the parallels of 33° 51' and 35° 01' south latitude, and between the meridian of 70° 02' west longitude and the Pacific Ocean.

The capital and largest city of the region is Rancagua. The second major town is San Fernando.

== Geography ==
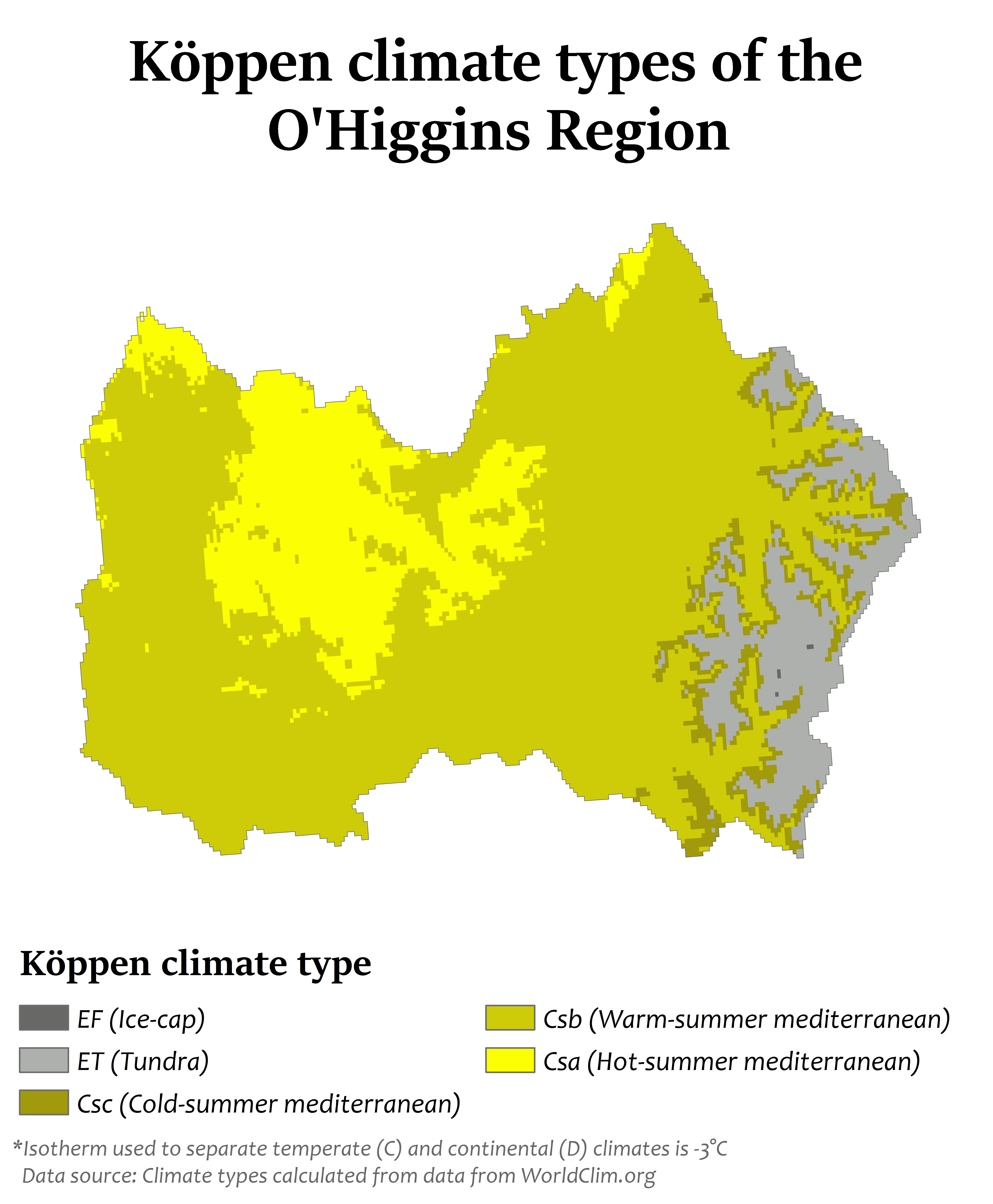
Köppen climate types in the O'Higgins Region.

In pre-Quaternary times extensive Nothofagus forests covered much of Libertador General Bernardo O'Higgins Region.

The Libertador General Bernardo O'Higgins Region is part of the very restricted range of the endangered Chilean Wine Palm, Jubaea chilensis; in prehistoric times this Chilean endemic tree had a significantly larger range.

In the high Andes of O'Higgins Region lie the copper mine of El Teniente and 25 km southeast of this the copper mine prospect of Catedral which lies in an area of glaciers and rock glaciers.

== History ==
From 9000 BCE to 300 BCE (the Archaic Period), the humans who inhabited the region moved between the coast and the valley as well as the Andes. At sites such as Pichilemu, Cáhuil and Bucalemu, they left trash deposits or shell middens bearing testimony to their raids. During the Agroalfarero Period (300 BCE – 1470 CE), the inhabitants experienced changes in their way of life, the most important being the cultivation of vegetables and the manufacture of clay objects. From 600 CE onwards, they started cultivating beans, maize, squashes, pumpkins and quinoa. All of these except quinoa and some types of maize required irrigation, which prompted them to move to the banks of creeks and rivers. During this period, groups of people lived in Quincha houses with straw roofs, in the vicinity of irrigation channels and horticulture crops, a style of life attributable to the Promaucaes or Picunches and to the Chiquillanes. During the Colonial Period (1541 CE to 1811 CE), the region became dominated, like the rest of the country, by the Spanish, and a system of ranching became predominant.

== Demography ==
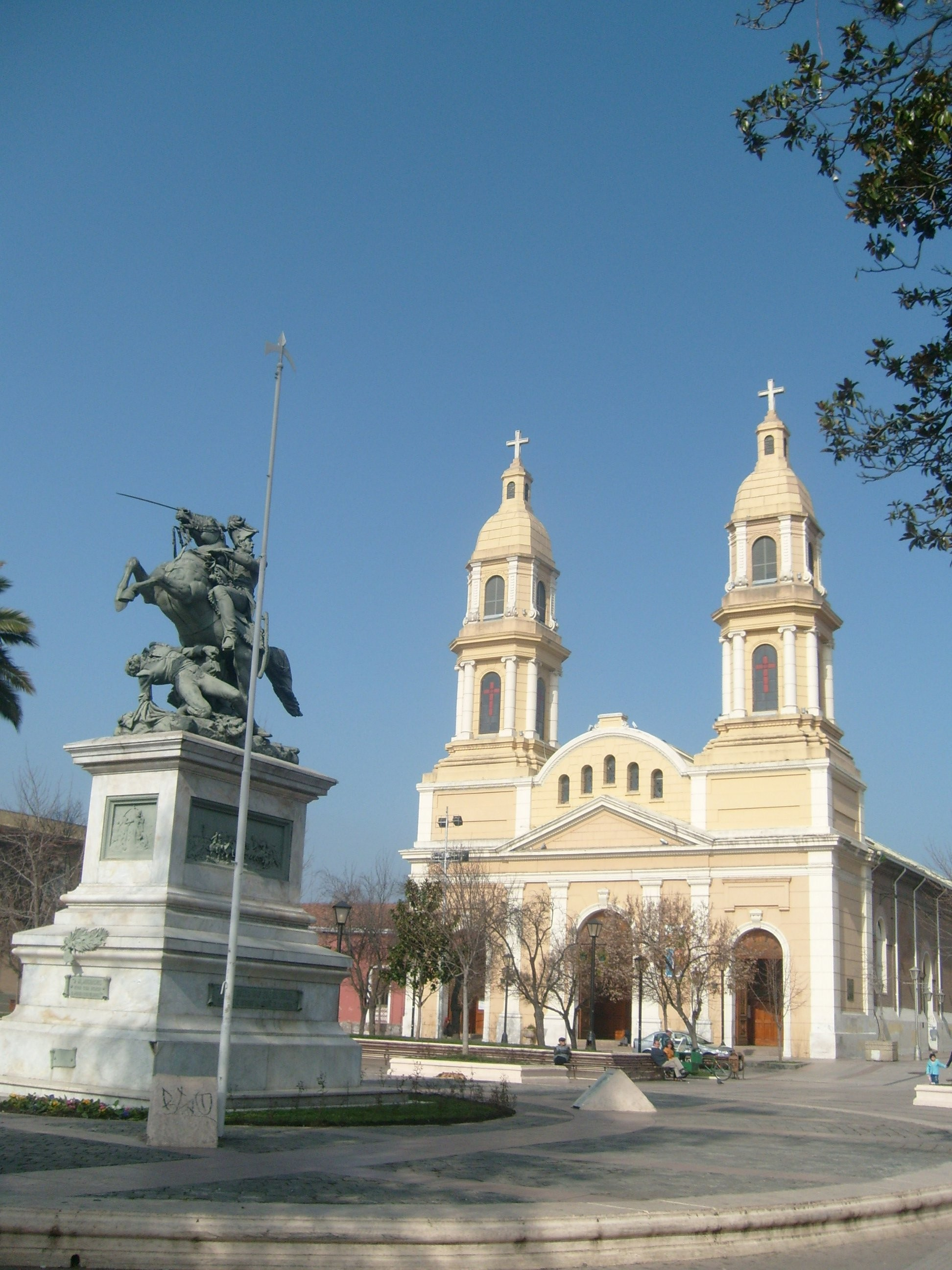
Cathedral at Plaza de los Heroes

The Libertador General Bernardo O'Higgins region contains a large part of the rural population (surpassed only by the Maule Region). Amongst the highly populated cities, Rancagua (257,774 inhabitants) stands out for having been transformed, in recent times, into an outskirt of Santiago. It is close being located 87 km south of Santiago. It is the capital of the Cachapoal Province as well the Libertador General Bernardo O'Higgins Region. According to the census of 2024, other densely populated cities are: San Fernando (75,585 inhabitants); Rengo (63,620); Machalí (60,875); San Vicente de Tagua Tagua (49,559); Santa Cruz (41,209); Chimbarongo (37,258); Graneros (35,938); Requinoa (29,508); and Las Cabras (27,554).

== Economy ==
The main industrial and export activity takes place at CODELCO's El Teniente mine, which contributes 7.7% of Chile's copper production. The ore is processed at the Sewell and Colón concentrator plants, smelted and refined at Caletones, and shipped from the port of San Antonio, in the Valparaíso Region. Byproducts include molybdenum and silver.

Agriculture contributes 30.1% of the region's GDP. One out of every four hectares of fruit orchards in Chile is in the Libertador General Bernardo O'Higgins Region. The main crops are apples and pears, followed by table grapes, plums, kiwis, and nectarines.

Manufacturing activity in the region is mostly related to copper mining, agribusiness, and food and beverages. One particular growth area is the production of fruit juices and pulp, and dehydrated fruit.

Over the past few years, there has been significant development in the forestry sector, especially plantations of eucalyptus and radiata pine.

== Law and government ==
The region is co-governed by a presidential regional delegate, who is appointed by the president —currently independent Susana Pinto— and popularly-elected governor of O'Higgins, Pablo Silva Amaya, who was elected in 2021 and reelected in 2024 and will serve until 2029.

The administration of the region rests with the regional government which is headed by the regional governor and the regional council (Consejo Regional de Chile). The latter comprises twenty regional council members, who are popularly elected since 2013 (thirteen from Cachapoal, five from Colchagua, and two from Cardenal Caro).

=== Administrative divisions ===
For purposes of interior administration, the Libertador General Bernardo O'Higgins Region is divided into three provinces:

- Cachapoal Province, capital: Rancagua,
- Colchagua Province, capital: San Fernando,
- Cardenal Caro Province, capital: Pichilemu.

The provinces are subdivided into 33 communes.

Politico-administrative divisions of the Libertador General Bernardo O'Higgins Region

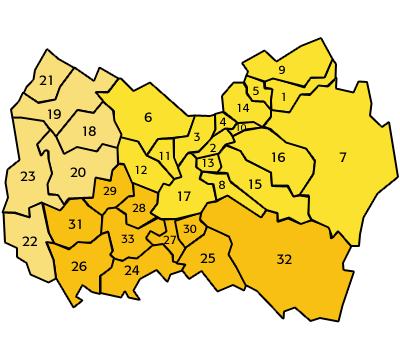

Province	Capital	Commune
Cachapoal	Rancagua	1 Codegua
Cachapoal	Rancagua	2 Coínco
Cachapoal	Rancagua	3 Coltauco
Cachapoal	Rancagua	4 Doñihue
Cachapoal	Rancagua	5 Graneros
Cachapoal	Rancagua	6 Las Cabras
Cachapoal	Rancagua	7 Machalí
Cachapoal	Rancagua	8 Malloa
Cachapoal	Rancagua	9 Mostazal
Cachapoal	Rancagua	10 Olivar
Cachapoal	Rancagua	11 Peumo
Cachapoal	Rancagua	12 Pichidegua
Cachapoal	Rancagua	13 Quinta de Tilcoco
Cachapoal	Rancagua	14 Rancagua
Cachapoal	Rancagua	15 Rengo
Cachapoal	Rancagua	16 Requínoa
Cachapoal	Rancagua	17 San Vicente de Tagua Tagua

Province	Capital	Commune
Cardenal Caro	Pichilemu	18 La Estrella
Cardenal Caro	Pichilemu	19 Litueche
Cardenal Caro	Pichilemu	20 Marchihue
Cardenal Caro	Pichilemu	21 Navidad
Cardenal Caro	Pichilemu	22 Paredones
Cardenal Caro	Pichilemu	23 Pichilemu
Colchagua	San Fernando	24 Chépica
Colchagua	San Fernando	25 Chimbarongo
Colchagua	San Fernando	26 Lolol
Colchagua	San Fernando	27 Nancagua
Colchagua	San Fernando	28 Palmilla
Colchagua	San Fernando	29 Peralillo
Colchagua	San Fernando	30 Placilla
Colchagua	San Fernando	31 Pumanque
Colchagua	San Fernando	32 San Fernando
Colchagua	San Fernando	33 Santa Cruz

== Culture ==
This area is known as the "huaso province" after the name of the Chilean cowboy, the huaso. Sashes and mantas – traditional items of the huaso costume – are woven in Doñihue on heavy vertical looms. Designs imitate vine leaves, bunches of grapes, pines and copihues. Other designs of colored stripes are woven on horizontal looms.

The population is a mixture of both European (including Argentine immigrants) and indigenous races and cultures, thus the region has a homogeneous culture known as Chileanidad is present and a mestizo imprint is evident.

The Libertador General Bernardo O'Higgins Region was settled by Spaniards (notably Andalusians, Basques, Aragonese and Navarrese) and other Europeans. French and Italian families established agriculture including the important wine industry: the Wine Route is one of the main tourist attractions of the Colchagua valley. Breweries can be found as well, the legacy of German and Swiss immigration. Livestock herding was especially influenced by British, Greek and Yugoslavian settlers.

=== Regional festivals ===
Anniversaries
Date	English name	Spanish name	Notes
1–2 October	Disaster of Rancagua	Desastre de Rancagua	In memory of the Battle of Rancagua which occurred in 1814

== Notable people ==
- Violeta Zúñiga (1933–2019), human rights activist
- Stephanie Vaquer (born 1993), professional wrestler signed with WWE
