= Andrés Chadwick =

Chilean politician (born 1956)

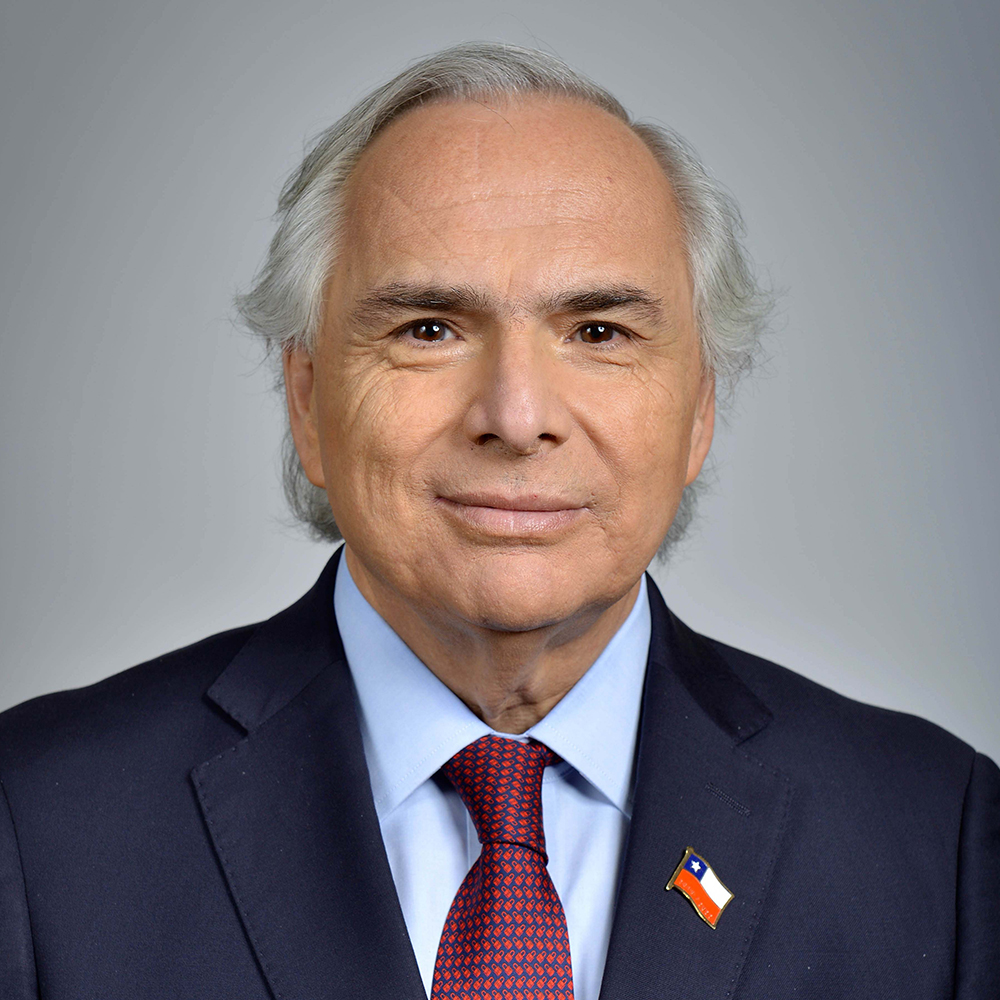

Interior and Public Security Minister
- In office 11 March 2018 – 28 October 2019
- President: Sebastián Piñera
- Preceded by: Mario Fernández Baeza
- Succeeded by: Gonzalo Blumel
- In office 5 November 2012 – 11 March 2014
- President: Sebastián Piñera
- Preceded by: Rodrigo Hinzpeter
- Succeeded by: Rodrigo Peñailillo

Ministry General Secretariat of Government
- In office 18 July 2011 – 5 September 2012
- President: Sebastián Piñera
- Preceded by: Ena von Baer
- Succeeded by: Cecilia Pérez

Member of the Senate of Chile
- In office 11 March 1998 – 18 July 2011
- Preceded by: Anselmo Sule
- Succeeded by: Alejandro García-Huidobro
- Constituency: 9th Circumscription

Member of the Chamber of Deputies
- In office 11 March 1990 – 11 March 1998
- Preceded by: District created
- Succeeded by: Ricardo Rincón
- Constituency: 33rd District

Personal details
- Born: 2 January 1956 (age 70) Santiago, Chile
- Party: Popular Unitary Action Movement (MAPU) (1970–1973); National Renewal (1987–1990); Independent Democratic Union (UDI) (1983–1987) (1990–)
- Other political affiliations: Frente Juvenil de Unidad Nacional
- Spouse: María Victoria Costa Vega
- Children: Four
- Relatives: Tomás Chadwick (uncle); Sebastián Pinera (cousin)
- Education: Pontifical Catholic University of Chile (LL.B)
- Occupation: Politician
- Profession: Lawyer

Andrés Pío Bernardino Chadwick Piñera (born 2 January 1956) is a Chilean right-wing politician and lawyer, member of the Independent Democrat Union (UDI) party. He began his political career as a supporter of the Pinochet regime, and was present at the Acto de Chacarillas in 1977.

Chadwick was elected deputy for the 33rd District in 1989, and was re-elected in 1993. In 1997, he was elected senator for the 9th Circumscription of the VI Región del Libertador General Bernardo O'Higgins, and was re-elected in 2005 again.

On 18 July 2011, he was invited by his cousin, President Sebastián Piñera, to become Minister Secretary General of Government. He was later appointed Interior Minister on 5 November 2012 and his term ended on 11 March 2014. He joined the second government of Piñera on 11 March 2018 as Interior and Public Security Minister and held that position until 28 October 2019.

On 11 December, Chadwick was impeached for his role in the 2019–2020 Chilean protests, including the large number of eye injuries attained by protesters. Chadwick is effectively banned from holding public office for five years (until 2024).

== Early life and education ==
Chadwick was born in Santiago on 2 January 1956. He is married to María Victoria Costa Vega and has four children. He is the son of Hernán Chadwick Valdés, a notary and later Registrar of Real Estate of Santiago, and Paulette Piñera Carvallo. He is the nephew of José Piñera Carvallo, former ambassador to Belgium and the United Nations, and of Archbishop Bernardino Piñera, former president of the Chilean Episcopal Conference.

He is the brother of María Teresa Chadwick Piñera, former executive secretary of the National Council for Drug Control (CONACE), and Hernán Chadwick Piñera, former president of the Association of Infrastructure Concessionaires and former vice president of the National Television Council. He is a cousin of former president Sebastián Piñera and former minister José Piñera. He is also the brother-in-law of politician José Antonio Viera-Gallo.

He completed his primary and secondary education at Colegio del Verbo Divino in Santiago and later studied law at the Pontifical Catholic University of Chile, obtaining a degree in Legal and Social Sciences. He qualified as a lawyer on 21 April 1980. During his university years, he served as a teaching assistant in law.

== Academic and professional career ==
Chadwick taught law at the Pontifical Catholic University of Chile and at Finis Terrae University. He also worked as a columnist for Las Últimas Noticias and La Tercera, and as a political commentator on Radio Portales and Radio Nuevo Mundo.

He later became an academic at San Sebastián University, where he served as dean of the Faculty of Law and Social Sciences from April 2022 until June 2024, and as president of the university’s board of trustees until September 2024.

== Political career ==
Chadwick began his political activity in 1977 as president of the gremialist movement at the Pontifical Catholic University of Chile. In 1979, he was elected president of the Federation of Students of the Pontifical Catholic University of Chile (FEUC), and in 1981 became president of the National Unity Youth Front.

In 1983, he joined the Independent Democratic Union (UDI), serving as president of its youth wing until 1985 and later joining its Political Commission. In 1987, he joined National Renewal (RN), becoming president of its youth organization until the party split with the UDI in 1988. Between 1988 and 1989, he served as a permanent member of the Third Legislative Commission of the Government Junta and later as legal counsel to the Ministry of National Planning (MIDEPLAN). Between 1994 and 1998, he served as vice president of the UDI.

From 18 July 2011 to 5 November 2012, Chadwick served as Minister Secretary General of Government. On 5 November 2012, he was appointed Minister of the Interior, a position he held until 11 March 2014. He returned to the same office on 11 March 2018 during President Sebastián Piñera’s second administration, serving until 28 October 2019.

On 11 December 2019, the Senate of Chile approved a constitutional impeachment against Chadwick, disqualifying him from holding public office for five years.

In September 2024, Chadwick resigned from the Independent Democratic Union following public criticism related to his alleged involvement in the Audios case.
