= Graneros =

- City and Commune
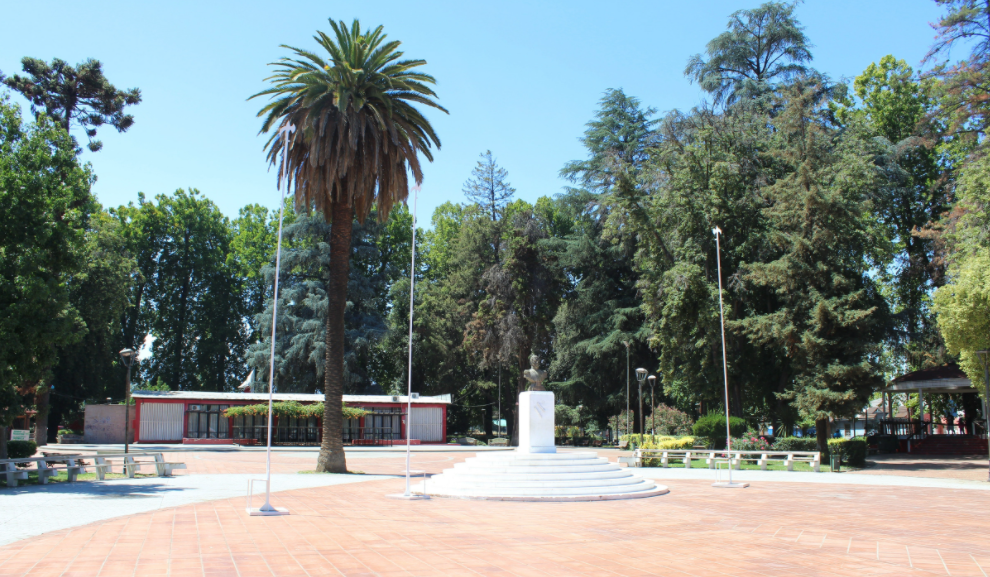
- The Plaza de Armas is the main square in Graneros.

- Location of the Graneros commune in O'Higgins Region Location in Chile
- Coordinates (city): 34°03′53″S 70°43′35″W
- Country: Chile
- Region: O'Higgins Region
- Province: Cachapoal Province
- Founded: 1899

Government
  - Type: Municipality
  - Alcalde: Marcelo Miñañir Matus

Area
  - Total: 112.7 km^{2} (43.5 sq mi)
- Elevation: 113 m (371 ft)

Population (2024 Census)
  - Total: 35,938
  - Density: 318.9/km^{2} (825.9/sq mi)
- Demonym: Granerino
- Area code: (+56) 72
- Website: Official website (in Spanish)

Graneros is a commune and city in central Chile, located in the O’Higgins Region, Cachapoal Province. It covers an area of 113 km^{2} and has a population of 35,938 inhabitants (2024 Census), including 17,613 men and 18,325 women. It is situated 74.36 km from Santiago and 11.97 km from Rancagua. Together with the communes of Mostazal and Codegua, Graneros forms part of the Northern Cone area of the O’Higgins Region, serving as its main urban center and a hub for agro-industrial, commercial, and service development.

== History ==
=== Pre-hispanic period ===
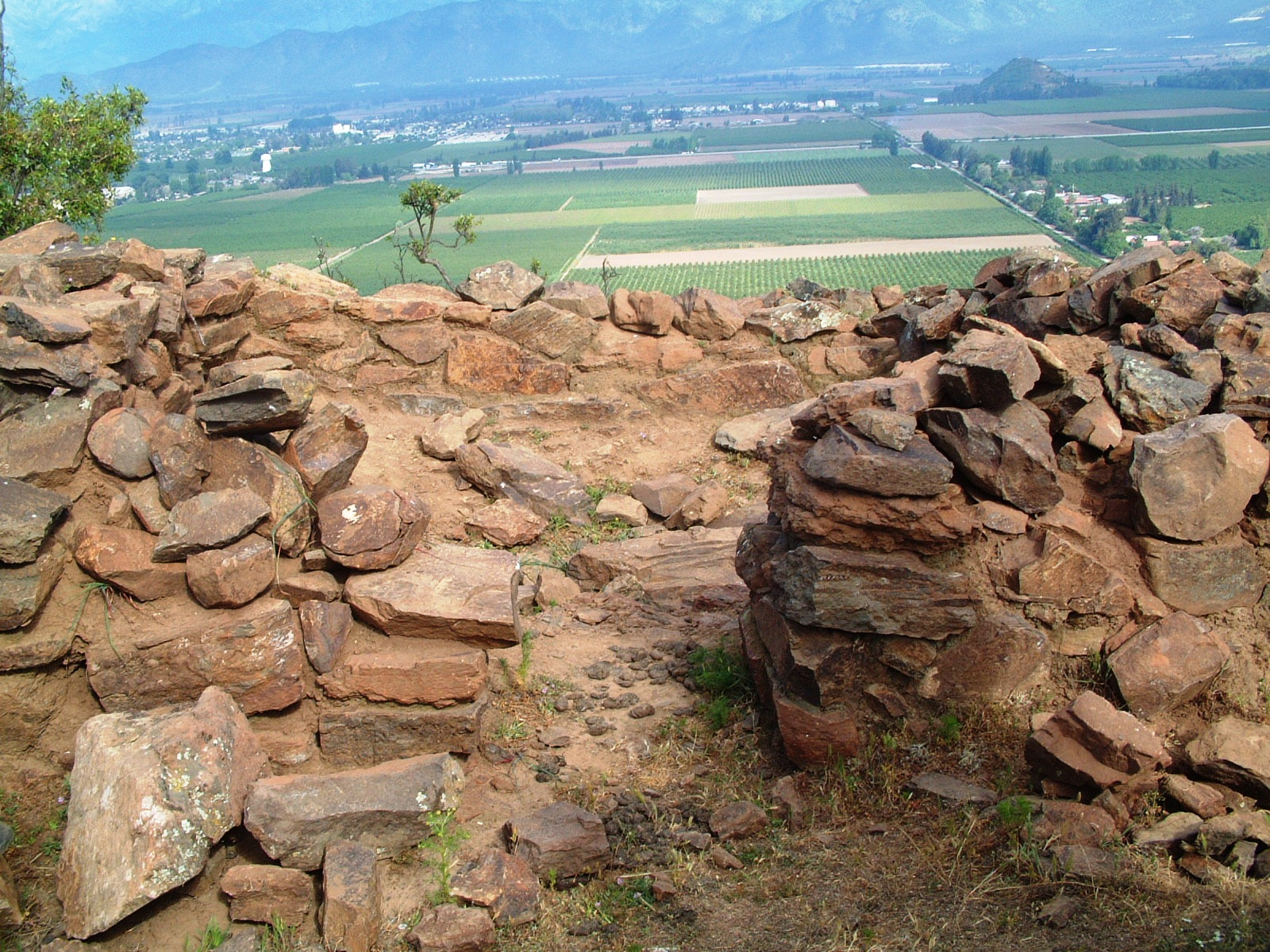
Remains of the Pucará de La Compañía.

The territory where the commune of Graneros is currently located shows verifiable evidence of early occupation by Indigenous peoples (10th millennium BCE). The Indigenous groups of the Cachapoal Valley were mainly the Picunches, who before the arrival of the Spanish were associated with the lonco Cachapoal and called themselves Cachapoales. Their main settlements were around what is now the city of Rancagua, along the river and valley of the same name, consisting of family-based groups that freely moved across their territory. At that time, the area of Graneros served as a passage northward through the Angostura Pass, north of Mostazal. The Cerro de La Compañía (La Compañía Hill) was a strategic point for controlling this route, and there was communication among the villages governed by the caciques of each sector. There is also evidence of early occupation (8th millennium BCE) by another originally nomadic, hunter-gatherer people known as the Chiquillanes, who seasonally crossed the Andes, reaching the valley and occasionally the coast. At the time of the Spanish conquest, these groups remained mostly on the Argentine side of the mountains.

Before the conquest, the Picunches of each aillarehue surrendered peacefully to the Incas, since they had historically shown little resistance to external domination—unlike their southern Mapuche relatives, who had a more warrior-like culture. After the fall of the Inca Empire, several years passed before the Spanish arrived in these lands. When they did, they found cultivated maize fields and herds of llamas. There is also information about early copper mining in the interior areas of Codegua. The Spanish settlers first occupied what is now Rancagua, rebuilding the existing village.

There is archaeological evidence of Inca presence in the area, associated with the Pucará de La Compañía, which likely served commercial and administrative purposes for the empire’s southern frontier.

=== Colonial period and Chilean independence ===
One of the first encomenderos of the northern cone of the region, mentioned in the Libro Becerro, was Don Gonzalo de los Ríos y Ávila, one of the soldiers who arrived with Pedro de Valdivia. For his services in the conquest, he was granted an estate in the Codegua Valley, another in La Ligua, and the administration of the gold washings of Marga-Marga. His son, Gonzalo de los Ríos y Encio, later inherited these lands. After his death, the property passed to other settlers and clergy through encomiendas or land grants, including Alonso de Toledo and his brother Luis de Toledo, owners of the “Punta de las Cabras” and “Queyemavida” estates—now part of the area known as Cerro Pan de Azúcar.

In 1615, the Society of Jesus (Jesuits) acquired both properties—one by cession and another by purchase—gradually expanding their holdings. In 1663, after a military expedition visited the Andean foothills above Rancagua, the Jesuits bought the Barahona family’s estate, which included the Codegua ravine and the mountainous lands between the Codegua and Coya rivers. By 1672, they had also purchased an abandoned Dominican estate near Machalí, reaching what is now Villa La Compañía. Over the next decades, boundary disputes arose with the Córdoba family, major landowners in the area. The Real Audiencia ultimately confirmed the Jesuits’ property rights in 1668.

In 1767, the Jesuits were expelled from all Spanish territories. Their hacienda passed to the Crown and was later auctioned to Count Mateo de Toro y Zambrano in 1771. The estate continued agricultural production as before, supplying much of the Chilean territory. After Toro y Zambrano’s death, his widow, Countess Josefa Dumont de Holdre, managed the estate amid Chile’s War of Independence. Despite her royalist sympathies, her daughter Nicolasa de Toro-Zambrano married the patriot Juan de Dios Correa de Saa y Martínez, ensuring the family retained the estate. Nicolasa played an active role in its management and successfully lobbied for the new southern railway line to include a station at the crossing of the two royal roads. Around this station, a settlement grew, which would become the modern city of Graneros.

=== 19th century ===
In 1859, the Santiago–Rancagua railway section was inaugurated. A provisional stop was authorized at Hijuela Los Graneros, and the definitive railway station, named “Graneros,” opened on July 14, 1860, giving the town its name.

After the War of the Pacific (1883), Chile reorganized its administrative divisions, creating the province of O’Higgins on December 10, 1883. On November 7, 1885, Graneros was officially designated a villa (town). With the approval of the 1891 Law on Municipal Organization and Autonomous Communes, President Jorge Montt established the Municipality of Graneros on December 24, 1891. Its territory included the 7th subdelegation of La Compañía and the 8th of Codegua, within the Department of Rancagua. Although Codegua then had a larger population, political influence led to Graneros being chosen as the municipal seat.

In 1893, Juan Rafael Ovalle subdivided four blocks of land he had purchased from his mother, creating five urban lots for sale. That same year, his mother Adelaida Correa Toro sold the Los Torunos estate to Gregorio Donoso, after gifting parcels to her tenants. On November 17, 1899, the act of the municipality’s foundation was read in Plaza Ovalle, attended by local authorities and residents.

=== 20th century ===
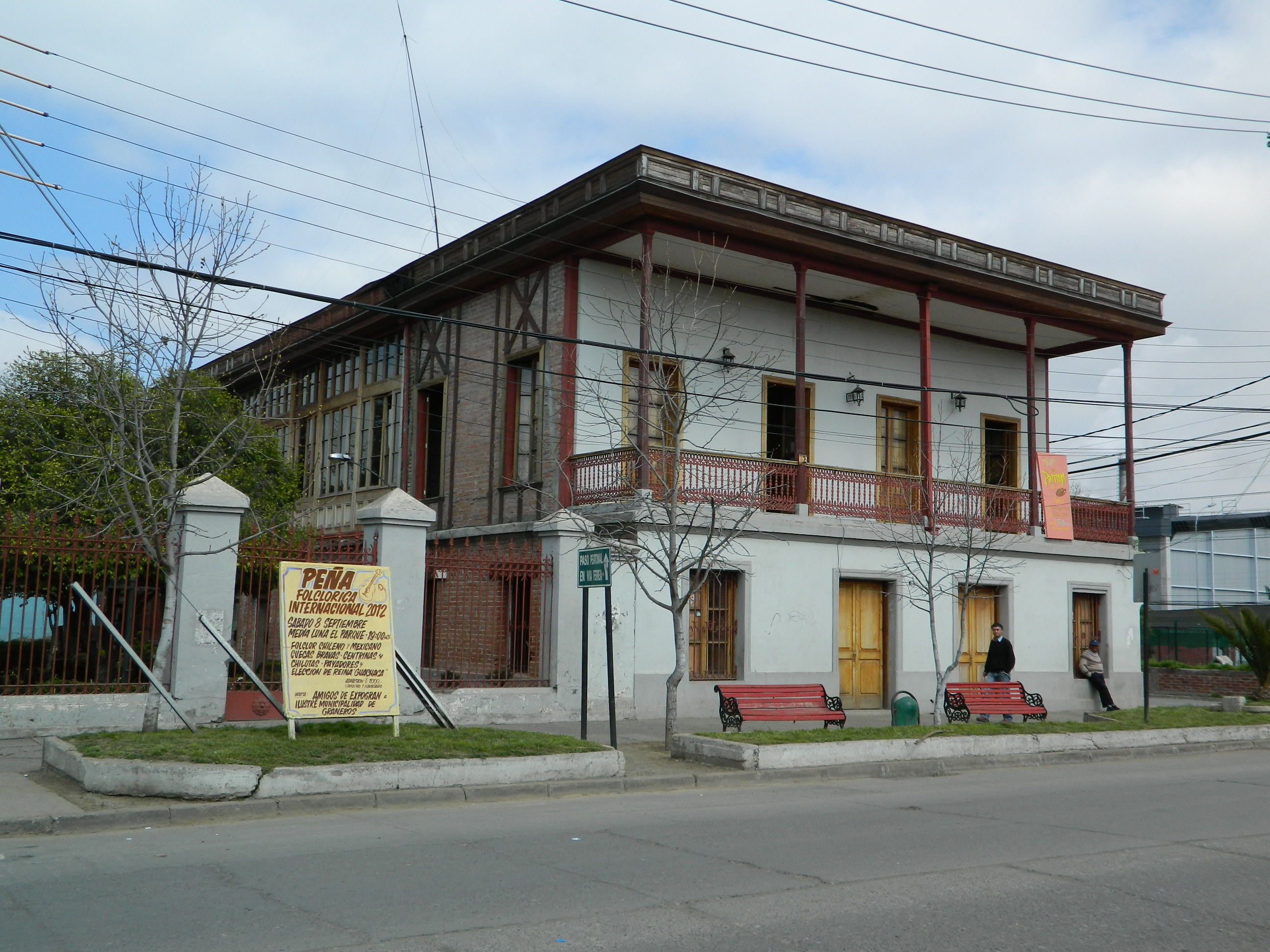
Hodgkinson House

A major milestone occurred in 1901 when engineer Gilbert B. R. Hodgkinson and Juan Rafael Ovalle built the first automobile in Chile at the Casa Hodgkinson—a historic house still standing at the intersection of Avenida La Compañía and Avenida O’Higgins. This marked the beginning of local industry. Hodgkinson, of English origin, and Ovalle later founded the Maestranza Ovalle-Hodgkinson, a workshop that produced railroad parts and, later, narrow-gauge locomotives for the El Teniente copper mine.

The establishment of El Teniente Mine effectively began in Graneros, which—thanks to its railway connection and proximity to the mine—became the operational center of the Braden Copper Company. Industrialization expanded during Chile’s Presidential Republic period (1925–1973). In 1936, the Weir Scott & Co. condensed milk factory became part of Nestlé, later renamed SONALEGRA (National Dairy Society of Graneros) and then CHIPRODAL (Chilean Food Production Company), diversifying into products like Nescafé, Milo, and infant cereals.

In the mid-20th century, amid Latin America’s Developmentalism and Import Substitution Industrialization (ISI) policies, CORFO (Production Development Corporation) promoted an industrial plant in the area to attract foreign capital. This led to the establishment of CORFIAT Rancagua, the Chilean subsidiary of Fiat, boosting local industry and housing development (including Villa Fiat).

Following the 1973 military coup, the Graneros plant was intervened, and workers faced layoffs and persecution. The factory closed in 1981 amid the 1982 economic crisis, as neoliberal and monetarist reforms aligned with the Washington Consensus ushered in regional deindustrialization and a shift toward an agro-export economy.

== Demographics ==
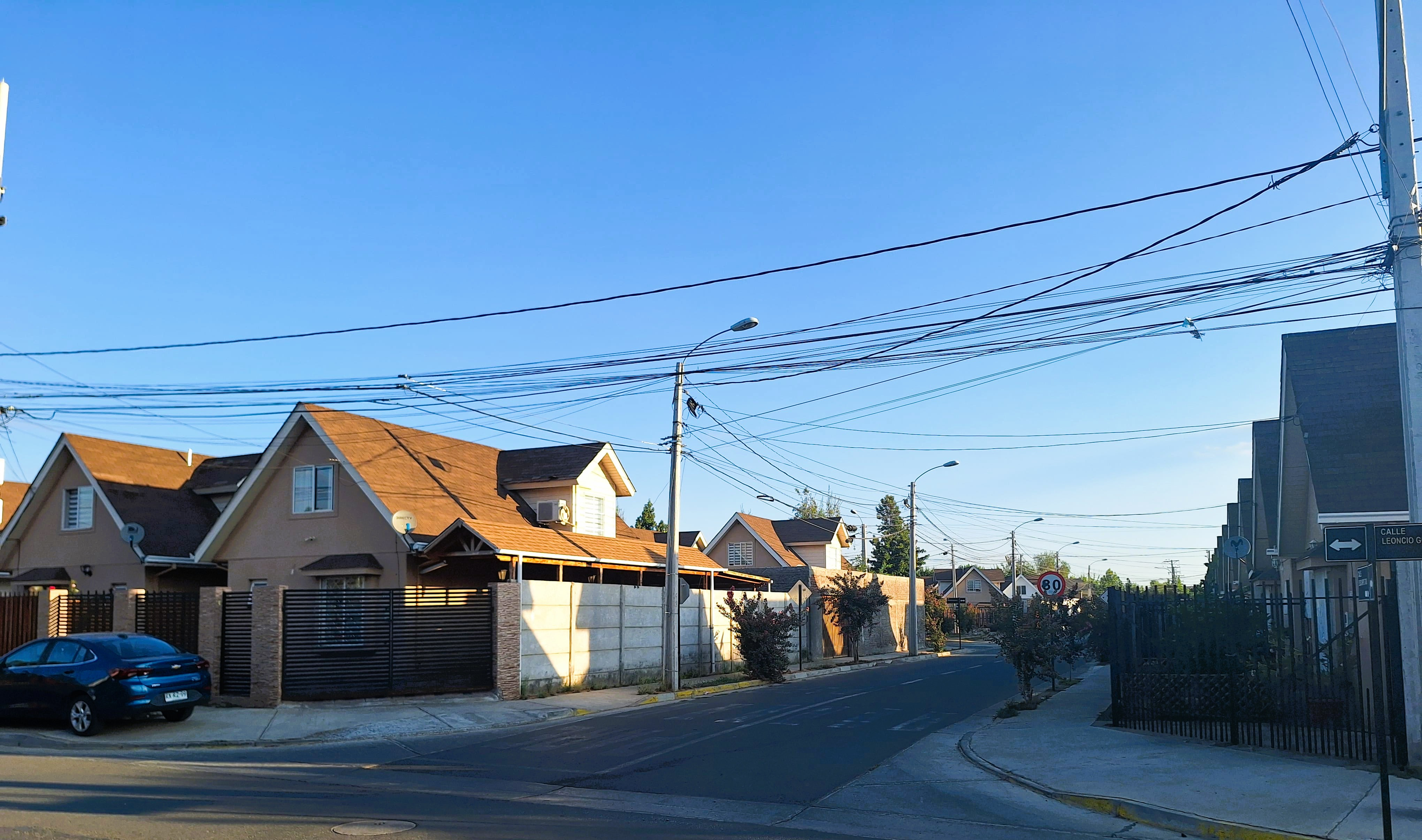
Villa Los Torunos, in the eastern sector of Graneros.

=== Localities ===
The urban area of the commune of Graneros is divided into the following neighborhood sectors:

- Graneros Centro: Area bounded by Route H-10 (to the west) and the streets Santa María (to the north), Luis Barros Borgoño Norte (to the east), and Av. La Compañía (to the south). This sector contains Graneros’ Main Square, the Nestlé Graneros factory, and main health (Santa Filomena Hospital), commercial (SuperBodega aCuenta), and transportation services (Graneros Station).
- Graneros Norte: Area comprising the neighborhoods Corvi Norte, Villa Hodgkinson, Los Lagos, Los Regidores, El Manzanal, El Roble, El Parque, San Hernán, and Plaza Graneros (SOCOVESA). It corresponds to government housing developments and private real estate projects built from the 1970s to the present.
- Graneros Sur: Area including the neighborhoods Villa Hospital, Chiprodal, Conde de La Conquista, Domingo Yáñez, Las Acacias, Pedro Aguirre Cerda (PAC), Los Líderes, Capricornio, El Bosque, Casas Las Mercedes, and Villa Doña Catalina. It consists of older settlements formed by land occupations regularized during the 1960s and 1970s (Domingo Yáñez and Capricornio), housing developments linked to the industrial modernization process (Chiprodal and Las Acacias), and new residential projects along Route H-10 connecting to the commune of Rancagua, developed after the 2010s (Casas Las Mercedes and Villa Doña Catalina).
- Graneros Poniente: Area made up of the neighborhoods Portal de Santa Julia, Sagrada Familia, Cruz Roja, Los Poetas, Rafael Carvallo, Bicentenario, and Villa Alejandro Goic. It consists of government and self-managed housing projects organized through neighborhood housing committees.
- Graneros Oriente: Area including the neighborhoods El Aromo 1 and 2, Villa Monasterio, Villa Magisterio, Los Castaños, Camino del Alba, Covigra, Los Torunos, Jardines de Graneros, CORVI Sur I and II, Santa Rosa, Nueva Ciudad, San Benito, and Villa Fiat. These correspond to housing developments associated with the commune’s industrial modernization process and to new real estate projects developed after the 1990s.

The rural area of the Graneros commune is composed of the following localities: Cuarta Hijuela, El Arrozal, El Molino, La Ballica, La Compañía, La Anivana, Las Higueras, Los Romeros, Nuevos Campos, Santa Julia, Santa Margarita, and Tuniche.

== Environment ==
=== Geomorphology and abiotic components ===
Simplified layout of ecosystems and water bodies present in the commune of Graneros.

The commune of Graneros is located within the geomorphological units of the Rancagua Basin and the Chilean Coastal Range; and according to the Köppen climate classification, it presents a Mediterranean climate with winter rainfall (Csb) and a high-altitude Mediterranean climate with winter rainfall (Csb (h)). It is also located between the hydrographic basins of the Maipo River and the Rapel River (upper sub-basin of the Cachapoal River). In addition, the commune contains several bodies of water, notably the Codegua Stream, La Cadena Stream, and La Leonera Stream.

=== Biotic components ===
Within the commune’s territory, the following ecosystems can be found:

- Coastal Mediterranean deciduous forest dominated by Nothofagus macrocarpa and Ribes punctatum (Vulnerable)
- Andean Mediterranean sclerophyll forest dominated by Quillaja saponaria and Lithrea caustica (Vulnerable)
- Coastal Mediterranean sclerophyll forest dominated by Cryptocarya alba and Peumus boldus (Vulnerable)
- Inland Mediterranean thorn forest dominated by Acacia caven and Prosopis chilensis (Vulnerable)

=== Environmental protection measures ===
As of 2022, the commune of Graneros includes the following areas with some degree of environmental protection:

- Alhué (Conservation Landscape)
- Cordón de Cantillana (Law 19.300 Sites)
- Northern Coastal Range and Cocalán (Law 19.300 Sites)

== Administration ==
=== Municipality ===
The Illustrious Municipality of Graneros is headed by Mayor Marcelo Miñañir Matus (Independent), who is advised by six councilors:

Carlos Antonio Ávila Parraguez, Independent – Liberal Greens for a Safe Commune (Liberal Party and Social Green Regionalist Federation).

- Teresa Carmen Elgueta Moreno, Independent – Your Radical Commune (Radical Party).
- Valentina Paz Segovia Donoso, Liberal Party.
- Angélica del Carmen Moreno Miranda, National Renewal.
- Natalia Espinoza Valerio, Independent, Chile Vamos (UDI – RN – Evópoli).
- Thae Loiza Galaz, Party for Democracy.

=== Parliamentary representation ===
Graneros belongs to the 15th electoral district and the 8th senatorial constituency (O’Higgins). It is represented in the Chamber of Deputies of the National Congress by deputies Marta González (Ind–PPD), Marcela Riquelme (Ind–FA), Natalia Romero (Ind–UDI), Raúl Soto (PPD), and Diego Schalper (UDI).

It is also represented in the Senate by senators Alejandra Sepúlveda (FRVS), Javier Macaya (UDI), and Juan Luis Castro (PS).

== Economy ==
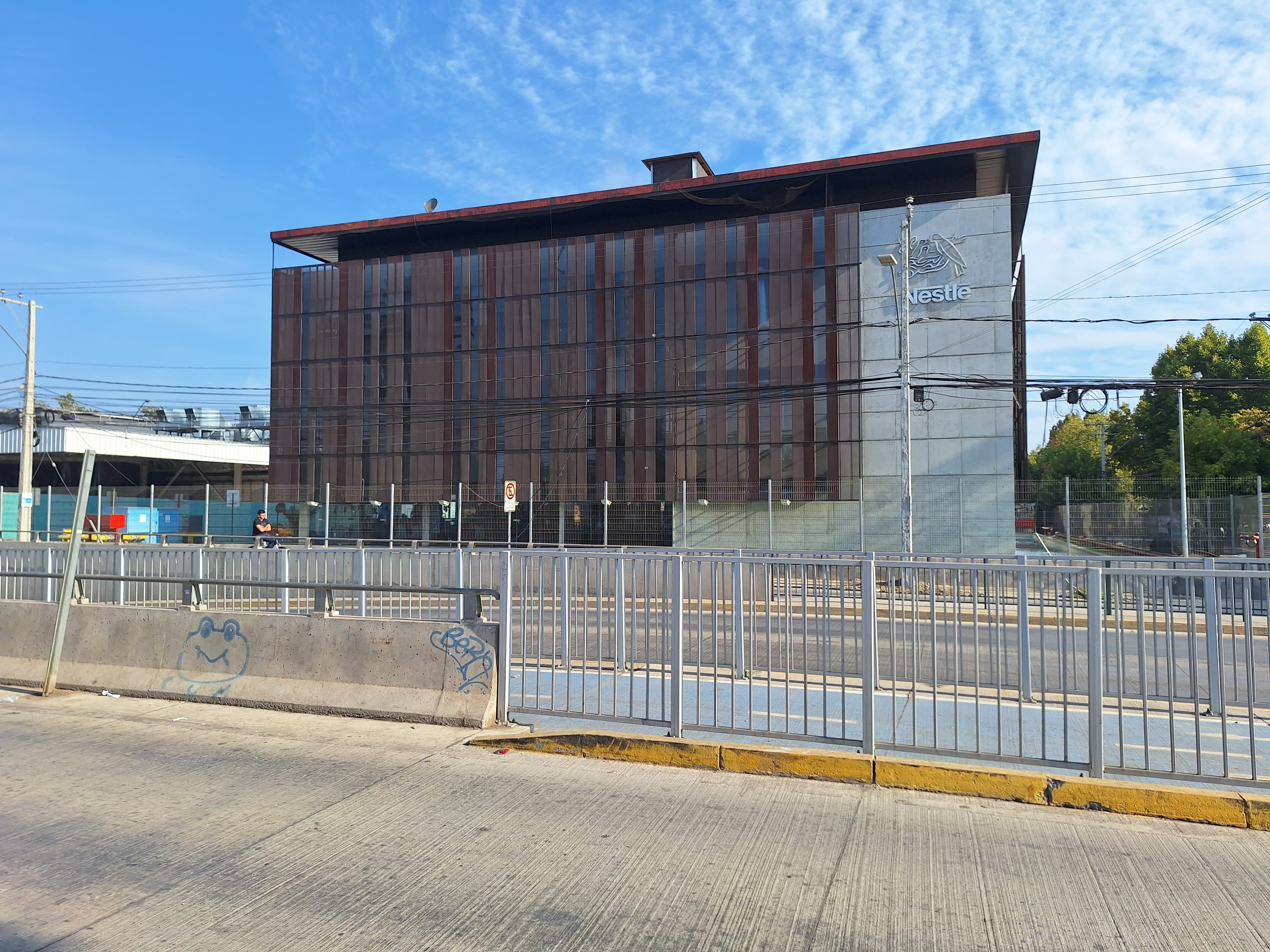
Block Social Building, Nestlé Graneros.

The economic structure of the commune of Graneros is centered on activities derived from and highly dependent on agriculture, integrating value chains with a high degree of internationalization, technical modernization, and both national and foreign direct investment (FDI) in business development and research, development and innovation aimed at biotechnology, food engineering, and solar power. The main economic sectors in the commune of Graneros include:

=== Agribusiness ===
Based on industrial food processing activities for national and regional consumption (Latin America) and the export of stone fruit and other fresh fruits to the international market. The main companies within this sector in Graneros are Nestlé and Tuniche Fruits.

=== Biotechnology ===
Linked to the research and development of plant crops and seeds, as well as the washing, drying, and commercialization of plant seeds for domestic use and export to international markets. The main companies operating in this sector in the commune are Bayer Monsanto (Southern Cone), Syngenta (Crop Research Center), and Semillas Tuniche.

=== Industry ===
Graneros hosts the International Paper industrial packaging processing plant, as well as the INDURA industrial gas production facility.

=== Energy ===
The commune has developed several solar power ventures, including the Los Libertadores Photovoltaic Plant, the Meli Photovoltaic Park, Nan Solar Power Plant, the Alameda Photovoltaic Plant, and the Graneros Photovoltaic Park.

== International relations ==
=== International investment ===
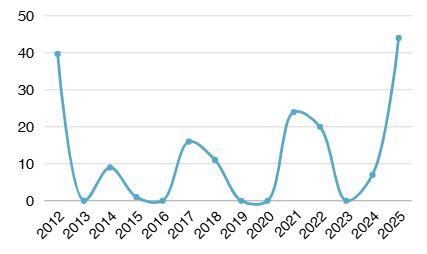
Investment chart per year in millions of USD in the commune of Graneros (2012–2025 period). Source: SEIA.

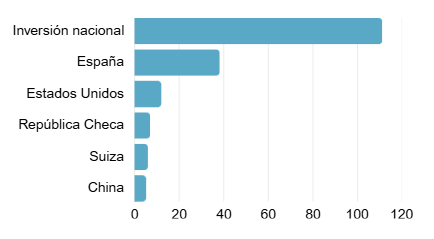
Investment chart by country of origin in millions of USD in the commune of Graneros (2012–2025 period). Source: SEIA.

During the 20th century, the commune of Graneros maintained international relations focused on attracting investment from countries of the Global North, such as the United States (the investing country of the Braden Copper Company), Switzerland (the home country of Nestlé), the United Kingdom (the country of origin of Gilberto Hodkingson, founding partner of the Maestranza Ovalle-Hodkingson, later renamed the Anglo-American Foundry), and Italy (associated with the Fiat company, which operated a factory in Graneros from 1966 to 1981). During the 1950s and 1960s, the commune benefited from resources sent from the United States to Chile during the administration of John F. Kennedy, as part of the Alliance for Progress development plans. It also benefited from the good relations between Chile and Italy during the governments of Jorge Alessandri and Eduardo Frei Montalva, framed within the Christian Democrat International (CDI). These international connections, which had a local territorial impact, prompted the construction of an industrial warehouse that would later house the founding and subsequent consolidation of CORFIAT (the Chilean subsidiary of the Italian Fiat). Later, following the coup d'état of September 11, 1973, the severing of relations between Italy and the Chilean dictatorship was a triggering factor for the factory's closure in 1981.

From 2010 to 2025, the commune of Graneros recorded a cumulative national and international investment of 48.7 million United States dollars (USD) in the period between 2010 and 2015, 36.9 million USD between 2015 and 2020, and 93.9 million USD between 2020 and 2025. With a high level of local attraction for foreign direct investment (FDI), the main international companies investing in Graneros come from countries such as Spain (with investment directed towards the solar energy sector through ownership of the Los Libertadores Photovoltaic Plant by GR Arrayán, the Nan Photovoltaic Plant by GR Hornopirén, and the Alameda Photovoltaic Plant by Sao Paulo Solar), the United States and Germany (Bayer Monsanto), the Czech Republic (Graneros Photovoltaic Park by Solek Holding), Switzerland (Syngenta), and China (through partial ownership of the Candelaria-Nueva Tuniche power transmission line by Transelec).

=== Migration management ===
Since 2018, the commune has had an Office of Immigration and Non-Discrimination, linked to the Directorate of Community Development (DIDECO), which is responsible for guiding the migrant population on visa procedures, work and residence permits, and healthcare, labor, and educational rights. In 2019, Graneros was awarded the Migrant Seal (Sello Migrante) by the National Migration Service.

=== International cooperation ===
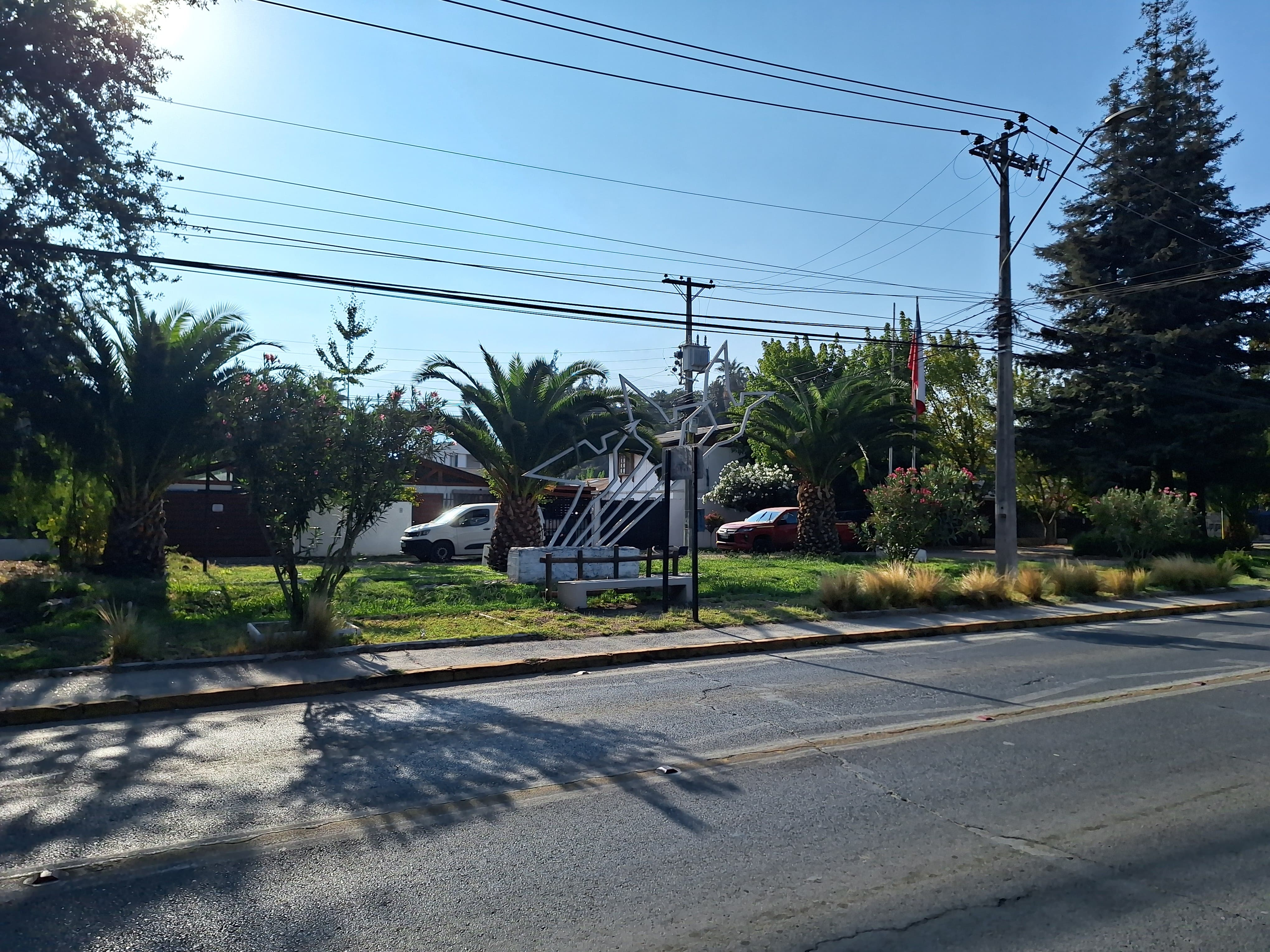
Nelson Mandela Square, Villa El Roble, Graneros.

Since the 2000s, the international relations of the commune of Graneros have been characterized by joint town twinning and international cooperation activities undertaken by the Municipality of Graneros and diplomatic missions from Latin America and the Global South, such as Algeria, Bolivia (focusing on social assistance and municipal administrative management for Bolivian migrant workers, who travel annually to the commune during the summer agricultural season), Brazil (in the field of educational cooperation), Malaysia, and South Africa.

In 2017, the Municipality of Graneros, together with the Embassy of South Africa in Chile, inaugurated the Nelson Mandela public square, located in Villa El Roble (in the north-western sector of the commune), honoring the Nobel Peace Prize laureate and South African leader, a crucial historical figure in the activism against the apartheid regime of racial segregation.

== Transport ==
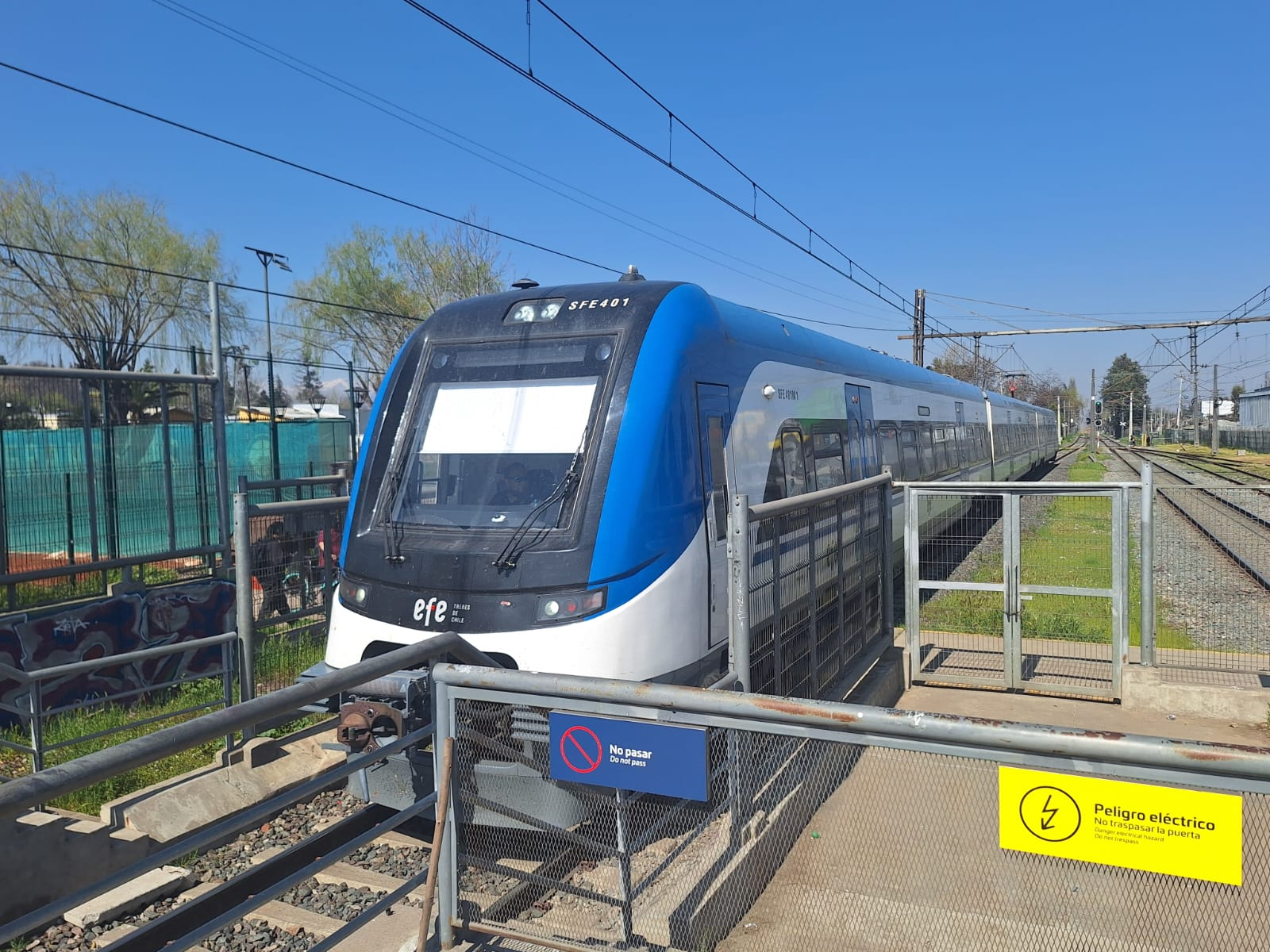
Train Rancagua-Estacion Central in Graneros Station

The commune of Graneros is part of the interregional transport systems connecting the Metropolitan Region of Santiago and the O’Higgins Region, as well as the peri-urban area of the Santiago Metropolitan Area and the Rancagua–Machalí Conurbation, integrating the following intercity services:

- Rancagua–Estación Central Train: Travel time is approximately 1 hour from Estación Central) to Graneros Station, 45 minutes from San Bernardo Station (connection with the Nos–Estación Central Train), and 8 minutes from Rancagua Station.
- San Fernando–Estación Central Train: Travel time is approximately 44 minutes from San Fernando Station to Graneros Station, and 30 minutes from Rengo Station.
- Intercity Buses Rancagua/Santiago: Regular bus services operate from Terminal Sur and Terminal Alameda (both located at the Universidad de Santiago Metro Station), Terminal San Borja (located in Estación Central), and Estación Intermodal Bellavista de La Florida (located at Bellavista de La Florida Metro Station), with an approximate travel time of 1 hour and 30 minutes to the intersection of Ruta Travesía and Av. La Compañía (the commune’s main thoroughfare).

Trans O’Higgins: Public transportation system of the Rancagua–Machalí Conurbation, operating two regular bus routes between Rancagua and Graneros, and one route connecting Rancagua, Graneros, and San Francisco de Mostazal:

- Graneros–Rancagua Route (Graneros–Tuniche/Ruta H-10): Departures from Rancagua Bus Terminal/Ruta H-10 (Av. Salvador Allende)/Av. La Compañía.
- Graneros–Rancagua Route (Graneros–Highway): Departures from Rancagua Bus Terminal/Av. República/Ruta Travesía (former Route 5 South)/Av. La Compañía.
- San Francisco–Graneros–Rancagua Route (San Francisco–Tuniche/Ruta H-10): Departures from Rancagua Bus Terminal/Ruta H-10 (Av. Salvador Allende)/Av. Independencia (San Francisco de Mostazal).

Other Intercity Transport Services: Shared taxi (colectivo) lines operate regular routes connecting Graneros with Rancagua, La Compañía, San Francisco de Mostazal, and Codegua.
