= Colegio de la Preciosa Sangre de Pichilemu =

School in Pichilemu, Region of O'Higgins, Chile

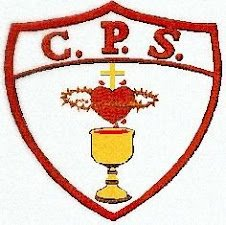
- Colegio de la Preciosa Sangre logo

Location
- Pichilemu, O'Higgins Region; Chile; 34.3900°S 72.0089°W

Information
- Type: Private State-subsidized, primary and secondary school
- Established: April 1947 (as Escuela Doctor Eugenio Díaz Lira)
- Principal: Mother Elizabeth Arriagada Sanzana (2013–present)
- Teaching staff: 29
- Grades: Preschool—12 (Cuarto medio)
- Enrollment: 534 (2015)
- SIMCE average: 264/262 (Mathematics/Language)
- Website: cpspichilemu.cl

Colegio de la Preciosa Sangre de Pichilemu (Note: Several variations of the name of the school are commonly used. Those variations include "Colegio de la Preciosa Sangre", "Colegio Particular de la Preciosa Sangre", and "Colegio Preciosa Sangre". Some sources append "de Pichilemu" to differentiate between the Pichilemu and the Purranque school. The official, full name of both the Pichilemu and Purranque schools is, in Spanish, Colegio Particular de las Misioneras de la Congregación de la Preciosa Sangre de Nuestro Señor Jesucristo. In English, it translates to Particular School of the Missionaries Congregation of the Precious Blood of Our Lord Jesus Christ.) (Spanish pronunciation: [koˈlexjo ðe la pɾeˈsjosa ˈsaŋɡɾe ðe pitʃiˈlemu], 'Pichilemu School of the Precious Blood'), often shortened to Preciosa Sangre, is a coeducational Roman Catholic private state-subsidized day school, serving students in preschool (Chile's pre-kínder) through twelfth grade (cuarto medio), located in the commune of Pichilemu, Libertador General Bernardo O'Higgins Region, Chile.

It was founded in April 1947 by the Chilean Congregation of the Precious Blood as a girls' school under the name of Escuela Doctor Eugenio Díaz Lira. The school has been fully coeducational since March 1979, and was renamed to its current name in 1986. Cardenal Caro Province newspaper El Expreso de la Costa declared Preciosa Sangre to be "the best school in Pichilemu" based on the results of 2011 standardized tests, while O'Higgins Region newspaper El Rancagüino called the school "a regional icon". It is the largest school in Pichilemu, with 534 students in the 2015 school year.

The school offers students several extracurricular activities, in the sports, religious and humanistic areas. Cheer C.P.S., Preciosa Sangre's cheerleading squad, has won several national competitions, and has also participated in two international ones. The school's English debate team, informally called Kick-Ass, reached second position in a regional competition in 2011.

== History ==
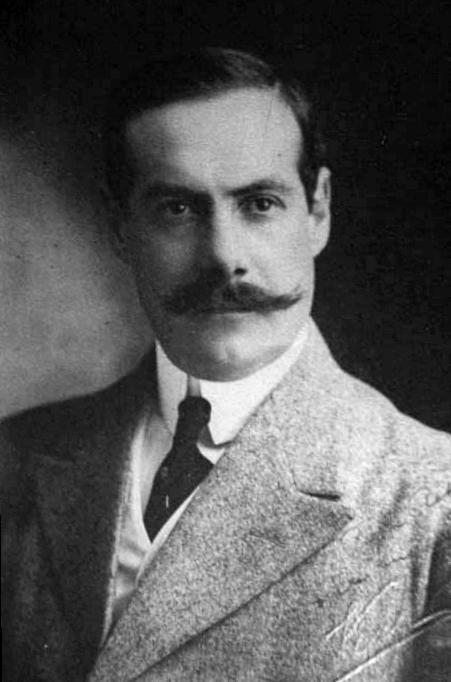
Portrait of Eugenio Díaz Lira

After the commune of Pichilemu was officially created in 1891, Agustín Ross Edwards, a wealthy Chilean writer, member of parliament, government minister and politician, wanted to turn the town into "a touristic place, an elite resort, collecting the most important characteristics of European places, which would make it unique." For this purpose, he constructed a hotel, a post office, a park, among other structures and buildings, which attracted wealthy families from Chile and Argentina. One of those families was that of Maria Luisa Lira Errázuriz, widow of Wenceslao Díaz Gallegos, a well-known physician; Lira, with her ten children, came from her El Olívar estate near San Fernando, and stayed at Ross' facilities in Pichilemu in several occasions.

As years passed, Lira's family decided to visit other beach resorts; however, one of Lira's children, Eugenio, decided to continue visiting Pichilemu, and after he completed his medicine studies in 1904, he constructed a summer house near the center of the town. Eugenio Díaz Lira had a close relationship with several Catholic presbyters and bishops, whom he invited to his summer residence. During his summer stays in Pichilemu, Díaz Lira also created the first medical center in the town called San Rafael. However, he fell ill, and died on 12 June 1945 in Santiago, at age 65.

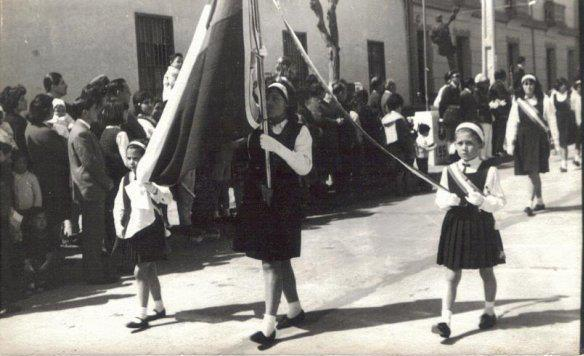
Students of the Escuela Doctor Díaz Lira representing the school in a September 18th Parade

After his death, Díaz Lira's wife and his daughters decided to donate his summer residence to the Chilean Congregation of the Precious Blood of Our Lord Jesus Christ. Under the request of the General Superioress of the Congregation Mother María Úrsula Montes Rojas, the house was turned into a free girls' school, which was founded in April 1947 under the name of Escuela de Niñas Particular N° 16 Doctor Eugenio Díaz Lira (English: Doctor Eugenio Díaz Lira 16th Girls' Private School), in honour of the late physician. The school's main goal was to "educate girls in Catholic values," with the "necessary training for their insertion in the society as Christian mothers and workers with a solid Human Christian formation." The school's first principal was Mother María Teresa Corvalán Guzmán.

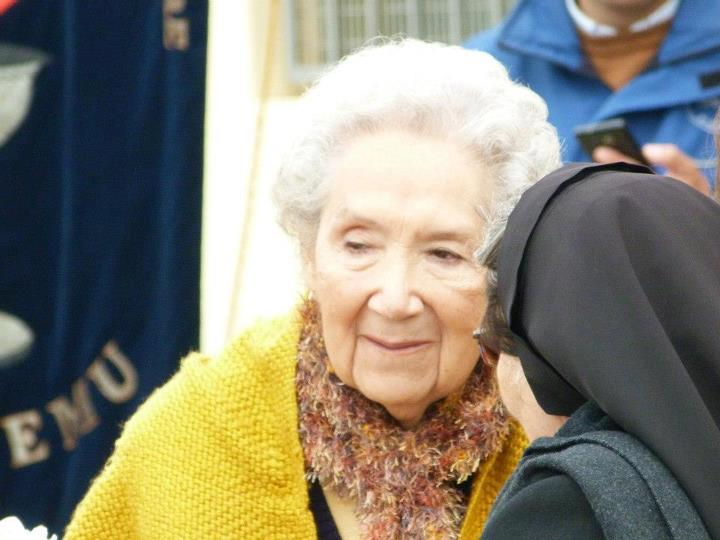
Cristina Barra, pictured here during the inauguration of the preschool building in 2012, was the first teacher to work at the school

The school was recognized by the Ministry of Education of Chile by Decree 12,946, on 31 December 1954. It became a coeducational school in March 1979. During the commemoration of the centennial of the Chilean Congregation of the Precious Blood, the school was renamed to Colegio de la Preciosa Sangre, a name which "represented better the school's founders", on 14 November 1986. The school was authorized to dictate secondary education classes on 30 January 1995, and started doing so that same year, with the first class graduating in 1998.

In 2012, Governor of Cardenal Caro Province Julio Ibarra Maldonado announced the Colegio de la Preciosa Sangre, in addition to several other high schools in the province, would host professional institute IPG (Instituto Profesional IPG), which would let at least 300 people from Pichilemu obtain a technical degree. Also during that year, the school's oldest building, which hosted the preschool classes, was demolished because of the damage it suffered from the 2010 Chile earthquake, and was re-constructed; the new building was inaugurated on 10 September 2012.

== Academics ==
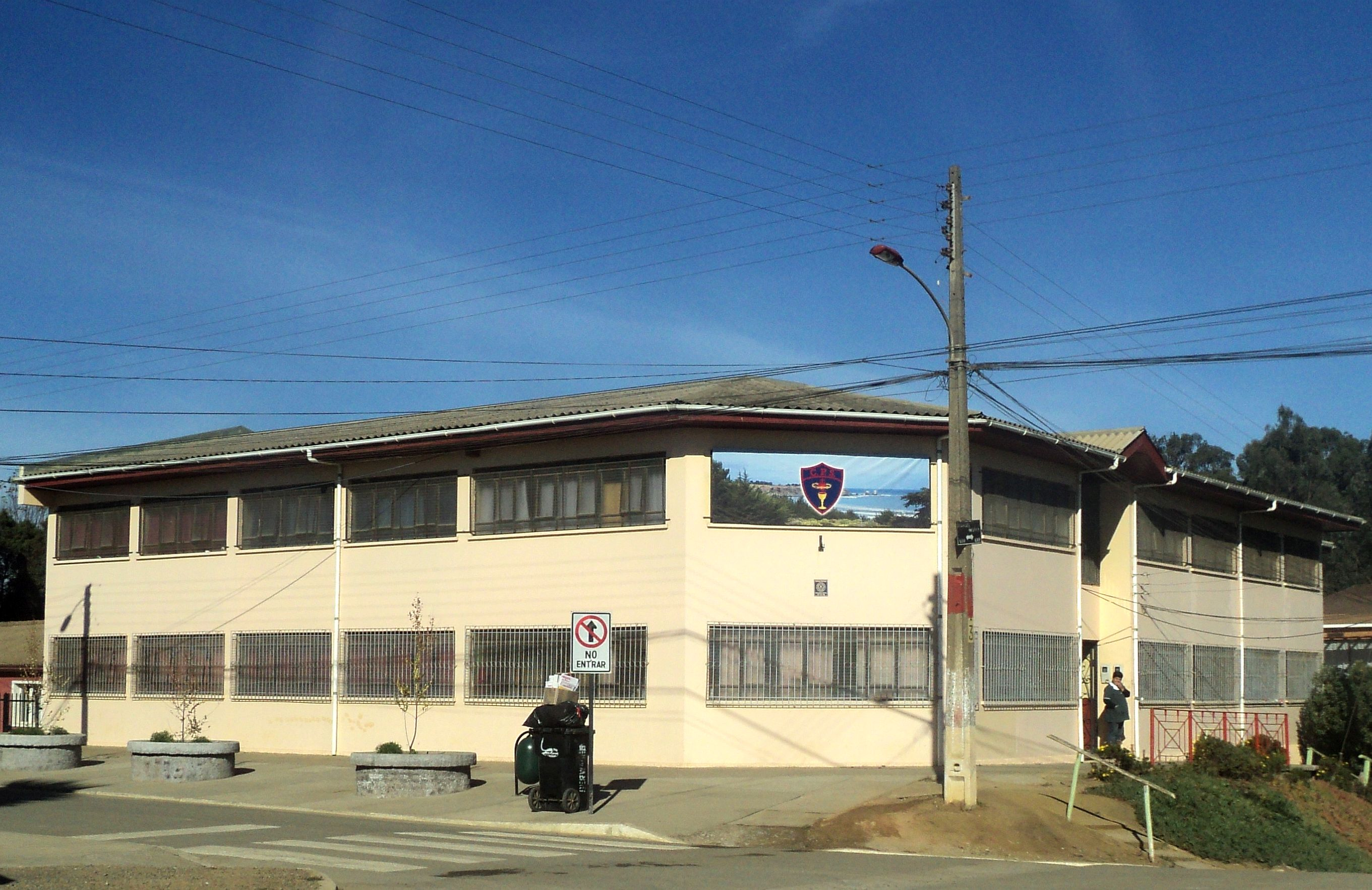
Façade of the Colegio de la Preciosa Sangre secondary building, constructed in 1997

As of 2012, Preciosa Sangre's class schedule varies with the student grade level, up to a maximum of 08:00 to 18:00 with ten periods for high school students. Students are not allowed to leave the school during school hours. Preciosa Sangre aims to give students "integral development, academic excellence", with emphasis in religious values. The school has a Catholic religious orientation.

According to Cardenal Caro Province newspaper El Expreso de la Costa, the school is "the best in Pichilemu", considering the scores obtained in 2011 from the Prueba de Selección Universitaria (PSU), a standardized test for university admissions in Chile. From the 2,945 high schools in Chile with students taking the PSU test, Preciosa Sangre ranked 1328th nationally in 2009. It rose to the 849th position in 2010, and in 2011 it placed 738th.

Preciosa Sangre "ranks higher than similar schools" in the Sistema de Medición de Calidad de la Educación (in English: Education Quality Measurement System, SIMCE) standardized tests, taken to students from fourth, eighth, tenth, and eleventh grades. The tests include reading, mathematics, history and social sciences, natural sciences, and English language.

Test scores

Prueba de Aptitud Académica (PAA)/Prueba de Selección Universitaria (PSU) scores per year (Note: The Prueba de Aptitud Académica (Academic Aptitude Test, or PAA) was the standardized test used in Chile for university admissions until 2002, and since 2003 it has been the Prueba de Selección Universitaria (University Selection Test, or PSU). PAA scores range on an approximate scale from 200–800 points with an average of 500 points, while PSU scores range on a scale from 150–850 points with an average of 500 points.)
School Year	Lang. & Math. Average					Language				Mathematics				History				Science			
School Year	#	A	H	L	NA	#	A	H	L	#	A	H	L	#	A	H	L	#	A	H	L
1999	21	446.7	611.5	356.5	—	21	—	—	—	21	—	—	—	—	—	—	—	—	—	—	—
2000	19	424.0	696.0	303.0	—	19	—	—	—	19	—	—	—	—	—	—	—	—	—	—	—
2001	24	**423.0**	703.5	302.0	—	24	—	—	—	24	—	—	—	—	—	—	—	—	—	—	—
2002	17	427.3	645.0	300.5	—	17	—	—	—	17	—	—	—	—	—	—	—	—	—	—	—
2003	21	467.6	672.5	300.5	513.7	21	—	—	—	21	—	—	—	—	—	—	—	—	—	—	—
2004	26	454.2	576.5	321.5	491.0	26	—	—	—	26	—	—	—	—	—	—	—	—	—	—	—
2005	30	458.9	630.0	333.0	498.6	30	447.3	631	282	30	470.6	629	310	25	457.2	705	360	19	**395.8**	552	**223**
2006	36	459.0	595.5	**289.5**	507.2	36	456.9	602	203	36	461.1	589	**274**	24	**442.1**	613	320	26	401.1	510	307
2007	39	473.8	720.5	313	507.4	39	470.2	648	**193**	39	477.4	**806**	285	23	**505.8**	**769**	327	21	441.2	**679**	250
2008	30	437.1	632.0	324.0	511.7	30	**416.6**	631	300	30	**457.5**	633	312	14	443.0	528	348	19	407.7	613	249
2009	26	465.6	616.0	356.5	513.3	26	450.3	592	309	26	481.0	640	336	9	483.5	564	331	19	424.2	548	319
2010	32	518.0	656.0	357.5	514.0	32	508.4	683	323	32	527.7	684	381	18	504.8	711	360	21	476.4	616	326
2011	32	**529.2**	**741.5**	408.5	511.9	32	**522.2**	**766**	351	32	**536.2**	717	418	23	460.3	681	286	24	475.3	605	362
2012	38	491.8	673.0	330.0	512.9	38	498.8	715	322	38	484.7	668	327	24	482.0	714	**317**	24	487.5	626	371
2013	35	515.3	695.0	341.5	511.5	35	513.8	705	274	35	516.8	685	374	25	488.3	646	359	26	**487.9**	650	261
#: Number of students. A: Average score. NA: National average score. H: Highest score. L: Lowest score. "—" denotes unavailable scores. All-time highest and lowest scores are in **bold** text.

Sistema de Medición de Calidad de la Educación (SIMCE) scores per year
School Year	Grade	#	Reading Comprehension		Mathematics		History, Geography and Social Sciences		Natural Sciences		English language				
School Year	Grade	#	A	NA	A	NA	A	NA	A	NA	LC	RC	A	AS	NA
2008	10th	43	264	—	262	—	—	—	—	—	—	—	—	—	—
2009	4th	44	290	—	280	—	—	—	283	—	—	—	—	—	—
2009	8th	40	256	—	273	—	242	—	258	—	—	—	—	—	—
2010	10th	—	264	—	262	—	—	—	—	—	—	—	—	—	—
2010	11th	36	—	—	—	—	—	—	—	—	48	51	98	2 (6%)	99
2011	8th	—	279	255	284	258	271	261	278	263	—	—	—	—	—
2012	4th	—	262	268	263	262	266	260	—	—	—	—	—	—	—
2012	10th	—	280	278	278	288	—	—	—	—	—	—	—	—	—
2012	11th	35	—	—	—	—	—	—	—	—	52	60	56	6 (17.1%)	49
#: Number of students. A: Average score. LC: Listening comprehension. RC: Reading comprehension. AS: Accredited students (%). NA: National average score (for schools with similar socioeconomic status). "—" denotes test not taken or unavailable scores or data.

== Students and faculty ==
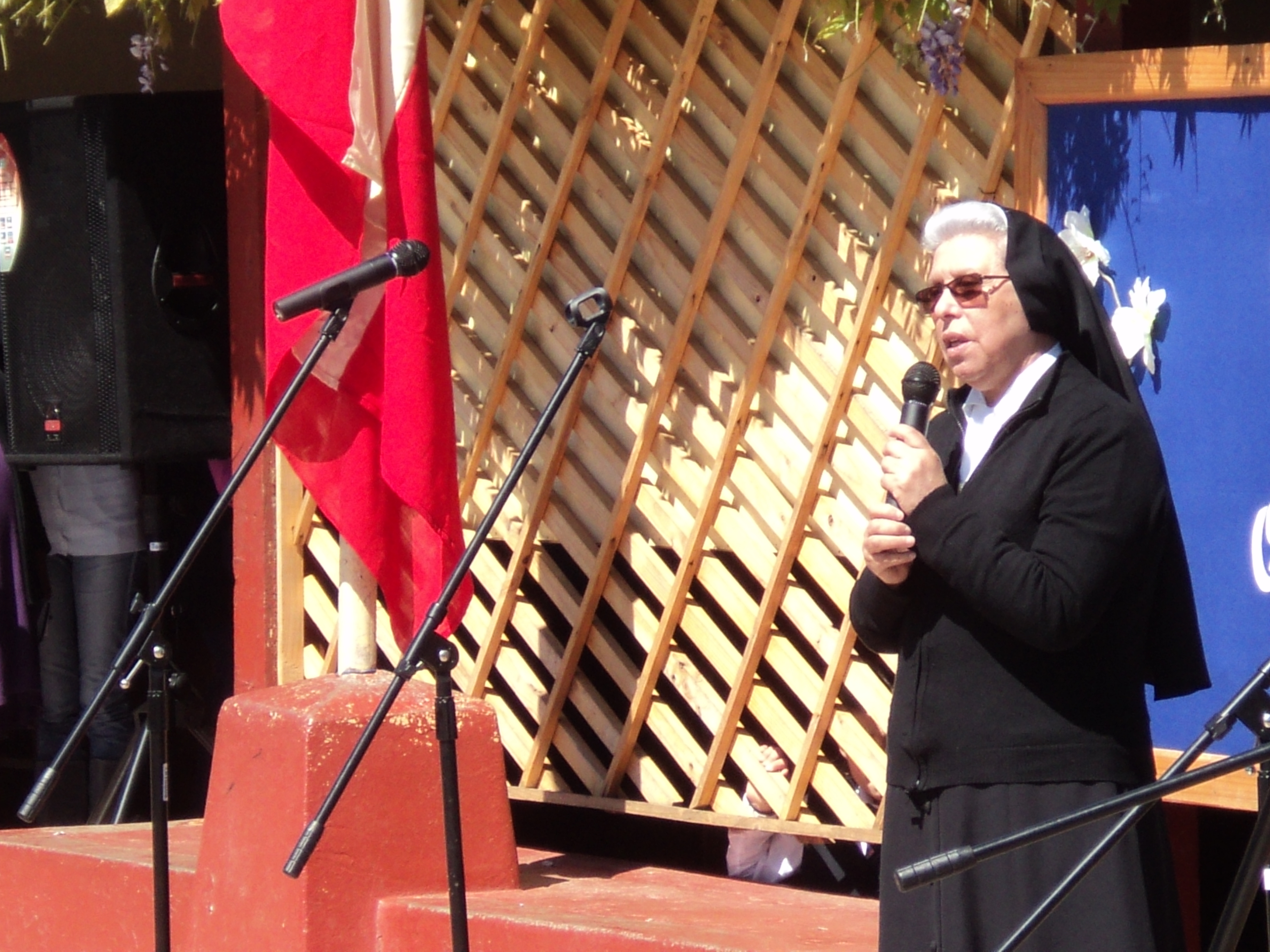
Mother Loreto Fuentes was the principal of Preciosa Sangre between 2006 and 2012.

Enrollment trends, 2006–present
Year	Student body size
2006	501
2007	502
2008	508
2009	548
2010	575
2011	575
2012	558
2013	547
2014	536
2015	534

In the 2015 school year, the Colegio de la Preciosa Sangre had an enrollment of 534 students from preschool (pre-kínder) to twelfth grade (cuarto medio) with an average of 38 per grade. The school serves students aged between 4 and 19 years old. In 2012, 159 students were classified as "prioritary" under the SEP law (Ley de Subvención Escolar Preferencial, Preferential Scholar Subsidy Law in English); "prioritary students" under the SEP law are those whose "homes' socioeconomic status decreases their chance to participate in the educational process." In 2012, Preciosa Sangre's faculty had 30 full-time teachers. By 2014, the faculty had 29 workers.

Admission begins each 1 November and ends on 9 December. Most people apply for entering the preschool (pre-kinder) class, which has a maximum of 35 students. Preference is given to siblings or brothers of current or former Preciosa Sangre students. Applicants must be at least four years old, but in exceptional cases, students not meeting the prescribed age may take a test to be admitted. No payment is required for enrollment.

Colegio de la Preciosa Sangre is governed by the Chilean Congregation of the Precious Blood of Our Lord Jesus Christ. The school's principal was, between 2006 and September 2012, Mother Loreto Fuentes Parra. (Note: Mother Loreto's birth name is, according to a birth certificate obtained from the Civil Registry and Identification Service of Chile, Zaida Ester Fuentes Parra. Her pseudonym Loreto is not used in official documents and websites, such as the Ministry of Education's website Más Información, Mejor Educación (More Information, Better Education); Zaida Ester is used instead.) Mother Loreto was also the school's director in the 1980s; in 1987, she was named by the Colegio Provincial de Profesores Cardenal Caro one of the best teachers in Cardenal Caro Province, in a ceremony held at the school's hall. Since 2013, Preciosa Sangre's principal is Mother Elizabeth Carmen Arriagada Sanzana. The Pedagogical Technical Unit (Unidad Técnica Pedagógica, UTP) is directed since 2011 by teacher Graciela Vargas Urzúa. The school has an administrative staff of 45 people. The parents' center (centro de padres y apoderados) of Preciosa Sangre is presided since 2012 by Mónica Cornejo Rojas.

The students' center (centro de alumnos) of the Colegio de la Preciosa Sangre describes itself as a "representation instance for the school's students, acting in different roles." Students' centers are student organizations, whose members (president, vice president, secretary, among others) are elected democratically by their peers.

== Activities ==
There are numerous extracurricular activities available to Preciosa Sangre students. Excluding those from the sports area, the activities include choir, instrumental, dancing, scientific (Explora), musical drama, handicrafts, folkloric dance (cueca), pastoral, catechesis, language, and mathematics workshops. The school also conducts a preuniversitario, which consists of special courses to prepare the students for the Prueba de Selección Universitaria (PSU) test.

Additionally, an activity known as the Escuela para Padres (School for Parents) takes place every month, in which parents are given advice on how to educate their children.

=== Athletics ===
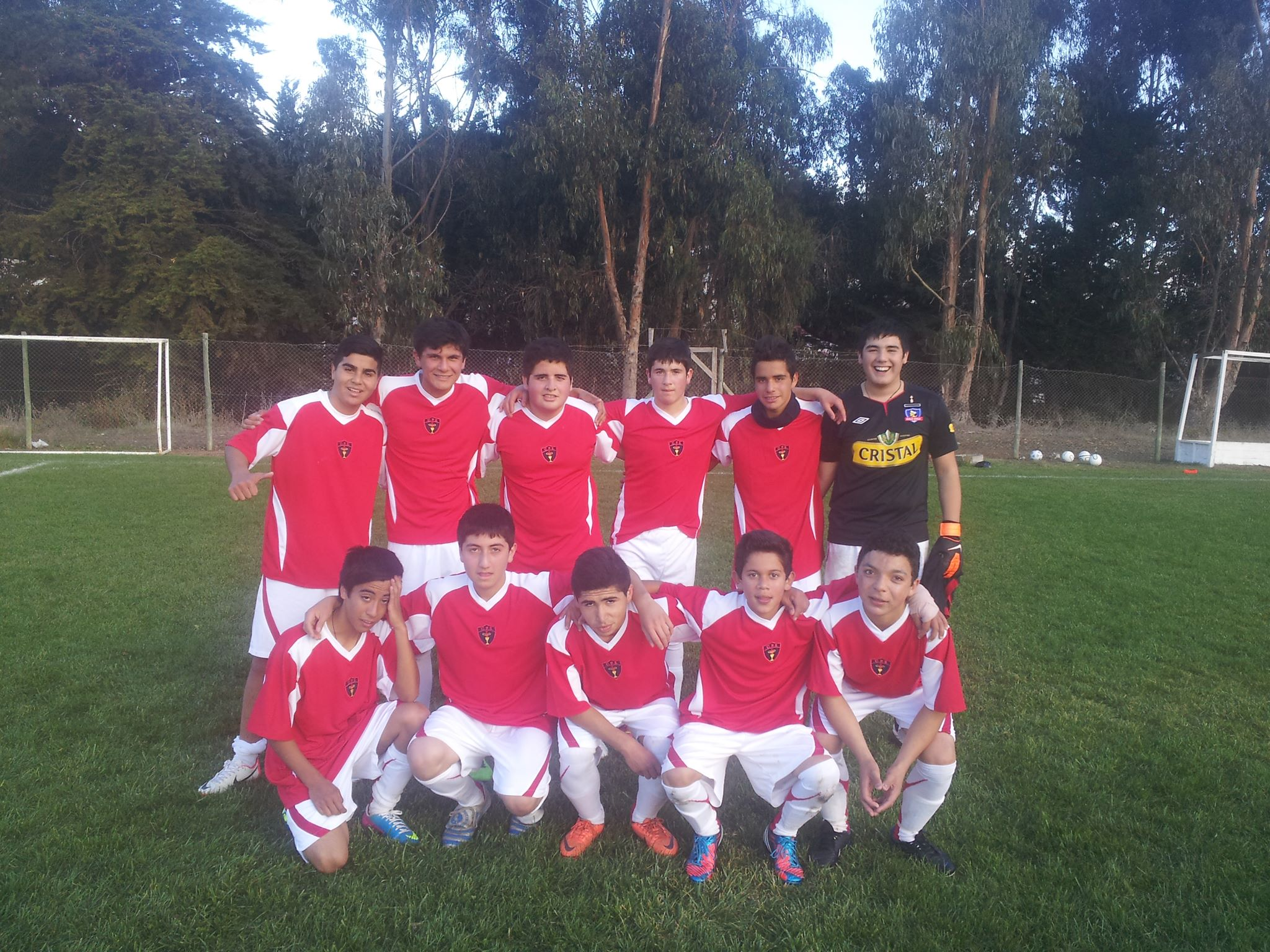
Preciosa Sangre's soccer team, in May 2013

As of 2012, Preciosa Sangre offers seven workshops related to sports. These sports are run by the Club Deportivo Cultural Colegio Preciosa Sangre (Colegio Preciosa Sangre Cultural-Athletic Club), and include football, tennis, volleyball, basketball, gymnastics, cheerleading, and cheerleading for newbies. Preciosa Sangre's athletic club also has hosted tournaments, including CheerPichilemu, a cheerleading competition which, in 2007, had fifteen participating teams. The club has also organized events such as the first family marathon in Cardenal Caro Province (Primera Gran Gorrida Familiar Provincia de Cardenal Caro) in 2011.

Preciosa Sangre's soccer and volleyball teams, Selección Colegio Preciosa Sangre or CPS Pichilemu, compete in the Liga Deportiva Cardenal Caro (Cardenal Caro Athletic League), a provincial-level league. The girls volleyball team placed second in the provincial league, in 2009.

In 2007, Trinidad Segura from the Colegio de la Preciosa Sangre placed first in the Women category of the Campeonato Estudiantil de Surf (Student Surf Championship), which took place in Matanzas beach, in Navidad, and in La Puntilla beach in Pichilemu. In the Primary Students (Men) category, Felipe Sierra and Washington Saldías placed second and third, respectively. The competition was organized by the Commerce Chambers of Navidad and Pichilemu.

==== Cheer C.P.S. ====
Cheer C.P.S.
- Sport: Cheerleading
- Founded: 2007
- Based in: Pichilemu, Chile
- Colors: White and blue
- Owner: Claudio Rojas Covarrubias
- Championships: JAMfest Super Nationals (2009): Senior All-Music (1st), Grand Champion (5th); All Star USA 2013 (2013): 2nd place Jam-Bash Series Orlando (2013): Senior Co-Ed Cheer (Best Choreography)

The cheerleading squad of Preciosa Sangre, Cheer C.P.S., is coached by physical education teacher Claudio Rojas Covarrubias, who founded it in 2007. In 2009, it consisted of 27 students. The team has won several national competitions, two of them making them eligible to participate in competitions held in the United States of America.

2009 US trip

In 2009, Cheer C.P.S. was the only Chilean team to participate in the JAMfest Nationals international tournament in Tampa, USA, reaching the first place in the Senior All-Music category, and fifth in the Grand Champion category, out of more than 150 teams from several countries. Diario VI Región reported Cheer C.P.S. reached the first place of an international team, and fifth overall. The team could participate in the US competition after winning a tournament held in Viña del Mar in 2008.

According to a report by former councilor of Pichilemu Washington Saldías on online newspaper Pichilemu News, there were massive celebrations after a local radio reported the team's achievement. Upon their arrival at Chile, the squad was received at the Palace of La Moneda by Government General Secretary Minister Carolina Tohá, mayor of Pichilemu Roberto Córdova, and Members of the Parliament, before coming back to Pichilemu, on 22 April 2009. Their return to Pichilemu was described by Diario VI Región newspaper as "historic", by saying "at Pichilemu, a historical reception was being prepared, as a multitude of people crowded the streets and avenues at the beach resort, waiting for them, in a journey that ended at Colegio Preciosa Sangre in that city."

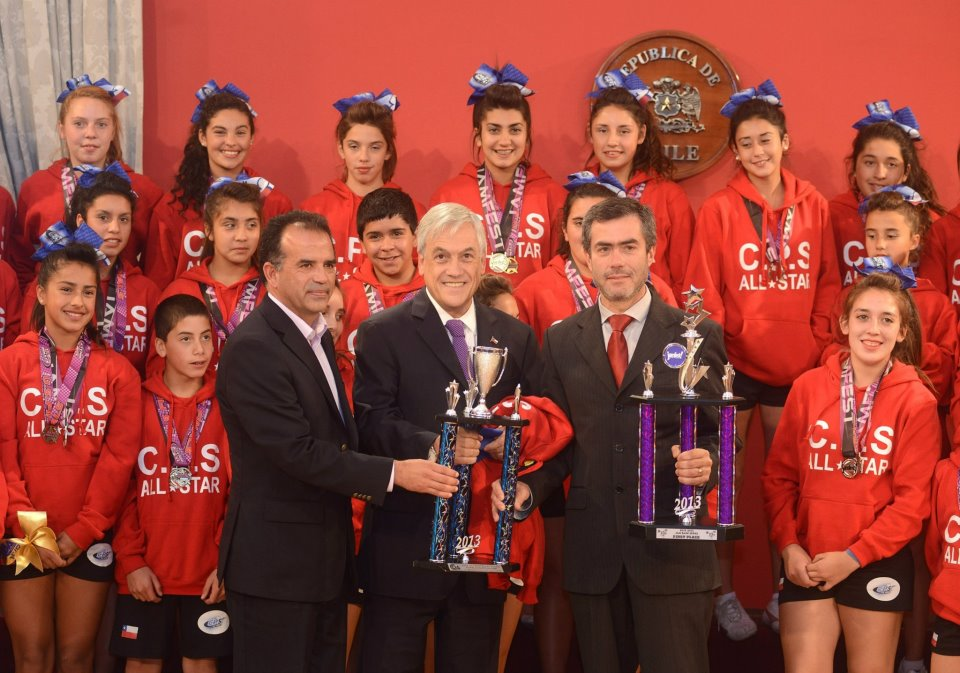
Mayor of Pichilemu Roberto Córdova, President Sebastián Piñera, and Governor of Cardenal Caro Julio Ibarra, with members of Cheer C.P.S., the school's cheerleading squad, in April 2013.

2013 US trip

In 2013, Cheer C.P.S. participated in two international tournaments after winning a national tournament in 2012: All Star USA 2013 and JAMfest Bash Series, both held in Orlando, Florida, United States. The team, composed of 28 teenagers —most of them Preciosa Sangre students— and their teacher Claudio Rojas, collected funds to travel to the United States by participating in several national tournaments and with the help of the municipality of Pichilemu and the O'Higgins Region government. In the All Star USA 2013 competition, held on 30 March 2013, Cheer C.P.S. made it to the second place, only surpassed by an unspecified Russian team, and cheerleader Noemí Pavez obtained the first place in the Jumping category. In the second competition, Jamfest Nationals (Jam-Bash Series Orlando), held on 6 April 2013, they obtained the first place in the Senior (Co-Ed) Cheer, Best Choreography category. After taking knowledge of the news of their accomplishment, Governor of Cardenal Caro Province Julio Ibarra Maldonado said that "Pichilemu is celebrating [their triumph]," something which was also reported by the local media. Upon their arrival in Chile on 9 April, they were received by President Sebastián Piñera at the Palace of La Moneda in Santiago, along with the Governor of Cardenal Caro, and Mayor of Pichilemu Roberto Córdova. The team's achievement was described by news program 24 Horas of state channel Televisión Nacional de Chile as "coming from a distant beach resort in the region of O'Higgins to conquer North American lands."

CheerPichilemu championship

The cheerleading squad has also organized the CheerPichilemu tournament, hosted for the first time on 29 September 2007 at the Municipal Stadium of Pichilemu (Estadio Municipal de Pichilemu). According to Pichilemu News, CheerPichilemu was "the first national open cheerleading tournament." There were four categories in the first edition: Senior Women, Senior Co-Ed, Open Women, Open Co-Ed, and Couples. The competition was supported by the Tourism Chamber of Pichilemu, the local government, and several other institutions and individuals.

=== English debate team ===
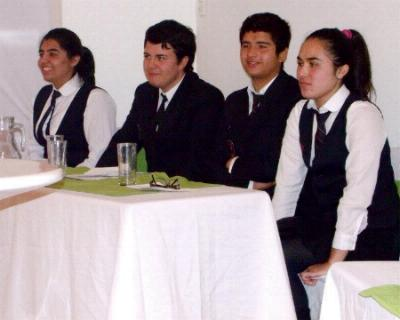
Students from the Kick-Ass English debate team of Preciosa Sangre, May 2012

The English debate team, informally called Kick-Ass, is led by English teacher Natalia Polanco Pino. The team participated for the first time in the National English Debates Tournament organized by the English Opens Doors program from the Chilean Ministry of Education in 2011, and made it to the regional finals, reaching the second place, losing against the San Fernando College team from San Fernando, discussing the topic "This house believes that unhealthy food should be more expensive than healthy food." Despite they only reached the second place in the competition, they were homaged by mayor of Pichilemu Roberto Córdova Carreño, and the Provincial Education Director, Abelardo Sepúlveda Vargas, in a ceremony held at the school on 26 October of that year.

In the 2012 tournament, Preciosa Sangre's team Kick-Ass passed to regional finals, along with the Colchagua Province teams from Liceo Santa Cruz from Santa Cruz, and San Fernando College from San Fernando, and the Cachapoal Province teams from Liceo San José from Requínoa, Liceo Bicentenario Ignacio Carrera Pinto from San Vicente de Tagua Tagua, Liceo Bicentenario Óscar Castro Zúñiga and Colegio Gabriela Mistral, both from Rancagua. The team reached fourth place in the 2012 regional finals, losing against Liceo Bicentenario Óscar Castro Zúñiga. The topic in the regional finals was "This house believes that social media should be censored."

The Preciosa Sangre English debate team participated once again in 2013. They passed to the Ministry of Education's English Debate Tournament regional finals with 173.5 points, the highest score of any of the Region of O'Higgins participant schools. The Preciosa Sangre team was closely followed by the teams of Instituto San Andrés from Rancagua (173 points), San Fernando College from San Fernando (172.5 points), and Liceo Bicentenario Óscar Castro Zúñiga, also from Rancagua (164.5 points). Kick-Ass, however, ultimately lost the regional finals against Colegio San Fernando College; this latter reached the second national place, in August 2013.

Their final participation in the Ministry's English Debate Tournament was in 2014. After obtaining the highest score in their region during a first round of debates, they ultimately obtained the third place in O'Higgins Region after discussing whether "[a]dvertisement aimed at children should be banned".

=== Olimpíadas de Actualidad ===
A team from Preciosa Sangre, led by Spanish language teacher Fabián Valle Silva, participated in the Olimpíadas de Actualidad (News Olympics), a competition organized by the Chilean Asociación Nacional de Prensa (National Press Association), INACAP, and El Rancagüino newspaper. Preciosa Sangre participated for the first time in the 2012 edition, reaching the regional finals. The team placed third, losing against Colegio El Salvador from San Vicente de Tagua Tagua and the Instituto Regional Federico Errázuriz from Santa Cruz.

Preciosa Sangre participated again in the 2013 edition of the Olimpíadas de Actualidad. However, they did not make it to the second round, obtaining the 19th score (32 points) from 22 participating teams.

=== Other activities ===
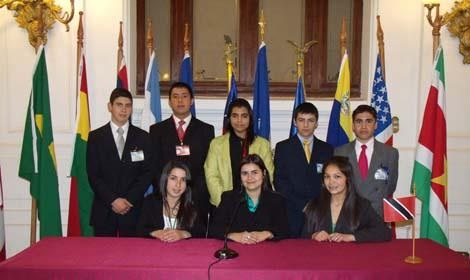
Participants of Colegio de la Preciosa Sangre in the 2011 edition of MOEA (Model of the Organization of American States), of the University of Chile's Institute of Public Affairs

Students from Preciosa Sangre have participated in several competitions and activities besides the English Debates Tournament and the Olimpiadas de Actualidad. One of those activities was the Modelo de la Organización de Estados Americanos (MOEA; Model of the Organization of American States), organized by the Institute of Public Affairs of the University of Chile. With the support of the Governor of Cardenal Caro, Julio Ibarra, seven students represented Preciosa Sangre in the activity, in August 2011. The Preciosa Sangre team was led by history teacher Erna Pereira Arenas, and the students represented the country of Trinidad and Tobago. MOEA took place at the former National Congress in Santiago, and 32 other schools participated. According to Mother Loreto Fuentes Parra, principal of the school, Preciosa Sangre was one of the best three teams in the activity.

A team of second graders from Preciosa Sangre participated in the 2008 edition of a competition called Maratón Minera (Mining Marathon), organized by the Chilean Ministries of Mining and Education. The competition was a four-stage "marathon of knowledge". From the 98 teams from the O'Higgins Region which participated in the competition, only two were awarded a prize, one of them was Colegio de la Preciosa Sangre, whose team Los Cuchitos was given an honorific mention.

In the first edition of Sé Reportero (Be a Reporter), a competition organized in 2011 by national newspaper El Mercurio and educarchile, Diego Grez Cañete from Preciosa Sangre was awarded the second place in the Opinion Column category, with an article called "¿Educación gratuita?" ("Free education?"). In 2012, the same student earned an honorific mention for his tale "Es un lindo día" (It's a Beautiful Day) from the Andrés Bello University's Interescolar de Cuentos en Español (Interschool Contest of Spanish-language Tales). "Es un lindo día" was published in a book commemorating the interschool contest of that year.

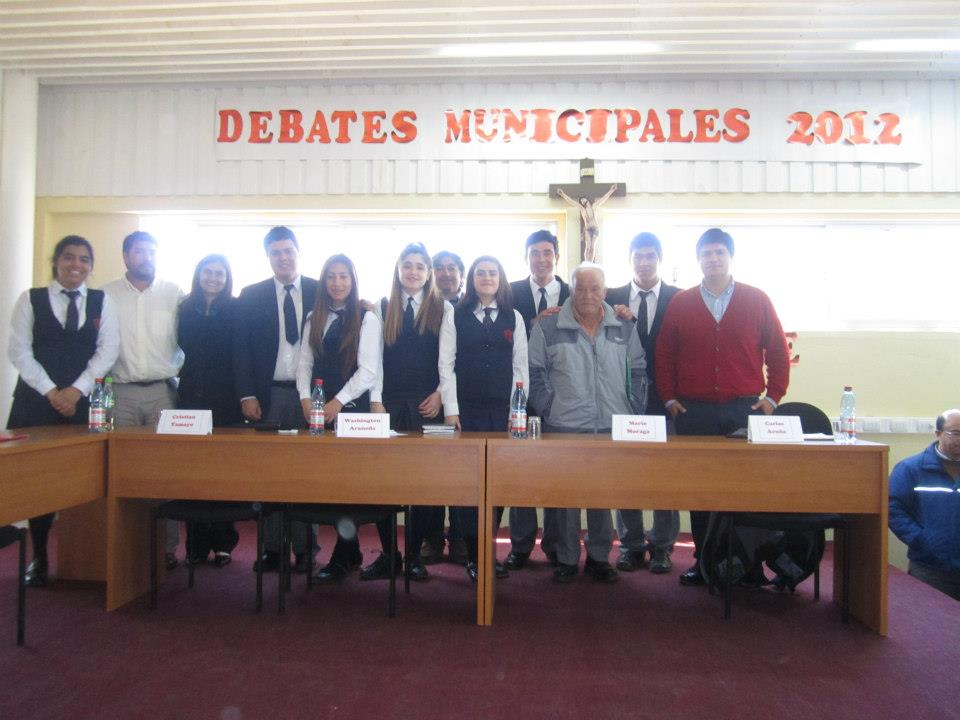
Preciosa Sangre students with four of the six candidates for mayor of Pichilemu after the municipal debate held at the school in October 2012

In October 2012, a group of eleventh and twelfth grade Preciosa Sangre students, led by history teacher Erna Pereira Arenas, organized a debate (Spanish: debate municipal) between candidates for mayor of Pichilemu, which was held on the 23 of that month, just five days before the election took place. Candidates Mario Moraga Cáceres (independent), Washington Araneda Carrasco (Progressist Party), Cristián Tamayo Latapiat (independent), and Carlos Acuña Arévalo (National Renewal) participated. According to Jorge Nasser Guerra from Radio Entreolas, and an article published on Diario VI Región, Roberto Córdova Carreño, who was eventually elected, rejected to participate in the debate because he "would not attend that kind of events", while Iván Cabrera Martínez "never responded the students' invitation". Some of the issues discussed in the debate were "municipal and higher education, health, urbanization, municipal corruption," amid other topics. The debate was broadcast live on local radio stations Entreolas and Isla FM. The debate was praised by local online newspaper Pichilemu News for being "the first ever debate held in Pichilemu" and "whose planification took care of every detail".

Every year, Preciosa Sangre celebrates its anniversary in October or November, with activities and games during two days; those include basketball, football, and Chilean games. The school is divided in two groups or alliances; in 2011, there was a red and a white alliance. The celebrations conclude with the presentation of carnival floats created by every alliance, and a gala party. During the 2012 celebrations, both alliances recorded a parody of the "Gangnam Style" music video by South Korean entertainer PSY; since the videos were uploaded to YouTube, the red alliance video reached almost 4,000 views as of February 2013, while in contrast, the white alliance video has only reached 1,800 in the same time span.

== Notable alumni ==
Among former students of the Colegio de la Preciosa Sangre de Pichilemu are Jorge Vargas González (born 1966), a local politician who served as councilor of Pichilemu between 1992 and 1996, and later as mayor of the commune, between 1996 and 2007; and Rebeca Cofré Calderón (born 1962), current mayor of Chépica, in Colchagua Province, who initially took office in December 2008 and was re-elected in 2012 to a second term.
