= Preciosa Sangre (disambiguation) =

Preciosa Sangre, or Colegio de la Preciosa Sangre de Pichilemu, is a school in Chile.

Preciosa Sangre may also refer to:

- Blood of Christ
- Colegio Preciosa Sangre (Purranque), Chile

== See also ==
- Sangre (disambiguation)
- Missionaries of the Precious Blood
