= La Nación (Chile) =

Chilean newspaper

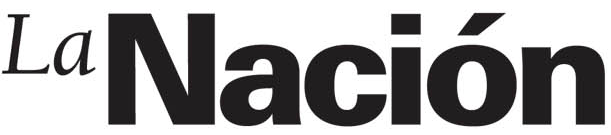
- Front page of La Nación's penultimate number, on 16 December 2010 (the final number was published three days later, on 19 December 2010). Front page of La Nación's penultimate number, on 16 December 2010.
- Type: Daily newspaper
- Format: Tabloid
- Owner: State of Chile (69%)
- Founded: 14 January 1917
- Ceased publication: 17 December 2010 (print)
- Headquarters: Santiago, Chile
- Website: www.lanacion.cl

La Nación is a Chilean newspaper created in 1917 by Eliodoro Yáñez and presided until 1927 by Carlos Dávila. It was a private company until 1927, when it was expropriated by dictator Carlos Ibáñez del Campo, and has remained a state property till 2014. Currently it is owned by Comunicaciones LANET S.A..

Is published by the SA La Nacion newspaper company that also publishes the Official Journal of the Republic of Chile. Company revenues come primarily from sales of the Official Journal and the printing division of the company, and currently the market share of the newspaper (except La Nación Domingo, the Sunday edition) is marginal, due to its low circulation.

== Foundation and expropriation ==
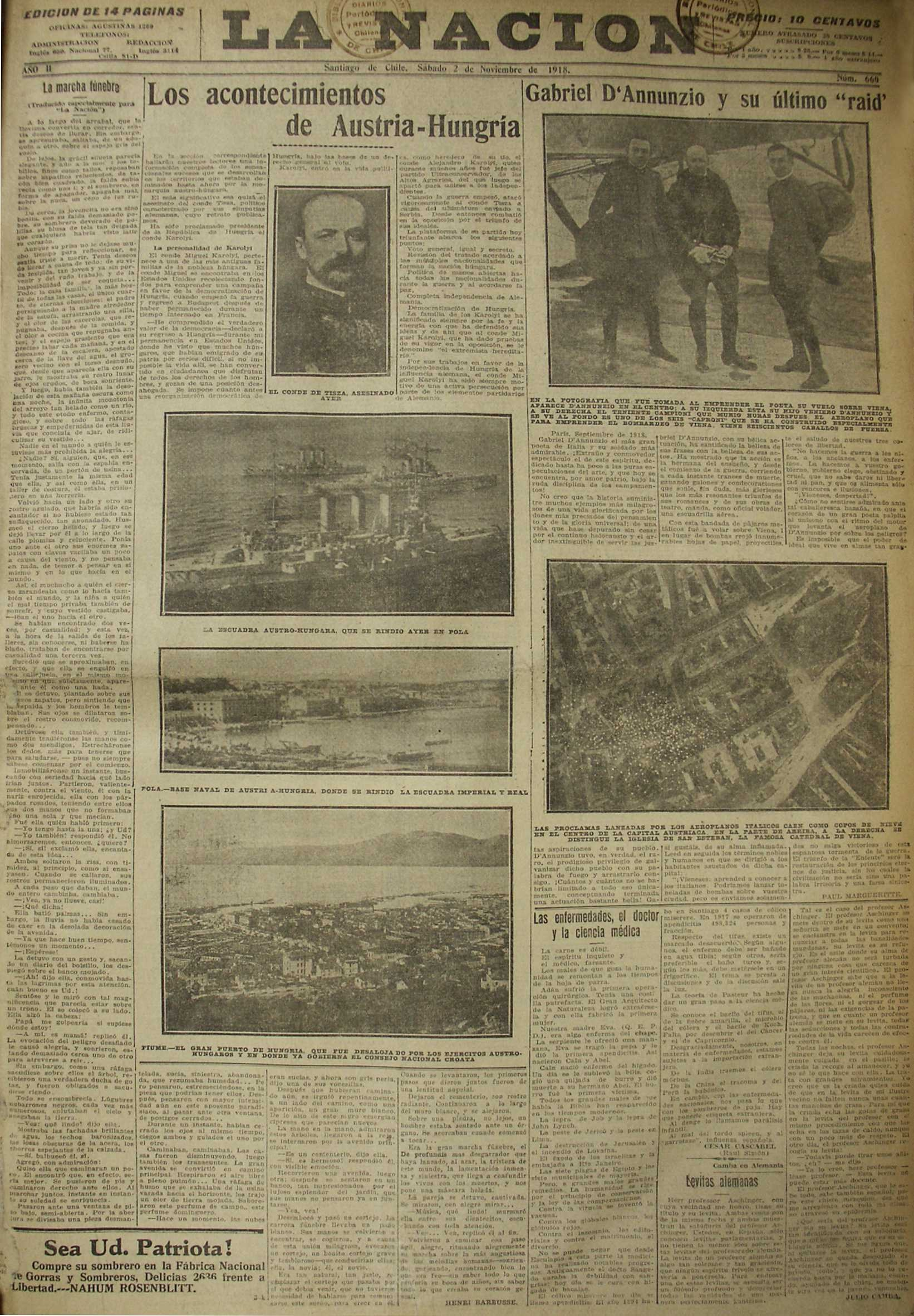
2 November 1918 issue of La Nación.

The newspaper La Nacion was created in 1917 as a way to deliver information and compete with other newspapers of Santiago (El Mercurio, Las Ultimas Noticias, El Diario Ilustrado, among others). According to its founder, Eliodoro Yáñez, should give "priority attention to social problems affecting the population that represents the activity of labor and economic progress."

In July 1927, during his dictatorial regime, General Carlos Ibanez del Campo expropriated the newspaper, which became the medium and official government spokesman. After that, its rightful owner, Eliodoro Yanez, left Chile, remaining in exile until 1931. Back in his country, its efforts to recover the newspaper La Nacion were in vain and died in 1933, without receiving compensation. Until today the Chilean State has not assumed debt to the descendants of Eliodoro Yáñez, as regards the daily La Nación.

== Changes under the military regime ==
The newspaper circulated continuously until the coup of September 11, 1973. Six days later, the newspaper was operated by the Armed Forces of Chile and was renamed La Patria (The Fatherland), and later, in 1975, El Cronista (The Chronist). Only on June 3, 1980 (almost seven years after its last edition), again called La Nación as such, however, their numbers continued as normal.

During the 1980s, La Nación became the official means the government of Augusto Pinochet, on several occasions including various writings and publications of a propaganda. it also began imitating the model introduced by the magazine Ercilla, delivering free books from leading writers.

== Government endorsed newspaper of the Concertación ==
In a fierce defense of the military government, a day to day, on 12 March 1990, the newspaper changed to a center-left line. On March 5 and 6, 1991, La Nacion published in full the "Rettig Report", released by President Patricio Aylwin on March 4 that year.

During the 1990s, the nation will achieve sales soaring at times, especially when it published the results of the Scholastic Aptitude Test (PAA), the SIMCE, or housing subsidies. At present, the results of the University Selection Test (PSU, which replaced the PAA) are published by El Mercurio, those in SIMCE by La Tercera, and the housing subsidy by La Cuarta.

== Sebastián Piñera government ==
In 2009, the then presidential candidate Sebastián Piñera, the center-right Coalition for Change, showed their displeasure with the coverage that The Nation was the candidate of the Concertación, Eduardo Frei Ruiz-Tagle, who had become manifest "firmly convinced that the best thing for Chile is to close the newspaper La Nación", In addition to preventing journalists from entering the newspaper to a massive campaign event held in the Arena Santiago. However, after that, Piñera recanted, stating that "The Nation newspaper will be a pluralistic, respectful, and will have a similar status and similar to TVN", which was confirmed after his election by his spokeswoman, Ena von Baer.

The day I took office Piñera, 11 March 2010, was appointed new directors at the Company Journalistic La Nación SA, all close to the Coalition for Change, Daniel Platovsky (RN), who became president of the board, Cristina Bitar (UDI), Hernán Larraín Matte (son of Deputy Minister Hernán Larraín and Magdalena Matte) and Gonzalo Müller (UDI).

== Owners ==
Currently the company is owned daily Empresa Periodística La Nación, a company formed by shares Class A and B. Class B shares (69%) are in the hands of the state. The remaining 31% for Class A shares are mostly owned by the company Colliguay SA composed of three individuals.
