= Cofré =

Cofré is a surname. Notable people with the surname include:

- Paty Cofré (born 1939), Chilean comedian and vedette
- Rebeca Cofré (born 1962), Chilean politician
