= La Finca, Santa Cruz =

Coordinates: 33°03′S 70°57′W

La Finca
- Village
- Interactive map of La Finca
- Country: Chile
- Region: (O'Higgins Region) O'Higgins
- Provinces: Colchagua
- City: Santa Cruz

Government
  - Mayor of Santa Cruz: William Arévalo

La Finca is a village located in the Chilean commune of Santa Cruz, Colchagua Province.
