= Villa Alegre =

Villa Alegre may refer to:

- Villa Alegre, Chile, a commune in Chile
- Villa Alegre, Santa Cruz a neighborhood in Santa Cruz, Chile
- Villa Alegre (TV series)
