= Federico Errázuriz =

Federico Errázuriz may refer to:

- Federico Errázuriz Zañartu (1825–1877), president of Chile from 1871 to 1876
- Federico Errázuriz Echaurren (1850–1901), president of Chile from 1896 to 1901
- Federico Errázuriz Echenique (1880–1903), Chilean politician
- Federico Errázuriz Regional Institute, an institute in Santa Cruz, Chile
