= La Patagüilla =

Coordinates: 34.173°S 71.330°W

- Village
- Interactive map of La Patagüilla
- Country: Chile
- Region: (O'Higgins Region) O'Higgins
- Provinces: Colchagua
- City: Santa Cruz

Government
  - Mayor of Santa Cruz: William Arévalo

La Patagüilla is a village located in the Chilean commune of Santa Cruz, Colchagua province.
