= El Tambo, Santa Cruz =

- Village
- Location within Chile
- Country: Chile
- Region: (O'Higgins Region) O'Higgins
- Provinces: Colchagua
- City: Santa Cruz

Government
  - Mayor of Santa Cruz: William Arévalo

El Tambo, Santa Cruz is a village located in the Chilean commune of Santa Cruz, Colchagua province.
