= San José de Apalta =

Coordinates: 34°37′58″S 71°15′24″W

- Village
- Interactive map of San José de Apalta
- Country: Chile
- Region: (O'Higgins Region) O'Higgins
- Provinces: Colchagua
- City: Santa Cruz

Government
  - Mayor of Santa Cruz: William Arévalo

San José de Apalta is a village located in the Chilean commune of Santa Cruz, Colchagua province.
