= La Lajuela =

Coordinates: 34°39′57″S 71°25′45″W

- Village
- Interactive map of La Lajuela
- Country: Chile
- Region: (O'Higgins Region) O'Higgins
- Provinces: Colchagua
- City: Santa Cruz

Government
  - Mayor of Santa Cruz: William Arévalo

La Lajuela is a village located in the Chilean commune of Santa Cruz, Colchagua province.
