= Cunaquito =

- Village
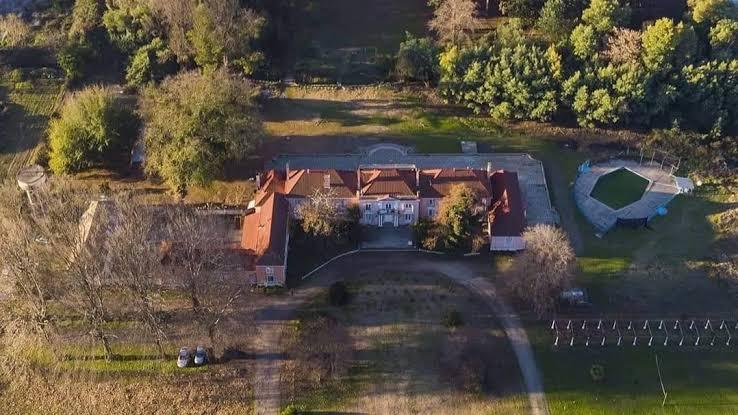
- Hogar Estudiantil de Cunaquito from above
- Country: Chile
- Region: (O'Higgins Region) O'Higgins
- Provinces: Colchagua
- City: Santa Cruz

Government
  - Mayor of Santa Cruz: William Arévalo

Cunaquito is a village located in the Chilean commune of Santa Cruz, Colchagua province.

== History ==
The history of the village is strongly tied to the old Hacienda Cunaco and the former historical estate of Fundo Cunaquito, which was expropriated in the 1970 agrarian reform and transformed into a public student residence.
