= La Isla =

La Isla (Spanish for The Island) may refer to:

- La isla (film) or The Island, a 1979 Argentine film
- Isla de Yáquil or La Isla, a town in Chile
- La Isla (Rengo), a village and a former subdelegation in Rengo commune, Chile
- La Isla (wetland), Bogotá, Colombia
- La Isla (Colunga), a civil parish in Asturias, Spain
- La isla: desafío extremo, an American reality television series
- La Isla (telenovela), a Puerto Rican telenovela
