= Teresa Núñez =

Teresa Núñez may refer to:

- Teresa Núñez (volleyball) (born 1951), Chilean volleyball player
- Teresa Núñez Cornejo (born 1965), Chilean public administrator and politician
