= Isla del Guindo =

Coordinates: 34°39′S 71°20′W

- Village
- Interactive map of Isla del Guindo
- Country: Chile
- Region: (O'Higgins Region) O'Higgins
- Provinces: Colchagua
- City: Santa Cruz

Government
  - Mayor of Santa Cruz: William Arévalo

Isla del Guindo is a village located in the Chilean commune of Santa Cruz, Colchagua province.
