= Quinahue =

Coordinates: 34°42′S 71°19′W

- Village
- Interactive map of Quinahue
- Country: Chile
- Region: (O'Higgins Region) O'Higgins
- Provinces: Colchagua
- City: Santa Cruz

Government
  - Mayor of Santa Cruz: William Arévalo

Quinahue is a village located in the Chilean commune of Santa Cruz, Colchagua province. It used to be an independent commune, until it was annexed to Santa Cruz in 1927, by the Decree given by President Carlos Ibáñez del Campo.
