= Los Maitenes, Santa Cruz =

- Neighbourhood
- Country: Chile
- Region: (O'Higgins Region) O'Higgins
- Provinces: Colchagua
- City: Santa Cruz

Government
  - Mayor of Santa Cruz: William Arévalo

Los Maitenes, Santa Cruz is a neighbourhood located in the Chilean commune of Santa Cruz, Colchagua province.
