= Sangre de Cristo =

Sangre de Cristo (Spanish: "blood of Christ") can refer to:

- Sangre de Cristo Mountains, in Northern New Mexico and South-Central Colorado in the United States
- Sangre de Cristo Pass, a mountain pass in the Sangre de Cristo Mountains.
- Sangre de Cristo Creek, in Costilla County, Colorado
- Sangre de Cristo Range, the northernmost portion of the Sangre de Cristo Mountains, located entirely in Colorado
- Sangre de Cristo Wilderness, a long and narrow wilderness area of the Sangre de Cristo Range centered about Saguache and Custer counties, Colorado.
- Sangre de cristo, a spicier variant of the Michelada beer cocktail
- Sangre de Cristo Seminary and School for Biblical Studies was incorporated in 1976 as a non-profit organization.
- Sangre de Cristo Formation, a geologic formation in Colorado.
- Sangre de Cristo Ranches, Colorado, an unincorporated community located near Fort Garland in Costilla County, Colorado
- Sangre de Cristo National Heritage Area, in Colorado

== See also ==
- Sangre (disambiguation)
