= Julio Ibarra =

Chilean politician (born 1966)

Julio Ibarra Maldonado
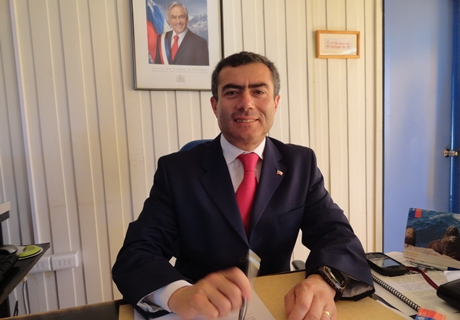
- Official portrait of Governor Ibarra, 2012.

9th Governor of Cardenal Caro Province
- In office 16 March 2010 – 12 March 2014
- President: Sebastián Piñera Echenique
- Preceded by: Loreto Puebla Muñoz
- Succeeded by: Teresa Núñez Cornejo

Councillor of Pedro Aguirre Cerda
- In office 2000–2004

Personal details
- Born: July 15, 1966 (age 60) Las Cabras, Chile
- Party: National Renewal (RN)
- Spouse: Carla García
- Children: Diego Ibarra García (born 1996)
- Education: Instituto Iplacex
- Website: Ibarra at the Government of Cardenal Caro Province website

Julio Diego Ibarra Maldonado (born July 15, 1966) is a Chilean politician. Ibarra was the Governor of Cardenal Caro Province since he was appointed by President of Chile Sebastián Piñera on March 16, 2010. He left office on March 12, 2014.

Between 2000 and 2004, Ibarra had also worked as Councillor of the commune of Pedro Aguirre Cerda in the Santiago Metropolitan Region.

== Early life ==
Julio Ibarra was born on July 15, 1966. He is a native of Las Cabras, O'Higgins Province, and studied Public Administration, specializing in Finance, in the Instituto Iplacex. Ibarra also studied at the Escuela de Carabineros de Chile between 1987 and 1988 in order to become a police officer.

From 1990 to 2002, Ibarra was a publicity and textile businessman. Between 2003 and 2010, he worked as co-administrator and backer of the Escuela Particular Diego Thompson in San Ramón, Santiago Metropolitan Region.

== Political career ==
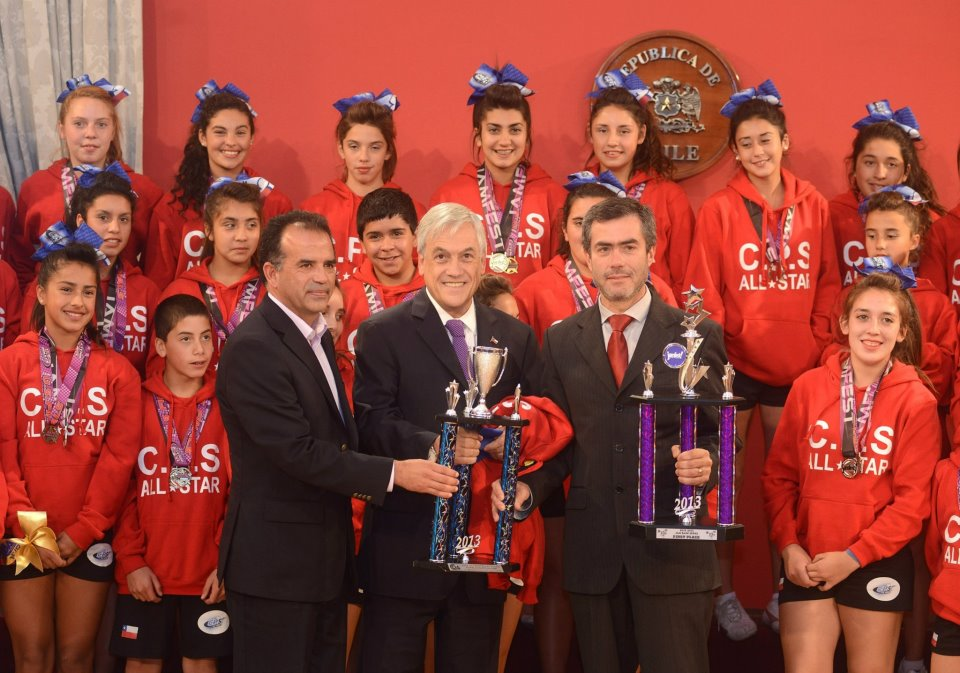
Mayor of Pichilemu Roberto Córdova, President Sebastián Piñera and Ibarra, with members of Cheer C.P.S., the Colegio de la Preciosa Sangre de Pichilemu cheerleading squad, in April 2013.

Ibarra was elected Councillor of Pedro Aguirre Cerda, a commune in the Santiago Metropolitan Region, in 2000 with 5631 (9,46%) from the 59526 total votes, and held the charge until 2004.

On March 16, 2010, Julio Ibarra was appointed Governor of Cardenal Caro Province by President Sebastián Piñera. Ibarra had worked with Piñera during his 2010 presidential campaign as head of campaign operations in the Santiago Metropolitan Region.

Ibarra first appeared in public in this role on March 17, along with Intendant of O'Higgins Region Rodrigo Pérez Mackenna, and Eduardo Cornejo Lagos and Marie Jeanne Lyon Amand de Mendieta, the recently appointed Governors of Colchagua and Cachapoal Provinces respectively.

Julio Ibarra assumed his position as governor of Cardenal Caro just after a devastating earthquake on February 27 that devastated central Chile, including the province, and another earthquake on March 11, centered in province capital Pichilemu.

== Personal life ==
Ibarra is married to Carla García. They have one child, named Diego Ignacio Ibarra García (born February 6, 1996).

Political offices
Preceded by Claudina Núñez Jiménez; Margarita Pizarro Uyevich; Rolando Polanco Inostroza; Juan Michel Salazar; Mario Marroquín Alcayaga; Juan Luis Lemuñir Epuyao; Manuel Palacios	Councillor of Pedro Aguirre Cerda; 2000–2004; With: Claudina Núñez Jiménez; Mario Palestro Contreras; Eduardo Pastene Azola; Juan Luis Lemuñir Epuyao; José Rosende Valle; Angélica Casas-Cordero Marcoleta	Succeeded by Ernesto Segundo Araneda Briones; Mario Palestro Contreras; Rolando Polanco Inostroza; Eduardo Pastene Azola; Angélica Casas-Cordero Marcoleta; Margarita Pizarro Uyevich; Carmen Salinas Jara; Juan Luis Lemuñir Epuyao
Preceded by Loreto Puebla Muñoz	Governor of Cardenal Caro Province; 16 March 2010–12 March 2014	Succeeded by Teresa Núñez Cornejo
