= Sangre =

Sangre may refer to:

- Sangre, a fictional Earth-like planet in the science fiction novel The Men in the Jungle by Norman Spinrad
- Sangre (comics), the de facto leader of the Marvel Comics supervillain group Children of the Vault
- Sangre (film), a 2005 Mexican drama film.
- "Sangre" (song), a song by Thalía.
- Licania platypus, a tree native to Central America

== See also ==
- Sangre de Cristo (disambiguation)
- Preciosa Sangre (disambiguation)
- Encantadia Chronicles: Sang'gre, a 2025 Philippine television drama fantasy series of GMA Network
- La Luna Sangre, a 2017-2018 Philippine television drama fantasy series of ABS-CBN
