= Paniahue =

Coordinates: 34°37′S 71°22′W

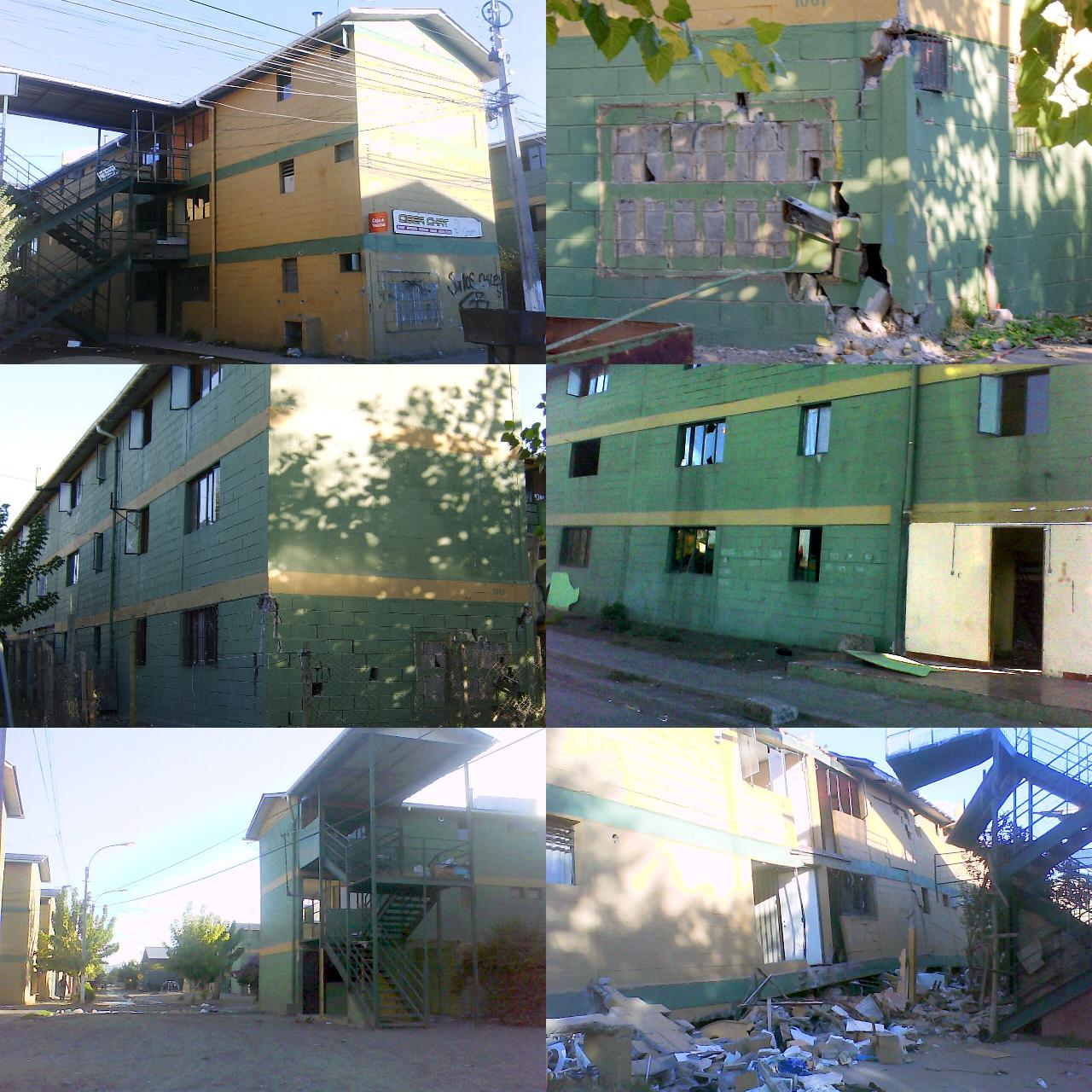
Damage on Paniahue apartments after 2010 Chile earthquake.

Paniahue (Mapudungun: proper place to take the glare) is a Chilean village located north of Santa Cruz, Colchagua Province, O'Higgins Region.

In 1899, it had 1,055 inhabitants, its own post office and a free public school. It currently has 2,526 inhabitants.

== History ==
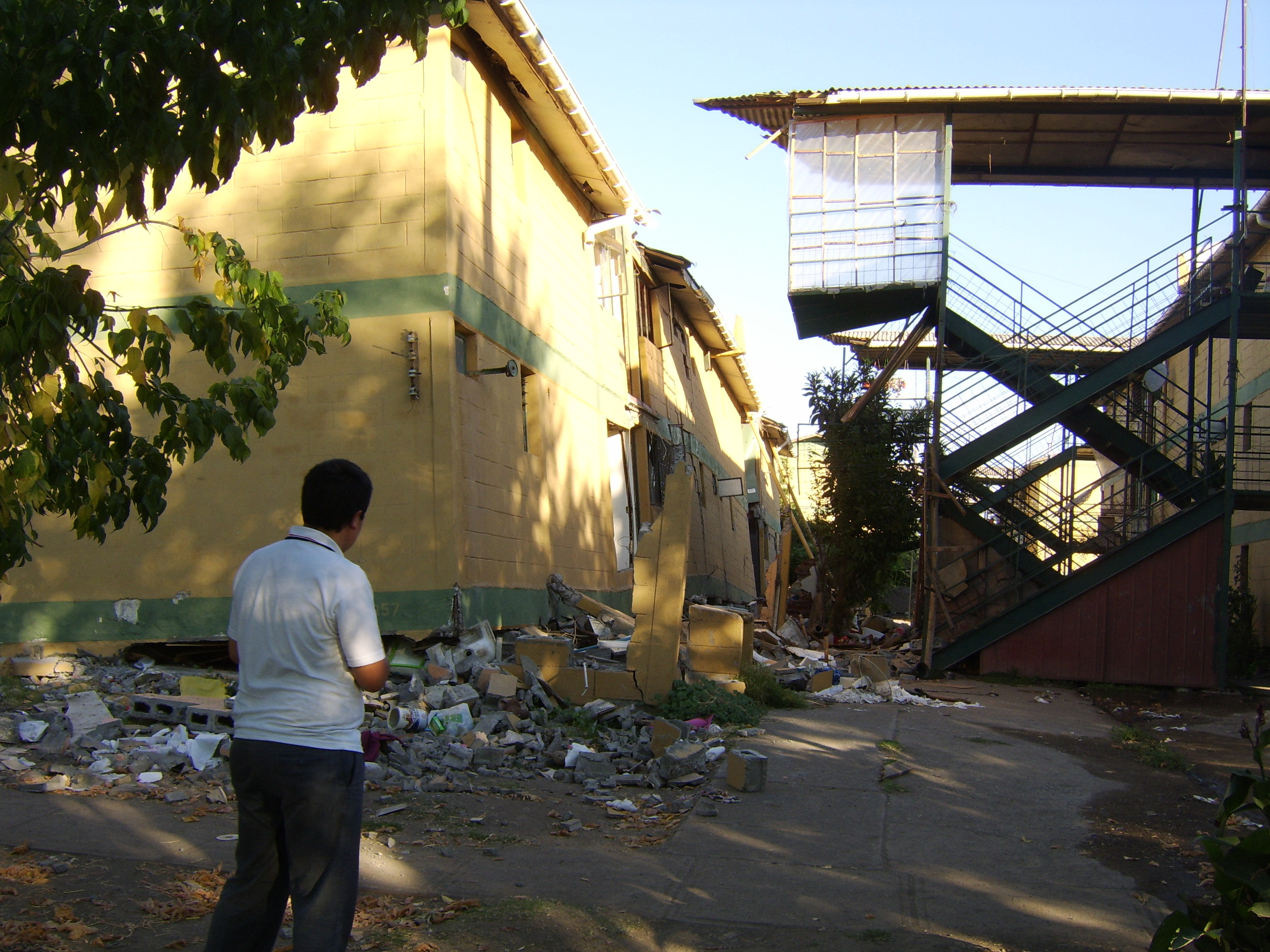
Destroyed apartments in Paniahue

The village was greatly damaged by the 2010 Chile earthquakes, and the Paniahue apartments became an icon of the earthquake.

== See also ==
- Deportes Paniahue
