= Church of Santa Cruz (Santa Cruz, Chile) =

Church in O'Higgins, Chile

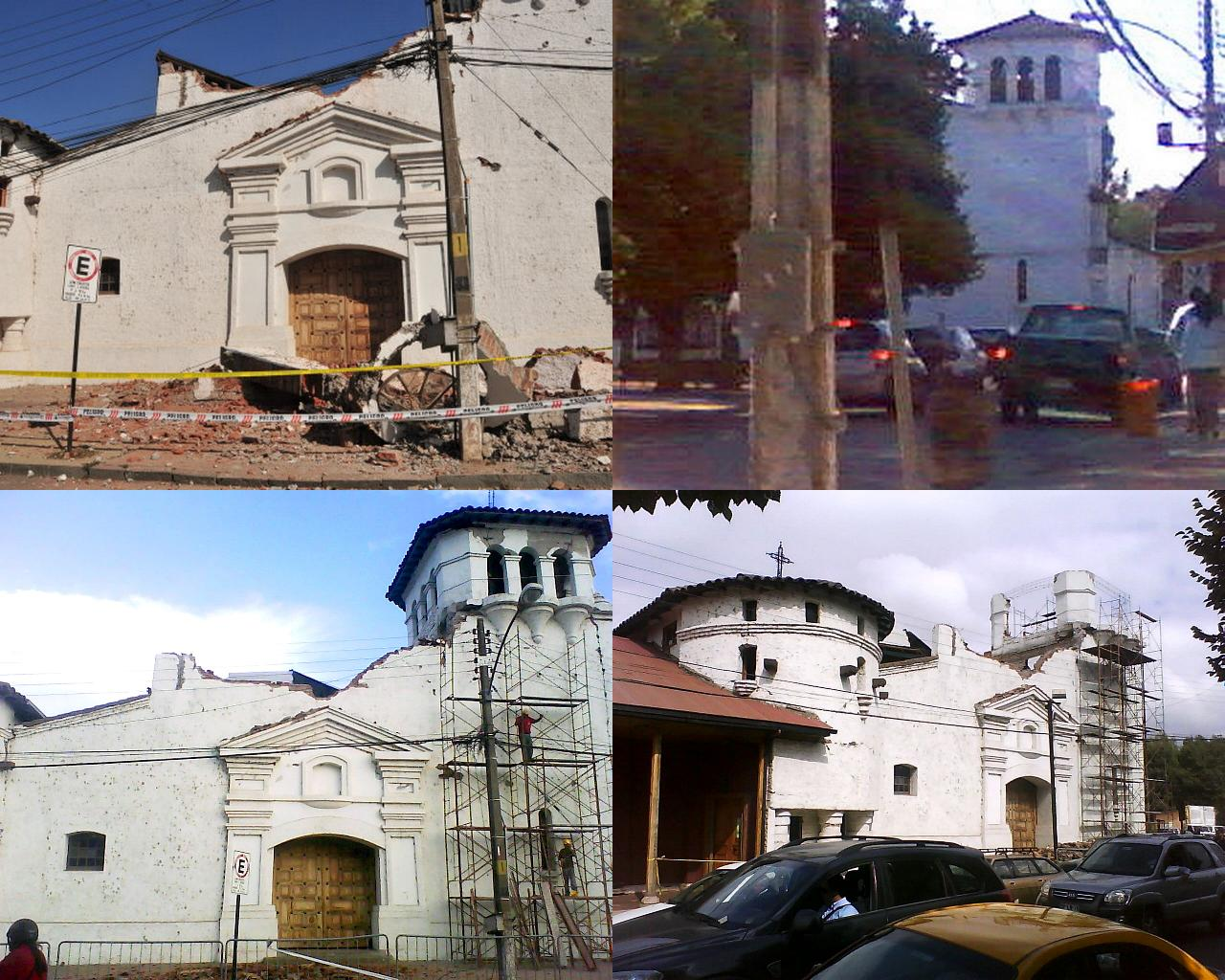
Church of Santa Cruz after 2010 Chile earthquake

The Church of Santa Cruz is a church located in Santa Cruz, Chile, 28 Pl. de Armas. It was damaged during the 2010 Chile earthquake.
