= Rebeca Cofré =

Chilean politician

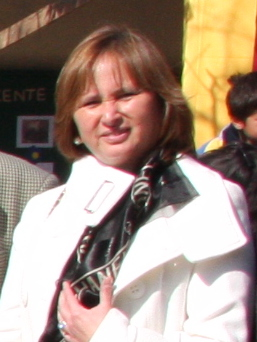
- Cofré in May 2010

Intendant of the O'Higgins Region
- In office 20 April 2020 – 13 February 2021
- President: Sebastián Piñera
- Preceded by: Juan Manuel Masferrer
- Succeeded by: Ricardo Guzmán

Mayor of Chépica
- In office 6 December 2008 – 20 April 2020
- Preceded by: Miriam del Carmen Rodríguez Cruz
- Succeeded by: Patricio Cepeda

Personal details
- Born: Rebeca del Rosario Cofré Calderón; 23 August 1962 (age 63) Providencia, Santiago, Chile
- Party: Independent Democrat Union
- Spouse: Sergio Schlack Harnecker (2002–present)
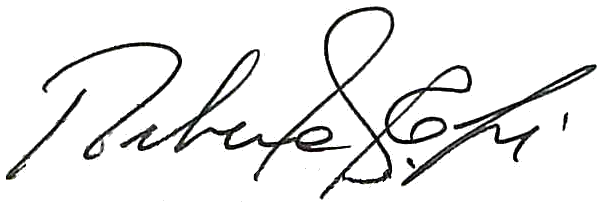
- Signature
- Website: Facebook profile

Rebeca del Rosario Cofré Calderón (born 23 August 1962) is a Chilean politician and member of the Independent Democrat Union (UDI). In 2008 she was elected mayor of Chépica, a small commune in Colchagua Province, after running unsuccessfully for the same office four years before. She was re-elected to the office in 2012. In 2013, she was named as one of the 100 Leading Women of Chile by Mujeres Empresarias (Note: Mujeres Empresarias (Business Women) defines itself as a "network of Chilean [women] leaders", an "organisation which supports the business administration by women".) and the Economía y Negocios (Economy and Business) section of El Mercurio newspaper.

== Biography ==
=== Early life ===
Rebeca Cofré Calderón was born on 23 August 1962, to Luis Antonio Cofré Farías and Rebeca de las Nieves Calderón Segovia, in Providencia, a district (comuna) of Santiago. In the 1970s Cofré's family moved to Pichilemu, then in Colchagua Province, where she attended the Escuela Doctor Díaz Lira (currently the Colegio de la Preciosa Sangre) with her sisters Francisca Javiera and Carolina de las Nieves. She attended high school at the Liceo C-25 (currently the Liceo Agustín Ross Edwards), with her class being the first to graduate from the school.

Cofré married in second nuptials Sergio Gustavo Reinaldo Schlack Harnecker (born 13 February 1928), on 16 February 2002, in Nancagua, Colchagua Province. The couple has resided in Chépica, a city south of Nancagua, ever since. She has three children.

=== Political career ===
According to her biography on the Chépica government website, Cofré decided to start her political career in 2000 because of her "great motivation for the protection of the people's dignity, mostly of the working women". (Note: Original Spanish quote: "gran motivación por la salvaguarda de la dignidad de las personas; particularmente de la mujer trabajadora".) Pichilemu News, an online newspaper from Pichilemu, states that she "emulated" her husband, farmer Sergio Schlack, who was a National Renewal regional adviser representing Cardenal Caro Province in the 1990s.

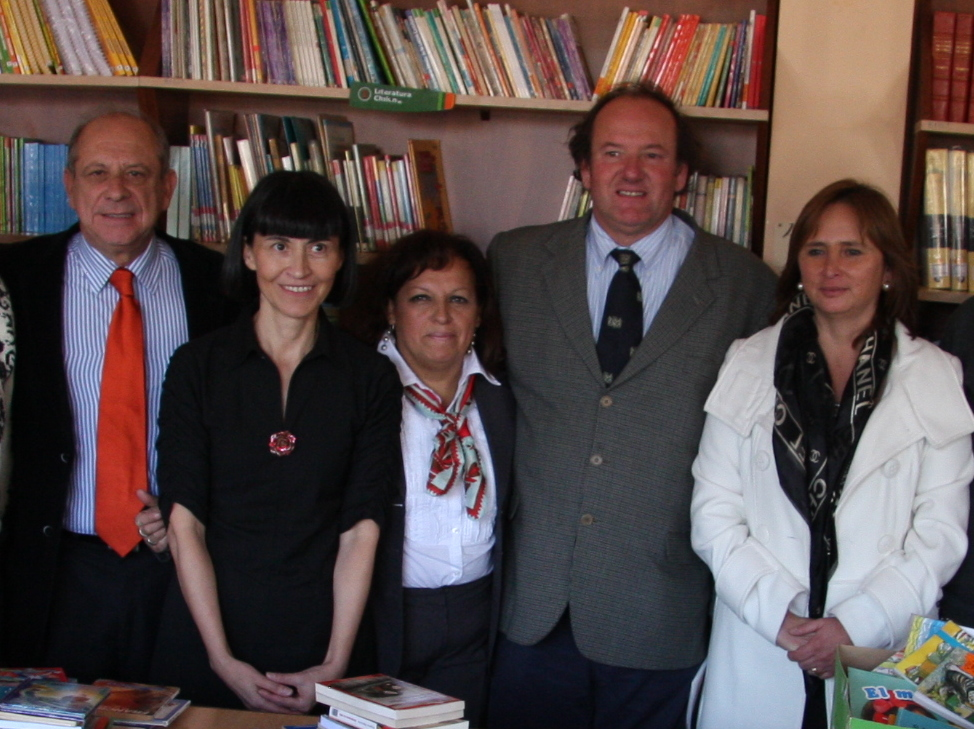
From left to right: deputy Juan Carlos Latorre, officials from the Library of the National Congress of Chile, deputy Ramón Barros Montero, and Cofré during a ceremony at a local school, May 2010.

As a member of right-wing party Independent Democrat Union (UDI), she ran as a candidate for mayor of Chépica in 2004, competing against four other candidates: Leonel Arturo Padilla Peña (Humanist Party, PH), Raúl Araya Donoso (independent), Gastón Retamales Fuenzalida (independent), and Miriam del Carmen Rodríguez Cruz (Socialist Party, PS). Rodríguez Cruz won the election, garnering 3,546 votes (47.01%) out of 7,543 votes cast. Cofré, in contrast, obtained 3,260 votes (43.22%). Cofré ran again as a candidate for mayor of Chépica in 2008, obtaining 4,931 votes (62.71%) out of 7,863, winning against incumbent mayor Rodríguez Cruz, who obtained 2,932 votes (37.29%). Cofré took office as mayor of Chépica on 6 December 2008.

A 27 February 2010 earthquake destroyed most of the historic centre of Chépica. Among the destroyed buildings were the local church, the Fundación las Rosas (Las Rosas Foundation) house, the firefighters' headquarters, and small shops, which according to Cofré were close to 200 years old. The local council was forced to hold meetings at an indoor court. Cofré aimed to recover "whatever it [was] possible".

In November 2010, the municipality conducted a festival, for the first time, named the Festival de la Esquila, which consisted of sheep shearing, Chilean typical games, a craft, gastronomic and cultural fair, and the performances of Potro Bretón de Montaña and the Sonora Juventud from Peumo. On the following year, in July, Cofré announced the creation of a commerce promotion office, after a meeting with local businessmen and government authorities.

Cofré ran for re-election as mayor of Chépica in the 2012 election, running against Miriam del Carmen Rodríguez Cruz, from the Socialist Party, and Antonio Cerpa Plaza, an independent supported by the Humanist Party. Cofré won the election, obtaining 4,483 votes (55.9%) to Rodríguez Cruz's 3,161 votes (39.4%) and Cerpa Plaza's 379 votes (4.7%).

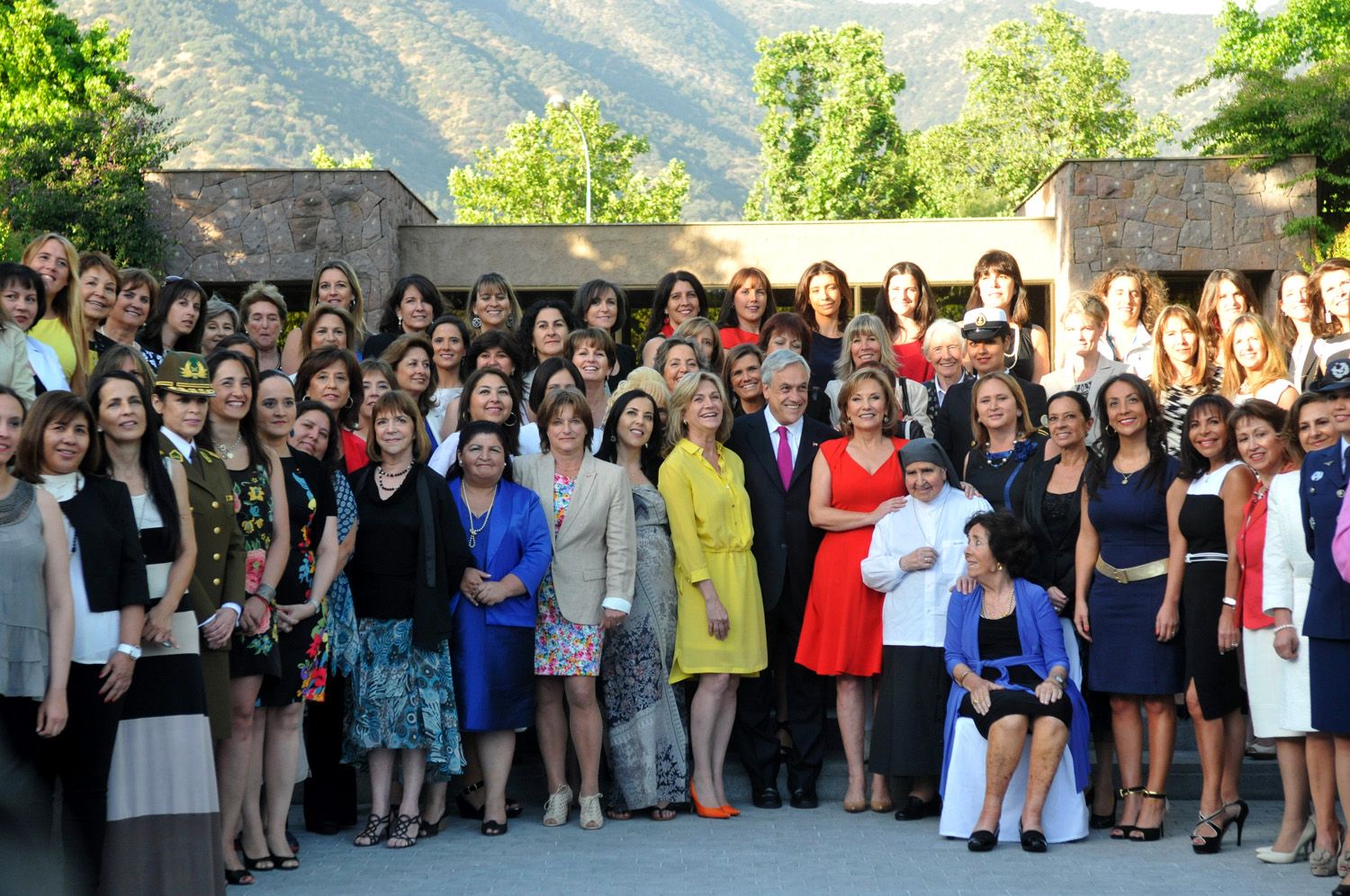
Rebeca Cofré was named one of the 100 Leading Women of Chile in November 2013.

In January 2013, it was announced by Cofré and the local priest Claudio Fuenzalida that the San Antonio de Padua church, badly damaged by the 2010 earthquake, would be re-constructed. Later that year, in November 2013, Cofré was named as one of the 100 Mujeres Líderes de Chile (100 Leading Women of Chile) by Mujeres Empresarias and the Economía y Negocios (Economy and Business) section of the El Mercurio newspaper. She accepted the award at the newspapers' headquarters in Vitacura on 26 November 2013, in a ceremony attended by personalities such as President Sebastián Piñera Echenique and First Lady Cecilia Morel Montes, who was also named one of the 100 Leading Women of Chile.

In 2020, the President of Chile, Sebastián Piñera, appointed her as Intendant of the O'Higgins Region, replacing Juan Manuel Masferrer.
