= Paty Cofré =

Chilean comedian

- Born: 4 March 1939; Freire, Chile
- Occupation(s): Comedian and actress
- Children: 1
- Parent: Elena Cofré

Patricia Umerinda Cofré (4 March 1939) is a Chilean humorist, comedian and former vedette.

== Career ==
=== Beginnings ===
From the age of 16, Cofré worked as a vedette in some revues and theaters in Santiago, such as Bim Bam Bum. In that revue, she began to participate in humorous sketches that gave way to a career as a comedian. In 1962, she replaced Bim Bam Bum star Iris del Valle, who was on medical leave. Del Valle, furious with the success Cofré had achieved, assaulted her during a show, an altercation that made it to the front page of the newspaper La Tercera, and subsequently demanded her departure from the revue.

=== Film and television ===
She made her debut on television in Sábado gigante on Canal 13 in the late 1980s, as part of the program's sketches. In 1989, she acted alongside comedians such as Jorge Franco and Guillermo Bruce in the film El cartero chifla dos veces (The mailman whistles twice), as the mailman's wife. After a brief stint at TVN, she returned to Canal 13, where she participated in the programs Éxito and Venga conmigo.

In 2002, she joined the comedy program Morandé con compañía, where she participated in several sketches with her former colleagues from the revues, such as Daniel Vilches. One of her most remembered roles is that of the "15 seconds", where in that amount of time, she insults everyone in the scene, including her fellow cast members, the presenters, and even the audience, all of which is censored for the viewers with music. This role has also been done in different program sketches, such as la Sra. Jueza, la Criticadora de Espectáculos, La Escuelita, La Dama del Tiempo, El Horóscopo con Paty Cofré, and Gato encerrado (parody of Caso cerrado), among others.

She has appeared in the films Che Kopete, the movie (2007) and Heroes (2014).

== Personal life ==
In May 2021, in an interview given on Martín Cárcamo's program De tú a tú, she revealed that she had been a victim of domestic violence by her ex-husband while she was pregnant with their only child.
