= Liceo Santa Cruz =

Santa Cruz High School Liceo Santa Cruz
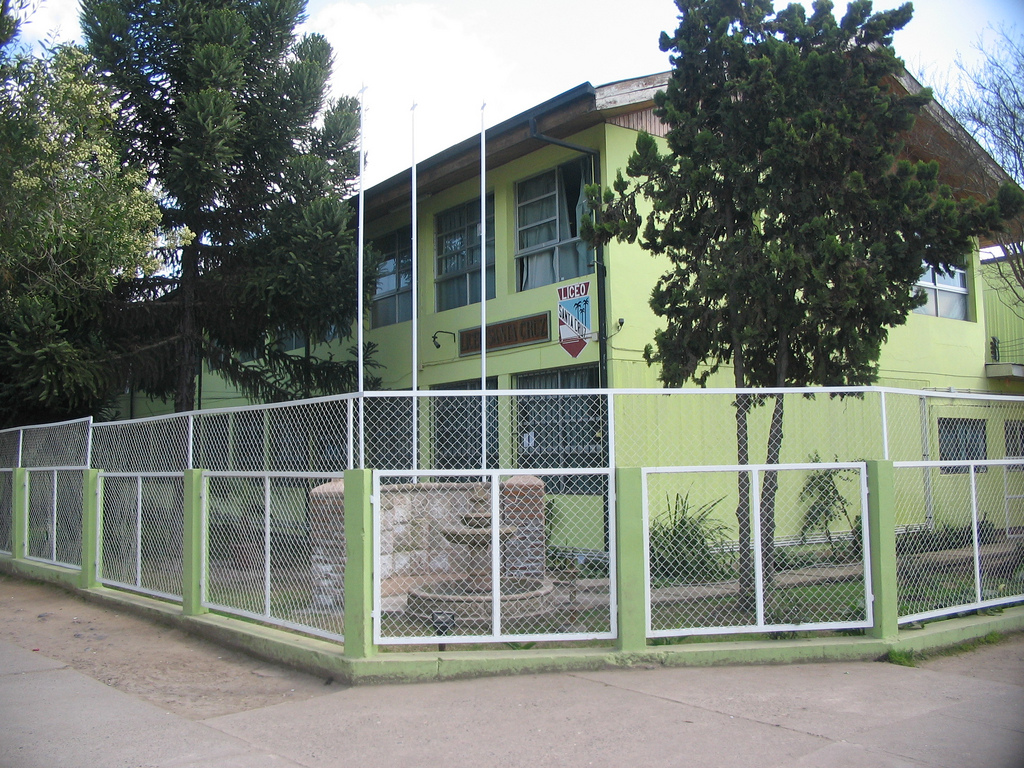
- Santa Cruz, Chile

Information
- Type: Public Secondary
- Established: August 2, 1963
- Principal: Francisco Campos
- Enrollment: 1000+
- Website: Liceo Santa Cruz (Internet Archive)

Santa Cruz High School or Liceo Santa Cruz is a Chilean public high school located in Santa Cruz, Chile.

== History ==
The school was created as the Santa Cruz High School of Men on August 2, 1963, after a proposal by the local Rotary Club and the Department of Santa Cruz Governor Carlos Cardoen Decoene. Adriano Díaz donated some land, but a sports complex was constructed there instead.

Classes commenced on March 1, 1964, in an old house in Nicolás Palacios Street, with around 170 students in four classes. Many of the students had already completed their first or second grade humanities courses at the Pedro Aguirre Cerda High School, but their work was not officially recognized.

The first principal was Osvaldo Castillo, who contracted teachers, and almost all of whom had worked at Pedro Aguirre Cerda High School.

The logo and standard both include palm trees, which are characteristic of the city. The anthem was composed by Raúl Benavides.
