= Educarchile =

educarchile

- Screenshot of www.educarchile.cl on 12 August 2012
- Website type: Educational
- Available in: Spanish
- Owners: Ministerio de Educación de Chile and Fundación Chile
- Website: www.educarchile.cl
- Commercial: No
- Registration: Optional
- Launched: 2001; 25 years ago
- Current status: Online

educarchile is a Chilean educational website owned by the Ministry of Education of Chile and Fundación Chile. educarchile was created in 2001, using as a basis two different projects from the Ministry of Education and Fundación Chile, and its purpose is "to be the great Internet educative center for teachers, students, families and education researchers."
