= Liceo Bicentenario Óscar Castro Zúñiga =

Coordinates: 34.1710°S 70.7378°W

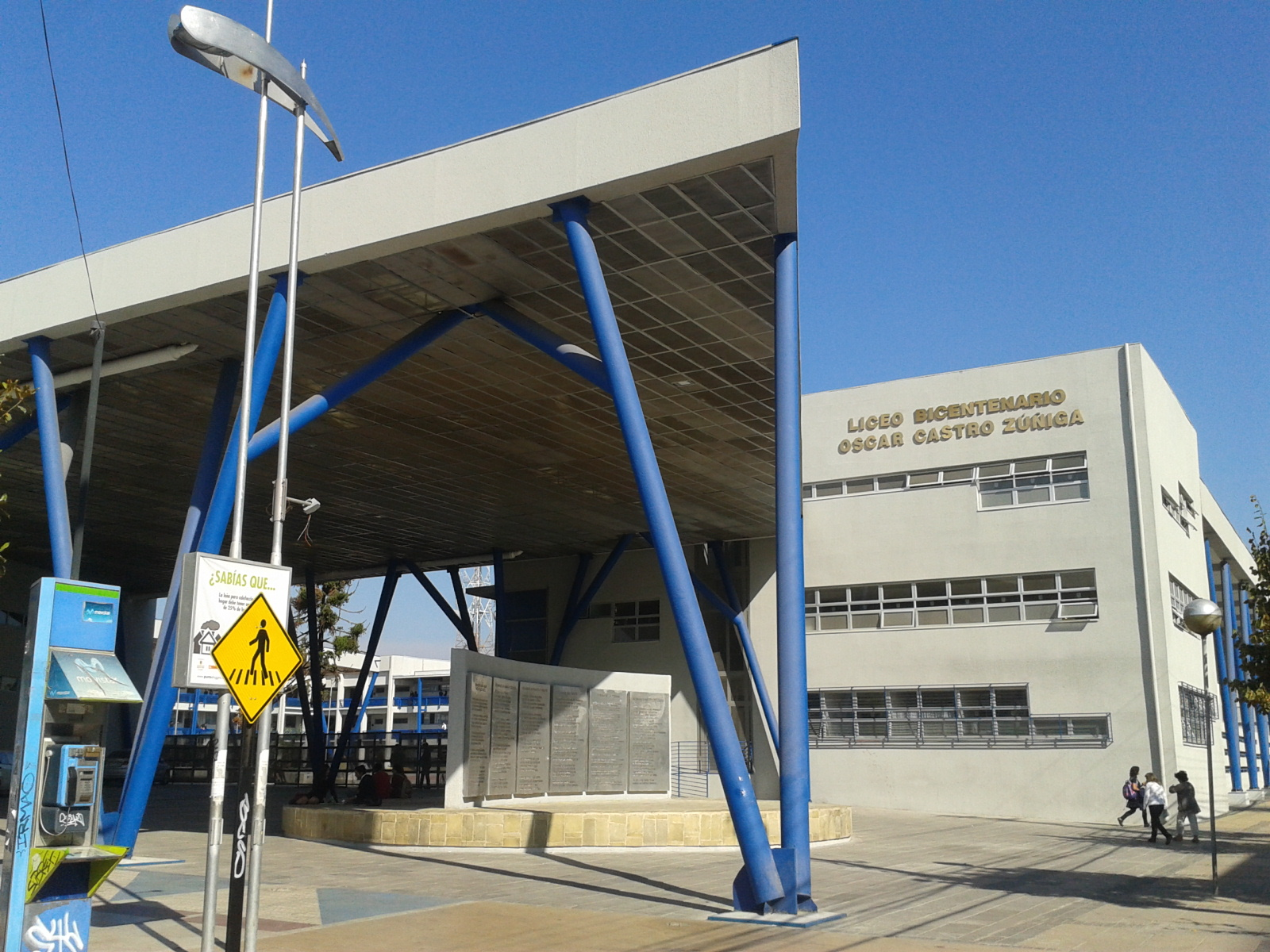
- Liceo Bicentenario Óscar Castro Zúñiga in 2014 Liceo Bicentenario Óscar Castro Zúñiga in 2014
- Rancagua, Chile

Information
- Type: High school
- Established: 29 July 1846

Liceo Bicentenario Óscar Castro Zúñiga (English: Bicentenario Óscar Castro Zúñiga High School) is a Chilean high school located in Rancagua, Cachapoal Province, Chile.

== Notable alumni ==
- Buddy Richard, singer;
- Óscar Hahn, writer and poet;
