= Presidential provincial delegate of Cardenal Caro =

- Logo (2021-present) Logo of the former governor (2010-2021)
- Incumbent; Patricio Arenas Román since 13 March 2026
- Style: No courtesy, title or style
- Appointer: President of Chile
- Precursor: Governor of Cardenal Caro Department
- Formation: 1979 (Provincial Delegate); 11 March 1981 (Governor); 14 July 2021 (Presidential Provincial Delegate)
- First holder: Marcelo Nogueira Hidalgo (Provincial Delegate, 1979-1981; Governor of Cardenal Caro, 1981-1990); Carlos Ortega Bahamondes (Presidential Provincial Delegate of Cardenal Caro, 2021-2022)
- Final holder: Carlos Ortega Bahamondes (Governor of Cardenal Caro, 2018-2021)
- Abolished: 11 March 1981 (Provincial Delegate of Cardenal Caro); 14 July 2021 (Governor of Cardenal Caro)
- Salary: CLP3,578,457 (as of June 2023)
- Website: dppcardenalcaro.dpp.gob.cl

The presidential provincial delegate of Cardenal Caro, formerly the governor of Cardenal Caro is the appointed head of government of the provincial government in Cardenal Caro Province, Chile. The delegate is designated by the president.

The first governor of Cardenal Caro Province was Marcelo Nogueira Hidalgo, appointed by dictator Augusto Pinochet Ugarte, and the last was Carlos Ortega Bahamondes, who was appointed on March 11, 2018 by President Sebastián Piñera Echenique. The post was replaced by the delegate of Cardenal Caro Province in 2021, with Ortega confirmed by President Piñera.

== History ==
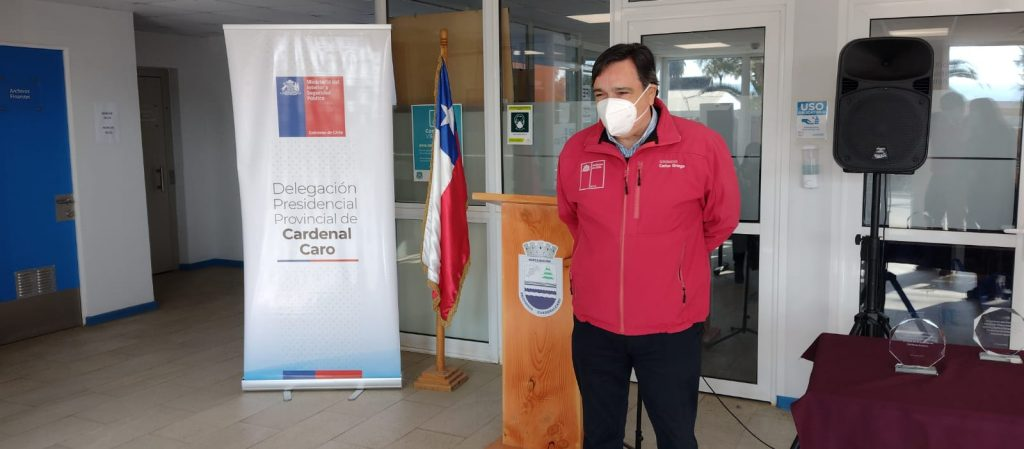
Governor Carlos Ortega Bahamondes on the first day of the new post as presidential provincial delegate of Cardenal Caro, 14 July 2021

The history of the province began when, on July 13, 1973, President Salvador Allende decreed the creation of the Cardenal Caro Department, which would become a province on October 3, 1979, as General Augusto Pinochet decreed its creation under the name of Cardenal Caro (Cardinal Caro), in honour of José María Caro Rodríguez, the first Roman Catholic Church Cardinal, who was born in Ciruelos near the province's capital city, Pichilemu. The communes of Litueche (formerly El Rosario), La Estrella, Marchihue, Paredones, and Pichilemu, originally from Colchagua Province; and Navidad, originally from San Antonio Province, formed the province. The first governor of Cardenal Caro was Marcelo Nogueira Hidalgo, who held the office from 1979 until 1990.

In 2021, a new regionalization law was enacted and the former post of governor of Cardenal Caro province was replaced by the presidential provincial delegate of Cardenal Caro. Then governor Carlos Ortega Bahamondes, originally appointed in 2018, was confirmed as presidential provincial delegate by president Sebastián Piñera on 14 July 2021.

== List of governors ==
#	Name	Took office	Left office
1	Marcelo Nogueira Hidalgo	1979	1990
2	Hernán Vieira Herrera	1990	1994
3	Rolando Cárdenas Ibarra	1994	2000
4	Cristián Oyarzún Estay	2000	2002
5	José Saúl Bravo Gallegos	2002	2004
6	Fabricio Jiménez Mardones	2004	2006
7	Hernán San Martín Valdés	2006	2007
8	Loreto Puebla Muñoz	2009	11 March 2010
9	Julio Diego Ibarra Maldonado	16 March 2010	12 March 2014
10	Teresa Núñez Cornejo	12 March 2014	11 March 2018
11	Carlos Ortega Bahamondes	11 March 2018	14 July 2021

== List of presidential provincial delegates ==
#	Name	Took office	Left office
1	Carlos Ortega Bahamondes	14 July 2021	11 March 2022
2	Carlos Cisterna Pavez	11 March 2022	26 October 2023
3	Josefina Toro Rodríguez	1 December 2023	11 March 2026
4	Patricio Arenas Román	13 March 2026	Incumbent
