= Instituto Regional Federico Errázuriz =

Instituto Regional Federico Errázuriz Instituto Regional Federico Errázuriz (IRFE)
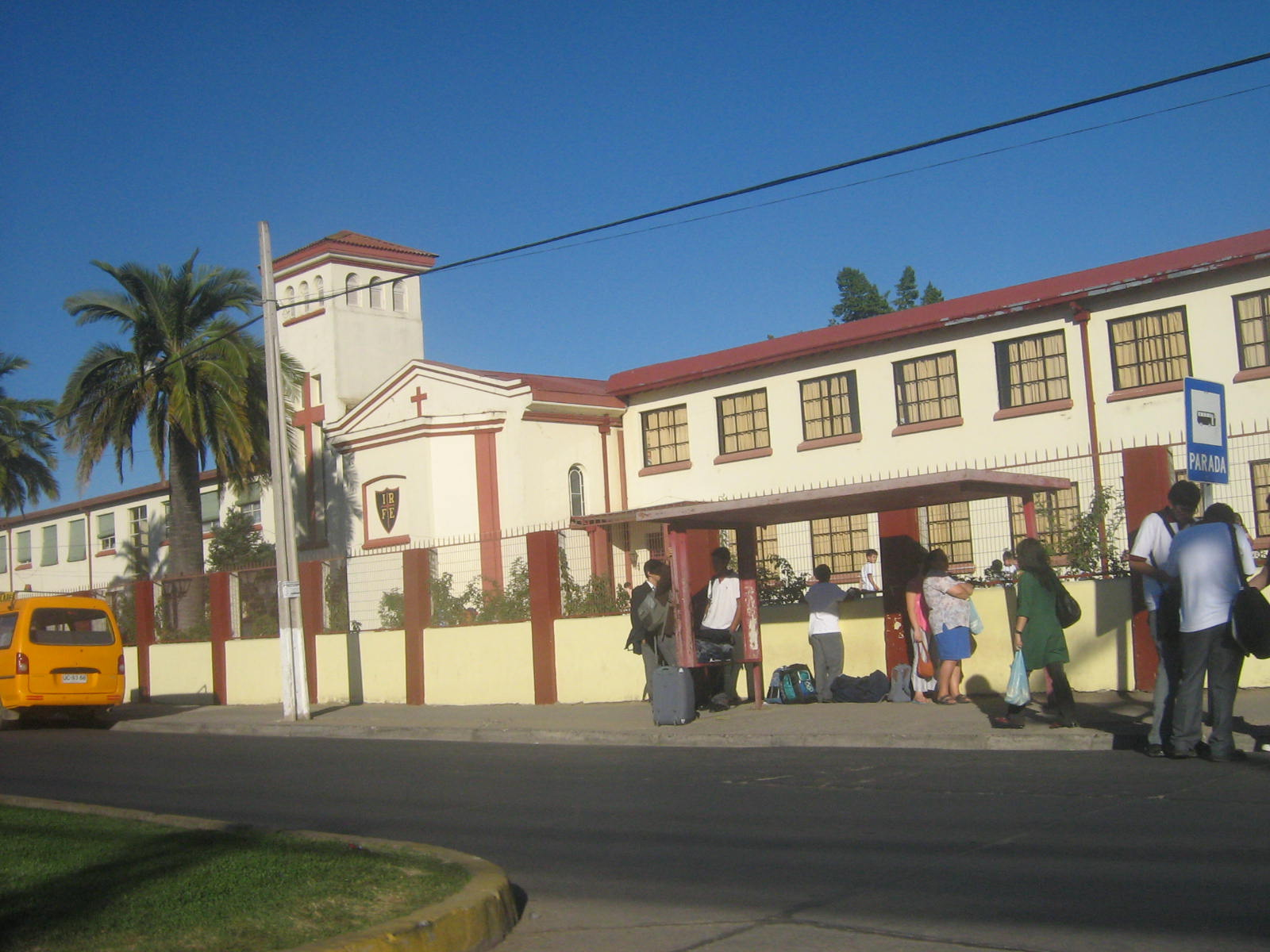
- IRFE in March 2007.

Location
- Avenida Errázuriz 670, Santa Cruz, Chile; Santa Cruz; Chile; 34°38′11.84″S 71°21′30.66″W

Information
- Type: Primary and secondary
- Motto: "Dios y Patria" (English: God and Motherland)
- Established: 1940 (81 years ago)
- Rector: Cristián Molina Mera
- Enrollment: 1,744
- Color
- Website: www.irfe.cl (in Spanish)

Instituto Regional Federico Errázuriz (Federico Errázuriz Regional Institute, in Spanish), also known as President Errázuriz Regional Institute or I.R.F.E., is a primary and secondary school in Santa Cruz, O'Higgins Region, Chile.

It was founded in 1940 by Carlos Errázuriz Mena, member of the Chilean Christian Board. It is named after the former Presidents of Chile Federico Errázuriz Zañartu, and Federico Errázuriz Echaurren. The current Principal of IRFE is Cristián Molina, who was preceded by Oscar Patricio Reyes González (2006-2017).

Federico Errázuriz Regional Institute was ranked as the sixteenth "best school in O'Higgins Region" by Federico Santa María Technical University, in 2009. It is only surpassed in Santa Cruz by Colegio Santa Cruz de Unco, which is ranked sixth.

== History ==
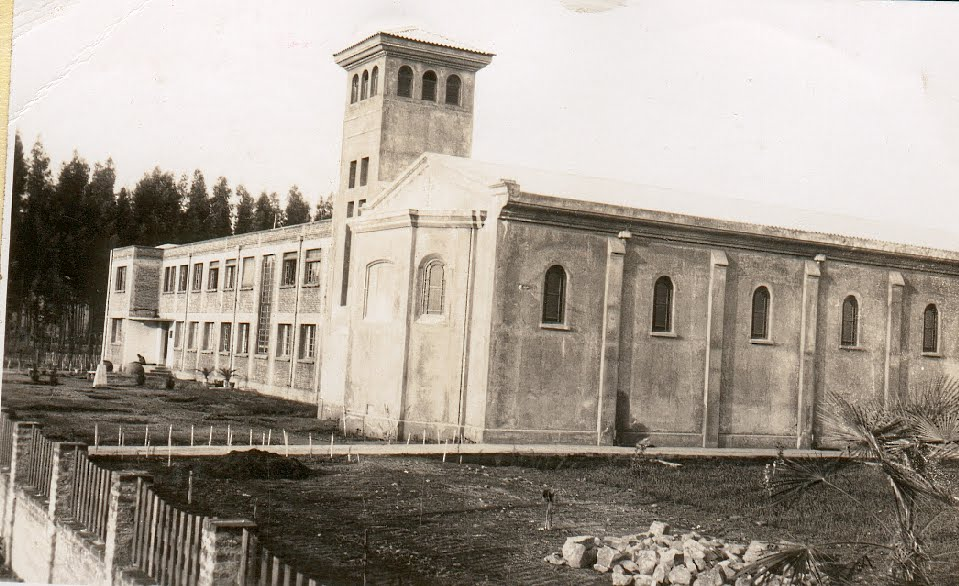
Façade of the Instituto Regional Federico Errázuriz in the 1940s.

The Instituto Regional Federico Errázuriz was founded in 1940 by Carlos Errázuriz Mena, a member of the Chilean Christian Center Foundation (Spanish: Fundación Centro Cristiano), as Instituto Regional Presidente Errázuriz (Spanish: President Errázuriz Regional Institute). Its foundation is often attributed only to the Foundation. The institute's first Principal was Father José Kuhl, a Pallottine priest from Limburg, Germany, who also wrote the institute's anthem.

The Pallotines left Chile in 1968, and control of the institute was given back to the Christian Center Foundation. The Bishop of Talca appointed Presbyter Octavio Godoy Reyes as Principal in 1968. He held the job until 1980, when he died. Monsignor Luis Daza Osorio then became Principal, succeeded in 2006 by Oscar Patricio Reyes González, who held the position until 2017. The current principal is Cristian Molina Mera.

== Notable alumni ==
- Wladimir Román Miquel — Lawyer and politician, intendant of the O'Higgins Region from November 2012 to March 2014.
- Francisco Acuña — Comedian, known for playing "Toto" at "Morandé con Compañía" TV show.
- Juan Pablo González — Gymnast, specialized in vault and floor exercises.
