= SEP law =

The SEP law (Spanish: Ley SEP, Subvención Escolar Preferencial) is a Chilean law which lets the State to devote additional monetary resources to primary and secondary schools for them to improve the educational conditions.
