= Institute of Public Affairs of the University of Chile =

Public administration school of the University of Chile

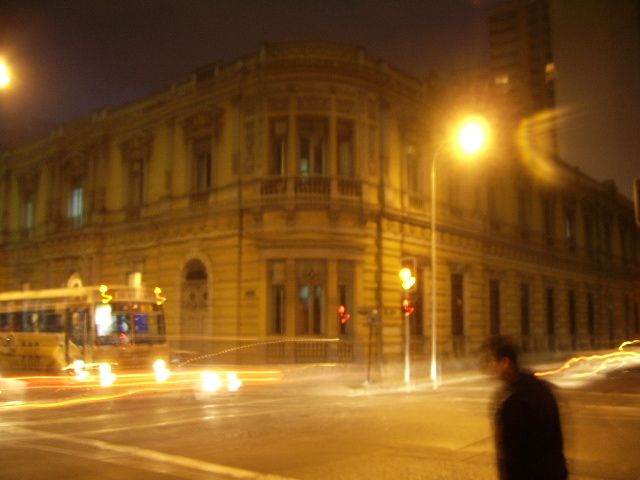
Palacio Matte hosted the Institute of Public Affairs of the University of Chile until the 2010 earthquake destroyed most of the structure.

The Institute of Public Affairs of the University of Chile (Spanish: Instituto de Asuntos Públicos de la Universidad de Chile) is a multidisciplinary institute, created on 13 November 2001, after three University of Chile units were merged: the Centre of Analysis of Public Politics (Spanish: Centro de Análisis de Políticas Públicas), the Institute of Political Science (Spanish: Instituto de Ciencia Política), and the School of Government, Public Management and Political Science (Spanish: Escuela de Gobierno, Gestión Pública y Ciencia Política).

In addition to being a centre for Chilean public policy research, the Institute contains an undergraduate program in Public Administration (through the School of Government and Public Management) and two graduate programs: a Master's in Political Science, and a Master's in Government and Public Management.

The Institute's faculty offices and graduate school are located in the Santa Lucia neighborhood of downtown Santiago, and its School of Government and Public Management is located in the Brasil neighborhood, in a building purchased from the now-defunct ARCIS University.
