= Teresa Núñez Cornejo =

Chilean public administrator and politician

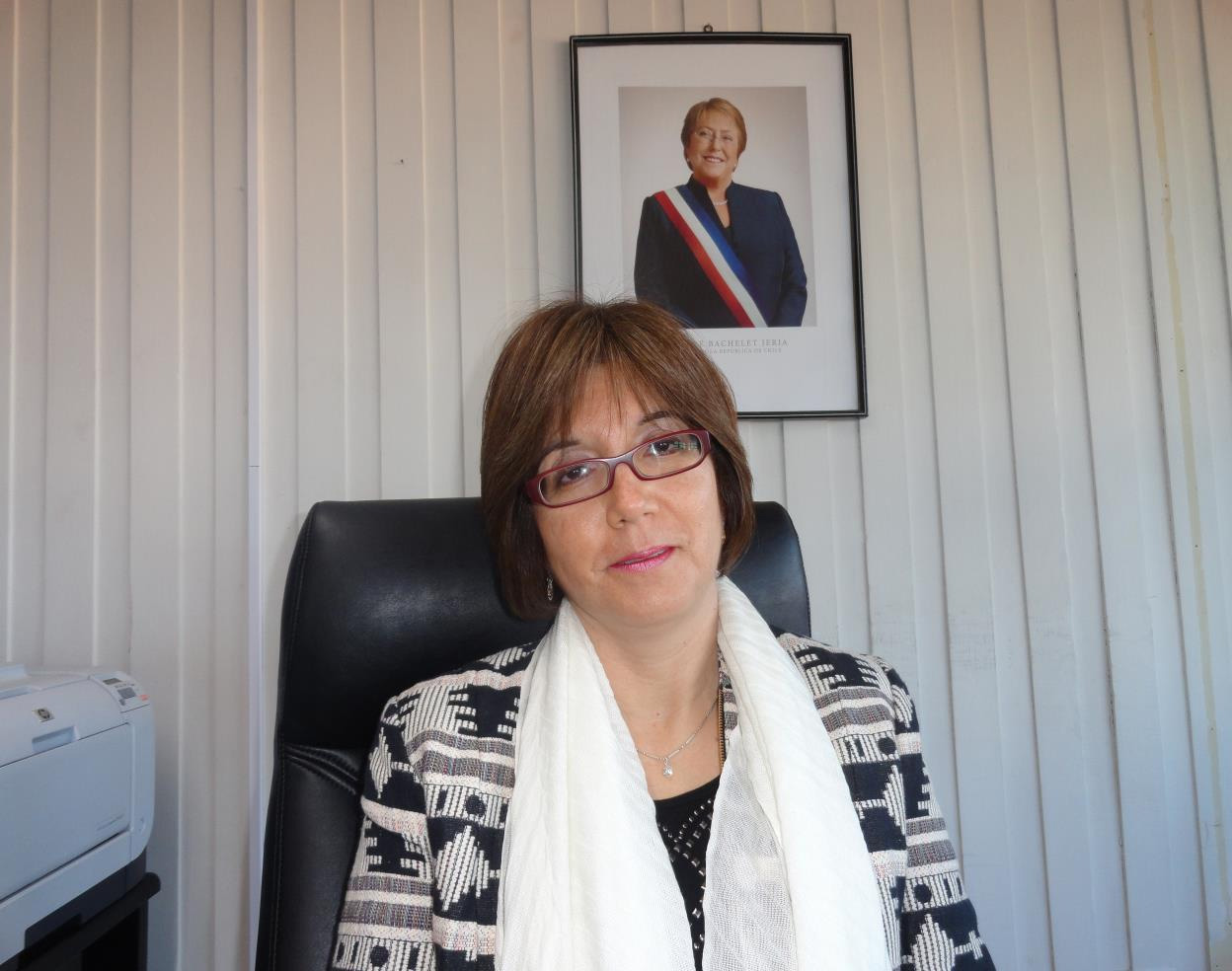

10th Governor of Cardenal Caro Province
- In office 11 March 2014 – 11 March 2018
- President: Michelle Bachelet Jeria
- Preceded by: Julio Ibarra Maldonado
- Succeeded by: Carlos Ortega Bahamondes

Councillor of Peumo
- In office 2000–2004

Personal details
- Born: September 10, 1965 (age 61) Rancagua, Chile
- Party: Socialist Party of Chile (PS)
- Spouse: Emilio Ramírez Cáceres
- Education: Academy of Christian Humanism University
- Occupation: Public administrator
- Website: Núñez at the Government of Cardenal Caro Province website

Teresa Mercedes del Carmen Núñez Cornejo (born 10 September 1965) is a Chilean public administrator and politician. Núñez was the Governor of Cardenal Caro Province from 2014 to 2018.

== Biography ==
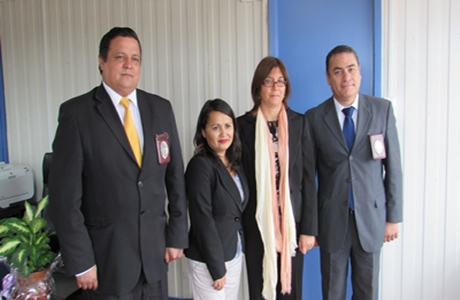
Núñez is visited by PDI officials, in 2014.

Núñez was born in Rancagua, on 10 September 1965; the daughter of Luis Enrique Núñez Baeza and Lucy Mercedes Cornejo Barahona. She married in that same city, with Emilio José Ramírez Cáceres, on 6 January 1990.

She is an engineer in public administration, of the Academy of Christian Humanism University. Teresa Núñez has worked in the social area of several municipalities in the O'Higgins Region, and has been in charge of programmes created by public organisations like Fosis, and in NGOs related to women and families.

She was the provincial director of Prodemu, in Cachapoal Province; provincial director of Integra Foundation in Colchagua Province; councilor of the commune of Peumo between 2000 and 2004.

On 11 March 2014, President Michelle Bachelet appointed Núñez as the governor of Cardenal Caro Province, succeeding Julio Ibarra Maldonado.
