= Isla de Yáquil =

Coordinates: 34°38′S 71°11′W

- Village
- Isla de Yáquil
- Interactive map of Isla de Yáquil
- Country: Chile
- Region: (O'Higgins Region) Libertador General Bernardo O'Higgins
- Province: (Colchagua Province) Colchagua
- Commune: Santa Cruz

Isla de Yáquil (Spanish for Island of Yáquil; also known as La Isla) is a Chilean town located in Santa Cruz, Colchagua Province, Libertador General Bernardo O'Higgins Region.

In 1899 it was described in Francisco Solano Astaburuaga y Cienfuegos' Diccionario Geográfico de la República de Chile as "a location of the northern section of the Curicó Department located in some hills of the same name, north of the village of Santa Cruz and Quinchañihue".

== Notable residents ==
- Juan José Cañete (d. 1896)
- Sergio Espejo, Chilean deputy and Minister of Transport during the first Government of Michelle Bachelet
