= San Fernando College =

Location
- Central House; 1012 Valdivia; San Fernando 3071507 Technical-Vocational School; 1174 Olegario Lazo; San Fernando 3071253; Chile
- Coordinates: 34°34′55″S 70°59′14″W

Information
- Type: High school
- Motto: Construyendo en Valores (Building Values)
- Established: March 28, 1984
- School code: 2454 (RBD)
- Principal: Antonio Rojas Heinz and Maria Belen Cofre (Olegario Lazo Campus)
- Faculty: 56 FTEs
- Enrollment: 1,468 (as of 2017-18)
- Student to teacher ratio: 26.2:1
- Color(s): Gold and blue
- Sports: Basketball, Rhythmic Gymnastics, Soccer, Tennis, Volleyball
- Nickname: SFC, College
- Website: www.sanfernandocollege.cl

San Fernando College is a Chilean high school located in San Fernando, Colchagua Province, Chile.

== Gallery ==
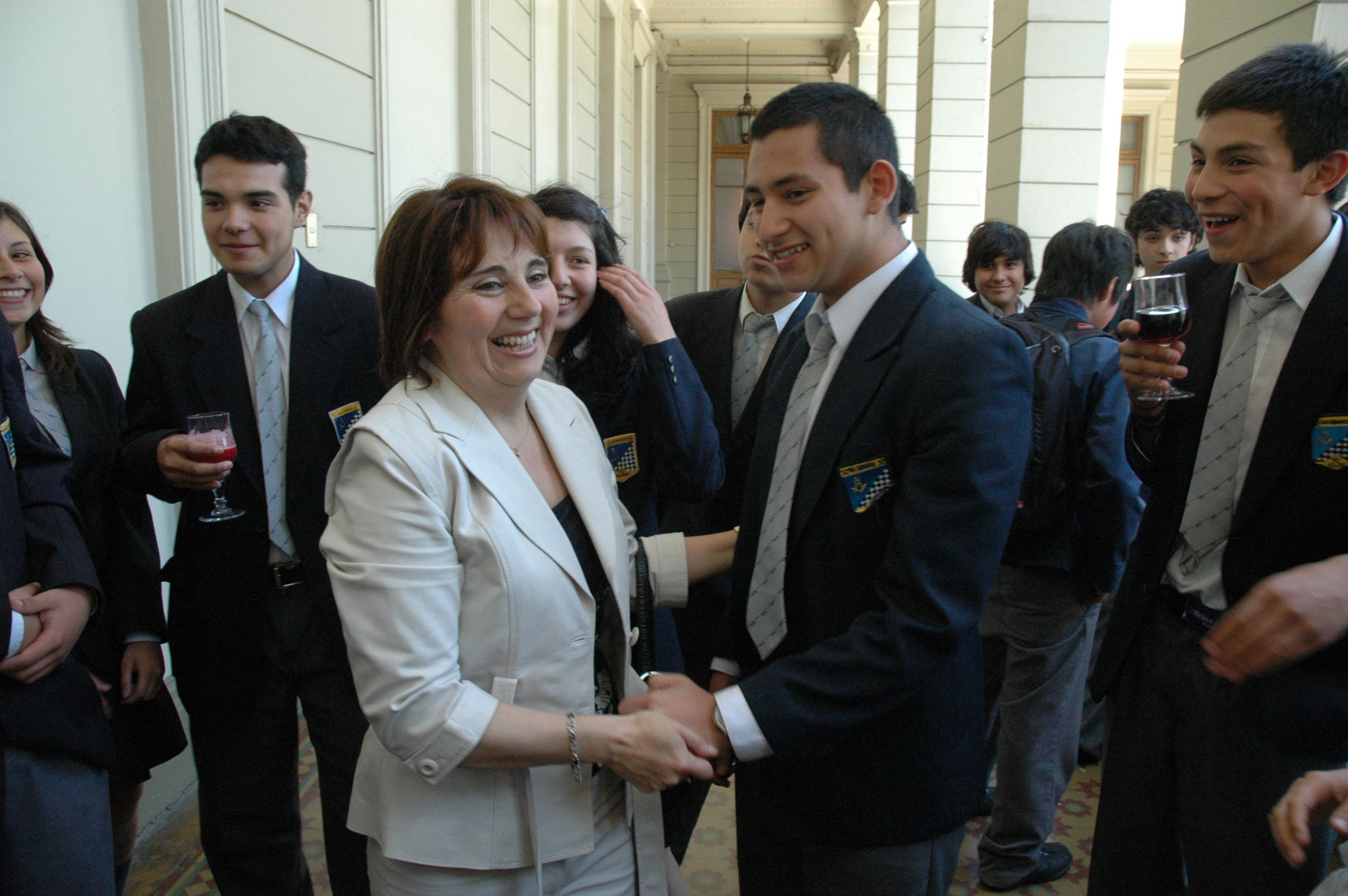
San Fernando College chemistry teacher Náyade Fuentes with her students at the Pontifical Catholic University of Chile, in 2008
