= Chépica =

- Town and Commune
- Map of the Chépica commune in O'Higgins Region Location in Chile
- Coordinates (town): 34°44′S 71°17′W
- Country: Chile
- Region: (O'Higgins Region) O'Higgins
- Province: (Colchagua Province) Colchagua

Government
  - Type: Municipality
  - Alcalde: Fabián Soto

Area
  - Total: 503.4 km^{2} (194.4 sq mi)
- Elevation: 182 m (597 ft)

Population (2012 Census)
  - Total: 14,425
  - Density: 28.66/km^{2} (74.22/sq mi)
  - Urban: 6,949
  - Rural: 6,908

Sex
  - Men: 7,100
  - Women: 6,757
- Time zone: UTC-4 (CLT)
  - Summer (DST): UTC-3 (CLST)
- Area code: country 56 + city 72
- Website: www.municipalidadchepica.cl

Chépica is a Chilean town and commune in Colchagua Province, O'Higgins Region.

== Demographics ==
According to the 2002 census of the National Statistics Institute, Chépica spans an area of 503.4 km^{2} (194 sq mi) and has 13,857 inhabitants (7,100 men and 6,757 women). Of these, 6,949 (50.1%) lived in urban areas and 6,908 (49.9%) in rural areas. The population fell by 1.7% (244 persons) between the 1992 and 2002 censuses.

== Administration ==
As a commune, Chépica is a third-level administrative division of Chile administered by a municipal council, headed by an alcalde who is directly elected every four years. The 2021-24 alcalde is Fabián Soto.
