= Prueba de Selección Universitaria =

Public university admission test in Chile

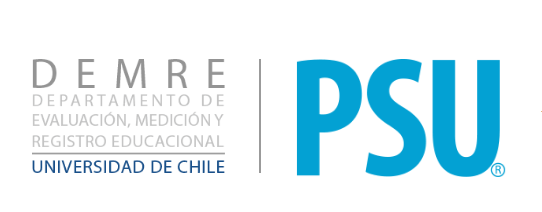
- Acronym: PSU
- Type: Paper-based standardized test
- Administrator: CRUCH, Ministry of Education (Chile)
- Skills tested: Reading Comprehension, Mathematics, Chemistry, Biology, Physics, and History
- Purpose: Admission to Universities
- Year started: 2003
- Year terminated: 2020
- Duration: Spanish / History: 2:30 hours Mathematics: 2:20 hours Science: 2:40 hours
- Score range: 150 - 850
- Offered: Once a year
- Regions: Chile
- Languages: Spanish
- Prerequisites: Complete High School
- Fee: CLP$32.700 US$42.00
- Used by: Universities and Students
- Website: demre.cl

The University Selection Test (Spanish: Prueba de Selección Universitaria or PSU) was a standardized test used for college admissions in Chile, made by the Department of Evaluation, Measurement and Educational Register (Departamento de Evaluación, Medición y Registro Educacional or DEMRE) by mandate of the Board of Chilean Universities' Headmasters (Consejo de Rectores de las Universidades Chilenas, or CRUCH). Since 2003, it had replaced the Prueba de Aptitud Académica (PAA) which had been in use since 1966, until its eventual termination in 2020. A temporary test (Prueba de Transición) was used while the Prueba de Admisión a la Educación Superior (PAES) was in development.

The PSU was given once a year, usually between November and December. It was necessary to take the test to apply to universities ascribed to the CRUCH, known as Traditional Universities. The only requirement to take this test was to have completed high school.

== Format ==
The PSU itself was a set of four separate tests, which were taken in two days. Out of these four:

- Two were required (Reading Comprehension and Mathematics)
- Two were optional, yet it was required to choose one
  - History and Social Studies
  - Science: This test had a common module of Biology, Physics and Chemistry (referring to the curriculum of the first two years of secondary education) and three elective modules from which one is chosen (Biology, Physics or Chemistry - referring to the curriculum of the 3rd and 4th years of secondary education)

The maximum score was of 850 points, and the minimum, 150 points.

== Stats ==
Admision Process (year)	Dates	Students		
Admision Process (year)	Dates	Enrolled	Took	Applied
2004	December 15-16th	159 249	153 383	66 947
2005	December 9-10th	176 680	169 376	76 292
2006	December 5-6th (2005)	182 761	176 314	77 765
2007	December 18-19th (2006)	242 155	211 261	87 617
2008	December 3-4th (2007)	240 851	216 892	81 909
2009	December 1-2nd (2008)	277 420	242 130	92 154
2010	November 30th and December 1st (2009)	285 325	251 634	87 875
2011	December 13-14th (2010)	289 244	250 758	84 512
2012	December 12-13 (2011)	271 862	231 172	106 719
2013	December 3-4th (2012)	272 666	233 302	118 208
2014	December 2-3rd (2013)	271 558	232 861	106 804
2015	December 1-2nd (2015)	283 080	247 291	125 588
2016	November 30th and December 1st (2015)	289 480	252 333	141 906
2017	November 28-29th (2016)	290 612	258 535	145 184
2018	November 27-28th (2017)	295 531	265 113	159 132
2019	November 26-27th (2018)	294 176	264 629	124 451
2020	January 6-7th (2020) January 27-28th (2020) February 4-5th (2020)	297 437		
