= SIMCE =

School examination system in Chile

The Sistema de Medición de la Calidad de la Educación (Education Quality Measurement System, SIMCE) is a battery of tests used in Chile to measure certain aspects of school curricula. Currently, a state agency, The Agency for Quality of Education, is in charge of administrating the tests to students in 2nd, 4th, 6th, and 8th grade (basic education) and 10th and 11th grade (2nd and 3rd years of secondary education).

== Political History ==
SIMCE is a product of the transition from a socialist-planned economy to a more subsidiary, free market oriented one, created in the military dictatorship of Augusto Pinochet (1973-1990). In 1980, a new constitution was adopted that changed the way in which the state was organized, making it more of a "subsidiary state" and promoting a technocratic and market-driven society. In education at the primary and secondary level, the constitutional push made by Pinochet's dictatorship was installed under the rhetoric of "modernization". The main elements of this modernization were underfunding public education, allocating funding through student vouchers, and allowing the entry of private entrepreneurs to compete with public schools for student enrollment.

Under this ideology, the creation of a market-driven education allowed parents, families, and policymakers to have information to make decisions as consumers in an education market. In this sense, civilians opted for developing a battery of tests of academic achievement that measured the "quality" of education, and pushed the cultural shift needed to conceive the new state. Pinochet's Minister of Education, Alfredo Prieto, stated in the early 1980s:

"The lack of a test that I have referred to would leave the educational system being designed without one of the main tools to make effective, real, and functional the rest of the measures that constitute educational modernization. Once again we see the coherence of educational modernization" (La modernización Educacional, 1983, p. 98)
