= Colegio Preciosa Sangre (Purranque) =

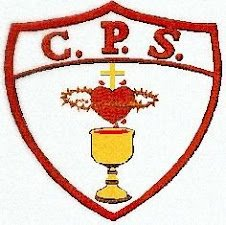
- Purranque, Chile

Information
- Type: Primary and secondary school
- Colors: Red and Blue

Colegio Preciosa Sangre (Spanish, 'Precious Blood School') is a Chilean primary and secondary school located in Purranque, Los Lagos Region, Chile.
