= Santa Cruz, Chile =

City and commune in O'Higgins, Chile

Santa Cruz
- City and Commune
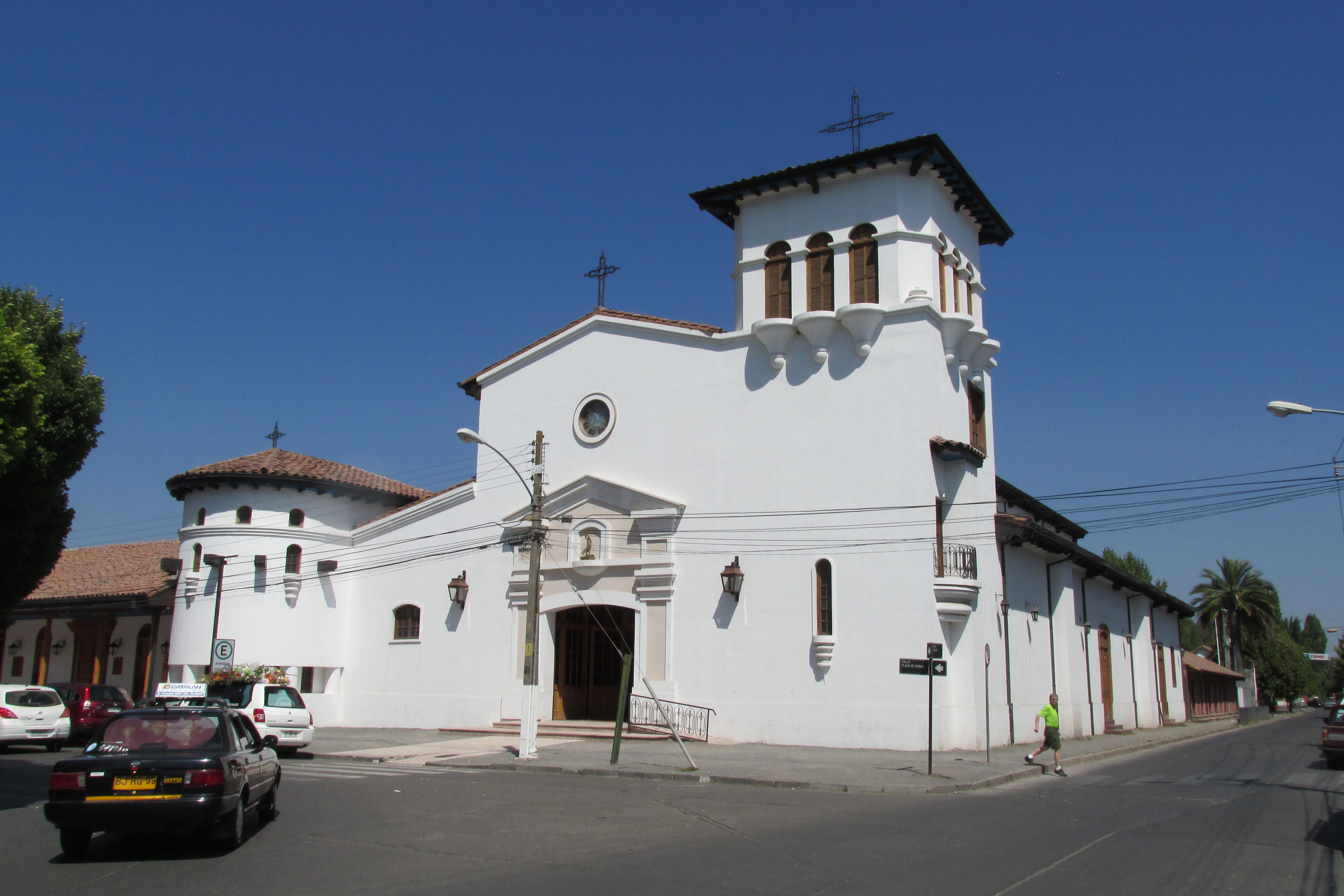
- Church of Santa Cruz

- Flag Coat of arms Map of Santa Cruz commune in O'Higgins Region Location in Chile
- Coordinates (city): 34°38′14″S 71°21′47″W
- Country: Chile
- Region: (O'Higgins Region) O'Higgins
- Province: (Colchagua Province) Colchagua

Government
  - Type: Municipality
  - Alcalde: William Arévalo

Area
  - Total: 419.5 km^{2} (162.0 sq mi)
- Elevation: 173 m (568 ft)

Population (2012 Census)
  - Total: 34,914
  - Density: 83.23/km^{2} (215.6/sq mi)
  - Urban: 18,603
  - Rural: 13,784
- Demonym: Santacruzano

Sex
  - Men: 16,160
  - Women: 16,227
- Time zone: UTC-4 (CLT)
  - Summer (DST): UTC-3 (CLST)
- Area code: 56 + 72
- Website: Official website (in Spanish)

Santa Cruz is a Chilean city and commune, located in the Colchagua valley, in the O'Higgins Region, located on the southern shore of the Tinguiririca river, 110 miles from Santiago, Chile's capital city, and 27 miles from San Fernando.

== History ==
There is no exact data about the founding of the city, although there is an official date when the city became a municipality in the year 1891, the same year that Pichilemu did.

From its beginnings, the town was a center of handcrafted artifacts and agricultural development, with wheat, tomatoes, and wine being the main products of the area. Because of the relation with countryside traditions from its beginning, Santa Cruz offers an authentic look at the rural traditions of Chilean culture expressed in the wine, the food, and the traditional sports such as the rodeo.

The city of Santa Cruz was among those affected by the 2010 Chile earthquake.

== Demographics ==
According to the 2002 census of the National Statistics Institute, Santa Cruz spans an area of 419.5 km^{2} (162 sq mi) and has 32,387 inhabitants (16,160 men and 16,227 women). Of these, 18,603 (57.4%) lived in urban areas and 13,784 (42.6%) in rural areas. The population grew by 10.7% (3,129 persons) between the 1992 and 2002 censuses.

== Tourist attractions ==
Santa Cruz has very well preserved colonial architecture. The most famous tourist attractions of the city are located in the Plaza de Armas. These include the historic Santa Cruz church, Santa Cruz Hotel, and Carillon Clock, the latter of which was constructed in 1970 and is used today as an interactive tourist information center.

== Economy ==
In the last two decades, rural tourism has become an important source of revenue for the city. The development of this industry was due especially because of the vineyards placed in the valley joint in a project called "Wine Route", that offers several tours in the area

== Climate ==
Temperate warm climate, with rains between June and November.

== Administration ==
As a commune, Santa Cruz is a third-level administrative division of Chile administered by a municipal council, headed by an alcalde, who is directly elected every four years. The 2021-2024 alcalde is William Arévalo.

== Towns and villages ==
- Isla de Yáquil
- Paniahue
- Villa Alegre

== See also ==
- Neighbourhoods in Santa Cruz, Chile
- Liceo Santa Cruz
- Carlos Cardoen
- Deportes Santa Cruz
- Media related to Santa Cruz, Chile at Wikimedia Commons
