= District 16 (Chamber of Deputies of Chile) =

Electoral district of the Chamber of Deputies of Chile

- Distrito 16
- Electoral District for the Chamber of Deputies
- Location of District 16 within Chile
- Commune: List: Chépica; Chimbarongo; La Estrella; Las Cabras; Litueche; Lolol; Marchigüe; Nancagua; Navidad; Palmilla; Paredones; Peralillo; Peumo; Pichidegua; Pichilemu; Placilla; Pumanque; San Fernando; San Vicente; Santa Cruz
- Region: O'Higgins
- Population: 373,855 (2017)
- Electorate: 334,940 (2021)
- Area: 10,557 km^{2} (2020)

Current Electoral District
- Created: 2017
- Seats: 4 (2017–present)
- Deputies: List: Félix Bugueño (FA); Eduardo Cornejo (UDI); Cosme Mellado (PR); Carla Morales (RN)

District 16 (Spanish: Distrito 16) is one of the 28 multi-member electoral districts of the Chamber of Deputies, the lower house of the National Congress, the national legislature of Chile. The district was created by the 2015 electoral reform and came into being at the following general election in 2017. It consists of the provinces of Cardenal Caro and Colchagua, and the communes of Las Cabras, Peumo, Pichidegua and San Vicente in the province of Cachapoal in the region of O'Higgins. The district currently elects four of the 155 members of the Chamber of Deputies using the open party-list proportional representation electoral system. At the 2021 general election the district had 334,940 registered electors.

== Electoral system ==
District 16 currently elects four of the 155 members of the Chamber of Deputies using the open party-list proportional representation electoral system. Parties may form electoral pacts with each other to pool their votes and increase their chances of winning seats. However, the number of candidates nominated by an electoral pact may not exceed the maximum number of candidates that a single party may nominate. Seats are allocated using the D'Hondt method.

== Election results ==
=== Summary ===
| Election | Apruebo Dignidad AD / FA | | | New Social Pact NPS / NM | | | Democratic Convergence CD | | | Chile Vamos Podemos / Vamos | | | Party of the People PDG | | | Christian Social Front FSC | | |
| Election | Votes | % | Seats | Votes | % | Seats | Votes | % | Seats | Votes | % | Seats | Votes | % | Seats | Votes | % | Seats |
|---|---|---|---|---|---|---|---|---|---|---|---|---|---|---|---|---|---|---|
| 2021 | 24,876 | 18.37% | 1 | 36,438 | 26.91% | 1 | | | | 41,397 | 30.57% | 2 | 8,746 | 6.46% | 0 | 9,518 | 7.03% | 0 |
| 2017 | 7,583 | 5.52% | 0 | 28,723 | 20.92% | 1 | 14,635 | 10.66% | 0 | 44,165 | 32.16% | 2 | | | | | | |

=== Detailed ===
==== 2021 ====
Results of the 2021 general election held on 21 November 2021:

| Party | | Pact | Party | | | | | | Pact | | |
| Party | | Pact | Votes per province | | | Total votes | % | Seats | Votes | % | Seats |
| Party | | Pact | Cacha- poal (part) | Carde- nal Caro | Colcha- gua | Total votes | % | Seats | Votes | % | Seats |
|---|---|---|---|---|---|---|---|---|---|---|---|
| National Renewal | RN | Chile Podemos + | 4,521 | 3,105 | 16,356 | 23,982 | 17.71% | 1 | 41,397 | 30.57% | 2 |
| Independent Democratic Union | UDI | Chile Podemos + | 5,224 | 3,425 | 8,766 | 17,415 | 12.86% | 1 | 41,397 | 30.57% | 2 |
| Radical Party of Chile | PR | New Social Pact | 1,929 | 281 | 11,279 | 13,489 | 9.96% | 1 | 36,438 | 26.91% | 1 |
| Socialist Party of Chile | PS | New Social Pact | 2,811 | 1,313 | 7,371 | 11,495 | 8.49% | 0 | 36,438 | 26.91% | 1 |
| Christian Democratic Party | PDC | New Social Pact | 1,133 | 3,997 | 1,965 | 7,095 | 5.24% | 0 | 36,438 | 26.91% | 1 |
| Party for Democracy | PPD | New Social Pact | 804 | 280 | 3,275 | 4,359 | 3.22% | 0 | 36,438 | 26.91% | 1 |
| Social Green Regionalist Federation | FREVS | Apruebo Dignidad | 5,791 | 1,771 | 7,155 | 14,717 | 10.87% | 1 | 24,876 | 18.37% | 1 |
| Communist Party of Chile | PC | Apruebo Dignidad | 1,845 | 1,882 | 4,866 | 8,593 | 6.35% | 0 | 24,876 | 18.37% | 1 |
| Comunes | COM | Apruebo Dignidad | 623 | 266 | 677 | 1,566 | 1.16% | 0 | 24,876 | 18.37% | 1 |
| Republican Party | REP | Christian Social Front | 2,949 | 1,337 | 5,232 | 9,518 | 7.03% | 0 | 9,518 | 7.03% | 0 |
| Party of the People | PDG | | 2,841 | 1,123 | 4,782 | 8,746 | 6.46% | 0 | 8,746 | 6.46% | 0 |
| Yasna Patricia Zavalla Morales (Independent) | Ind | | 1,859 | 832 | 5,627 | 8,318 | 6.14% | 0 | 8,318 | 6.14% | 0 |
| United Centre | CU | United Independents | 709 | 318 | 1,639 | 2,666 | 1.97% | 0 | 2,666 | 1.97% | 0 |
| Patriotic Union | UPA | | 1,771 | 210 | 555 | 2,536 | 1.87% | 0 | 2,536 | 1.87% | 0 |
| Progressive Party | PRO | | 354 | 133 | 445 | 932 | 0.69% | 0 | 932 | 0.69% | 0 |
| Valid votes | | | 35,164 | 20,273 | 79,990 | 135,427 | 100.00% | 4 | 135,427 | 100.00% | 4 |
| Blank votes | | | 3,870 | 1,891 | 4,724 | 10,485 | 6.91% | | | | |
| Rejected votes – other | | | 1,898 | 847 | 3,006 | 5,751 | 3.79% | | | | |
| Total polled | | | 40,932 | 23,011 | 87,720 | 151,663 | 45.28% | | | | |
| Registered electors | | | 91,622 | 48,580 | 194,738 | 334,940 | | | | | |
| Turnout | | | 44.67% | 47.37% | 45.05% | 45.28% | | | | | |

The following candidates were elected: Félix Bugueño (FREVS), 9,010 votes; Eduardo Cornejo (UDI), 10,892 votes; Cosme Mellado (PR), 13,489 votes; and Carla Morales (RN), 16,042 votes.

==== 2017 ====
Results of the 2017 general election held on 19 November 2017:

| Party | | Pact | Party | | | | | | Pact | | |
| Party | | Pact | Votes per province | | | Total votes | % | Seats | Votes | % | Seats |
| Party | | Pact | Cacha- poal (part) | Carde- nal Caro | Colcha- gua | Total votes | % | Seats | Votes | % | Seats |
|---|---|---|---|---|---|---|---|---|---|---|---|
| Independent Democratic Union | UDI | Chile Vamos | 8,153 | 3,946 | 18,225 | 30,324 | 22.08% | 2 | 44,165 | 32.16% | 2 |
| National Renewal | RN | Chile Vamos | 2,612 | 4,069 | 7,160 | 13,841 | 10.08% | 0 | 44,165 | 32.16% | 2 |
| Social Green Regionalist Federation | FREVS | Green Regionalist Coalition | 14,919 | 1,254 | 18,835 | 35,008 | 25.49% | 1 | 35,008 | 25.49% | 1 |
| Social Democrat Radical Party | PRSD | Nueva Mayoría | 1,095 | 586 | 9,052 | 10,733 | 7.82% | 1 | 28,723 | 20.92% | 1 |
| Party for Democracy | PPD | Nueva Mayoría | 1,419 | 951 | 6,787 | 9,157 | 6.67% | 0 | 28,723 | 20.92% | 1 |
| Socialist Party of Chile | PS | Nueva Mayoría | 1,784 | 1,185 | 5,864 | 8,833 | 6.43% | 0 | 28,723 | 20.92% | 1 |
| Christian Democratic Party | PDC | Democratic Convergence | 2,302 | 3,882 | 7,318 | 13,502 | 9.83% | 0 | 14,635 | 10.66% | 0 |
| Citizen Left | IC | Democratic Convergence | 145 | 82 | 906 | 1,133 | 0.83% | 0 | 14,635 | 10.66% | 0 |
| Humanist Party | PH | Broad Front | 1,457 | 700 | 2,606 | 4,763 | 3.47% | 0 | 7,583 | 5.52% | 0 |
| Democratic Revolution | RD | Broad Front | 736 | 481 | 1,603 | 2,820 | 2.05% | 0 | 7,583 | 5.52% | 0 |
| Samuel Flores Garrido (Independent) | Ind | | 1,246 | 388 | 3,253 | 4,887 | 3.56% | 0 | 4,887 | 3.56% | 0 |
| Progressive Party | PRO | All Over Chile | 395 | 205 | 671 | 1,271 | 0.93% | 0 | 1,271 | 0.93% | 0 |
| Patriotic Union | UPA | | 281 | 223 | 554 | 1,058 | 0.77% | 0 | 1,058 | 0.77% | 0 |
| Valid votes | | | 36,544 | 17,952 | 82,834 | 137,330 | 100.00% | 4 | 137,330 | 100.00% | 4 |
| Blank votes | | | 2,207 | 1,619 | 3,987 | 7,813 | 5.21% | | | | |
| Rejected votes – other | | | 1,267 | 715 | 2,716 | 4,698 | 3.14% | | | | |
| Total polled | | | 40,018 | 20,286 | 89,537 | 149,841 | 47.55% | | | | |
| Registered electors | | | 86,763 | 41,651 | 186,718 | 315,132 | | | | | |
| Turnout | | | 46.12% | 48.70% | 47.95% | 47.55% | | | | | |

The following candidates were elected: Ramón José Barros (UDI), 21,866 votes; Cosme Mellado (PRSD), 8,864 votes; Alejandra Sepúlveda (FREVS), 31,737 votes; and Virginia Troncoso (UDI), 7,987 votes.
