= Eduardo Cornejo Lagos =

Chilean politician (born 1972)

Eduardo Cornejo
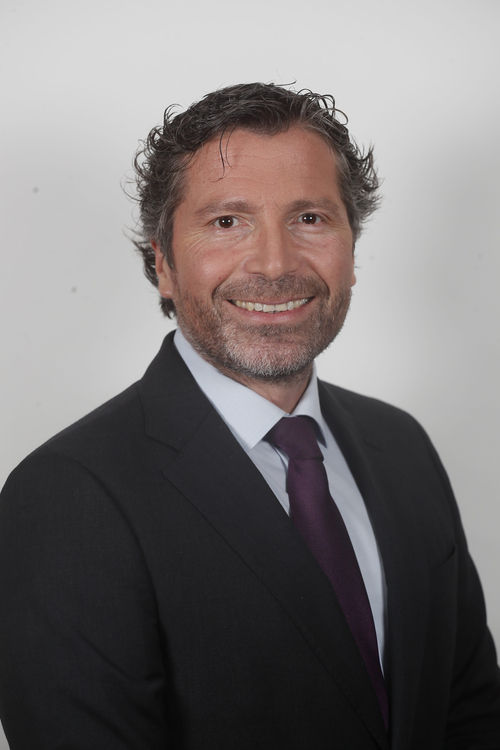

Member of the Chamber of Deputies
- In office 17 April 2022 – 11 March 2026
- Constituency: District 16

Personal details
- Born: 12 January 1972 (age 54) Santiago, Chile
- Party: Independent Democratic Union (UDI)
- Education: Alberto Hurtado University
- Occupation: Politician
- Profession: Public Administrator

Eduardo Cornejo Lagos (born 12 January 1972) is a Chilean politician who serves as deputy. He has been serving as Deputy for Chile’s 16th District in the O'Higgins Region since 11 March 2022, representing the Independent Democratic Union (UDI).

Before his election to the Chamber of Deputies, Cornejo held various public offices including municipal councillor in Pumanque and San Fernando, as well as Governor of Colchagua Province under President Sebastián Piñera. He also worked in regional public administration in the O'Higgins Region, focusing on local development and coordination between municipal and national authorities.

== Biography ==
He was born in Santiago on 12 January 1972. He is the son of Gonzalo Gabriel Cornejo Castro and Gladys Inés Lagos Romero. He is divorced and the father of two children.

He completed his primary education at Escuela F-371 in the commune of Pumanque. His secondary education was carried out at Liceo Víctor Jara in Peralillo until his third year of secondary school.

In 1990, he joined the Chilean Army, where he attained the rank of corporal second class in the Reinforced Caupolicán Regiment of Porvenir, in the province of Tierra del Fuego. He completed his secondary education in 1999 at Fundación Duoc in Santiago.

He earned a degree in Public Administration from the Alberto Hurtado University.

== Political career ==
He is a member of the Independent Democratic Union. He began his political career in 2000, when he ran as an independent candidate within the Alliance for Chile coalition for the position of councillor of the commune of Pumanque for the 2000–2004 term. In the election held in October of that year, he obtained 3.68% of the votes cast and was not elected.

In the municipal elections of October 2004, he was elected councillor of the commune of Pumanque for the 2004–2008 term, obtaining 11.38% of the valid votes cast.

In 2010, he was appointed Governor of the Province of Colchagua by President Sebastián Piñera. He held the position until July 2012. That same year, he was elected councillor of San Fernando for the 2012–2016 term. However, he resigned from the Municipal Council in 2013. Following this resignation, he immediately assumed the position of Secretary General of the Municipal Corporation of San Fernando (CORMUSAF), a role he held for four months.

During the second administration of President Sebastián Piñera, he was appointed Head of the Regional Unit of the Subsecretariat for Regional and Administrative Development (SUBDERE) in the O'Higgins Region, where he served between 2018 and 2019.

On 5 May 2019, he was appointed Regional Administrator of O'Higgins, a position from which he resigned in 2021 in order to run as a candidate for Regional Governor of the same region. He was defeated in the second round of the election.

In the parliamentary elections held on 21 November 2021, he was elected deputy for the 16th District of the O'Higgins Region, comprising the communes of Chépica, Chimbarongo, La Estrella, Las Cabras, Litueche, Lolol, Marchihue, Nancagua, Navidad, Palmilla, Paredones, Peralillo, Peumo, Pichidegua, Pichilemu, Placilla, Pumanque, San Fernando, Santa Cruz, and San Vicente, representing the Independent Democratic Union within the Chile Podemos Más coalition. He obtained 10,892 votes, corresponding to 8.04% of the valid votes cast.

He ran for re-election in the same district in the parliamentary elections of 16 November 2025, representing the Independent Democratic Union within the Chile Grande y Unido coalition. He was not elected, obtaining 10,494 votes, equivalent to 4.10% of the total votes cast.
