= Cardenal Caro Department =

Cardenal Caro Department (Spanish: Departamento Cardenal Caro) was one of the departments of Chile located in Colchagua Province.

== Background ==
There were several attempts to create a department made up by the coastal communes of the province of Colchagua, including a proposal in the 1910s for the creation of the Rapel Department, composed by the communes-subdelegations of Matanzas (currently Navidad), Pichilemu, El Rosario (now Litueche), Calleuque (current Peralillo commune), and La Estrella as the capital; however, the Congress motion failed to attract much interest.

Several decades later, on 5 September 1972, President Salvador Allende proposes the Congress to create the Peralillo Department, "to decentralize the Santa Cruz Department". Allende said that the Government made that proposal because they were worried about the "serious problems that affect the inhabitants of the communes of the Santa Cruz Department who are at greater distance from the [department's] capital". The proposed department would be made up by the communes of Peralillo —the proposed capital—, Marchigüe, Pichilemu, Rosario Lo Solís, La Estrella, and Pumanque.

Eventually, Peralillo was ruled out as the capital of the future department, despite it would mean a lesser cost to the Government, by "conditioning the commune [of Marchigüe] with basic services". The department was renamed Cardenal Caro —also called the José María Caro Department—; it was approved by the National Congress and promulgated by President Allende in August 1973.

El Cóndor, a newspaper from Santa Cruz, cited Senator Víctor Contreras Tapia: "This is an important step for administrative decentralization and opens the doors for the regional development". The same newspaper also announced a series of festivities, after the Fiestas Patrias (national holidays), "a real coastal carnival".

On 4 September 1973, the Diario Oficial de la República de Chile published the Law No. 17.965, which made official the creation of Cardenal Caro Department. However, exactly one week later, President Allende was overthrown by a coup d'état, basically making the law "dead text".

Years later, however, the Pinochet regime created the Cardenal Caro Province, with the purpose of decentralizing the new O'Higgins Region. Its capital is Pichilemu.

== See also ==
- Peralillo Department
