= Peralillo Department =

Peralillo Department Departamento de Peralillo
- (Proposed) Department of Chile
- Country: Chile
- Former province: Colchagua Province
- Proposed: 5 September 1972
- Capital: Peralillo
- Communes: List of 7: Paredones; Pumanque; Pichilemu; Marchigüe; La Estrella; Rosario Lo Solís (now Litueche); Peralillo
- Time zone: UTC-4 (CLT)
  - Summer (DST): UTC-3 (CLST)

The Peralillo Department (Spanish: Departamento de Peralillo) was a proposed Chilean department in September 1972 by President Salvador Allende Gossens, with the purpose of de-centralizing the Santa Cruz Department. Peralillo was proposed as the capital of the department by the Member of the Chamber of Deputies Héctor Ríos. The communes which were proposed to form the department were the capital, Marchigüe, Pichilemu, Rosario Lo Solís (now Litueche), La Estrella and Pumanque.

The project of the Peralillo Department, however, was rejected, and the Cardenal Caro Department was created instead, with Marchigüe as the capital, on 13 July 1973, by decree of President Allende.
