= Provincial Assembly of Santiago =

Provincial Assembly of Santiago Asamblea Provincial de Santiago

History
- Established: 1823
- Disbanded: 1833

Leadership
- President: Domingo Eyzaguirre Arechavala
- Seats: 25 deputies

The Provincial Assembly of Santiago was the provincial legislature of the former Province of Santiago of Chile, established in 1823 and confirmed by virtue of the Federal Laws of 1826. It existed, with interruptions, until 1833.

== Periods ==
=== First assembly (1823) ===
The first conformation of the Provincial Assembly of Santiago was convened on 27 February 1823, by the Board of Deputies of Santiago (Junta de Diputados de Santiago). The assembly was formally installed on 29 March 1823. During its session on 2 April, it was officially granted the title of Provincial Congress of Santiago (Congreso Provincial de Santiago). This initial assembly had a very brief existence, closing its sessions the following day on 3 April 1823.

The assembly's leadership consisted of Domingo Eyzaguirre, deputy for Santiago, who assumed the presidency, and José Manuel Barros, who served as vice president. Juan Egaña represented the assembly before the Congress of 1823.

The proprietary deputies (diputados propietarios) who made up this short-lived assembly included:

District	Deputy
Petorca	Vacant
La Ligua	Agustín de Orrego Zamora
Aconcagua	Pedro Nolasco Luco Caldera
Aconcagua	Francisco de Paula Caldera Fontecilla
Los Andes	José Miguel Infante Rojas
Quillota	Diego Elizondo Prado
Quillota	José Antonio Ovalle y Vivar
Valparaíso	José Ignacio Eyzaguirre Arechavala
Casablanca	Lorenzo Montt y Pérez de Valenzuela
Santiago	Joaquín Gandarillas Romero
Santiago	José Manuel Barros Fernández
Santiago	Manuel de Salas y Corbalán
Santiago	Pedro Nolasco Mena Ramírez
Santiago	Domingo Eyzaguirre Arechavala
Santiago	Ramón Errázuriz Aldunate
Santiago and Melipilla	Juan Egaña Risco
Rancagua	Fernando Errázuriz Aldunate
Rancagua	José Manuel Riveros Palacios
Colchagua	Francisco de Borja Fontecilla Palacios
Colchagua	José María Palacios y Soto Zárate
Colchagua	Rafael Eugenio Muñoz
Colchagua	Francisco Silva
Curicó	Joaquín Gandarillas Romero
Curicó	José Antonio Mardones
Talca	Sent representatives to the Provincial Assembly of Colchagua

=== Second assembly (1825) ===
According to the historian Isidoro Errázuriz, the provincial assemblies of this period—specifically the one active in 1825—represented a unique exception in Chilean parliamentary history. Errázuriz notes that while the assembly did not have a character of national representation, it was distinguished by its willingness to challenge the executive power and "trample upon its privileges" (atropella los fueros del Ejecutivo). He describes the assembly's firm stance as a "testimony of honor" and a promise for the future consolidation of legal institutions and the rule of law in Chile, contrasting its legislative dignity with the authoritarian tendencies of the era.

=== Third assembly (1826–1828) ===
By 1827, the Provincial Assembly of Santiago had become a central figure in the opposition to the implementation of a federalist system in Chile, with the enactment of the Federal Laws of 1826. According to historian Claude Gay, the assembly functioned as the "expression of the Chilean aristocracy" and remained a declared enemy of federalism, viewing the proposed laws regarding provincial attributes and popular elections as a threat to national unity. On 15 March 1827, the Assembly issued formal instructions to its deputies, urging them not to participate in the federalist project or the enactment of its laws, holding them responsible for any disruption to the fundamental principles of the country. When the Congress responded to these instructions with a "disdainful and arrogant" tone, claiming it would act according to its own high faculties, the Assembly retorted that while it would submit to a government that deserved acceptance, it reserved the right to dictate imperative instructions to its deputies when the pact between the Congress and the nation was on the verge of being violated. As a result of this conflict, several deputies abstained from attending the Chamber.

District	Deputy
Curacaví	Agustín Larraín Rojas
Melipilla	José Alejo Eyzaguirre Arechavala
El Monte	Juan Agustín Alcalde
Cartagena	Diego Antonio Barros
Rancagua	Manuel Ortúzar
Doñihue	Félix Campos
Peumo and Idahue	Carlos Rodríguez
San Pedro	Isidoro Errázuriz Aldunate

=== Fifth assembly (1831–1833) ===
District	Deputy
Santiago	José Domingo Bezanilla Bezanilla
Santiago	Fernando Márquez de la Plata Encalada
Rancagua	José Martín Avaria Ortiz de Zárate
Rancagua	Estanislao Portales Larraín
Rancagua	Miguel del Castillo
	Manuel Joaquín de Valdivieso Maciel
Antonio Jacobo Vial Formas
José Manuel Astorga Camus
Pedro Morán
José Ignacio Valdés Larrea
Ambrosio Aldunate Carvajal
Fernando Márquez de la Plata Encalada
Miguel Mendoza
Manuel de Salas y Corbalán
Ignacio Reyes Saravia
Domingo Eyzaguirre Arechavala
Francisco de Borja Olivera
Pedro Nolasco León Toro
Agustín Larraín Rojas
Domingo Otaegui
Diego Antonio Barros Fernández de Leiva
José Antonio Montt Irarrázaval
Juan de la Cruz Gandarillas Guzmán
Juan de Dios Correa de Saa
Isidoro Errázuriz Aldunate

== Bibliography ==
- Valencia Avaria, Luis. Anales de la República. Vol. II. Universitaria, 1951.
