= Óscar López =

Óscar López may refer to:

- Óscar López (guitarist) (born 1953), Chilean-Canadian guitarist
- Oscar López (footballer, born 1937), Argentinian footballer and manager
- Óscar López (Colombian footballer) (1939–2005), Colombian international footballer
- Óscar López (footballer, born 1980), Spanish footballer
- Óscar López (footballer, born 1984), Spanish footballer
- Oscar López (Nicaraguan footballer) (born 1992), Nicaraguan international footballer
- Óscar López (footballer, born 2006), Bolivian international footballer
- Oscar López Rivera (born 1943), Puerto Rican pro-independence activist
- Óscar López (Spanish politician) (born 1973), Spanish politician
- Óscar López (Costa Rican politician), Costa Rican politician
- Óscar López Rodríguez, Chilean seller of antiquities, known for the death of two people in Lolol
