= Provincial assemblies of Chile =

Former legislatures of the provinces of Chile

Provincial assemblies of Chile were legislative bodies established in the provinces of Chile under the Federal Laws of 1826, during the period known as the Organization of the Republic. They functioned as provincial parliaments within a short-lived federalist experiment and operated intermittently between 1826 and 1831.

== Background and operation ==
The provincial assemblies were created as part of the federal reforms promoted by Congress in 1826. These reforms sought to reorganize Chile as a federal republic, granting significant political and administrative autonomy to the provinces. Among the principal measures adopted were the popular election of provincial authorities, the creation of provincial legislatures, and the decentralization of governmental functions.

The assemblies were intended to exercise legislative authority at the provincial level, complementing the national Congress and embodying the principles of territorial self-government.

Each provincial assembly was composed of deputies elected from local districts or departments within the province. The number of members varied by province. The assemblies elected their own authorities, typically including a president, one or more secretaries, and, in some cases, a vice president.

Their functions included deliberating on local governance matters, administering provincial affairs, and implementing the federal framework established by national legislation. When assemblies entered recess, their powers were often delegated to a permanent commission composed of selected deputies.

Provincial assemblies were established in the provinces created or reorganized by the federal legislation of 1826. Documented assemblies include those of:

- Coquimbo
- Aconcagua
- Santiago
- Colchagua
- Maule
- Concepción
- Valdivia
- Chiloé

The degree of institutional stability varied among provinces, and some assemblies experienced interruptions in their operation due to political conflict or administrative difficulties.

The assemblies began operating in late 1826 following the promulgation of the federal laws. During their existence, they functioned as the principal organs of provincial political representation. However, the federal experiment soon encountered strong opposition. Disagreements over territorial organization, provincial authority, and the location of administrative capitals led to conflicts within and between provinces. In some cases, rival or parallel representative bodies emerged at the departmental level, such as the Departmental Assembly of Talca.

In August 1827, national legislation suspended the implementation of the federal system. Although several provincial assemblies ceased to function shortly thereafter, some continued operating intermittently until 1831, when the federal institutional framework effectively disappeared.
