= Provincial Assembly of Colchagua =

- Coat of Arms of Chile (1819–1834)

Type
- Type: Provincial assembly of Colchagua (historical province)

Leadership
- President: Juan José Urivi (1826–1827)
- Seats: 18

The Provincial Assembly of Colchagua was the provincial parliament of Colchagua, established by virtue of the Federal Laws of 1826, and which existed intermittently until 1831.

== History ==
=== First assembly (1826–1828) ===
The Provincial Assembly of Colchagua was established on 7 December 1826, composed of the deputies Antonio del Castillo y Saravia (Pumanque), Juan José Echenique (Pichidegua), Francisco Javier Lira (Reto), Francisco de Borja Orihuela (San Antonio de Colchagua), José Clemente Ramírez (El Olivar), Pedro Rencoret (Nancagua), Alejandro Sepúlveda (Río Claro, present-day Rengo), José María Silva (Santa Cruz), Juan Francisco Urzúa (Paredones), Antonio Rafael de Velasco (Guacarhue), Ramón Formas, Mateo Labra y Cervelle, Francisco Merino, Fernando Olmedo, José María Palacios, Nolasco Polloni, Manuel Fernando de Quezada and Juan José Urivi, who served as its first president until 19 February 1827. The first secretary of the Assembly was Luis Labarca, who was not a deputy. Luis Valencia Avaria (1951) states that this parliament was composed of 18 deputies, among whom also appeared, “probably as replacements”, Juan Francisco Azúa and José Tomás Argomedo, who was elected representing Chimbarongo in August 1827. It ceased to exist in January 1828.

=== Second assembly (1829–?) ===
The Colchagua assembly resumed operations on 31 May 1829, after more than one year of recess. It was composed of parliamentarians representing Curicó: Romualdo Antonio González, Agustín Aldea, Diego Donoso and Francisco Prado; and representing San Fernando: Manuel Villela, Juan José Echenique, Pedro Rencoret, Manuel Bravo Reyes, José Toribio Lira, Francisco Pérez de Valenzuela, Francisco Porras, Lucas Grez, Fermín Fuentes and José Tomás Argomedo. Deputies Argomedo and González served as secretaries. The chamber was presided over by Francisco Pérez de Valenzuela beginning in June. This assembly did not include deputies from the Talca, who declared themselves in rebellion against the decision to establish the capital of Colchagua in Curicó, independently establishing the Departmental Assembly of Talca. The date on which the second Colchagua assembly ceased its functions is unknown.

=== Third and final assembly (1831–?) ===
This provincial parliament was constituted for the third and final time on 17 June 1831, again without participation from residents of the Talca, who continued operating their own Departmental Assembly. Deputies representing San Fernando included the presbyters Domingo Echavarrieta and José Miguel Ríos, along with Ramón Valenzuela, Bartolomé Sepúlveda, José Ramón Herrera, Mariano Guerrero, José Marful, Ramón Sepúlveda, Simón Maturana and José Antonio Francino; representing Curicó were the presbyter Laureano Díaz and the citizens Francisco Donoso, José Maturana and Francisco Muñoz. (Note: Additionally, José Matías Ravanal and Ramón Arias appear as alternates for San Fernando.) Deputy Guerrero served as secretary, while Ramón Sepúlveda held the office of president. The date of dissolution of this assembly is unknown.

== Presidents ==
First Assembly (7 December 1826–circa January 1827)

- 7 December 1826–19 February 1827 — Juan José Urivi.
- 19 February–20 March 1827 — Mateo Labra Cervelle.
- 20 March–2 November 1827 — Francisco de Borja Orihuela.
- 2 November 1827–circa January 1828 — Pedro Rencoret Cienfuegos.

Second Assembly (31 May 1829–?)

- June 1829–? — Francisco Pérez de Valenzuela.

Third Assembly (17 June 1831–?)

- 17 June 1831–? — Ramón Sepúlveda Salcedo.
