= Provincial Assembly of Coquimbo =

- Coat of Arms of Chile (1819–1834)

Type
- Type: Provincial assembly of Coquimbo Province
- Seats: 9

The Provincial Assembly of Coquimbo was the provincial parliament of Coquimbo, established by virtue of the Federal Laws of 1826, and which existed intermittently until 1831.

== History ==
=== First assembly (1826–1829) ===
The Provincial Assembly of Coquimbo was established on 30 November 1826, composed of the deputies Manuel Antonio González (Copiapó), Juan Agustín Badiola (Vallenar), Jorge Edwards Brown (Freirina), the presbyter José Miguel Solar (La Serena) — who served as the first president of the Assembly —, Juan Jerónimo Espinoza (Cutún), Gregorio Cordovez (Elqui), Tadeo Cortés (Andacollo), Francisco Sainz de la Peña (Limarí), Daniel W. Frost (Sotaquí), Juan Miguel Munizaga (Carén), Francisco Bascuñán y Aldunate (Barraza), Ventura del Solar (Illapel) and José Salinas (Mincha).

The first secretary of the Assembly was Manuel Antonio González, who was deputy for Copiapó. Luis Valencia Avaria (1951) notes that Gregorio Cordovez had been elected deputy in two districts simultaneously: Vallenar and Elqui, choosing the latter as his representation, and therefore Agustín Badiola was elected to fill the vacancy; it is also noted that the election of Jorge Edwards as deputy for Freirina took place on 22 January 1827. Francisco Sainz de la Peña and Juan Miguel Munizaga resigned on 15 December 1826 and were replaced by Joaquín Vicuña and Francisco Herreros, respectively; that same month Daniel W. Frost died and Ramón Varela was elected in his place. The Assembly declared itself in recess on 13 February 1828, leaving a Permanent Commission in charge.

=== Second and final assembly (1831) ===
This provincial parliament was constituted for the second and final time on 24 March 1831. Deputies representing Coquimbo were Jorge Edwards Brown, Ventura Solar, José Santiago Rodríguez and José Salinas; representing Elqui were Juan Miguel Munizaga and Pedro de Santiago Concha; representing Huasco was José Agustín Cabezas; while representing Copiapó were José Antonio Subercaseaux and Francisco Ignacio Ossa. (Note: Additionally, Antonino Cordovez appears as alternate for Huasco.) Deputy Rodríguez served as secretary, while Edwards held the office of president and Ossa that of vice president.

On 24 April 1831 the Assembly agreed to “withdraw” until 20 June, the date on which Congress was to be in operation; therefore its powers were entrusted to a Permanent Commission, which was still in office in November of that year and was composed of deputies Salinas, Concha and Rodríguez.

== Presidents ==
First Assembly (30 November 1826–August 1829)

- 30 November 1826–9 February 1827 — José Miguel Solar.
- 9 February–16 March 1827 — Gregorio Cordovez.
- 16 March–20 April 1827 — Jorge Edwards Brown.
- 20 April–28 May 1827 — Ventura Solar.
- 28 May–20 July 1827 — Manuel Antonio González.
- 20 July–3 September 1827 — Gregorio Cordovez.
- 3 September 1827–19 January 1828 — Juan Agustín Badiola.
- 19 January–June 1829 — José Miguel Solar.
- June–August 1829 — José de Piñera y Lombera.
- August 1829 — Francisco Bascuñán y Aldunate.

Second Assembly (24 March 1831–?)

- 24 March 1831–? — Jorge Edwards Brown.
