= Coquimbo Province =

Coquimbo Province Provincia de Coquimbo
- Province of Chile
- 1826–1976
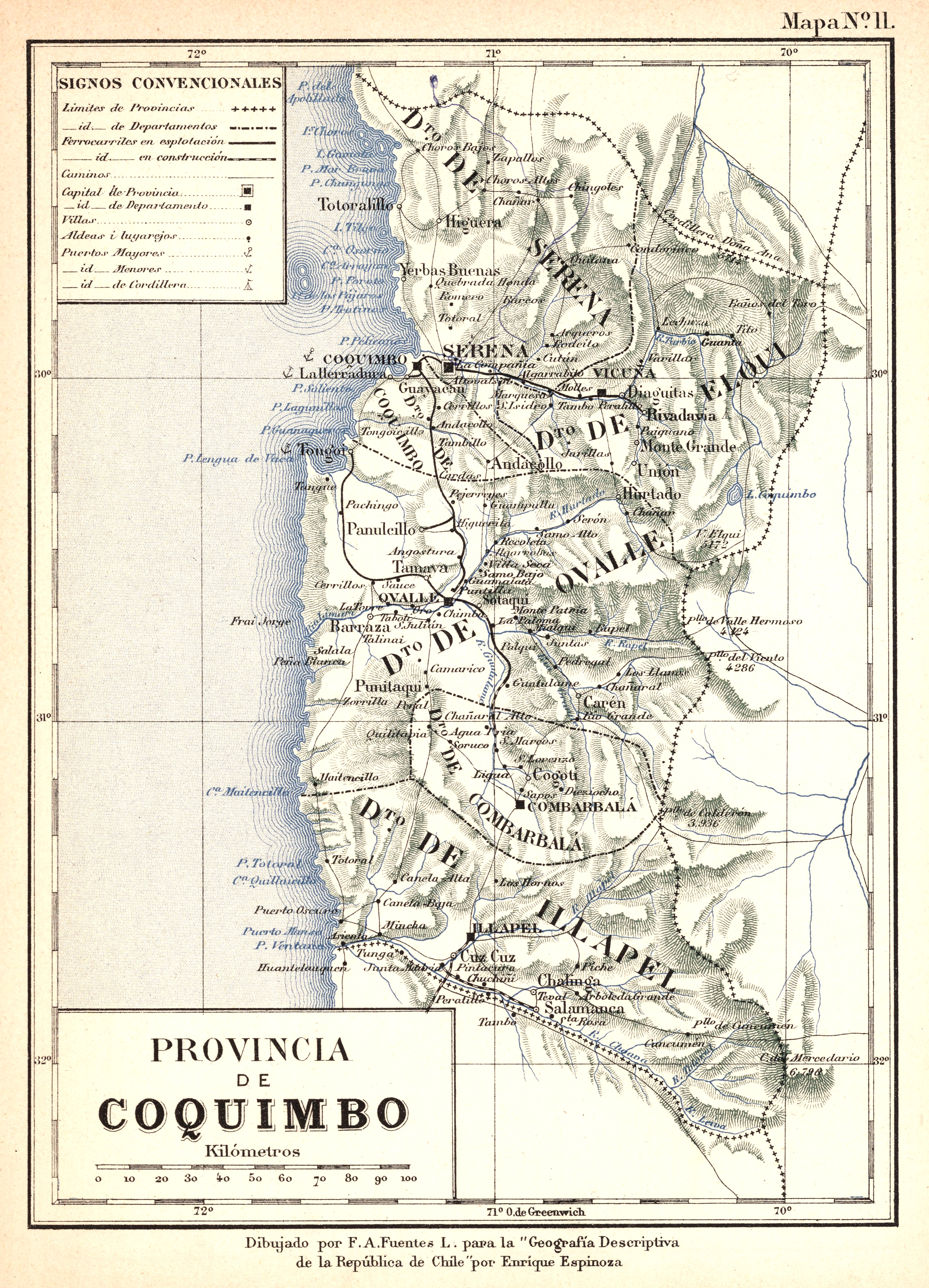
- Map of the Chilean province of Coquimbo, c. 1895.
- Capital: La Serena
- History
  - Federal laws of 1826: 1826
  - Regionalization of Chile: 1976
Preceded by	Succeeded by
Intendancy of Coquimbo	Coquimbo Region
- Today part of: Coquimbo Region

Coquimbo Province was one of the administrative divisions of Chile from 1826 to 1976. The government of the province was headed by the provincial intendant.

== History ==
The Province of Coquimbo was one of the original eight provinces (Coquimbo, Aconcagua, Santiago, Colchagua, Maule, Concepción, Valdivia and Chiloé) created in Chile by the federal laws on 30 August 1826, from the former Intendancy of Coquimbo.

The province initially included the following delegations:

Delegation	Capital
Copiapó	Copiapó
Huasco	Freirina
La Serena	La Serena
Illapel	Illapel

Its territory extended from the Atacama Desert in the north to the Choapa River in the south.

Under the Constitution of 1828, Chile was divided into eight provinces. During this period, the Combarbalá Department and the Elqui Department were created. By decree of 22 April 1831, issued by the Provincial Assembly of Coquimbo, the town of Ovalle was founded and the limits of the future Ovalle Department were established. Subsequently, the future Freirina Department and Vallenar Department were created from the Huasco Department.

With the 1833 Constitution, provinces were divided into departments. Departments were subdivided into subdelegations, which were further divided into districts.

By the mid-19th century, the province comprised the following departments:

Department	Capital
Copiapó	Copiapó
Freirina	Freirina
Vallenar	Vallenar
Elqui	Vicuña
La Serena	La Serena
Ovalle	Ovalle
Combarbalá	Combarbalá
Illapel	Illapel

On 31 October 1843, the departments of Copiapó, Freirina and Vallenar were separated to create the new Province of Atacama.

By 1856, the province included the departments of Elqui, La Serena, Ovalle, Combarbalá and Illapel.

On 28 September 1864, the Department of the Port of Coquimbo was created.

By 1925, the departments were:

Department	Capital
Elqui	Vicuña
La Serena	La Serena
Coquimbo	Coquimbo
Ovalle	Ovalle
Combarbalá	Combarbalá
Illapel	Illapel

In 1928, the departments of Coquimbo and Combarbalá were suppressed under DFL 8582 of 30 December 1927, leaving the province with the departments of Serena, Elqui, Ovalle and Illapel.

In 1933, the suppressed departments were restored with some modifications, including the renaming of the Department of the Port of Coquimbo simply to Coquimbo.

Later, beginning 1 January 1976, the province was reorganized as part of the Coquimbo Region.
