= El Durazno =

El Durazno may refer to:

- El Durazno, Argentina, a village in Catamarca Province, Argentina
- El Durazno, O'Higgins, a village in O'Higgins Region, Chile
- El Durazno, Coquimbo, a village in Coquimbo Region, Chile
