= Murders of María José Reyes and Juan Duarte =

Chilean double murder

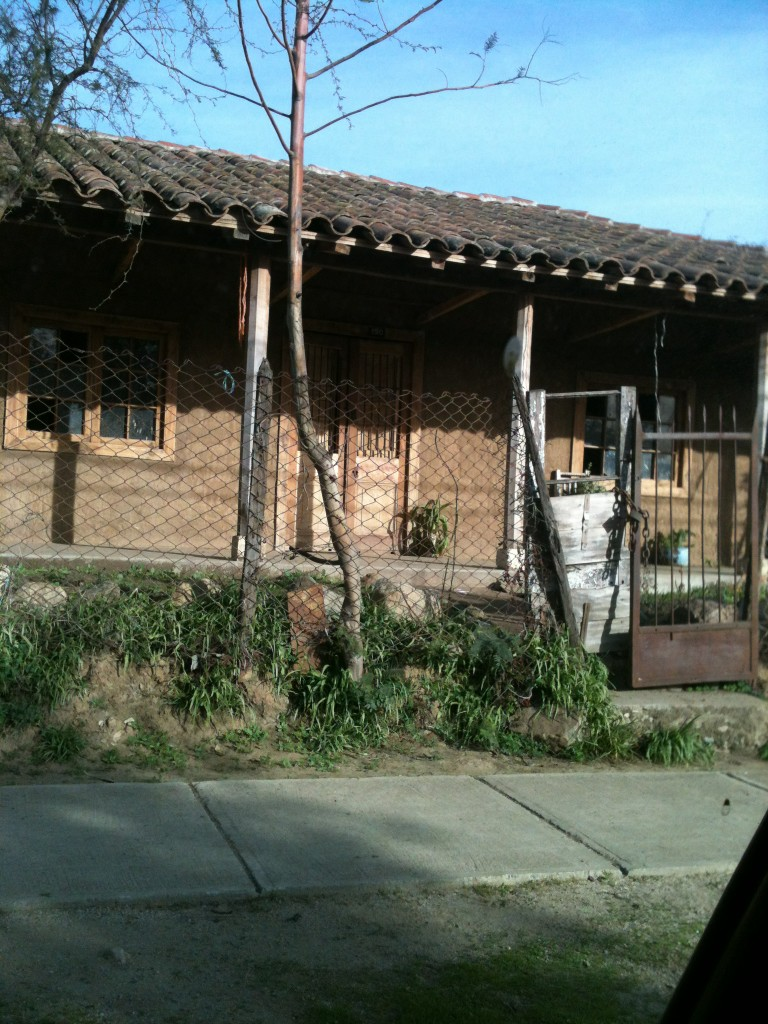
Óscar López's house and antique shop, the crime scene, in late July 2012

María José Reyes Moore and Juan René Duarte Becerra were murdered in July 2012 in an antique shop in Lolol, Colchagua Province, O'Higgins Region, Chile. Both victims had visited the shop as customers and were attacked and decapitated by shop owner Óscar López Rodríguez.

The murderer was shot and killed by police responding to the scene of the Reyes murder. An analysis of accounts by people who knew him suggests that he was suffering from psychosis and "mystical delusions". He has been labeled the "Monster of Lolol" by Chilean media.

== Attacks ==
=== First attack ===
Most accounts say that on 10 July 2012 Juan Duarte visited Óscar López's antique shop "to purchase an iron stick". Duarte's housemaid, Olga Morales, told El Mercurio that he was, "actually interested in an old little table". Several people saw Duarte talking with López that afternoon.

Carabineros de Chile, the Chilean military police, stated that López stabbed Duarte in the back and subsequently beheaded him. They believed that Duarte tried to defend himself "tenaciously". López kept Duarte's head in a coffer, which was up for sale in his antique shop, and buried the rest of his body under rocks in his backyard. The following day, 11 July, Duarte's family filed a presunta desgracia (disappearance) claim with the Lolol police.

=== Second attack ===
On 12 July, María José Reyes Moore was traveling with two of her children, her 15-year-old daughter and 19-year-old son, to Fundo Querelena in the Bucarruca area in the commune of Paredones, Cardenal Caro Province. Her husband and her two other children were traveling later that day. At around 13:00 local time (17:00 UTC), she decided to stop in Lolol. She pulled up at Los Alerces Street 145 and went into López Rodríguez's antique shop with her daughter; her son stayed in the car.

Less than five minutes later and apparently without reason, López took Reyes Moore by her hair and stabbed her. Her daughter ran out of the shop to tell her brother. When they got back, they saw López taking their severely injured mother to a tree trunk in his backyard, where he proceeded to decapitate her with an axe.

Reyes Moore's children ran out of the antique shop to ask for help and, according to witnesses, shouting "They're killing our mommy!" (¡Están matando a la mamita!). Because it was Lolol's payday, the streets of the town were full of people. The teenagers eventually found a policeman, Sergeant Felipe González, who quickly got to the crime scene. In the meantime, López had taken Reyes' head and showed it to passers-by, raising the severed head "like a trophy". When González reached him, he ordered López to stop and fired into the air twice without receiving any response from López. López then rushed towards the policeman with the bloody axe he had used to decapitate Reyes Moore, forcing González to shoot him with his service weapon, killing him.

== Murderer ==
Óscar López Rodríguez
- Óscar López with his dog Valentín, in April 2012
- Born: Óscar Segundo López Rodríguez; 1 November 1972; Lolol, Colchagua Province, Chile
- Died: 12 July 2012 (aged 39); Lolol, Colchagua Province, O'Higgins Region, Chile
- Occupation: Antiquities dealer
- Spouse: Sandra Poblete (m. 1992; div. 2011)
- Children: 1
- Status: Killed by policeman during an attempted attack

Details
- Victims: 2–3
- Date: 10–12 July 2012

Óscar Segundo López Rodríguez, labeled by the Chilean media as the Monstruo de Lolol ("Monster of Lolol"), was born on 1 November 1972 in Lolol, Colchagua Province, O'Higgins Region. His parents were Óscar del Carmen López Araya and Osvaldina de las Rosas Rodríguez Espinosa. Considered a "violent" and "lonely man" by his neighbors, López claimed to be a "messenger of God". López liked to dress as anime characters. He was known in Lolol as "the Hippie", because of his "intentionally unkempt look, with beard and long hair", possibly inspired in the looks of Jesus Christ. Some Lolol residents have told the media that López may have been part of a satanic sect. He was also a user of marijuana, which he reportedly also sold.

López began collecting phonographs, lamps, cart wheels and iron gates in 1997, when he moved to Los Boldos, a rural area near Santa Cruz. Sometime afterwards, he moved to Los Robles, six kilometers from the urban centre of Lolol, where he joined an "ecologic community", from which he was later expelled. In August 2009, he moved to Las Palmas, three kilometers from central Lolol, and lived in three different houses there until March 2010. After the earthquake of 27 February 2010, he moved to his last home, an old adobe house, located in front of the Lolol firefighters' bureau. There, he established an antique shop in the front of the house.

In an article published in regional newspaper El Mundo Rural in April 2012, López Rodríguez was described as a "modest man, who has worked hard with the shovel and the plow in the countryside", but "[his life] is devoted to visiting houses and rescuing antiquities which he repairs and sells to wealthy families". El Mundo Rural also remarked on his ability to ride his bike with his dog Valentín standing on it.

López Rodríguez married Sandra Andrea Poblete Gaete (b. 16 August 1973) in Santa Cruz, on 31 August 1992. The couple had a son (born 1992), and divorced on 6 April 2011.

== Victims ==
María José Reyes

=== María José Reyes ===
María José Reyes Moore (born in Santiago, 25 June 1966) was a teacher of physical education from Vitacura, in the Santiago Metropolitan Region.

Reyes Moore, nicknamed Coté, completed her secondary education at Colegio Villa María in 1984. She worked between 1992 and 2007 as physical education teacher in Colegio San Francisco de Asís in Las Condes. She left that educational institution in 2007 because she "wanted to devote more time to her family".

Shortly afterwards, she began working at Colegio El Golf in Vitacura, where she created a class called La Academia (The Academy). La Academia consisted of a pre-employment and functional workshop dedicated to high school graduates with special educational needs (necesidades educacionales especiales).

She married farmer Wenceslao Fernando Montero Sánchez (b. 11 December 1962) on 4 December 1989. The couple had four children.

=== Juan Duarte ===
Juan Duarte

Juan René Duarte Becerra (born in Lolol, 7 January 1956) was a farmer born and raised in Lolol, living his whole life there. Known as "Juanito" or "Don Juanito" by most of the people in the small town of Lolol, Duarte worked for twenty years as a seasonal worker in the Viña Casa Silva estate in the commune of San Fernando. He was known in his hometown as a "good", "hard-working" person. At the time of his death, he was under medical license because of a recent surgery, which removed a hernia from his spine.

He married María Adriana Rodríguez Espina (b. 12 May 1953) on 3 May 1976. He was the uncle of Leandro Duarte Maldonado, a councillor (concejal) of the Lolol town hall from the Social Democrat Radical Party.

== Aftermath ==
The murders were widely covered by the local media, and "shocked" the Chilean nation. The inhabitants of Lolol, known as a "peaceful" rural town which was declared a National Monument under the category of Zona Típica ("Typical Zone") for its colonial architecture, were "anguished", and the town's streets were "empty" one week after the crimes. Some residents told the media they have been "ridiculed" in other towns, and asked for Óscar Lopez's house to be demolished. The mayor of Lolol, Marco Marín, told La Tercera the crime "would mark a 'before and after' in the history of Lolol".

=== Investigation ===
The same day of the murder of Reyes and López's death, the Labocar (Laboratorio de Criminalística de Carabineros, lit. 'Carabineers' Laboratory of Criminology') inspected the crime scene, under the request of public prosecutor Carmen Gloria Agurto, finding the decapitated body of another victim, later identified as Juan Duarte Becerra. Labocar also checked some wells in the back yard of López's house. The following day, looking for more possible victims and evidence, the Labocar and GOPE (Grupo de Operaciones Policiales Especiales, lit. 'Group of Special Police Operations'), Chile's police tactical unit, continued to inspect the crime scene and visited López's former residence in Las Palmas, without finding any human remains.

Following the murders, there was suspicion that López Rodríguez might also have killed Manuel Fuenzalida Piña, a man from the commune of Pumanque, also in Colchagua Province, who had disappeared in March 2012 and was last seen talking with López. Police searched López's shop and former residences for additional human remains, but did not find any.

O'Higgins Region public prosecutor Luis Toledo announced the Ministerio Público would give psychological assistance to Reyes' children, as they witnessed the crime. The public prosecutor office of Santa Cruz requested the OS-9 (Departamento Investigación de Organizaciones Criminales; Department of Investigation of Criminal Organizations) to prepare a "psychological autopsy", as not much was known as to why López committed the crime, creating a profile based on interviews with people who interacted with him, and information extracted from the crime scene. The results of the "psychological autopsy" were made public on 25 July 2012, and pointed out that López Rodríguez "suffered from transitory psychosis, mystical delusions and bizarre behaviours".

Sergeant Felipe González, aged 26, was given "psychological help" by the Carabineros, and was "calm with the help of the Carabineros authorities". However, his actions are to be investigated as to whether they adhered to the rules of the Carabineros or not.

=== Funerals ===
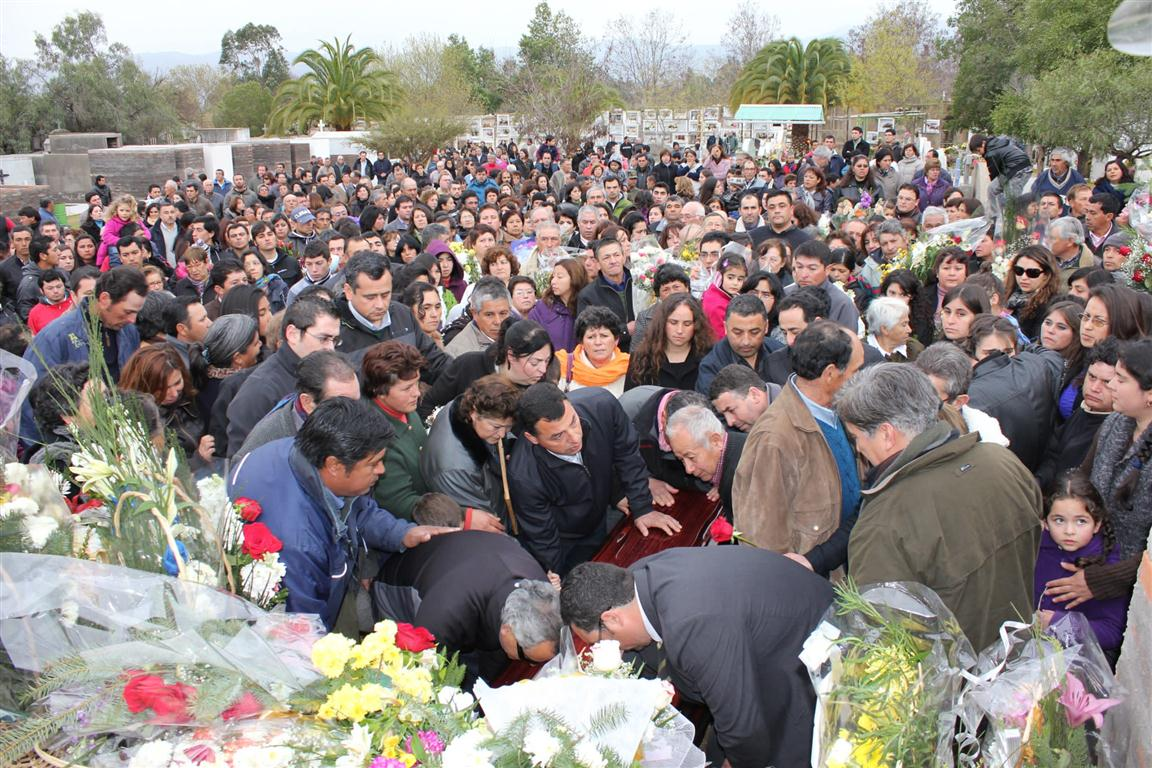
Funeral of Juan Duarte Becerra at the Municipal Cemetery of Lolol, on 14 July 2012

On 13 July 2012, at around 09:00 local time (13:00 UTC), relatives of María José Reyes arrived at the Legal Medical Service of San Fernando, where an autopsy was done, and took her body to Vitacura, Santiago Metropolitan Region, where a wake over her body was held at Parroquia San Juan de Apóstol. A mass commanded by priest Osvaldo Fernández was held on 14 July 2012 at the Parroquia San Juan de Apóstol, attended by about one thousand people. María José Reyes' body was taken to the Parque del Recuerdo cemetery, where she was cremated and later buried.

The body of Juan Duarte Becerra was mourned at his mother's home in Lolol on 13 July 2012. During the early morning of the following day, and after an evangelical prayer, his body was buried in the Municipal Cemetery of Lolol. The funeral was attended by hundreds of Lolol residents.

Óscar López Rodriguez's body was taken by his son during the night of 13 July 2012 from the Legal Medical Service of San Fernando. His body was waked at his parents' home in Los Boldos, near Santa Cruz, and was buried the following day in the Cemetery of Santa Cruz, in a ceremony attended by about a hundred persons. His former wife did not attend his funeral.
