= Constitution of 1826 =

Constitution of 1826 may refer to:

- The Argentine Constitution of 1826
- The Bolivian Constitution of 1826
- The Constitution of Peru (1826)
- The Constitutional Charter of 1826 (Portugal)
- The Federal Laws of 1826 of Chile; incorrectly called a Constitution
