= Liceo Bicentenario Técnico Profesional de Peralillo =

High school in Chile

Coordinates: 34.47461°S 71.48017°W

- Peralillo, Chile

Information
- Type: High school

Liceo Bicentenario Técnico Profesional de Peralillo (English: Technical-Professional Bicentennial High School of Peralillo) is a high school located in Peralillo, Colchagua Province, Chile.
