= Ramon Sepulveda =

Ramon Sepulveda may refer to:

- Ramón Sepúlveda Leal (1886–1970), Chilean politician and labour leader
- Ramón Sepúlveda, 19th-century Chilean politician, president of the Provincial Assembly of Colchagua
