= Puertecillo =

Beach in Cile

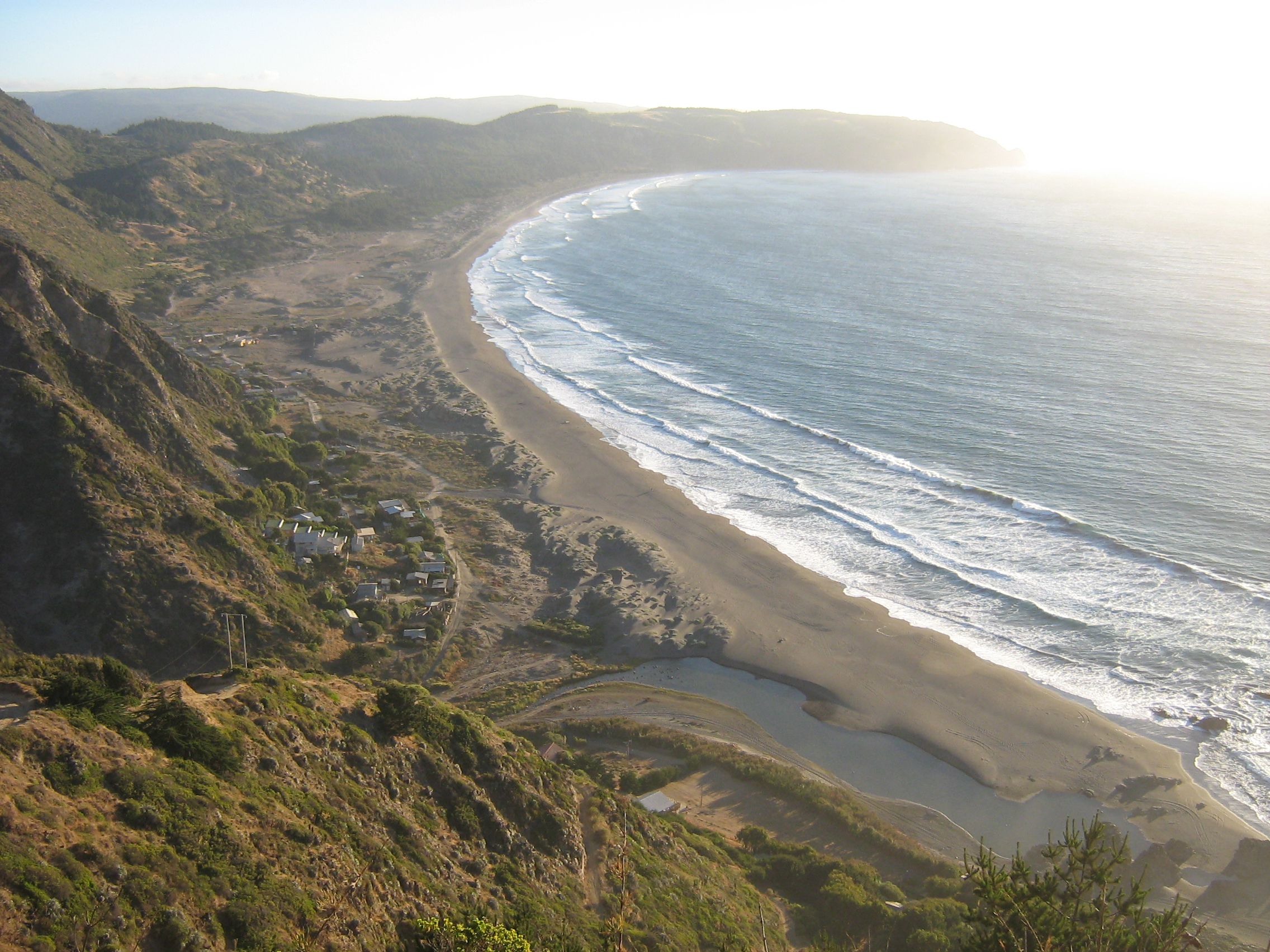
Puertecillo, as seen from Cuesta Polcura

Puertecillo is a beach located inside the Topocalma Fundo in Navidad, Cardenal Caro Province, Chile. It was discovered by surfers in the late 1980s. On the south end of the beach there is a long sand bottom left point break. Over the last 20 years, several surfers have built a surfing-oriented community. The main gathering spot is the "Para de Gozar", where a culture of taking care of the beach is the main focus.

Since developers built a road through the forest and ran electrical lines several years ago there are few houses now and a handful of residents, less than 100, and a few tourists, most surfers. There are about 3 restaurants, 1 small store, a couple of real estate offices, and some houses. Still the beaches are for the most part empty. There is a real estate development there too, which this publication calls a threat, but there's not a lot of flat ground to build and what has been built so far is small.
