= Francisco Silva =

Francisco Silva may refer to:

- Francisco Silva (1920s footballer), Portuguese football defender
- Francisco Silva (Mexican footballer) (born March 1983), Mexican football defender
- Francisco Silva (footballer, born April 1983), Uruguayan football midfielder
- Francisco Silva (footballer, born 1986), Chilean football defensive midfielder for Deportes Limache
- Francisco Silva (footballer, born 2005), Portuguese football goalkeeper for Sporting CP
- Francisco Everardo Oliveira Silva (born 1965), or Tiririca, Brazilian comedian and politician
