= Matanzas, Chile =

Matanzas
- village
- Seashore at dusk in Matanzas

- Map of Matanzas in O'Higgins Region, continental Chile.

- Location within Chile
- Coordinates: 33°57′35.88″S 71°52′17.63″W
- Country: Chile
- Region: (O'Higgins Region) O'Higgins
- Province: (Cardenal Caro Province) Cardenal Caro
- Elevation: 10 to 100 m (33 to 328 ft)

Population
  - Total: 590
- Time zone: UTC-4 (CLT)
  - Summer (DST): UTC-3

Matanzas is a coastal village famous for its beach, located in the commune of Navidad in the O'Higgins Region of Chile.

== Location ==
Matanzas is located in the north west of Cardenal Caro Province, O'Higgins Region, and forms part of the commune of Navidad, Chile. Is located 160 kilometres south of Santiago and 58 kilometres north of Pichilemu.

== History ==
Matanzas was a famous harbour during the time of the colonization of Chile, and was the place where part of the Spanish army responsible for the occupation of Chile’s Zona Central disembarked. The place was also frequented by pirates. The name "Matanzas" (Spanish for “slaughter” or “killing”) comes from the sea lion hunting and processing industry, which were used to provide oil and other goods.

A local story tells of a visit from Sir Francis Drake, who disembarked and was well received in Matanzas. Another tells of a sunken Spanish galleon out off the coast.

== Matanzas as a tourist destination ==
The beach at Matanzas is known for its fine grey sand and year-round windy weather, making it an ideal place to practice surfing, boogyboarding, stand up paddling, windsurfing and kitesurfing. Matanzas is also known for its rich fauna. The islets of Lobos and Pajaros provide a nesting ground for several bird species and the English scientist Charles Darwin discovered 31 species around Matanzas in his 1846 analysis of the Navidad Formation. The area includes many species of molluscs that were last reviewed extensively by Philippi (1887).

There are basic services in Matanzas such as a school, hotels, cabins for rent and camp sites. Local industry is dominated by the farming of agriculture and livestock. Matanzas is growing as a tourist destination. With the expansion of the "Surazo" Hotel & Restaurant, many wealthy Chileans come here on the weekend.

== See also ==
- Outline of Chile
- List of cities in Chile
- Cardenal Caro Province
- O'Higgins Region
- Navidad, Chile
