= Oscar López (footballer, born 1937) =

Argentine footballer and manager

Personal information
- Date of birth: 11 December 1937 (age 88)
- Place of birth: Lanús, Argentina
- Position: Midfielder

Senior career*
Years	Team	Apps	(Gls)
1957–1959	Independiente	29	(9)
1960–1965	Banfield		
1966	Boca Juniors	8	(0)
1967–1969	Quilmes	105	(30)
1970–1971	Banfield		

Managerial career
- 1980: Arsenal de Sarandí
- Ferro Carril Oeste
- Banfield
- Deportivo Español
- Quilmes
- 1985: San Lorenzo
- 1989–1990: Sporting Cristal
- 1990: Textil Mandiyú
- 1998: Huracán
- 2000–2001: Racing
- 2002: Armenia
- 2002–2003: Pyunik
- * Club domestic league appearances and goals

Oscar López (born 11 December 1937 in Lanús) is a retired Argentinian midfielder, and a current football manager.

López started his playing career in 1957 with Independiente. In 1960, he moved down a division to play for Banfield where he was part of the team that won the Argentine 2nd division in 1962.

In 1966 he had an unsuccessful spell with Boca Juniors which was plagued by injuries. He then played for Quilmes before returning to Banfield where he retired in 1971.

López then went on to become a football coach. He has had spells as manager of many teams including Arsenal de Sarandí, Ferro Carril Oeste, Textil Mandiyú, Banfield, Deportivo Español, Quilmes and Huracán in Argentina. He has also coached in Armenia, where he won the league title with Pyunik Yerevan and coached the Armenia national team.
