= El Durazno, O'Higgins =

Coordinates: 34°09′09″S 71°21′16″W

El Durazno is a Chilean village located in Las Cabras commune, O'Higgins Region southeast of Graneros.
