= Francisco Silva (Mexican footballer) =

Mexican footballer (born 1983)

Francisco Silva Flores (born 16 March 1983) is a Mexican former professional footballer who played as a midfielder.
