= Las Cabras, Chile =

Las Cabras
- Commune & Town
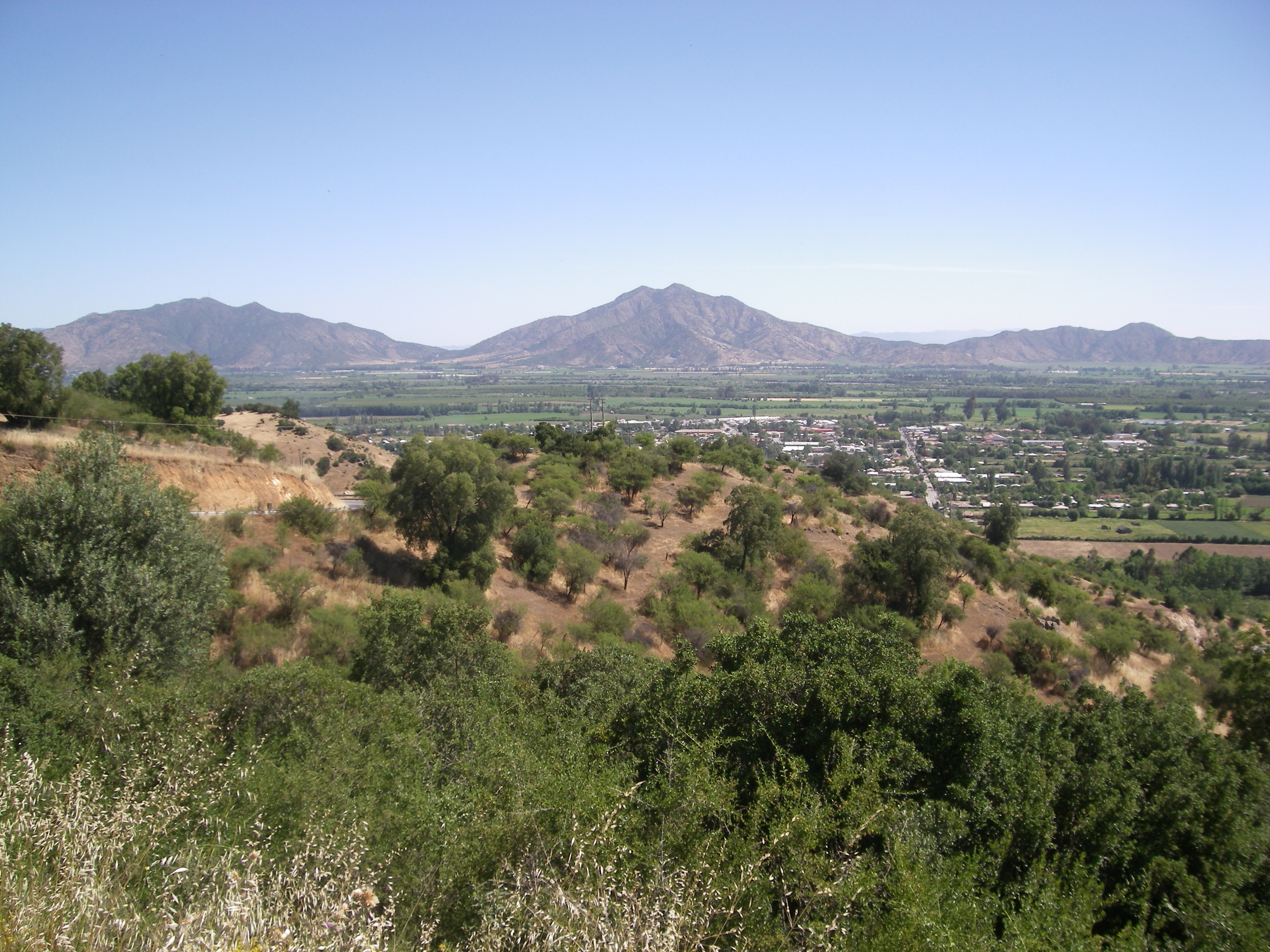
- Las Cabras from the surrounding hills

- Map of Las Cabras commune in the O'Higgins Region Location in Chile
- Coordinates (city): 34°17′30″S 71°18′35″W
- Country: Chile
- Region: O'Higgins Region
- Province: Cachapoal Province

Government
  - Type: Municipality

Area
  - Total: 749.2 km^{2} (289.3 sq mi)
- Elevation: 126 m (413 ft)

Population (2012 Census)
  - Total: 21,798
  - Density: 29.10/km^{2} (75.36/sq mi)
  - Urban: 7,548
  - Rural: 12,694

Sex
  - Men: 10,621
  - Women: 9,621
- Time zone: UTC-4 (CLT)
  - Summer (DST): UTC-3 (CLST)
- Area code: (+56) 72
- Website: www.lascabrasmunicipalidad.cl

Las Cabras is a Chilean commune and city in Cachapoal Province, O'Higgins Region. This commune is known for agriculture and handcrafts. The commune's name comes from the many goats (cabras, in Spanish) that used to be in the mountains.

== Demographics ==
According to the 2002 census of the National Statistics Institute, Las Cabras spans an area of 749.2 km^{2} (289 sq mi) and has 20,242 inhabitants (10,621 men and 9,621 women). Of these, 7,548 (37.3%) lived in urban areas and 12,694 (62.7%) in rural areas. The population grew by 14.1% (2,504 persons) between the 1992 and 2002 censuses.

== Administration ==
As a commune, Las Cabras is a third-level administrative division of Chile administered by a municipal council, headed by an alcalde who is directly elected every four years.

Within the electoral divisions of Chile, Las Cabras is represented in the Chamber of Deputies by Alejandra Sepúlveda (PRI) and Javier Macaya (UDI) as part of the 34th electoral district, together with San Fernando, Chimbarongo, San Vicente, Peumo and Pichidegua. The commune is represented in the Senate by Andrés Chadwick Piñera (UDI) and Juan Pablo Letelier Morel (PS) as part of the 9th senatorial constituency (O'Higgins Region).

== Localities ==
- El Durazno
