= Lolol =

- Town
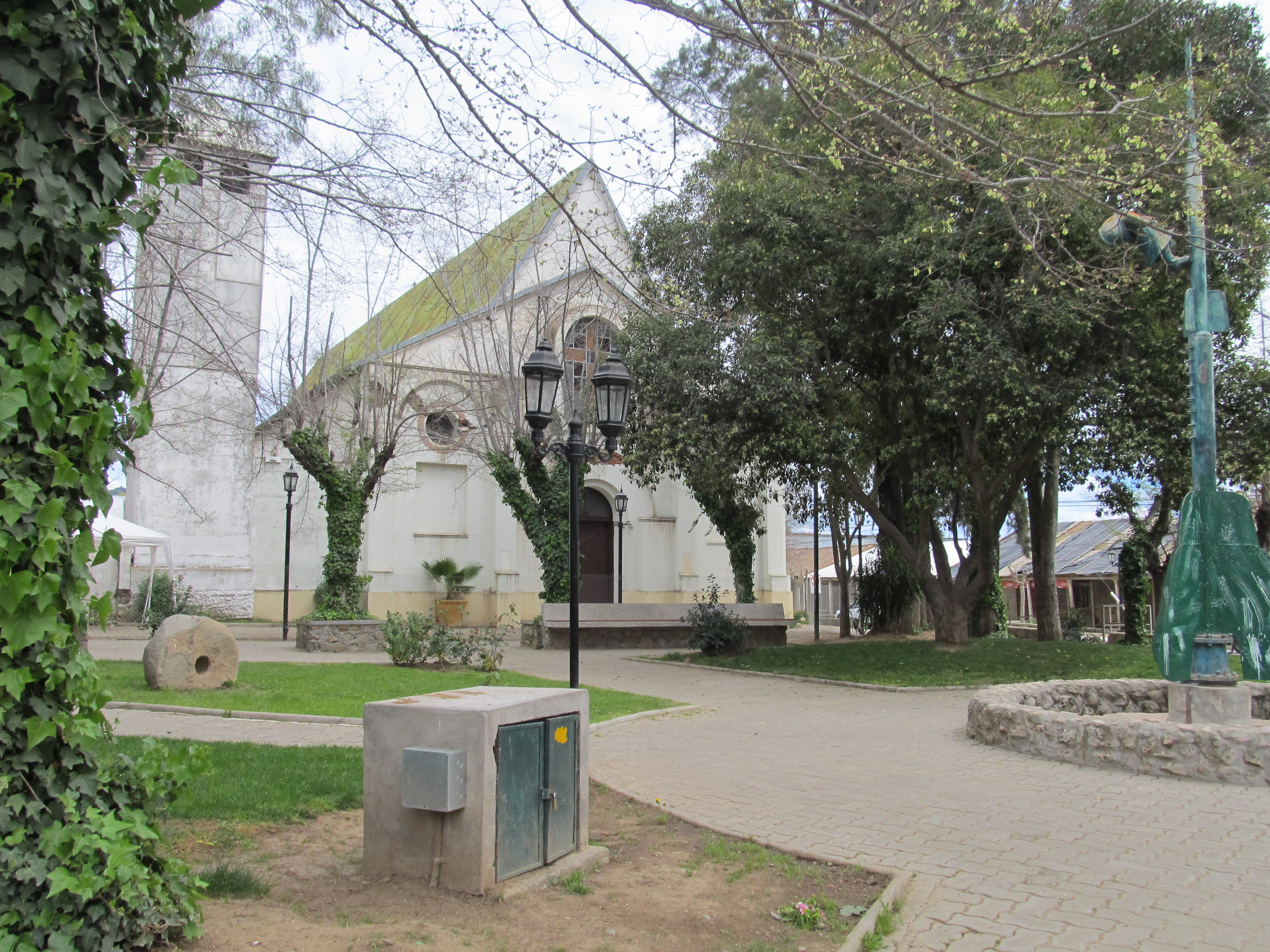
- View of historical center

- Coat of arms Location of the commune of Lolol in the O'Higgins Region Location in Chile
- Coordinates (city): 34°43′34″S 71°38′41″W
- Country: Chile
- Region: (O'Higgins Region) O'Higgins
- Province: (Colchagua Province) Colchagua

Government
  - Type: Municipality
  - Alcalde: José Román Chávez

Area
  - Total: 596.9 km^{2} (230.5 sq mi)
- Elevation: 92 m (302 ft)

Population (2012 Census)
  - Total: 6,630
  - Density: 11.1/km^{2} (28.8/sq mi)
  - Urban: 2,118
  - Rural: 4,073

Sex
  - Men: 3,235
  - Women: 2,956
- Time zone: UTC-4 (CLT)
  - Summer (DST): UTC-3 (CLST)
- Area code: (+56) 72
- Website: Municipality of Lolol

Lolol (Mapudungun: "land of crabs and holes"; Spanish pronunciation: [loˈlol]) is a Chilean commune and town in Colchagua Province, O'Higgins Region.

== History ==
During the 17th century, several haciendas were created throughout the Colchagua Valley; they were great lands which the king of Spain granted to his conquistadores. After Chilean independence in 1818, several mansions were created in the Lolol area, some of which are still standing today, and are part of the local tourism.

From the late 19th century, and until the mid-20th century, the Hacienda Lolol and Hacienda Santa Teresa de Quiahue (located southwest of Lolol) were an important part of the local economy.

In 2003, central Lolol was declared to be a National Monument of Chile, in the category of Typical and Picturesque Zone, owing to the conservation of its colonial structures, culture, and traditions.

The town was the subject of nationwide press coverage in July 2012, when long-time resident Juan Duarte and Santiago-born tourist María José Reyes were murdered and beheaded by Óscar López, a local pawn shop owner, who was subsequently shot by police.

== Demographics ==
According to the 2002 census of the National Statistics Institute, Lolol spans an area of 596.9 km^{2} (230 sq mi) and has 6,191 inhabitants (3,235 men and 2,956 women). Of these, 2,118 (34.2%) lived in urban areas and 4,073 (65.8%) in rural areas. The population grew by 4.2% (247 persons) between the 1992 and 2002 censuses.

== Administration ==
As a commune, Lolol is a third-level administrative division of Chile administered by a municipal council, headed by an alcalde who is directly elected every four years. The 2021-2024 mayor is José Román Chávez.

== Tourism ==
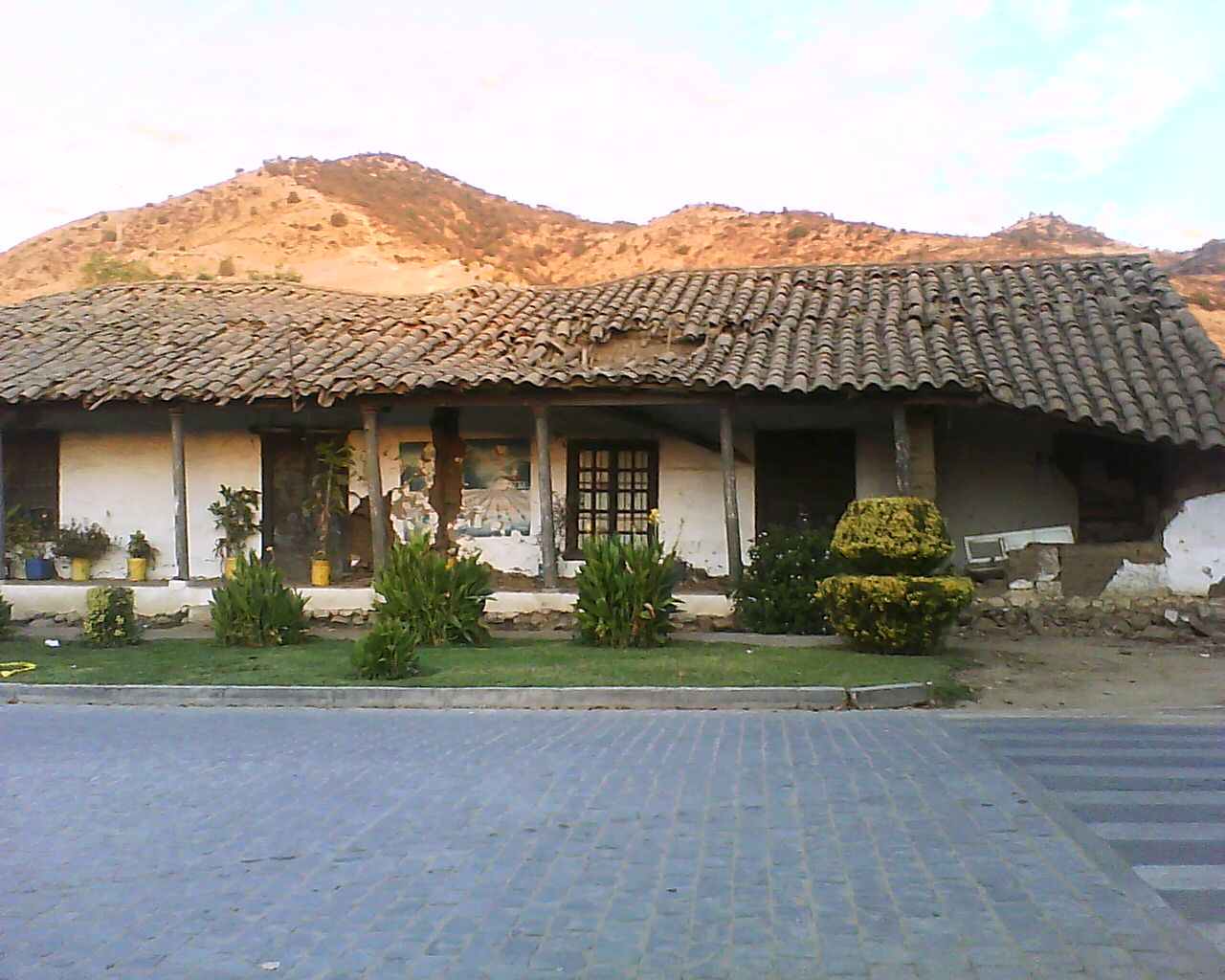
Several houses in the historical center of Lolol were damaged following the 2010 earthquake.

The most important part of the town of Lolol is the historical center, where the Iglesia de la Santísima Natividad de la Virgen de la Merced (Church of the Holy Nativity of Our Lady of Mercy) is located. The church has a painting of Chilean painter Alberto Valenzuela Llanos, a portrait of the appearance of the Virgin of Mercy to King James I of Spain.

Lolol is known as "Tierra Huasa" (Country Land); traditional events such as rodeos, Trilla a yegua suelta, Carreras a la Chilena, among others, take place in the town. In the local medialuna, besides the rodeos, massive events are also performed because of its public capacity.

=== Santa Teresa de Quiahue ===
The Santa Teresa de Quiahue area is located southwest of Lolol, near to the border with Maule Region. Its principal productions as a hacienda were mostly based in the cultivation of wheat and wine grapes, and the rearing of sheep. The old casa patronal (manor house) of Santa Teresa de Quiahue is one of the main attractions; it is the property of Tomás Correa Hogg, grandson of Aliro Correa Fuenzalida, who was its owner since the late 19th century. The casa patronal was constructed at a height due to the regular flooding of Estero Quichua. The old part of the building suffered great damage after the earthquake of 27 February 2010.

=== Hacienda de Lolol ===
Hacienda Lolol is located 75 kilometres (47 mi) from San Fernando, and 25 kilometres (16 mi) from Santa Cruz, through the I-72 route. The hacienda comprises lands used for agriculture and animal husbandry, an agricultural y Ganado, a reservoir of ten kilometers where mackerel fishing is common, known as the "Tranque de Lolol", and a four feet high monument near the dam erected to Saint Isidore the Laborer.

Dedicated to tourism, tourists to Hacienda Lolol may visit the place on horseback, and visit Casas patronales with lunches of typical Chilean food, accompanied by wines of the Colchagua Valley.

== Economy ==
In 2018, the number of companies registered in Lolol was 206. The Economic Complexity Index (ECI) in the same year was -0.59, while the economic activities with the highest Revealed Comparative Advantage (RCA) index were Production of Cereal Seeds, Legumes and Oilseeds (253.46), Cultivation of other Oilseeds (205.01) and Harvesting, Pruning, Tying and Plant Adaptation Work (132.38).

== Culture ==
=== Activities ===
The "Semana Lololina" takes place during the month of February in the town of Lolol. Nowadays, this week has lost many of its representative days such as the Festival of the Voice, Night of Acting, among others, floats, etc.

Every year, in the month of October, the Interregional Motorcyclist Meeting is held along the traditional Lolol-Pichilemu route, which brings together motorcycle lovers from the south-central part of the country.

== See also ==
- Murder of María José Reyes and Juan Duarte
