= Navidad, Chile =

Navidad
- Commune
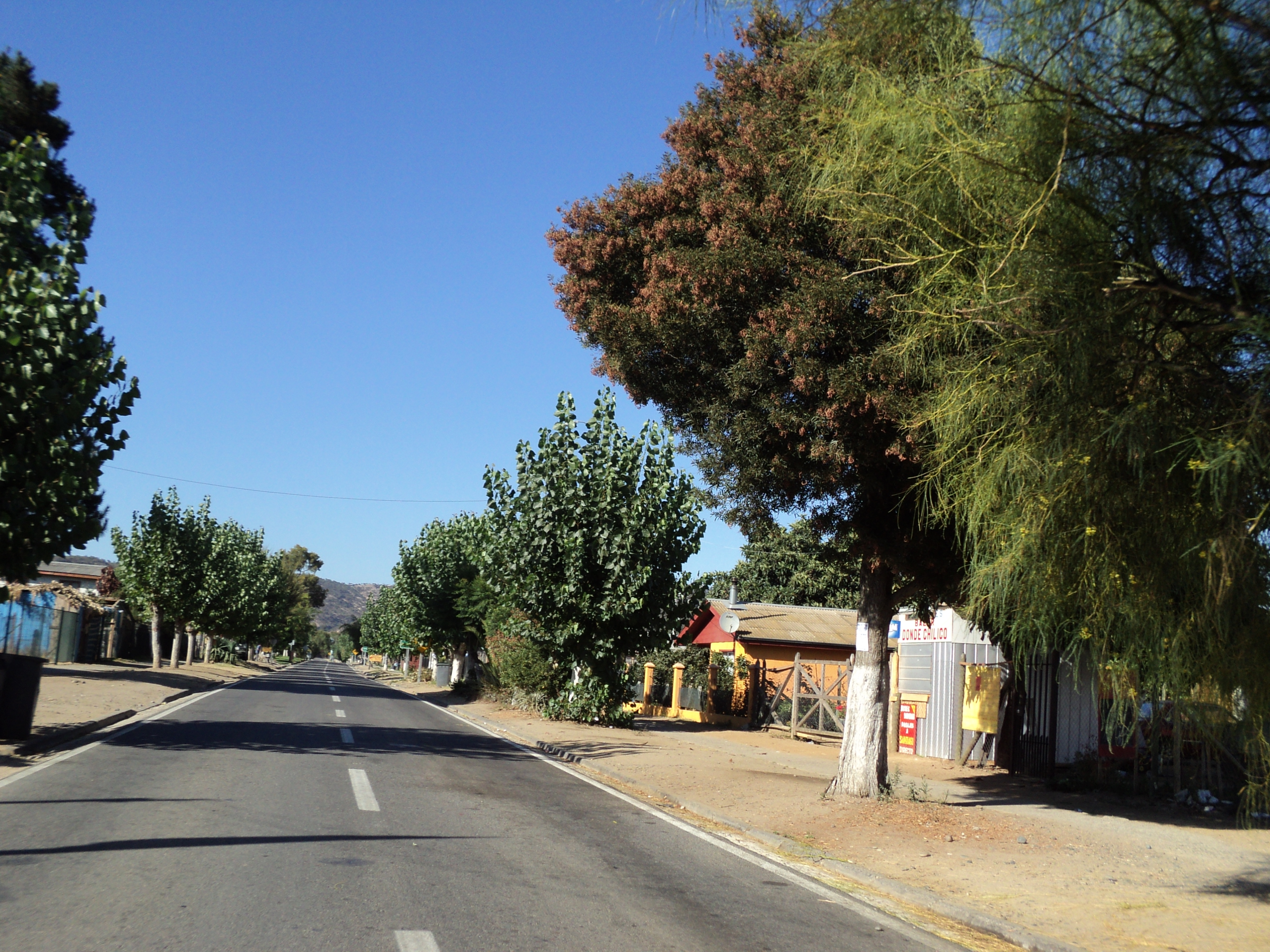

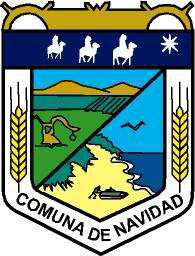
- Coat of arms Map of Navidad commune in O'Higgins Region Location in Chile
- Coordinates (city): 33°57′S 71°50′W
- Country: Chile
- Region: (O'Higgins Region) O'Higgins
- Province: (Cardenal Caro Province) Cardenal Caro

Government
  - Type: Municipality
  - Alcalde: Yanko Blumen Antivilo

Area
  - Total: 300.4 km^{2} (116.0 sq mi)
- Elevation: 24 m (79 ft)

Population (2012 Census)
  - Total: 5,324
  - Density: 17.72/km^{2} (45.90/sq mi)
  - Urban: 712
  - Rural: 4,710

Sex
  - Men: 2,878
  - Women: 2,544
- Time zone: UTC-4 (CLT)
  - Summer (DST): UTC-3 (CLST)
- Area code: (+56) 72
- Website: Municipality of Navidad

Navidad (Spanish pronunciation: [naβiˈðað]) is one of the six communes in Cardenal Caro Province, O'Higgins Region, Chile. It borders the commune of Santo Domingo (Valparaíso Region) and San Pedro (Santiago Metropolitan Region) in the north, the commune of Litueche to the east and south, and the Pacific Ocean to the west. The commune has approximately 20 kilometres of coastline.

== Demographics ==
According to the 2002 census of the Chilean National Statistics Institute, Navidad spans an area of 300.4 km^{2} (116 sq mi) and has 5,422 inhabitants (2,878 men and 2,544 women). Of these, 712 (13.1%) lived in urban areas and 4,710 (86.9%) in rural areas. The population fell by only 1 person between the 1992 and 2002 censuses.

== Geography ==
The landscape of the commune is predominantly plateau, rolling hills and ravines, common features of the central coastline of Chile. The Rapel River is the main water source, though there are also some small streams and lagoons, such as El Culenar.

Navidad has attracted visitors due to a geological feature, the Navidad Formation, marine rock strata containing fossilised marine life dating from the late Miocene to the early Pliocene eras, approximately 5 million years ago. The formations were studied by the English naturalist Charles Darwin in the 19th century. The French scientist and painter Claudio Gay was also commissioned by the Chilean government to study the area, as was the German geologist Rodolfo Philippi.

== Origin and history ==
The modern town and commune boundaries were established on September 28, 1936, with the municipality authorities placed in the town of Navidad, the largest in the commune. In 1585, the Franciscan friar Diego de Medellín, third bishop of Santiago, was concerned about the local people and wrote to the King of Spain about Navidad, Rapel, Matanzas and other settlements in the area, providing proof of the early origins of the name.

One tradition holds that one Christmas Eve in the sixteenth century, the first Franciscan friars came to the port of Matanzas and celebrated Christmas there, staying in the valley for several days. They called the place Navidad, the Spanish word for Christmas.

Other versions of the story claim that the name Navidad originated with the Jesuits and the Jesuit convent located in Bucalemu. Jesuits played an important role in the conversion and education of the native people, teaching not just religion but also various artisan skills.

None of these versions is confirmed.

== Administration ==
As a commune, Navidad is a third-level administrative division of Chile administered by a municipal council and led by an alcalde, who is directly elected every four years.

The 2021-2024 alcalde is Yanko Blumen Antivilo.

== Tourism ==
The climate of Navidad is Mediterranean, with rain from April to October and a dry summer. The coastline is very windy with big waves, making it a popular location for surfing.

Navidad has a strong farming tradition, and one interesting activity that can be observed here is the (Trilla a yegua suelta) festival, where mares are driven loose over harvested wheat to separate the grain from the chaff.

== Localities ==
Some of the localities located in Navidad: Rapel, Licancheu, Culenar, Navidad, Las Brisas, La Boca, Vega de La Boca, Matanzas, Pupuya, Pupuya Sur, El Fullingue, Centinela, El Manzano, Tumán, La Polcura, Valle negro, Puertecillo, Valle Hidango, El Manzano, San Vicente de Pucalán, Quiñecaben, La Aguada, Lagunillas, El Chorrillo, Potrero de San Rafael, La Patagûilla, El Maitén, Vega de Pupuya

== See also ==
- Puertecillo
- Chilean horse
- Matanzas, Chile
