= Federal Laws of 1826 =

The Federal Laws of 1826, collectively and incorrectly referred to as the Constitution of 1826, were a federalist experiment carried out in Chile during the period of the Organization of the Republic, in the absence of a formally approved constitution.

== History ==
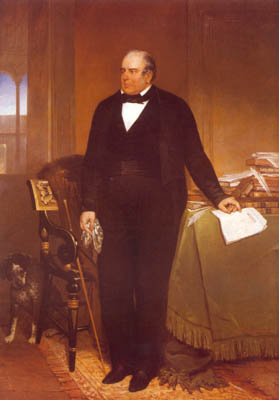
José Miguel Infante, promoter of the federal system

In the final days of the government of the Supreme Director Ramón Freire, on 4 July 1826, a Congress met with the aim of preparing a new constitution. Most members of Congress favored drafting a constitutional text based on classical federal principles. The principal promoter of the federal system was José Miguel Infante.

Manuel Blanco Encalada took office as president on 6 July, two days after the first session of Congress. While the work required for drafting the new Constitution was beginning to be organized, on 11 July of that same year a bill was approved stating that "the Republic of Chile is constituted under the federal system, whose Constitution will be presented to the people for their acceptance." Subsequently, other laws were approved to advance the federalization of the country (on 26, 27 and 29 July and 30 August), which established the popular election of governors, municipal councils, and parish priests, and implemented Provincial Assemblies with legislative authority.

The Federal Laws of 1826 divided the national territory into eight provinces: Coquimbo (equivalent to the former Intendancy of Coquimbo), Aconcagua, Santiago, and Colchagua (these three derived from the former Intendancy of Santiago), Maule, Concepción, Valdivia, and Chiloé (these four derived from the former Intendancy of Concepción).

Meanwhile, while preparing the constitutional draft, Congress followed federalist guidelines but, when specifying the form of the State (federal or unitary), it was unable to adopt a decision, suspending its sessions in May 1827—apparently in order to consult the provinces on the matter.

During the congressional recess, strong opposition to federalism emerged in Chile, and the measures taken to establish a federal system had to be set aside. Consequently, in August 1827, during the government of Francisco Antonio Pinto, a law was enacted suspending the application of the laws that had established federalism in Chile. On the other hand, these laws did not at any time mention the religion to be professed.
