= Peralillo =

- Town and Commune
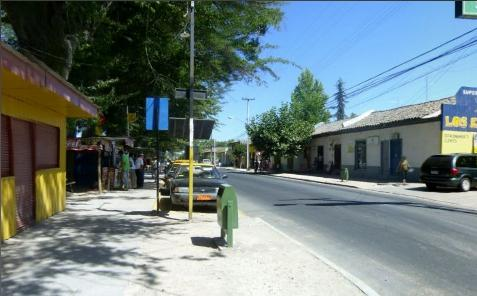

- Map of Peralillo commune in O'Higgins Region Location in Chile
- Coordinates (city): 34°29′15″S 71°29′30″W
- Country: Chile
- Region: (O'Higgins Region) O'Higgins
- Province: (Colchagua Province) Colchagua

Government
  - Type: Municipality
  - Alcalde: Claudio Cumsille

Area
  - Total: 282.6 km^{2} (109.1 sq mi)
- Elevation: 125 m (410 ft)

Population (2012 Census)
  - Total: 10,682
  - Density: 37.80/km^{2} (97.90/sq mi)
  - Urban: 5,882
  - Rural: 3,847

Sex
  - Men: 5,007
  - Women: 4,722
- Time zone: UTC-4 (CLT)
  - Summer (DST): UTC-3 (CLST)
- Area code: 56 + 72
- Website: Municipality of Peralillo

Peralillo is a Chilean town and commune in Colchagua Province, O'Higgins Region.

== Demographics ==
According to the 2002 census of the National Statistics Institute, Peralillo spans an area of 282.6 km^{2} (109 sq mi) and has 9,729 inhabitants (5,007 men and 4,722 women). Of these, 5,882 (60.5%) lived in urban areas and 3,847 (39.5%) in rural areas. The population grew by 6.4% (585 persons) between the 1992 and 2002 censuses.

== Administration ==
As a commune, Peralillo is a third-level administrative division of Chile administered by a municipal council, headed by an alcalde who is directly elected every four years. The 2021-2024 mayor is Claudio Cumsille.
