= Pumanque =

- Commune
- Map of Pumanque commune in O'Higgins Region Location in Chile
- Coordinates (city): 34°36′S 71°40′W
- Country: Chile
- Region: (O'Higgins Region) O'Higgins
- Province: (Colchagua Province) Colchagua

Government
  - Type: Municipality
  - Alcalde: Gonzalo Baraona Bezanilla

Area
  - Total: 440.9 km^{2} (170.2 sq mi)
- Elevation: 93 m (305 ft)

Population (2012 Census)
  - Total: 3,242
  - Density: 7.353/km^{2} (19.04/sq mi)
  - Urban: 0
  - Rural: 3,442

Sex
  - Men: 1,793
  - Women: 1,649
- Time zone: UTC-4 (CLT)
  - Summer (DST): UTC-3 (CLST)
- Area code: (+56) 72
- Website: Municipality of Pumanque

Pumanque is a Chilean commune in Colchagua Province, O'Higgins Region.

== Demographics ==
According to the 2002 census of the National Statistics Institute, Pumanque spans an area of 440.9 km^{2} (170 sq mi) and has 3,442 inhabitants (1,793 men and 1,649 women), making the commune an entirely rural area. The population fell by 8.8% (331 persons) between the 1992 and 2002 censuses.

== Administration ==
As a commune, Pumanque is a third-level administrative division of Chile administered by a municipal council, headed by an alcalde who is directly elected every four years. The 2021-2024 mayor is Gonzalo Baraona Bezanilla.
