= Liceo San José del Carmen =

Coordinates: 34.52357°S 71.37256°W

- El Huique, Palmilla, Chile

Information
- Type: High school

Liceo San José del Carmen (English: San José del Carmen High School) is a Chilean high school located in the rural area of El Huique in Palmilla, Colchagua Province, Chile.
