= El Huique =

Coordinates: 34°31′S 71°20′W

- Village
- El Huique
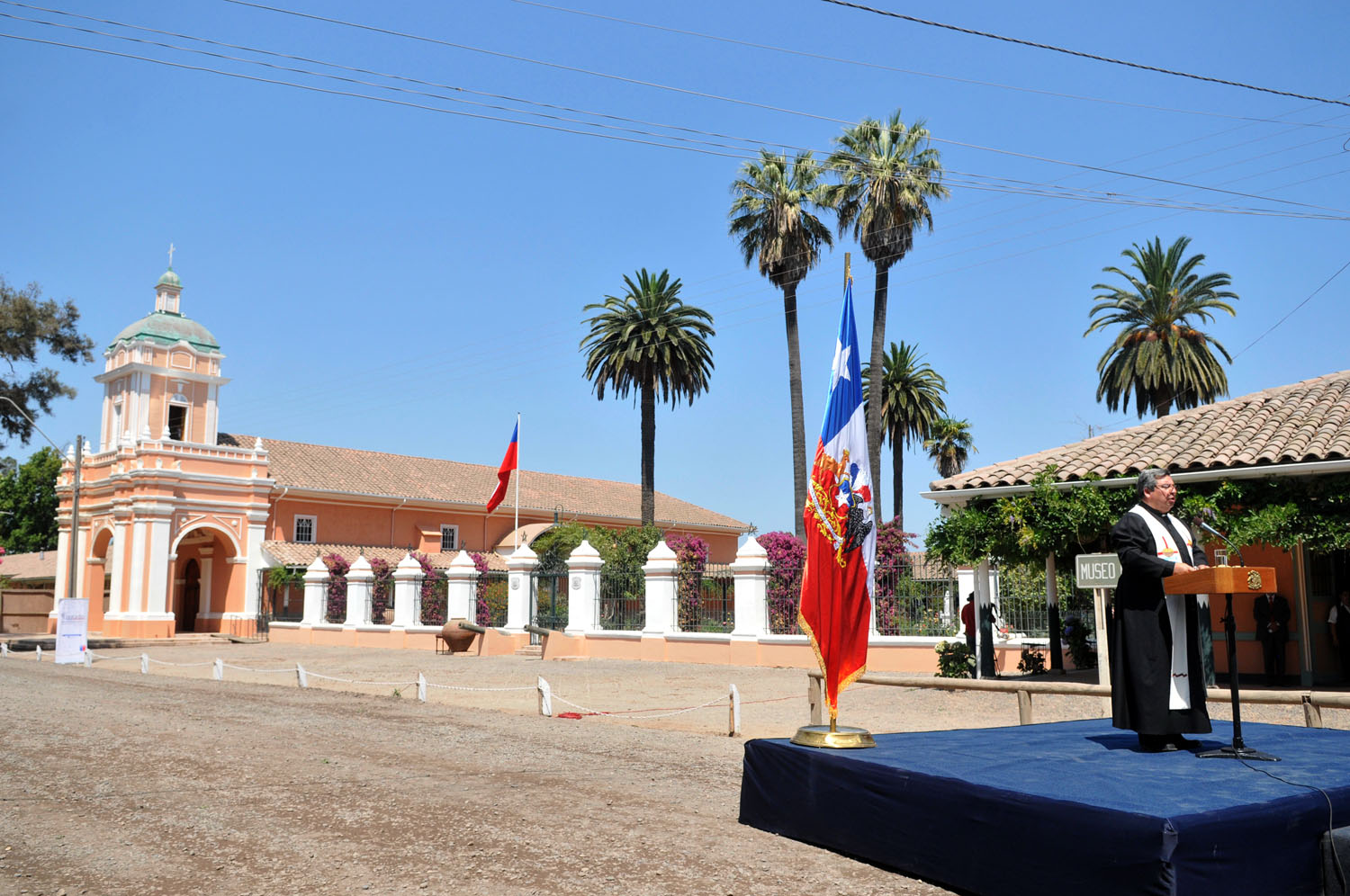
- Interactive map of El Huique
- Country: Chile
- Region: (O'Higgins Region) O'Higgins
- Province: (Colchagua Province) Colchagua
- Commune: Palmilla

El Huique is a Chilean village located north of Palmilla, Colchagua Province.
