= O'Higgins F.C. =

Chilean football club

O'Higgins
- Full name: O'Higgins Fútbol Club
- Nicknames: "El Capo de Provincia" (The Province's Boss) "O'Hi O'Hi" "La Celeste" (The Sky Blue)
- Short name: OHI
- Founded: April 7, 1955; 71 years ago as Club Deportivo O'Higgins
- Ground: Estadio El Teniente; Rancagua, Chile
- Capacity: 14,087
- Owner: Grupo Caliente
- Chairman: Matías Ahumada
- Manager: Lucas Bovaglio
- League: Liga de Primera
- 2025: Liga de Primera, 3rd of 16
- Website: www.ohigginsfc.cl
Home colours	Away colours	Third colours

Records

First match Unión Española 2–0 O'Higgins (Santiago, Chile; 8 May 1955)

First win in Campeonato Nacional O'Higgins 3–2 Ferrobádminton (Rancagua, Chile; 22 May 1955)

Biggest win in Campeonato Nacional O'Higgins 7–1 Fernández Vial (Rancagua, Chile; 13 May 1990)

Biggest defeat in Campeonato Nacional Cobreloa 8–1 O'Higgins (Calama, Chile; 4 September 1994) Universidad de Chile 8–1 O'Higgins (Santiago, Chile; 24 January 2016)

Biggest win in Copa Chile O'Higgins 7–0 San Antonio Unido (Rancagua, Chile; 10 October 2012)

Biggest defeat in Copa Chile Cobreloa 10–0 O'Higgins (Calama, Chile; 25 March 1979)

Biggest win in international competitions O'Higgins 6–0 Deportivo Galicia (Rancagua, Chile; 25 March 1979)

Biggest defeat in international competitions Bolívar 5–1 O'Higgins (La Paz, Bolivia; 1 April 1984)

O'Higgins Fútbol Club (Spanish: [oˈxiɣins ˈfuðβol ˈkluβ]), also known as O'Higgins de Rancagua, is a Chilean professional football club based in Rancagua, that currently plays in the Liga de Primera. The club's home stadium is Estadio El Teniente, opened in 1945 and renovated for the 2015 Copa América, which was hosted by Chile.

Founded in 1955, the club was named in honor of the country's founding father and supreme director Bernardo O'Higgins, after the merger of the clubs O'Higgins Braden and América de Rancagua. O'Higgins has won two Primera B titles, and in 2013 they won their first top-flight championship against Universidad Católica, coached by Eduardo Berizzo; they later won the 2014 Supercopa de Chile on penalty kicks against Deportes Iquique.

== History ==
=== Establishment ===
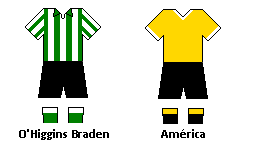

On 7 April 1955, after the merger of Rancagua's cross–town rival: O'Higgins Braden (that was born in 1954 from the merger between Braden and Instituto O'Higgins) and América de Rancagua, the club was founded thanks to Carlos Dittborn, the president of the Asociación Central de Football, who offered to put the name of the O'Higgins, which represents workers of Codelco in the city, under the name of Braden Copper; the name was also chosen in reference to the country's founding father and supreme director Bernardo O'Higgins, an important character of the Colonial Chile during the 1810s, who also identified with the city of Rancagua.

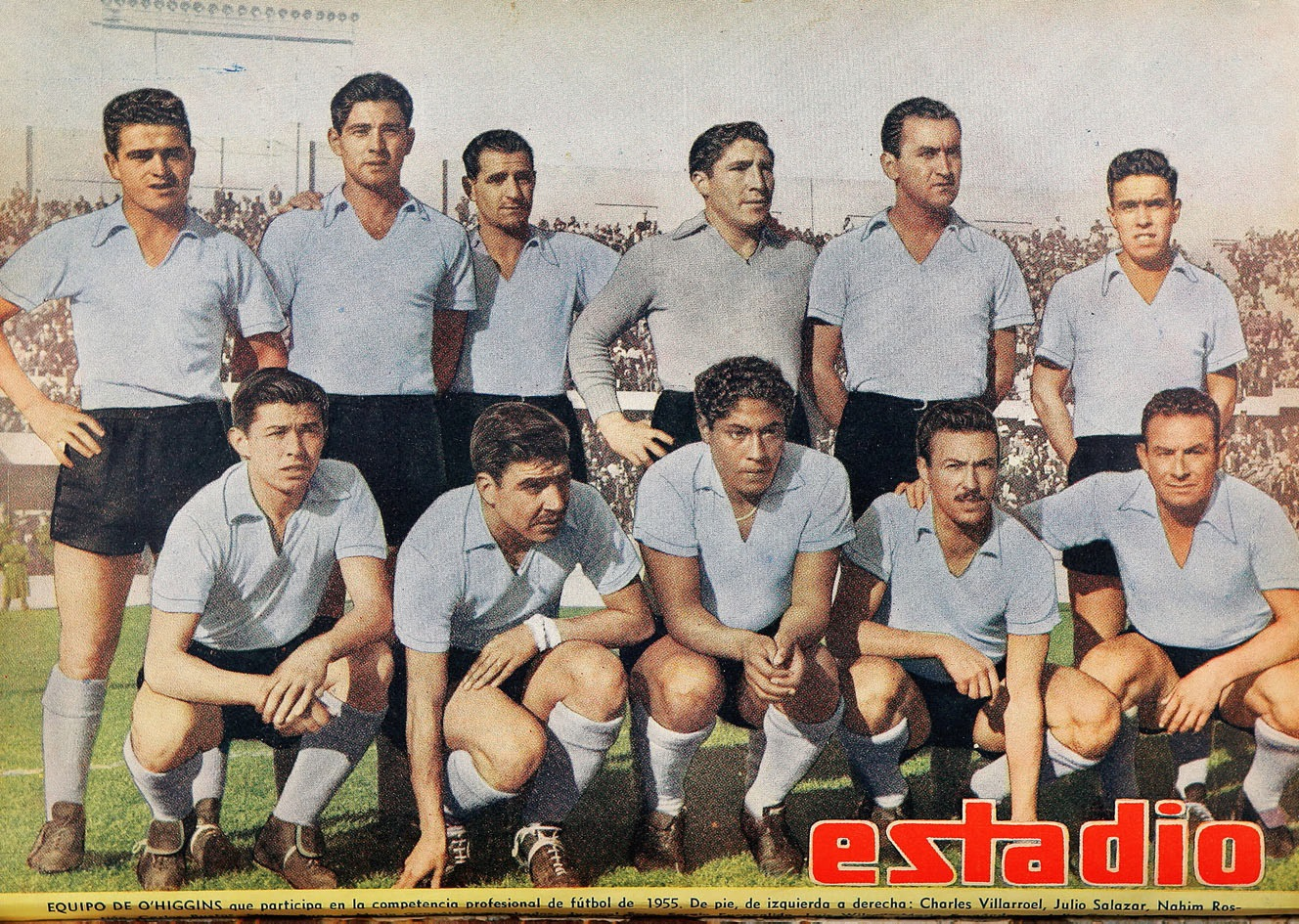
O'Higgins starting line-up in 1955.

The colors of the club were originally from the Instituto O'Higgins, which were red, blue, and white. However, the Football Federation of Chile prohibited using the colors of the national team, so the club directors decided that the uniform would be sky blue, based on Uruguay's uniform, earning then the nickname of La Celeste. The stadium was named Estadio Braden Copper Company after the name of the company from its opening until the 1962 FIFA World Cup, when the name was changed to its current name, Estadio El Teniente, based on the El Teniente mine.

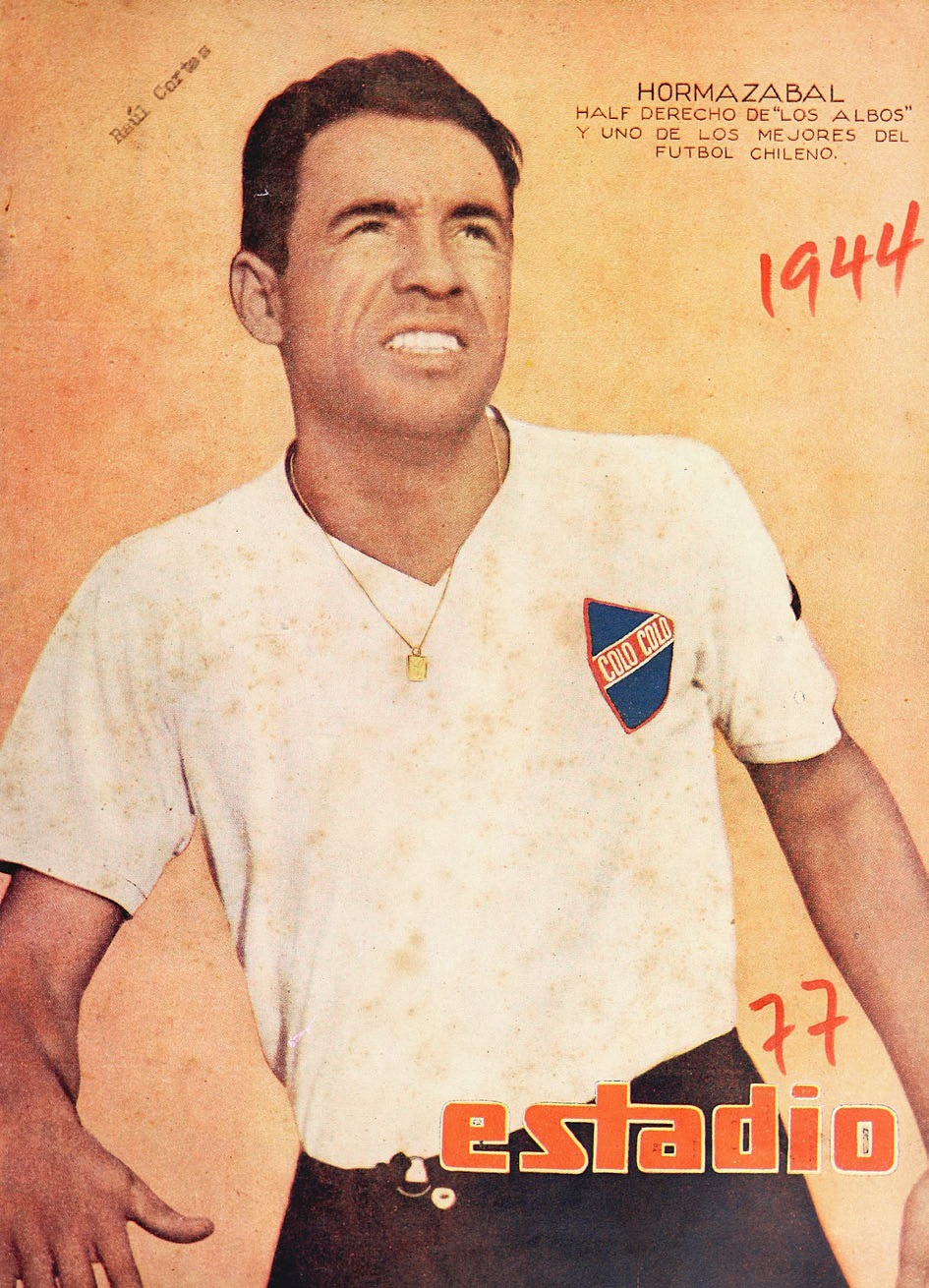
Francisco Hormazábal was the first head coach of the club in 1955.

On 21 April 1955, the Asociación Central de Football decided that the team would play in the Primera División for the next season, with the first president being Nicolás Abumohor and the first head coach being Francisco Hormazábal. Their first game in the Campeonato Nacional was a 2–0 loss to Unión Española on 8 May 1955. Their first win came on 22 May of that same year, a 3–2 home victory against Ferrobádminton. In their first league tournament, the club finished ninth in the table, which put them in the relegation play-offs, where they earned their permanence in the top tier.

=== First seasons, relegations, and comebacks ===
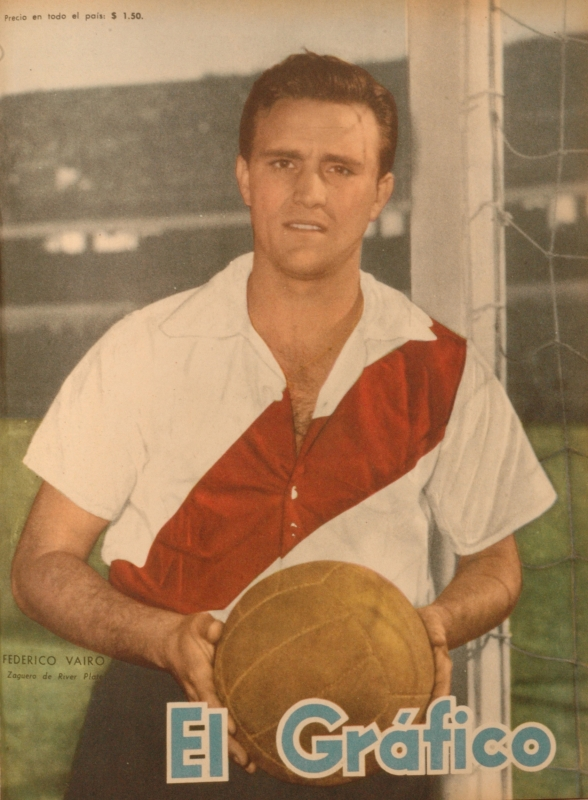
The Argentine player Federico Vairo is one of the club's most important players.

The first great season of the club was in the 1959 season, where the club finished in fourth place under the orders of Argentine coach José Salerno, only four points behind league champion Universidad de Chile and behind third-placed team Santiago Wanderers on goal difference, making this one of its most successful Primera División campaigns, with José Benito Ríos as the key player and top scorer of the tournament with 22 goals.

A few seasons later, the team was relegated to the Segunda División after a poor campaign in 1963. The next season, with the signings of the defender Federico Vairo and the attacking midfielder Mario Desiderio, both from the Argentine Primera División, the team returned to Primera División. In special, the performances of Vairo consecrated him as the best footballer in the club's history according to the supporters of Rancagua, who chose the Rosarian centre back with the honour in 1999. Since the promotion in 1964, the club had average seasons, finishing mid-table, despite suffering the departures of Federico Vairo and Mario Desiderio to the Colombian side Deportivo Cali in 1966.

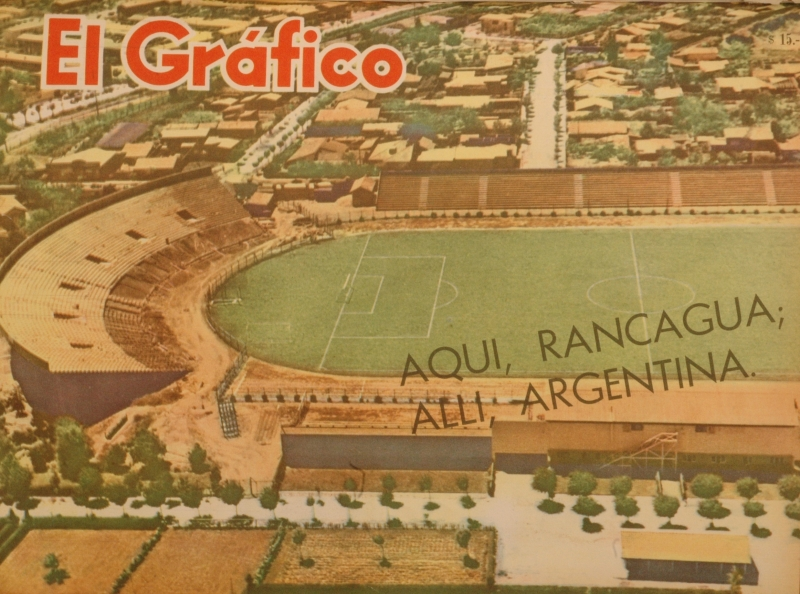
The Estadio El Teniente was a host stadium for the 1962 FIFA World Cup.

In the 1973 season, under the orders of the coaches Luis Vera and Jorge Aretio, O'Higgins and Huachipato both finished in third place behind of Unión Española and Colo-Colo, its best result since the 1959 season. In the 1975 season, the club was relegated again, but returned for the 1977 season after finishing runner up of the 1976 Primera B. After a notable 1978 tournament, where the team finished third in the league with Luis Santibáñez as head coach, it achieved qualification to the following edition of the Copa Libertadores by winning the Liguilla Pre-Libertadores, in which they achieved their biggest win for an international contest against Deportivo Galicia, beating the Venezuelan side 6–0 at El Teniente, and also achieved its most important away win for an international tournament, winning 1–0 in Valencia to the same Galicia. In the following season the club reached the fifth place in the league with Santibáñez as head coach again, qualifying to the 1980 Copa Libertadores via the Libertadores Liguilla after a notable unbeaten run of five matches, and winning the Liguilla over another strongers clubs, Universidad de Chile, Cobreloa and Unión Española.

=== Copa Libertadores appearances, Copa Chile finals ===

O'Higgins starting line-up in 1980 Copa Libertadores v. Sol de América.

While managing indifferent league form in the early 1980s, the club had its first South American success in the form of the Copa Libertadores. In the 1980 edition, O'Higgins reached the semi-finals, after overcoming the group stage where they faced Colo-Colo, Cerro Porteño and Sol de América, only by goal difference, since all the teams had obtained 6 points (2 wins, 2 draws, 2 losses), they managed to advance to the semi-finals of the competition for the first time. Key players such as Miguel Ángel Neira (the team's top scorer with 3 goals in the tournament), Juvenal Vargas, Juan Rogelio Núñez, the Uruguayans Nelson Acosta and Washington Olivera, the Argentine goalkeeper Miguel Leyes and the defender with participations in the Chilean national team René Serrano were the backbone of the great participation of the sky-blue team. In the second phase they faced Club Nacional de Football and Club Olimpia, losing in all four games without being able to score goals in the definition phase. This is the best historical participation of the club in the most prestigious continental tournament.

During the 1984 edition of the Libertadores, the club finished last in its group, which was made up of fellow Chileans Universidad Católica, and Bolivian clubs Bolivar and Blooming. In the league, the team had poor campaigns from 1981 to 1983, although the club defeated Colo-Colo 6–1 in the 1983 season, and reached their first Copa Chile final, where it lost to Universidad Catolica in a liguilla group.

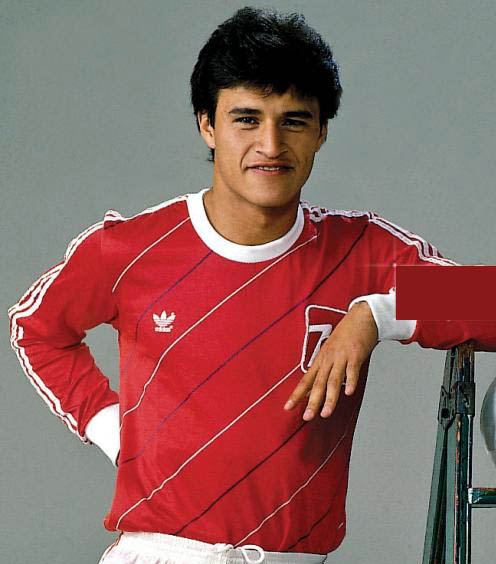
Claudio Borghi, who was 1986 FIFA World Cup champion, played for the club in 1995.

After financial problems with Codelco, the company owner of the club, the club was relegated to the Primera B in the 1985 season, with the possibility of being relegated to the Tercera División for another controversy related to Codelco. The next season, the club won the regular season and qualified to the promotion playoffs, but failed to win the group that consisted of 6 teams. In the 1987 season, with the defenders Gabriel Mendoza and Atilio Marchioni as key players, the club returned to the Primera División, after an exciting final with Lota Schwager at Talca.

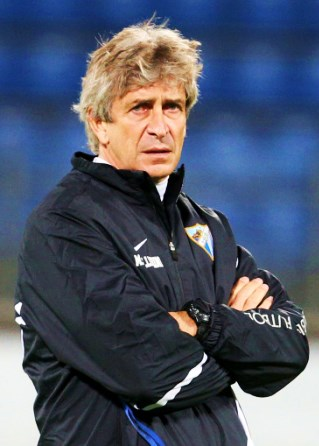
Manuel Pellegrini, coach of the club in 1992.

Years later, the club hired Manuel Pellegrini as coach for the 1992 Copa CONMEBOL, in which they were eliminated by Argentine side Gimnasia de La Plata in the first round, in that occasion with players like Claudio Borghi, who won the 1986 FIFA World Cup with Argentina, the talented playmaker Jaime Riveros and the striker Gustavo De Luca, one of the most prolific goalscorers in Chilean football during the 1990s. In the 1992 season the club finished 6th in the league's aggregate table, giving them an opportunity to qualify for the 1993 Copa Libertadores via the Liguilla, but the club eventually failed to qualify for continental competitions after losing to U Catolica. Midway through the 1993 season, Pellegrini left to manage U de Chile.

In the 1994 season, under the orders of Roberto Hernández, O'Higgins reached the Copa Chile finals, after beating Universidad de Chile 2–1 at the Estadio Nacional in the semi-finals. However, in the final against Colo-Colo, the club lost on penalties, whilst for the Primera División tournament, the Rancaguan side finished in the third place of the table, therefore missing out on achieving Copa Libertadores qualification. The next season, O'Higgins failed to qualify to the Libertadores Liguilla, ending only in the sixth position of the Primera División tournament.

=== The Instability: 1996–2004 ===
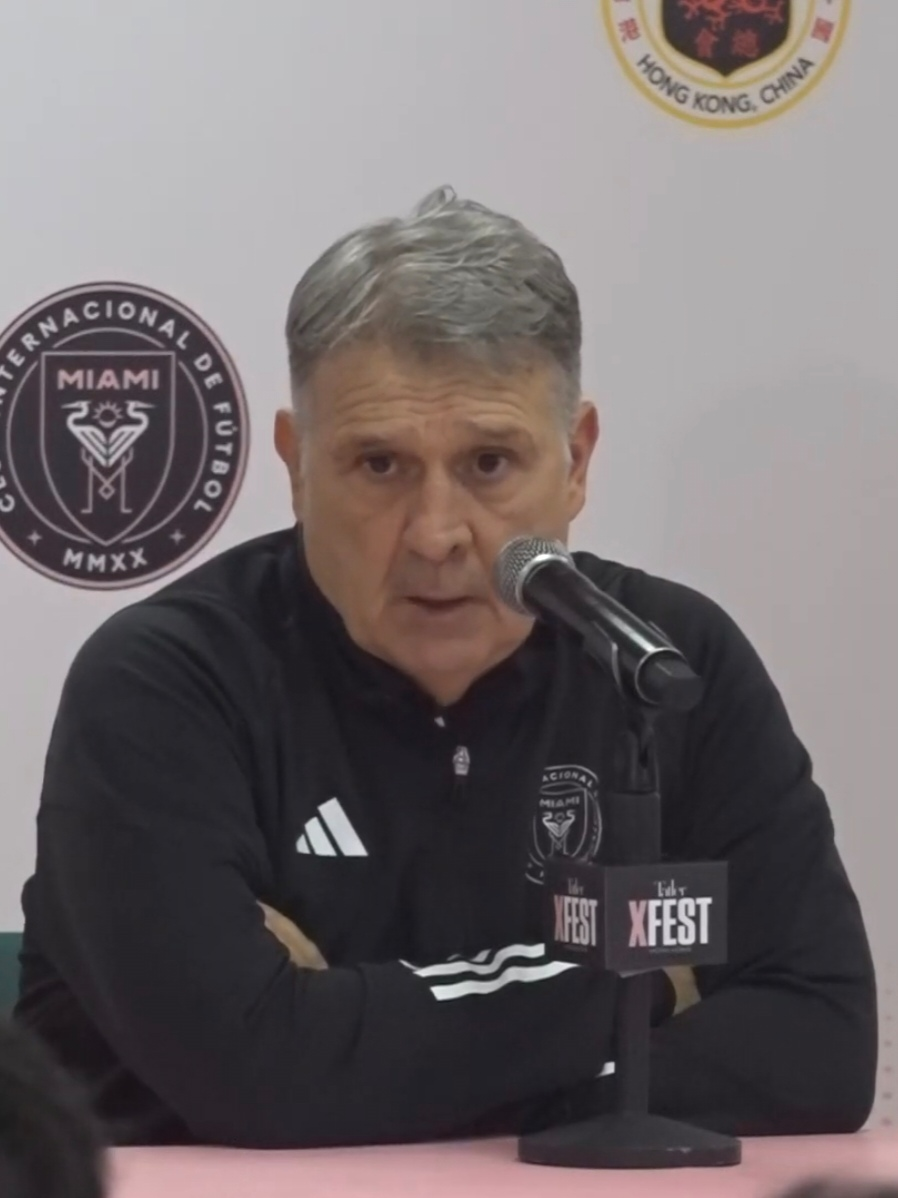
Gerardo Martino played in the club in the year 1996.

In the 1996 season, the club signed great players, such as midfielder Clarence Acuña, Argentine playmaker Gerardo Martino, and strikers Carlos Poblete and Ariel Cozzoni. However, the team got relegated to the Primera B, after finishing last in the table. In 1997, an Apertura and Clausura format was used, which made it difficult to achieve promotion since it wasn't used in the Clausura. Although O'Higgins had great campaigns that season, finishing in the top 4 of both tournaments, it failed to achieve promotion.

Two years later, under the orders of René Serrano, the team achieved promotion to the First Division again. In 1999, the Rancagua club finished in tenth place, in which Mario Núñez and Jaime González also became the most successful goalscorer pair in Chilean football with 57 goals between both strikers. In the 2001 season, with financial problems and a poor season, it returned to the Primera B, having gone through three managers: Guillermo Páez, Rubén Espinoza, and Luis Droguett. Luis Droguett almost saved the club from being relegated, including a victory against Colo-Colo, but ultimately it was not enough to stay in the top tier.

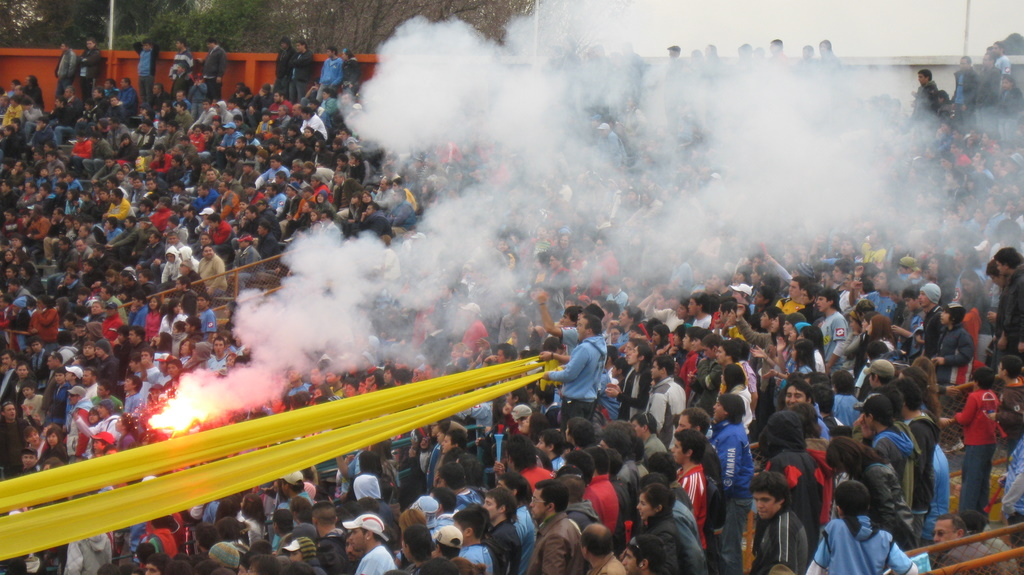
Trinchera Celeste, the barra brava of the club, was founded in 2002.

In 2002, under Luis Droguett's orders, the club had a decent season in the second tier but wasn't fighting for the promotion playoffs. For the 2003 season, Droguett was replaced by Eduardo Salas. The economic problems in the club were evident again, and for the most part the club used youth players. These problems resulted in the club's failure to be promoted again, although they were in the promotion spots (top 2 of table) until a 2–0 loss with Everton, which moved the club to a fourth-place finish. The 2004 season was very similar to the previous season; although the club had a very promising start, it failed to reach the Primera División again after being defeated 3–0 by Deportes Melipilla, under the orders of the Paraguayan head coach Sergio Nichiporuk, who had replaced Eduardo Salas in June.

Despite the sports failure, the club was also experiencing hard financial problems, mainly because of Codelco but also because of irregularities in the board. However, in December 2004, it was reported that the Anfp's former president and entrepreneur Ricardo Abumohor would buy the team to fix the situation.

=== Abumohor takeover, Garcés and Sampaoli era ===
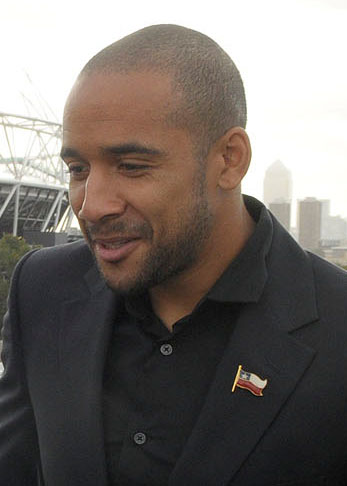
Jean Beausejour, one of the most important players of the team in their last seasons.

For the 2005 season, ex-goalkeeper Nelson Cossio became the club's new manager. However, the club started to distance itself from the promotion places after a run of six winless matches. After a draw to Deportes Copiapó in August, Cossio was sacked. Shortly after Cossio was sacked, the club was purchased by Anfp's former president, Ricardo Abumohor, who bought the team from Codelco, having the Primera B title as the principal objective for the return to the Primera División. He brought in manager Gerardo Silva as Cossio's replacement, and the club eventually achieved that long awaited objective, defeating Deportes Melipilla 4–3 on aggregate for the promotion with Hugo Brizuela and Mario Núñez as the key players of the success.

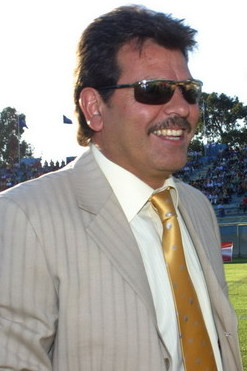
Jorge Garcés achieved the semi-finals in 2006.

The next season, the club signed Jorge Garcés as coach, qualifying for the playoffs of the Torneo Clausura, where they beat Coquimbo Unido in the quarter finals and were eliminated by Audax Italiano in the semi-finals with controversial decisions made by referee Rubén Selman. In the 2007 season, O'Higgins finished twelfth in the Apertura table and were eliminated by Colo-Colo during the playoffs for the Clausura. The first leg ended in a 5–0 precipitous loss at Rancagua; this result basically sealed the series for the whites with the second leg at Santiago, which finished 1–1, but 6–1 in Colo-Colo's favor on global.

In December 2007, after the departure of Jorge Garcés to Deportes Concepción, the club reached an agreement with Jorge Sampaoli of Sporting Cristal. Sampaoli had a successful season during the Apertura 2008, with talented players like Jean Beausejour and Carlos Carmona, finishing third in the league table but being eliminated in the playoff quarter-finals by Universidad de Chile. In the Clausura, it had a similar season, and the team was eliminated by Palestino in the quarter-finals. In 2009, Sampaoli was fired after a game with Universidad de Concepción, due to failing to qualify for the Clausura play-offs because of a 15th-placed league finish, and having suffered a 6–1 defeat with Unión Española for the Apertura play-off quarter-finals at Estadio Santa Laura.

The board signed Roberto Hernández again as coach for the 2010 season. Hernandez brought the team into the top 5 places into the table during the first half of the season, but after the FIFA World Cup break he started to have poor results, so he was fired and Marco Antonio Figueroa arrived as a replacement. The most important achievements of Figueroa's period was beating Universidad de Chile 1–0 at the Estadio Nacional and Colo-Colo 2–1; however the team finished in a mediocre 10th place and Figueroa left the club for Mexican club Veracruz.

The club's board signed up Ivo Basay to face the 2011 season, where the club finished fifth in the Apertura league table and qualified to the play-offs, with Fernando De la Fuente and Enzo Gutiérrez as key players. In the play-offs stage, O'Higgins beat Palestino, reaching the semi-finals against Universidad de Chile, in which they were defeated 8–1 on aggregate. Basay was sacked in the 2011 Clausura, with poor results and the 7–1 loss against U de Chile in the Apertura semi-finals being the deciding factors.

=== Eduardo Berizzo era: First league and supercopa title ===
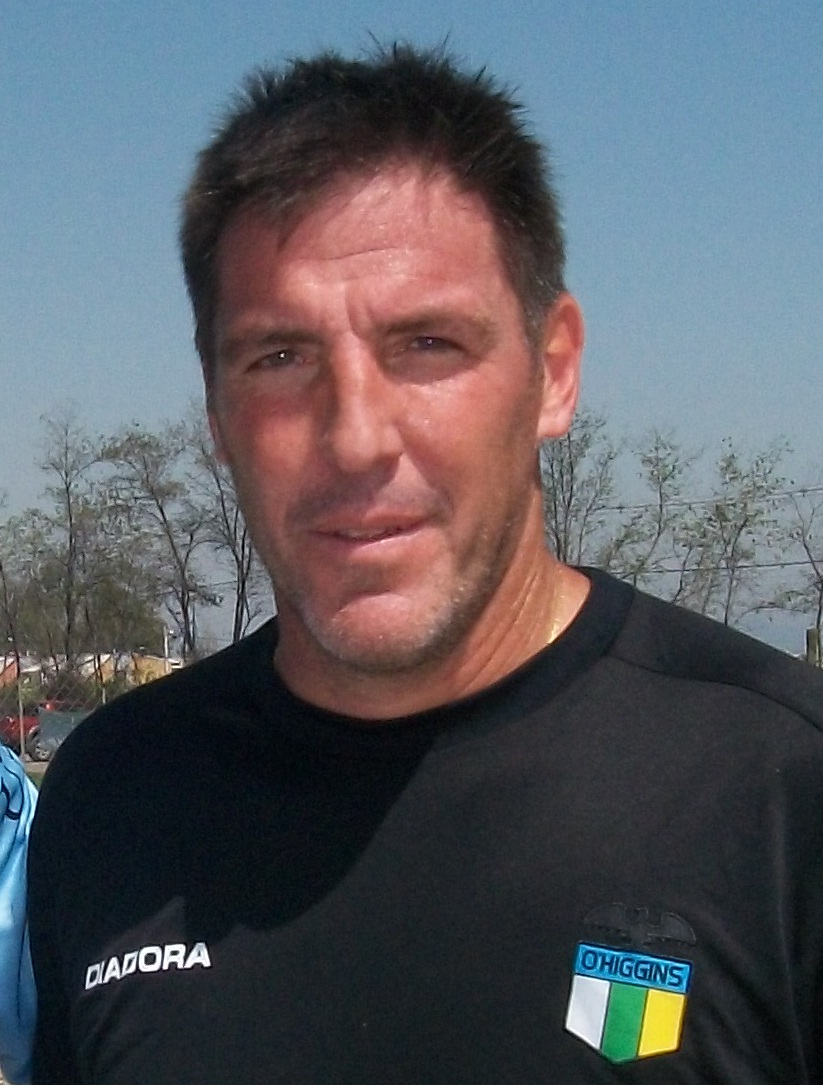
Eduardo Berizzo, the most successful manager of the club

In December 2011, the club's board signed manager Eduardo Berizzo for the 2012 season. The year started of abrupt form with Fernando De la Fuente's departure after a strong discussion with new head coach Berizzo and his assistant, Roberto Bonano. It was then confirmed that the player would be loaned to Deportes La Serena, which meant that O'Higgins were losing of this form one of the best defensive midfielders in Chilean football to face the Torneo de Apertura, given that De la Fuente had a great 2011 season.

However, the club's board surprised the public with the signings of Argentine attacking midfielder Ramón Fernández, who had previously been tempted by the country's powerhouse clubs: Colo-Colo and Universidad de Chile, the Paraguayan footballer Rodrigo Rojas, who played for River Plate, and finally defender Julio Barroso, who played for Boca Juniors and was champion of the 2005 U-20 World Cup with Argentina.

==== Berizzo's first season and first final ====
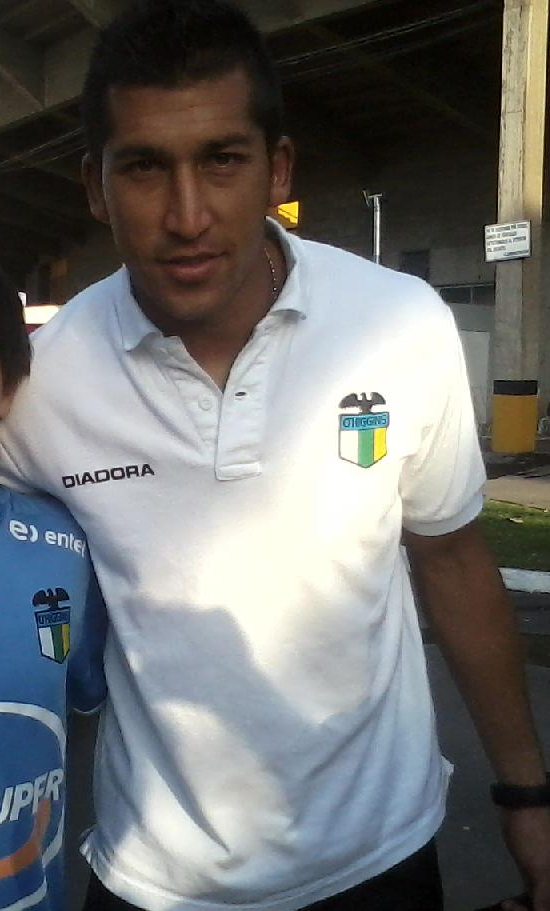
Luis Marín was the captain during the 2012 finals.

On 27 January 2012, Berizzo achieved his first competitive victory with the club in a league match against Antofagasta with a goal from new signing Ramón Fernández, narrowly losing the next match at the capital Santiago with Colo-Colo 1–0. On 25 February, the team achieved its most important victory against Universidad de Chile at home, a 3–0 victory with goals from Enzo Gutiérrez, Guillermo Suárez and Ramon Fernández, in where Luis Marín saved a penalty to keep a clean sheet, earning of this form the first place in the league table, which was lost when Universidad Católica defeated the team 2–1 on 11 March. Despite this loss, the team achieved four consecutive wins, with Julio Barroso and Rodrigo Rojas as the key players, a run that finished when Huachipato defeated the club 2–1 on 15 April. Despite the defeat at the city of Talcahuano, the team bounced back and beat Palestino 5–0 at home in the next match. The following week, a 1–0 away victory over Santiago Wanderers in Valparaíso gave the club qualification to the 2012 Copa Sudamericana, where they were eliminated by Cerro Porteño in the first stage 7–3 on aggregate.

The team qualified for the play-offs after a successful Apertura tournament, where the club finished second in the table, only under U. de Chile. The club had to begin the play-offs by facing Unión La Calera in the quarter-finals. In the first match at La Calera on 24 May, the team won 1–0 with a free kick scored by Ramón Fernández, who did not celebrate the goal as he was planning to leave the club at the conclusion of the season. In Rancagua for the second match, the club clinched a 3–2 victory, thanks to Enzo Gutiérrez, who scored an incredible bicycle kick that defeated keeper Lucas Giovini. In the semi-finals, the club faced Unión Española at Santiago in the first leg, where the club was defeated 1–0 at the Estadio Santa Laura, but won the second match 2–1 with goals of Luis Pedro Figueroa and Rodrigo Rojas, earning a spot in the finals for the first time in its history on the away goals rule, after the 2–2 aggregate score.

In the first leg of the finals against Universidad de Chile, O'Higgins beat "La U" at home 2–1 with goals of Rojas and the Argentine full back Alejandro López in a match known as La tarde de los paraguas felices because the rainy and cloudy day of the match in Rancagua. In the second leg on 2 July, played at the Estadio Nacional, the scoreline was 1–1 which put O'Higgins up 3–2 on aggregate, and was about to win their first league title by becoming Torneo de Apertura champions, until the 92nd minute, because with Guillermo Marino's goal the series was equalized at 3–3 and the match went to penalties. "La U" won the penalty shootout 2–0 thanks to their keeper Jhonny Herrera, who saved three penalties. However, the match was full of controversy, because the referee Enrique Osses conceded a non–existent penalty to Marino, that was scored by Aránguiz, and unfairly red-carded centre back Julio Barroso, after Universidad de Chile defender José Rojas had initially taunted Barroso.

==== Tomé Tragedy ====
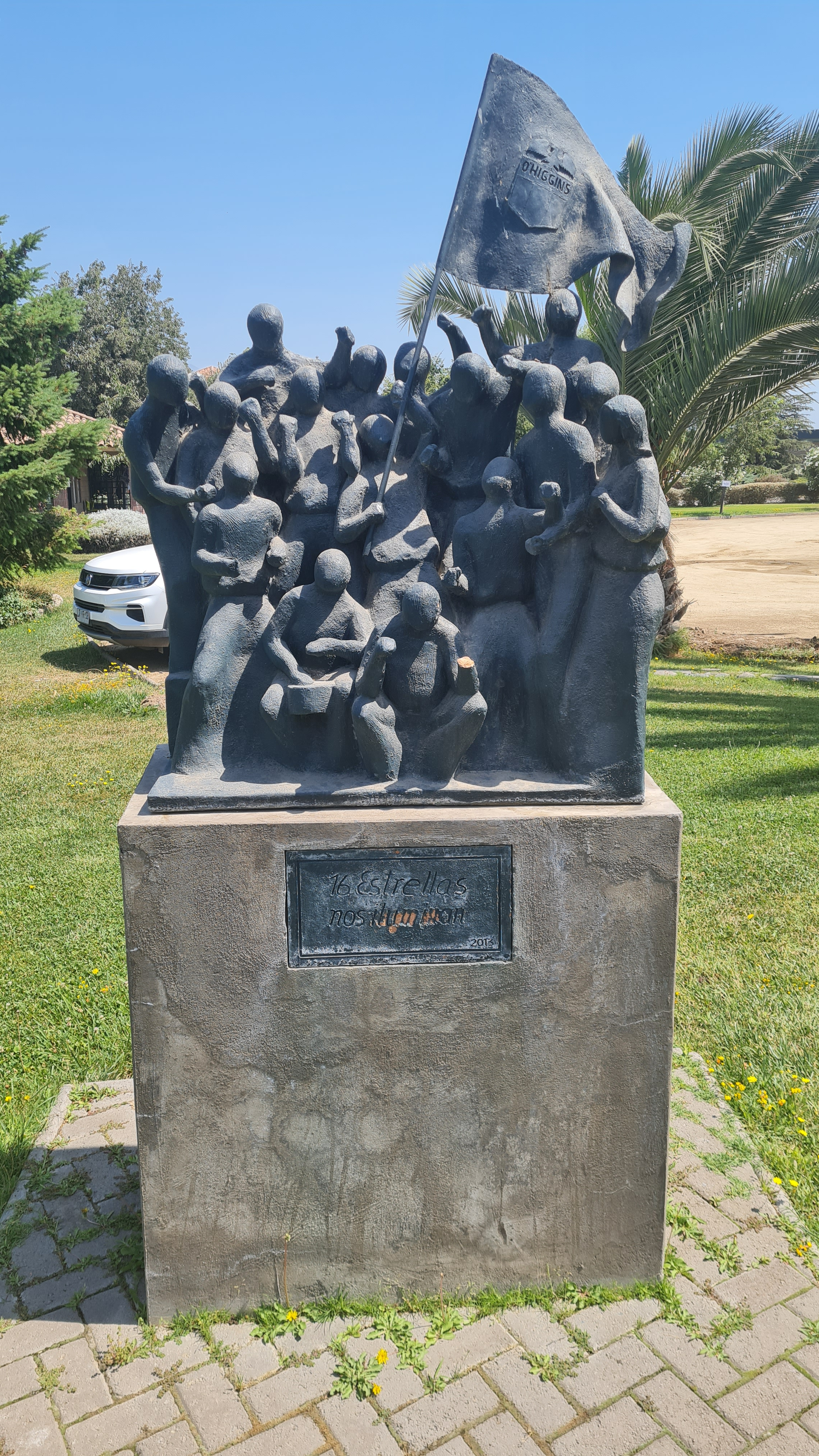
Memorial to the 16 victims of the Tomé tragedy, in Monasterio Celeste.

In the Torneo Transición 2013, Berizzo brought in many reinforcements such as Osmán Huerta, Mariano Uglessich, Braulio Leal, Gonzalo Barriga and Pablo Calandria among others. In this tournament the club also played the last official match at Estadio El Teniente, after it was awarded for renovations ahead of the 2015 Copa America, rotating between Estadio Santa Laura, Estadio La Granja and Estadio Monumental David Arellano during the rest of the tournament.

After the away victory against Huachipato at Estadio CAP in the third matchday of the league, an unfortunate tragedy happened. On 9 February 2013, at around midnight in Tomé, a bus carrying O'Higgins fans crashed and 16 fans died. Instead of going back to Rancagua, the fans decided to make a stop in Dichato for a festival. Out of 37 fans in the bus, 16 died and 21 were injured. As a result of the tragic accident, a three-day mourning was declared in Tomé and Rancagua, and fans made a farewell to the deceased at the Estadio El Teniente.

O'Higgins eventually finished fourth after an acceptable campaign, where it was beaten by Unión Española, Universidad Católica and Cobreloa. However, the club had to finish third to qualify for the Copa Sudamericana, and therefore missed out.

O'Higgins Final starting line-up against Universidad Católica.

==== Another fight for the title ====
For the 2013–14 Torneo Apertura, O'Higgins is reinforced with players like Fernando Gutiérrez, Francisco Pizarro and Pedro Pablo Hernández. The club started playing this tournament against Deportes Iquique, and win with a goal that was eventually scored by the tournament's top scorer, Pablo Calandria. In the next match the club defeats Deportes Antofagasta 2–1 with goals from Pizarro and Gonzalo Barriga. On the next match day, the club tied with Audax Italiano but after that they team went on a significant winning streak, which began by beating Cobresal in El Salvador, and then Cobreloa, Universidad de Concepción, Universidad Católica, Unión Española and a victory over Unión La Calera in the final minutes, with the club only losing two games against Palestino and Colo-Colo.

==== The match versus Rangers de Talca ====
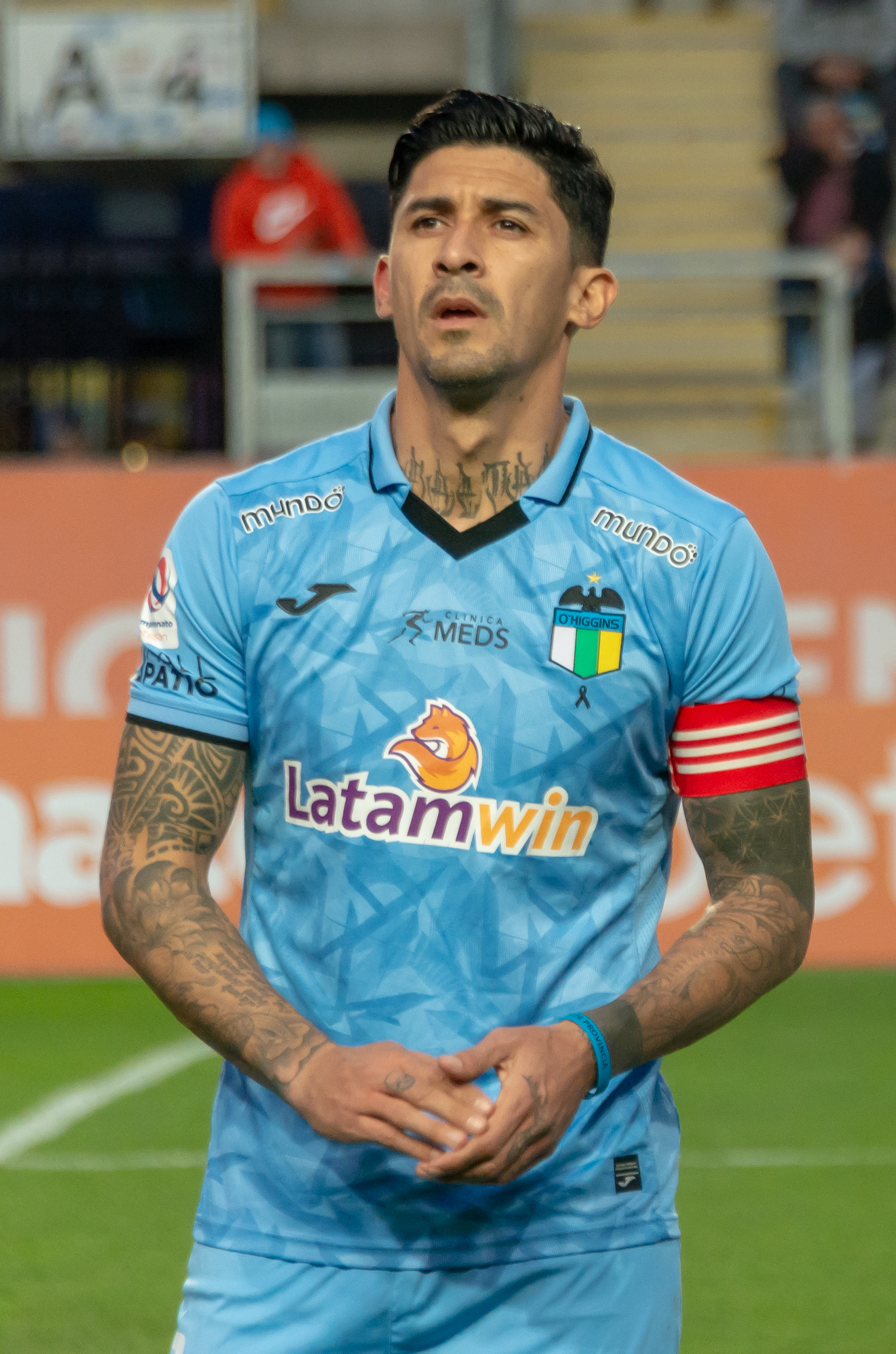
Pedro Pablo Hernández scored the goal against UC for winning the first title in the club's history.

On 7 December 2013, the last match day of the championship, the club has to visit Rangers de Talca, where the team starts losing with a Mauricio Gómez goal, but the team did not give up and turned the game around in their favor with a penalty from Pablo Calandria and a goal from Julio Barroso. In the second half, it seemed like the title was slipping from their hands, because Rodolfo González and Esteban Ciaccheri scored at the Estadio Fiscal de Talca, to put the score at 3–2 in favor of Rangers.

Berizzo makes changes and substitutes Francisco Pizarro and Osmán Huerta into the match, and Huerta, with his first touch of the game, overcomes goalkeeper Nicolás Peric and ties the game at 3–3 with 10 minutes left, but in the 90' Calandria was brought down in the penalty box and referee Patricio Polic awarded a penalty for O'Higgins, along with red-carding Rangers goalkeeper Peric. Since Rangers had already used up all of their available substitutions, midfielder Hugo Diaz had to be the goalkeeper. At the same time, Universidad Católica was winning against La Calera in Quillota, so if O'Higgins tied or lost then Universidad Catolica would be the champion. In the last minute of the match, Calandria scored his penalty, unleashing the wild celebrations of 4,500 fans, with the club having completed an epic comeback to win the match 4–3, after Universidad Católica overcame La Calera 2–0.

==== The final ====
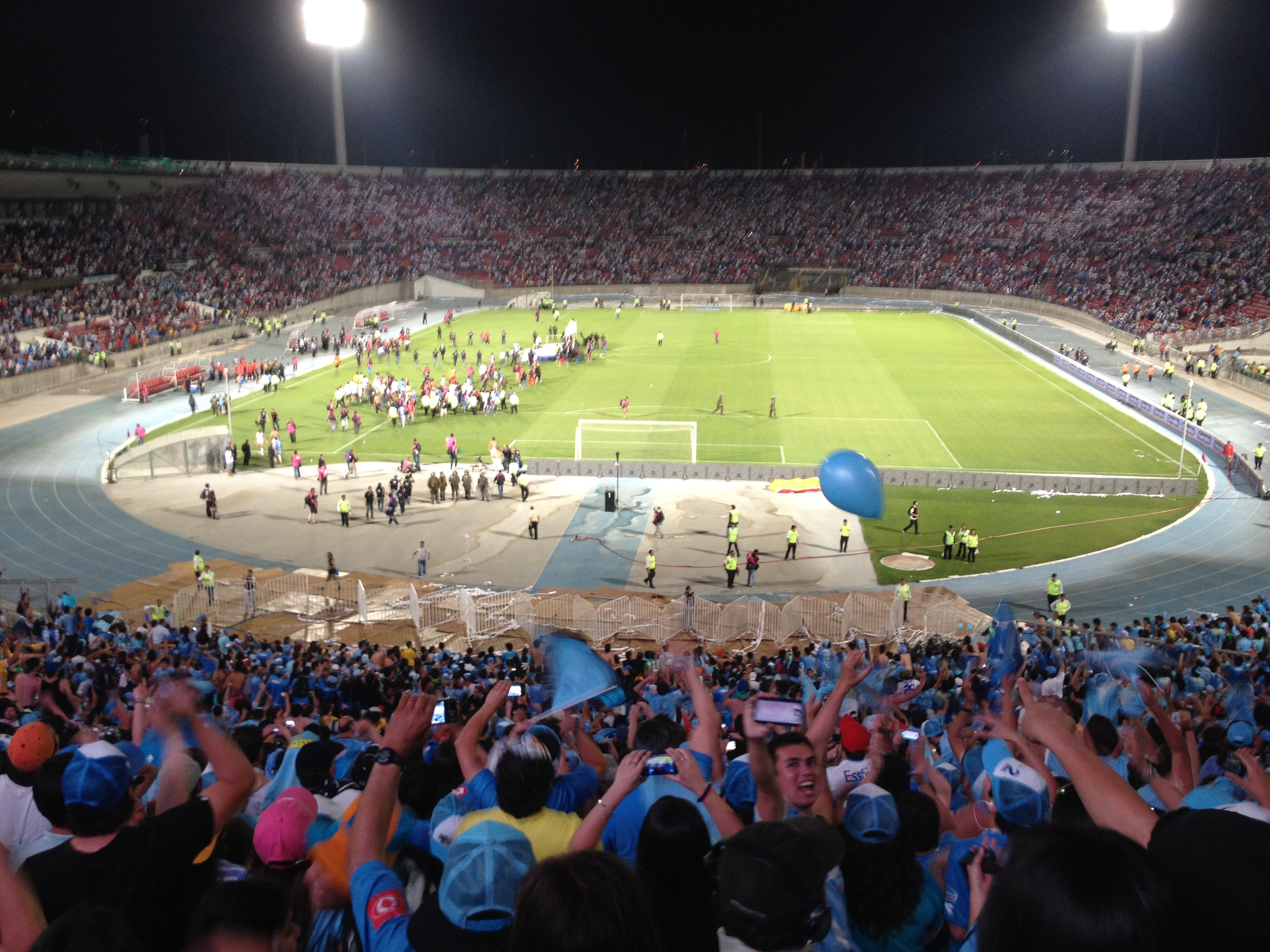
O'Higgins fans celebrating the 2013–14 Apertura title at Estadio Nacional de Chile.

After a hard-fought championship title fight against Universidad Católica, both finish the tournament with the same number of points. This meant there had to be a tiebreaking game, after an amendment to championship rules, since before the modification the champion was whoever had a better goal difference if both teams had the same number of points. This was the case for the 2013 tournament, in which Unión Española and Universidad Católica had equal points until the last matchday, but the league championship was given to Union Española because it had a better goal difference.

A graphic representation of Hernández's goal in the final. Opazo's free kick and a shot to the right of goalkeeper Christopher Toselli.

On 10 December 2013, in front of a sold-out Estadio Nacional de Chile, O'Higgins clinched a victory against the Crusaders, with Pablo Hernández scoring the only goal of the match, who ultimately entered club history and in the hearts of the fans as the person to give the club its first Primera División league title.

=== Supercopa Champion and back to Copa Libertadores ===
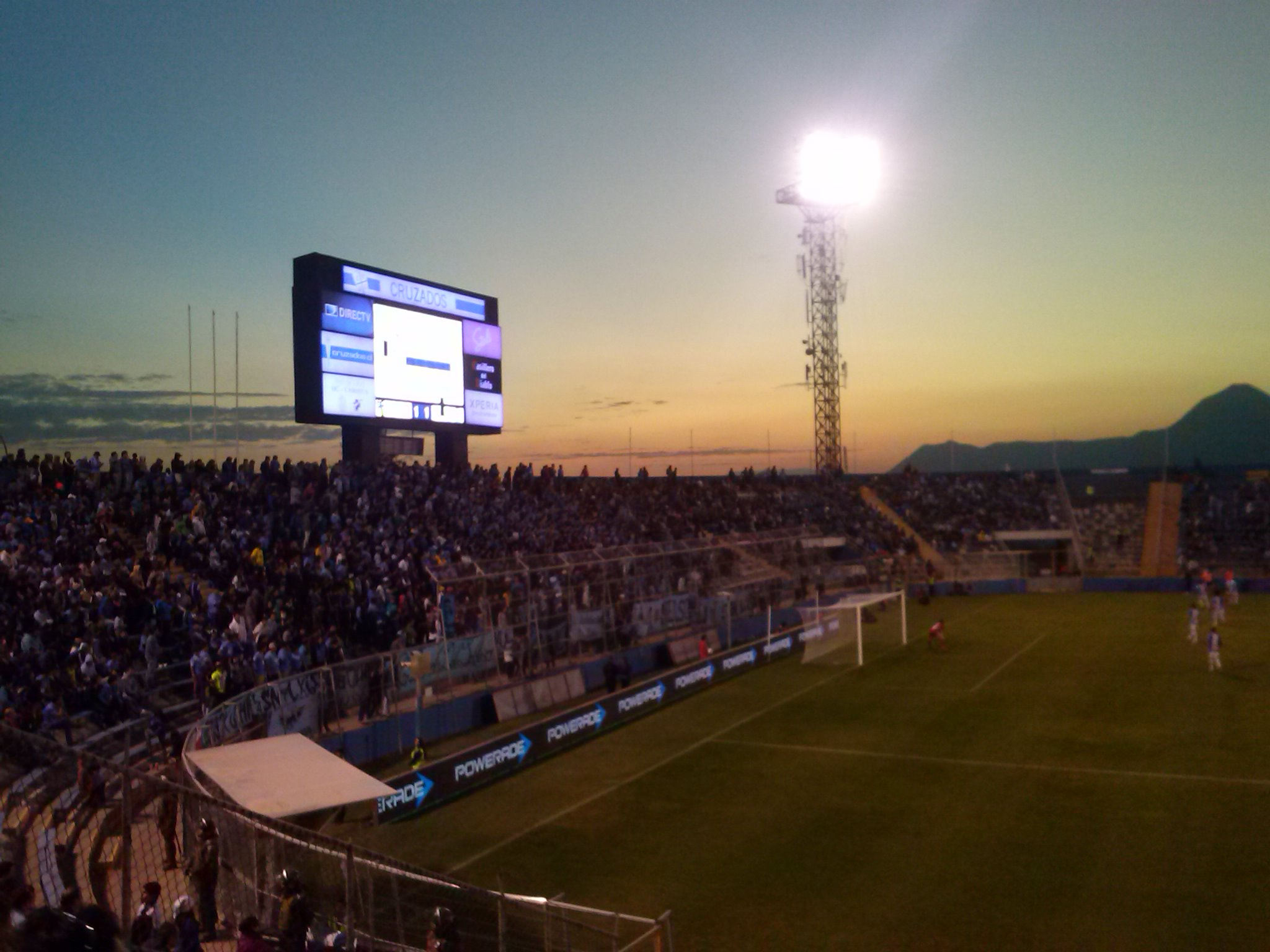
The fans in the Supercopa de Chile match against Deportes Iquique

After winning the final of the 2013 Torneo Apertura, the club returns to the Copa Libertadores after almost three decades, (their last participation was in 1984), participating in Group 3 with Cerro Porteño, Deportivo Cali and Lanús. The first game was played against Lanús on 13 February 2014, at Estadio Ciudad de Lanús, where the match ends 0–0. In the second match, O'Higgins faced Deportivo Cali at Estadio Monumental in Santiago, where Yerson Opazo put the ball past Colombian goalkeeper Faryd Mondragón, becoming the first player to score for the club in a Copa Libertadores match in 30 years, with the match ending 1–0 in favor of the celestes. In the third match the club played at the Estadio Monumental again, this time against Cerro Porteño, where the Rancaguan club began winning 2–0 with one of the goals being scored by Eduardo Alejandro López from a nice free-kick. However, after midfielder Braulio Leal was sent off, the momentum decreased and the Paraguayan club tied the game 2–2.

O'Higgins Supercopa starting line-up against Deportes Iquique.

In the next meeting the club played Cerro Porteño again but this time at Estadio General Pablo Rojas, where the club are defeated 2–1. In the fifth match the club traveled to Colombia to face Deportivo Cali at Estadio Olímpico Pascual Guerrero, where Yerson Opazo scored one of the best goals in the tournament from about 30 meters, but Deportivo Cali's Néstor Camacho tied the game at 1–1, and it finished with that score.

In the last group stage match against Lanus, O'Higgins returned to Estadio El Teniente after its renovation for the 2015 Copa América. O'Higgins had the chance to make the next round, but Calandria's penalty was saved by Agustín Marchesín, and the game ended 0–0, which meant the celestes were eliminated from the cup. O'Higgins finished with 7 points and in third place of its group.

In the Clausura 2014, O'Higgins ended in third place with 30 points, and in the Accumulated Table as second with 69 points, (surpassing Colo-Colo, Clausura champions) which qualified it to play the Supercopa de Chile to see who would be the Superchampion. The game was played at the Estadio San Carlos de Apoquindo against 2013–14 Copa Chile champion Deportes Iquique. Iquique started winning the match with a goal from Rodrigo Ezequiel Díaz, and O'Higgins leveled the score five minutes before the end of the first half with a goal from Luis Pedro Figueroa. The match ended 1–1 after 120 minutes and went into penalties. O'Higgins won 3–2 after Rodrigo Brito of Deportes Iquique missed his penalty, unleashing the joy of over 6,000 celeste fans who came to the Santiago Metropolitan Region, and becoming the second Superchampion of Chilean football.

=== After Berizzo era ===
After becoming Chile's super champion, Eduardo Berizzo leaves the institution and joins Celta de Vigo in Spain, thus ending the most successful seasons in the club's history. For the Apertura 2014 the new light blue coach is Facundo Sava, players like Luis Valenzuela arrive after his time at Deportes Antofagasta, Hans Martínez who came without regularity from Almería, the Uruguayan Octavio Rivero, who came to replace the scorer Pablo Calandria who was not registered in the tournament due to a meniscus injury, and the trans-Andean Jorge Carranza, Damián Lizio and Fernando Elizari in that championship began with a 2–1 victory over Unión La Calera, then on the following date they lost against the University of Chile in Rancagua. From then on the club falls into an irregularity within the tournament, the only highlight is the defeat against Colo-Colo at the Estadio Monumental by 3–2 with great participation by Octavio Rivero who scored 2 goals, who at the end of the tournament is the scorer of the team with 10 goals. Due to the great tournament he is bought by the Vancouver Whitecaps for 3 million USD. At the end of the championship the light blue team finished in eighth position, with this Facundo Sava was dismissed from the team.

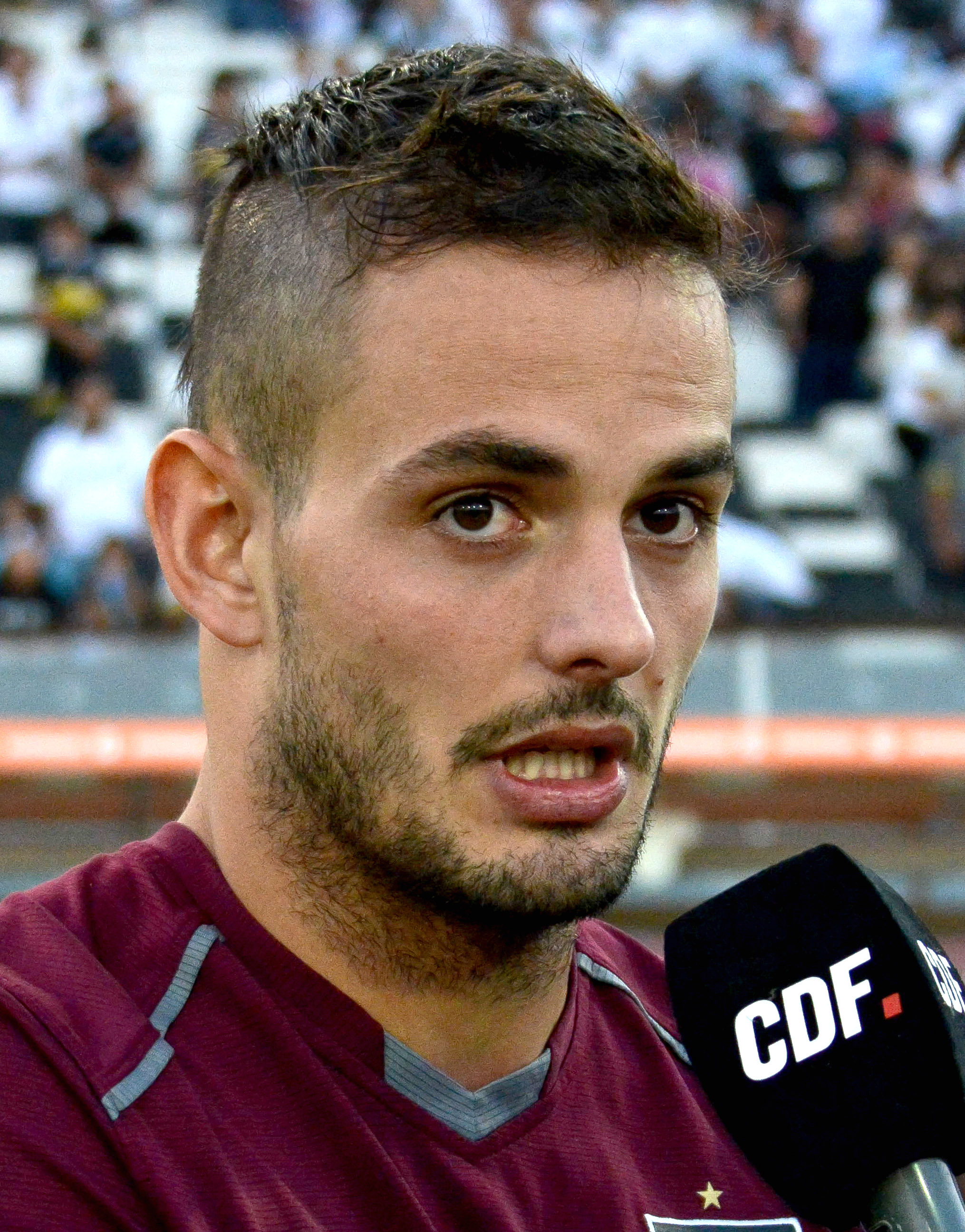
Octavio Rivero was top scorer of the club in 2015, then moving to Vancouver Whitecaps.

In the 2015 Clausura, after the dismissal of Facundo Sava, Vitamina Sánchez took over the team, Hugo Droguett, who came from South Korea, and Sebastián Pinto, who returned to the institution after passing in 2011, joined the squad. In the championship they finished in ninth position, qualifying by exclusion to the 2015 Pre-Sudamericana Liguilla because clubs such as Universidad de Concepción, Universidad de Chile, Huachipato were already classified for the international tournament. In the league O'Higgins faces the Universidad Católica, in the first leg of the first round they face each other at the El Teniente, equaling 2 goals, which were converted by Pablo Calandria, for the crusaders David Llanos and José Luis Muñoz. In the second leg, Universidad Católica wins 3–1, the discount went to Sebastián Pinto. Once again Pablo Calandria is the team's top scorer with 8 goals.

The second part of the year in the 2015 Apertura, the team is reinforced with; Esteban González from Huachipato and a historic one like Yerson Opazo leaves for the plant institution, Pedro Muñoz from the Universidad de Concepción, Emilio Zelaya from Arsenal de Sarandí and the returns of Gonzalo Barriga who came from a loan at Santiago Wanderers, and Ramón Fernández, Hans Martínez was fired from the club, Sebastián Pinto goes to Eskişehirspor, César Fuentes is bought by Universidad Católica and Alejandro López leaves for Cobresal. In the tournament the club does not achieve regularity, losing more games as a visitor, finishing undefeated at the El Teniente, however Pablo Sánchez's team fails to compete in the tournament or qualify for the postseason for a place in an international tournament. finishing in seventh position with a performance of 51%, thus ending the Vitamina era in O'Higgins. Pablo Calandria is the team's top scorer with 9 goals and reaches 51 goals for the club and ranks among the historical scorers.

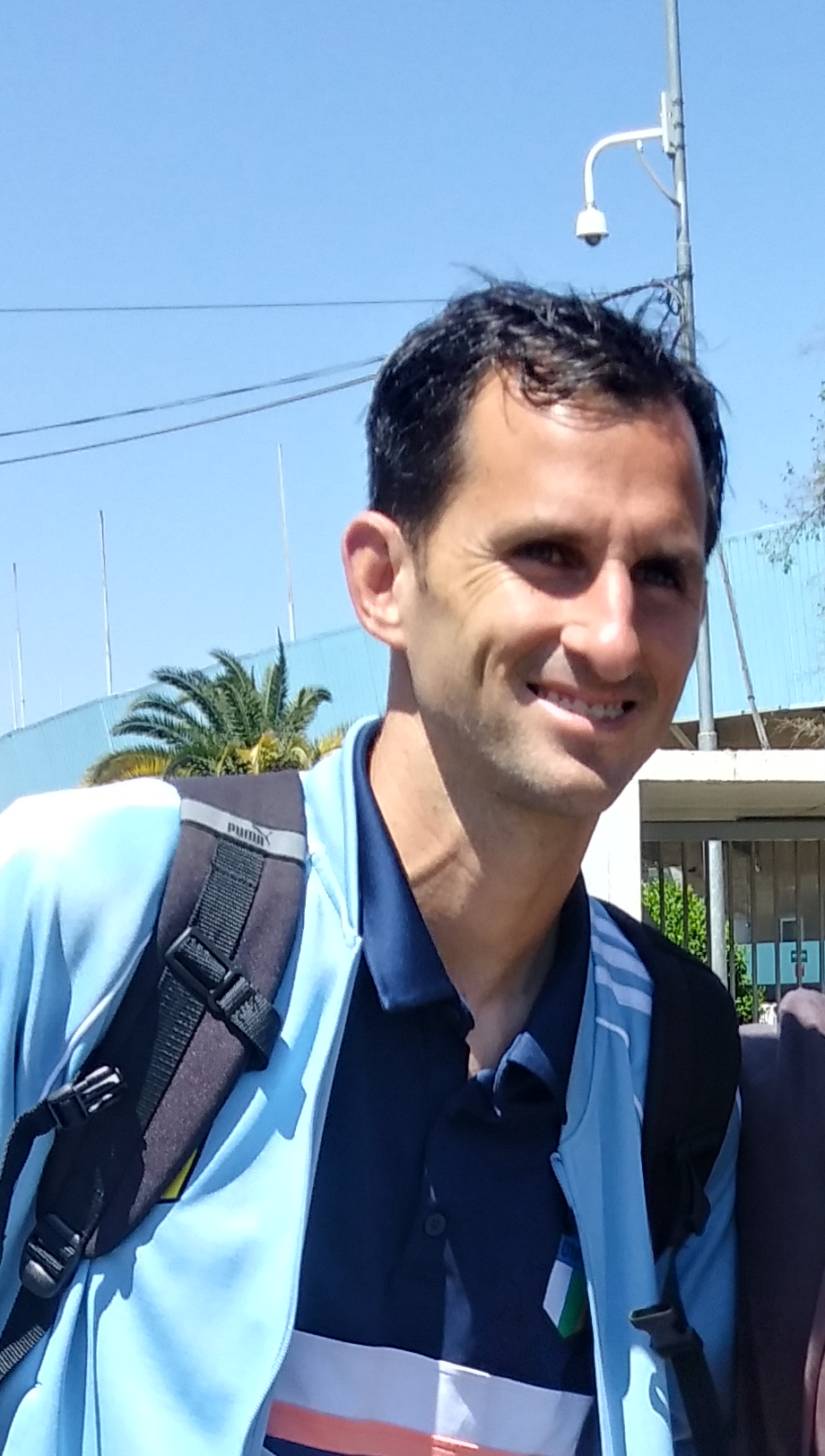
Pablo Calandria played his last game at O'Higgins in 2017.

In 2016 the club again carried out a campaign fighting for the title until the last date, after the interim Cristián Arán took over as main coach, losing the chance to become champion after a defeat on the last date of the 2016 Clausura championship against the Universidad de Concepción 1–2 at home at the El Teniente, leaving the title to Universidad Católica, which wins its match against Deportes Iquique. In the 2016 Copa Sudamericana, the club lost in the penalty shoot-out (5–4), after a 0–0 agreggated against the Uruguayan side Montevideo Wanderers.

The 2017 started with a failed participation in the 2017 Copa Sudamericana, facing the Ecuadorian Fuerza Amarilla, losing in the agreggated 2–1, playing his away game at the Estadio George Capwell. Due to the bad results, the head coach Cristián Arán resigned his contract with the club. Gabriel Milito was the head coach assignated for the next tournament, finishing in 14th position in the 2017 Transición. Despite this, the club was only in 5th annual position in the relegation table, due to its previous campaign. After Milito's resignation, Mauricio Larriera takes over the team, achieving poor results, which costs him his job midway through the season. The team takes a boost in the final stretch of 2018 season led by Marco Antonio Figueroa, finishing eighth, but out of international competitions, also marking the retirement of sky-blue scorer Pablo Calandria, who scored at his last game a penalty against Audax Italiano.

=== COVID-19 and International failures ===
In 2019 he again had a regular campaign, finishing the year in eighth place, with Maximiliano Salas being his top scorer with 6 goals. The year 2020 marked by the COVID-19 pandemic forced the Campeonato Nacional to stop for a time. After the resumption of the tournament, the team fought relegation until the arrival of Dalcio Giovagnoli, with whom the team managed to escape reaching 10th position, winning their match on the last day against Colo-Colo in the last minute with a penalty goal from Tomás Alarcón, who was sell to Cádiz at the end of the season, which cost the white team to compete in the promotion league due to relegation. The following seasons have been marked by the team's irregularity and also by the failure to qualify for international tournaments, marking in 2021 the departure of Giovagnoli and the fleeting entry of Miguel Ramírez during the second semester. The year 2022 was directed solely by the Argentine strategist Mariano Soso, and despite the fact that he returns to amend an acceptable campaign, he does not qualify for the Copa Sudamericana, which ends up costing him his position as strategist of the sky-blue team. The following years saw irregularity on the part of the Rancagua team, managing to close the year 2023 with Juan Manuel Azconzábal as coach in eleventh place, being replaced the following year under the interim of Víctor Fuentes, reaping one of its worst campaigns in 2024, where it finished in fourteenth position, saving its stay in the Primera División only by goal difference against Cobreloa. The poor campaign meant the departure of Fuentes from the technical command for 2025, but also the departure of Javier Furwasser from the management, and of Pablo Calandria, who was relocated to technical management of the club. To face the year 2025, the club announced the hiring of Argentine coach Francisco Meneghini.

=== Grupo Caliente: New Owners and the return to Copa Libertadores ===
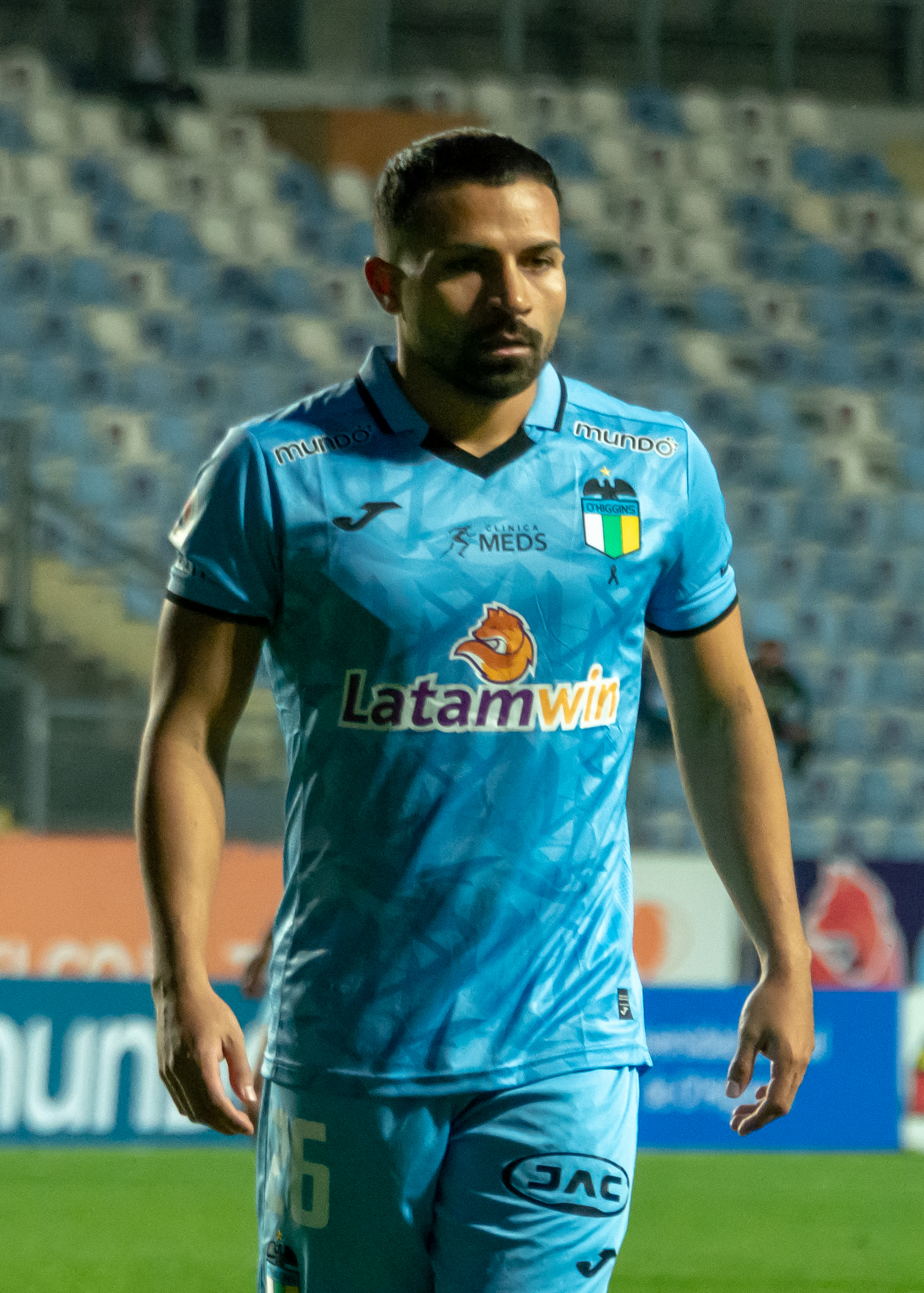
Bryan Rabello, one of the key players and the goalscorer of the 2025 season.

At the club's 70th anniversary gala, Abumohor confirmed his desire to step down from the club's leadership, highlighting the possible sale to various interested business groups. The sale to Grupo Caliente, confirmed on 16 July 2025, by the club, was estimated at approximately US$26 million. This figure includes all of the club's shares in the Primera División de Chile, as well as the infrastructure of its training center, known as the Monasterio Celeste. Estadio El Teniente, the sports venue where O'Higgins plays its home games, was not part of the transaction, as it is owned by the Chilean state-owned company Codelco.

Although the transaction is attributed to Grupo Caliente, a Mexico-based conglomerate specializing in sports betting and casinos, the names leading this acquisition and becoming the new owners of the club are an investment group that includes Christian Bragarnik, Jorge Hank Rhon, Jorge Reina and Matías Ahumada. The year 2025 marked a new generation for the club, with Matías Ahumada taking the reins alongside Ricardo Abumohor's work team, led by Pablo Hoffmann, who guided the new management through a period of adaptation.

On the grass, Meneghini secured third place in the Primera División, clinching a Copa Libertadores berth after a 12-year absence from the competition. This was achieved with a last-minute victory against Everton, secured by a penalty goal from Francisco González. A new lineup featuring players like González, goalkeeper Omar Carabalí, Alan Robledo, Felipe Faúndez, Maximiliano Romero, Martín Sarrafiore, and the team's top scorer, Bryan Rabello, marked a turning point for the club, which had gone eight years without qualifying for international competitions. The campaign was slightly marred by their elimination in the first round of the Copa Chile.

O'Higgins was drawn against Esporte Clube Bahia, owned by the City Football Group, in the second qualifying stage of the 2026 Copa Libertadores. A victory in Rancagua, with a goal from Francisco González, gave the home side a slight advantage going into the second leg. However, they lost 2-1 in Salvador, with Arnaldo Castillo scoring for O'Higgins, forcing a penalty shootout. O'Higgins ultimately defeated the Brazilian team, securing international participation that year. In the third qualifying stage, O'Higgins fell to Deportes Tolima 1-2 on aggregate, sealing their defeat in the final five minutes of the match in Ibagué. A goal from Juan Pablo Torres dashed their hopes of advancing in the competition, sending them to the 2026 Copa Sudamericana, where they were drawn against São Paulo, Millonarios, and Boston River.

== Facilities ==
=== Estadio El Teniente ===
Estadio El Teniente
- El Mundialista de Rancagua (The World Cup Stadium of Rancagua); Templo de las Ilusiones (Temple of Illusions)
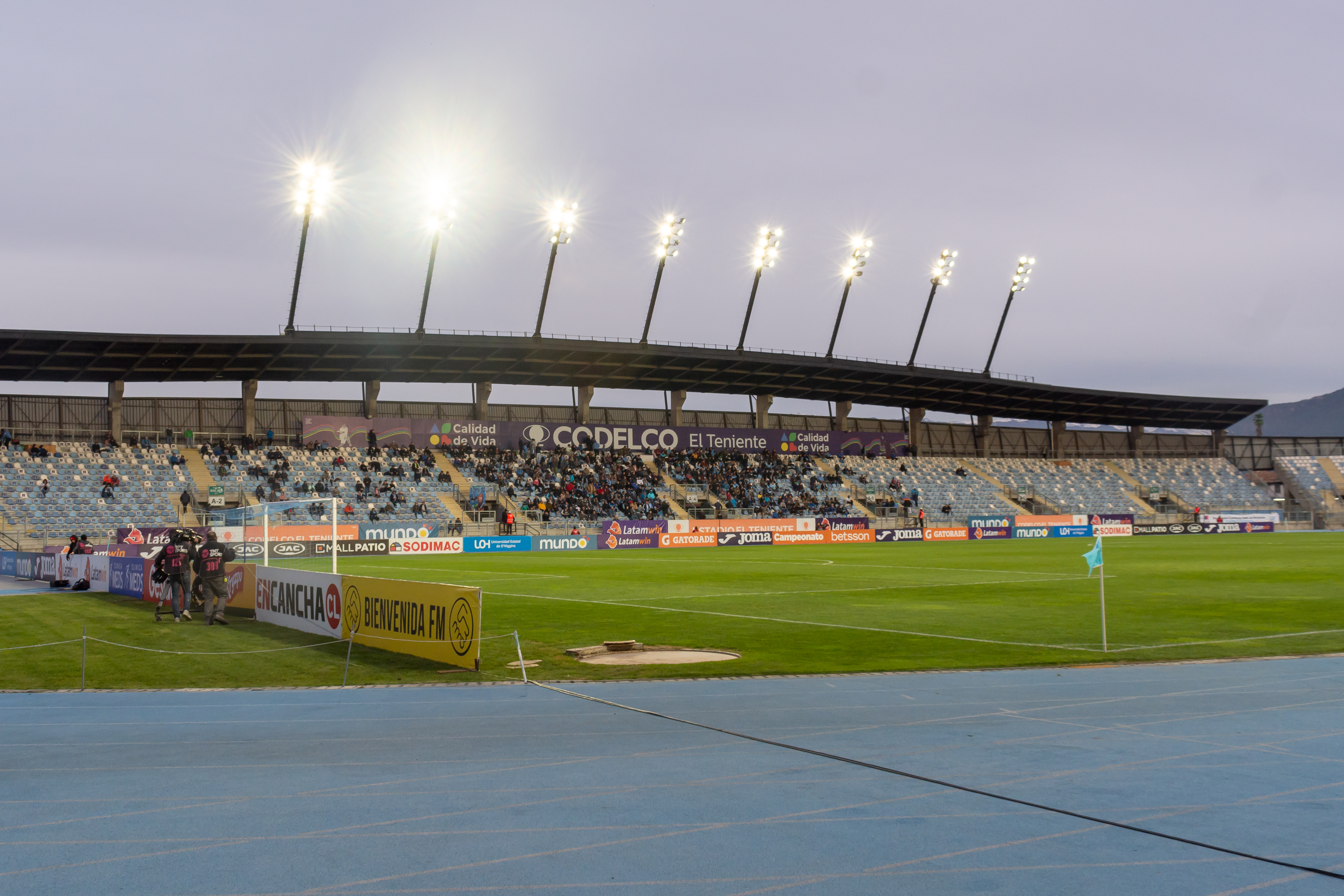
- Capacity: 14,087
- Surface: Natural grass
- Field size: 105 m × 68 m (344 ft × 223 ft)

Construction
- Opened: 1947; 2014 (renovated)

The club's home ground is Estadio El Teniente, built in September 1945 and located in Rancagua, being named Braden Copper Company Stadium, because that company was the stadium's owner. The first professional game was during the 1955 Primera División tournament, in a match that O'Higgins won 3–2 to Ferrobádminton.

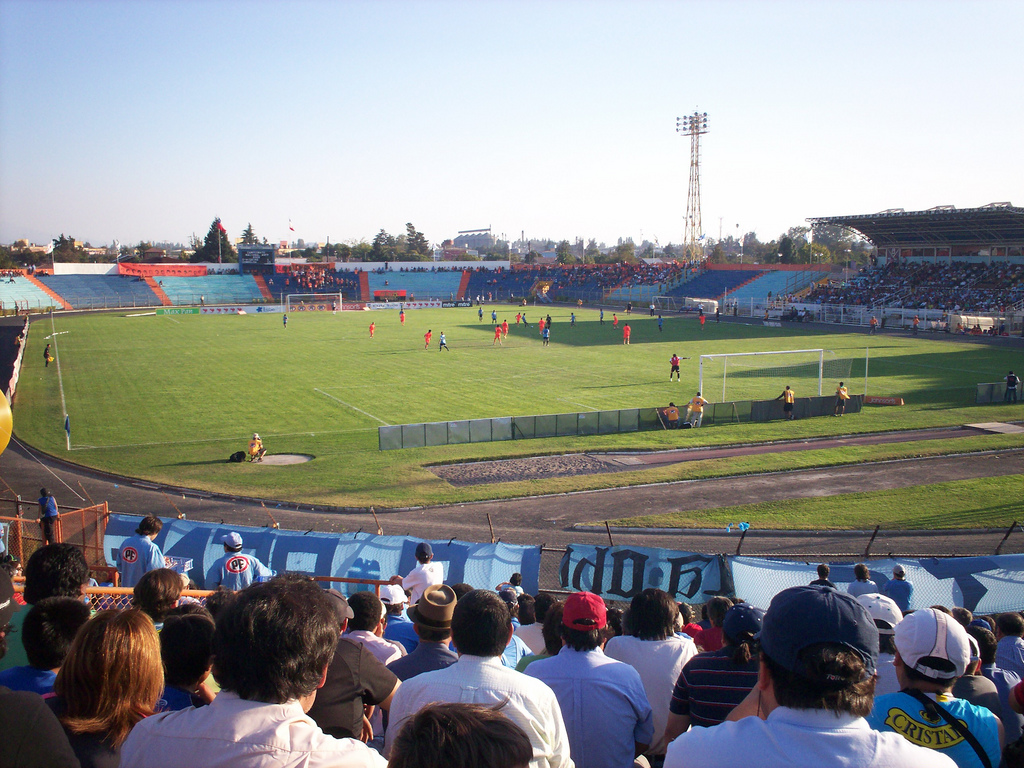
The old Estadio El Teniente was used from 1945 until February 2013.

In 1960, after the 9.5 earthquake of Valdivia that destroyed the original venues of the 1962 FIFA World Cup, the Chilean delegation designed the city of Rancagua as a venue, after the refusal of Valparaíso and Antofagasta. The first international match was between Argentina and Bulgaria, where with a goal of Héctor Facundo, the South Americans defeated the Europeans on 30 May. El Teniente was the home stadium of all Group D matches, and one quarter-final game between West Germany and Yugoslavia.

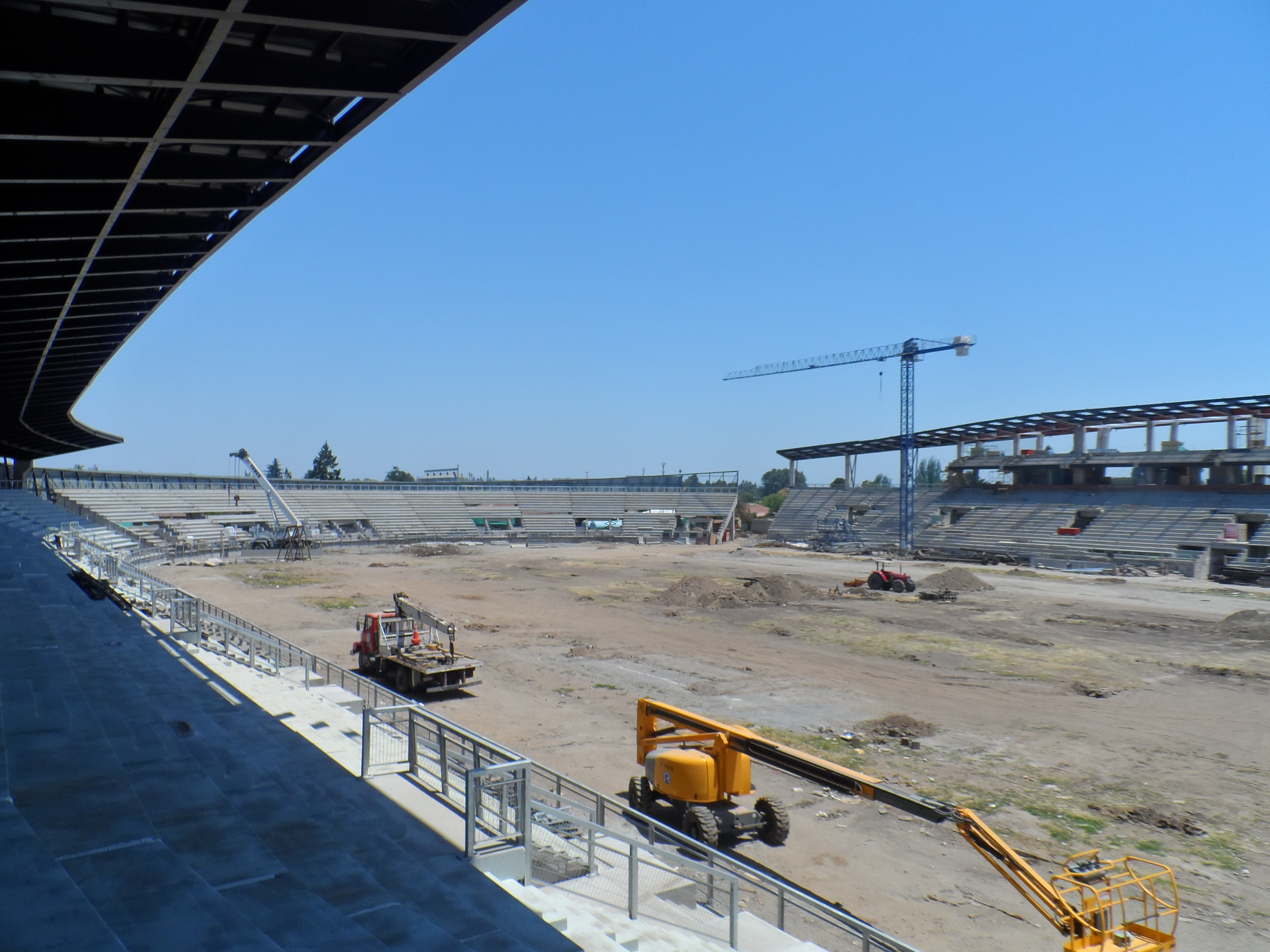
Estadio El Teniente in January 2014.

The Government of Chile acquired the 51% of shares to United States' Braden Copper Company in 1967, as part of the copper nationalization, that culminated four years later, becoming property of Codelco Chile, being re–named with the current name of Parque El Teniente, in reference to mine ubicated in locality of Machalí.

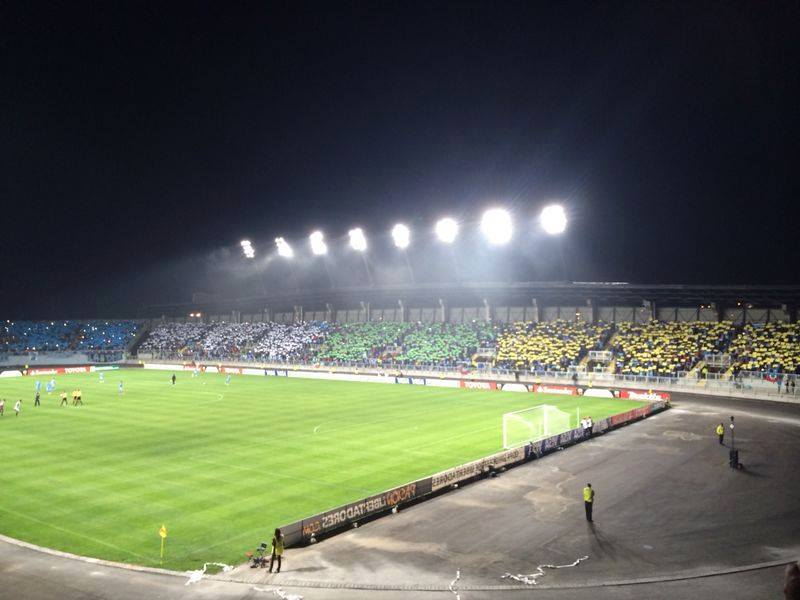
The new Estadio El Teniente in its inauguration match against Lanús

A new stadium with capacity for 14,087 persons was confirmed by the club's owner Ricardo Abumohor in 2013, and the old stadium was demolished in 2014.

The new stadium was inaugurated on 8 April 2014. In the inaugural match, O'Higgins played against Lanús for the week 6 of the 2014 Copa Libertadores. The final result was 0–0, marking the elimination of the club from the competition, because it needed a victory to advance to the next round. In 2015, it hosted two group stage matches of the 2015 Copa América.

=== Monasterio Celeste ===
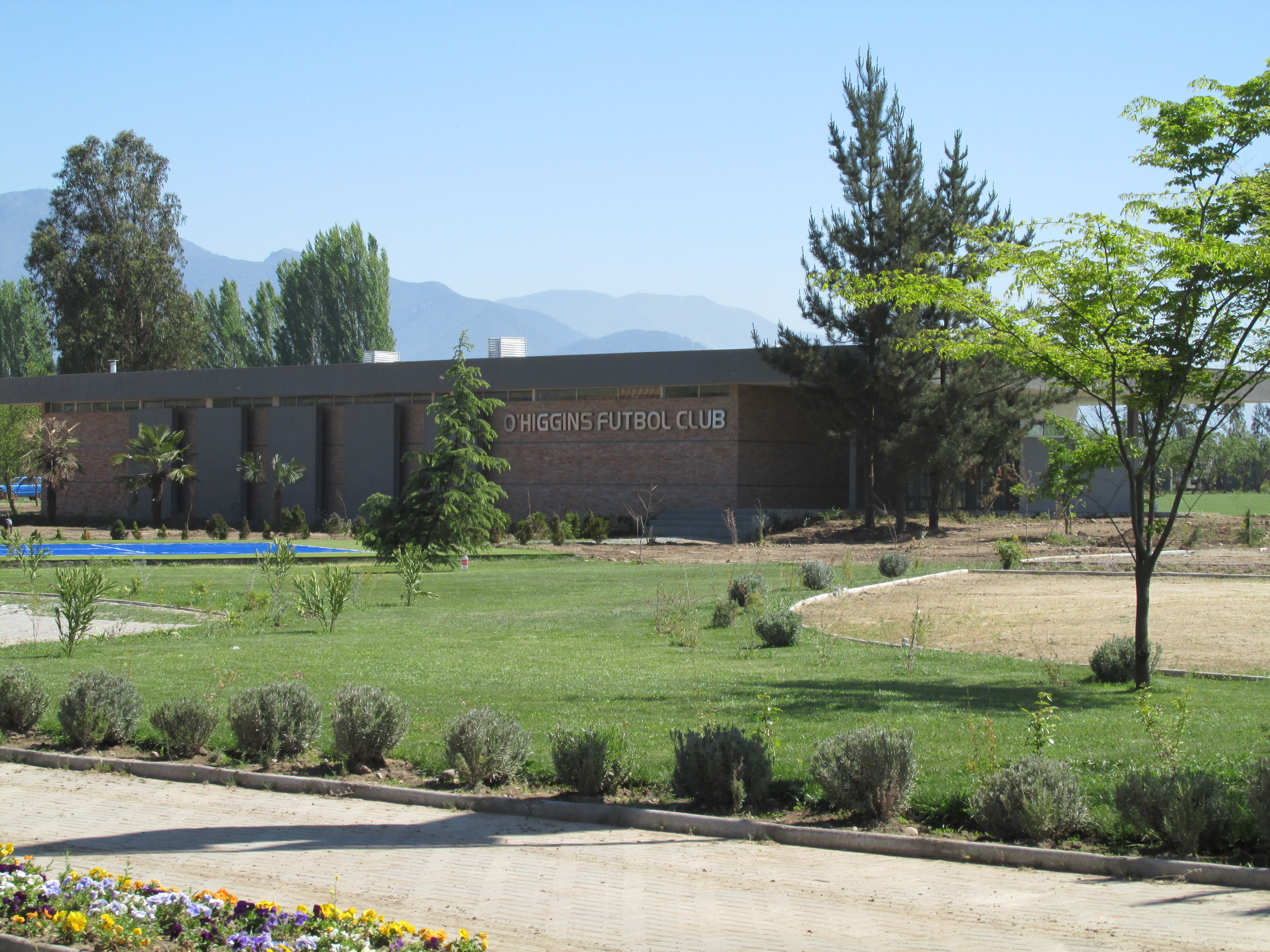
The entry to the Monasterio Celeste.

The training facilities of the club are called the Monasterio Celeste, located on the outskirts of Rancagua, exactly in Requínoa. It replaces the old complex La Gamboína, which until 2014 was the training ground of the club. The complex consists of seven pitches of natural grass, a mini-stadium of artificial grass, and a hotel with the facilities for the team.

The complex was finished in 2014, but O'Higgins trained there for the first time on 4 January 2013. It was a national team host complex for the Venezuela national football team in the 2015 Copa América.

== Players ==
Since the club's establishment in April 1955, more than one thousand of the players on the team have been Chilean. Juvenal Vargas is the historic top−scorer of the club with 120 goals. Mario Desiderio is considered the best player in the club's history. The last player to enter the club's top 10 scorers was Pablo Calandria, who retired in 2018, scoring his final goal from a penalty against Audax Italiano.

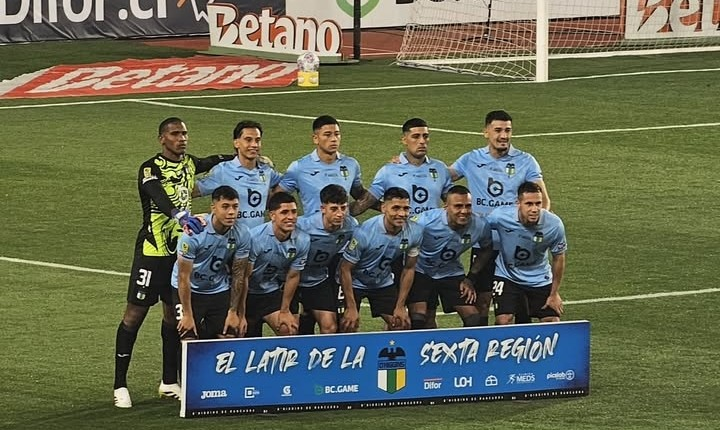
O'Higgins starting line-up for the 2026 Liga de Primera.

Foreign players like Federico Vairo have also been important players in the history of club. During the mid–1960s, Vairo was a former River Plate player, earning three consecutive Primera División titles, alongside players like the keeper Amadeo Carrizo, the midfielder Omar Sívori, among others.

Another important player of the club is Pablo Hernández, also Argentine, who was part of the historic squad led by Eduardo Berizzo that won the 2013–14 Torneo de Apertura. He is also important because he scored the goal in the Super Final match against Universidad Catolica, which gave the league title to the club. He was one of the most important players of the team, alongside the goalkeepers Paulo Garcés and Roberto González, the defenders Julio Barroso, Mariano Uglessich and Yerson Opazo, the midfielders Luis Pedro Figueroa, César Fuentes, Braulio Leal, Gonzalo Barriga and the striker and top goalscorer Pablo Calandria, among others.

The team has had several Argentine footballers in majority, but also players of Paraguay, Uruguay, Brazil, Colombia and Venezuela have been in minority.

All-time top-ten goalscorers of the club ^{[note]}
(Chile); Juvenal Vargas	(Chile); Aníbal González	(Chile); Mario Núñez	(Argentina); Pablo Calandria	(Chile); Miguel Ángel Neira	(Chile); Leónidas Burgos	(Argentina); Gustavo De Luca	(Chile); Juvenal Soto	(Chile); Luis Pino	(Argentina); Mario Desiderio
120	119	82	79	79	78	74	63	60	47

1. Only includes Campeonato Nacional, Copa Chile and international competitions. Bold indicates player is still active.

All-time top-ten most capped players of the club ^{[note]}
(Chile); Luis Droguett	(Chile); René Serrano	(Chile); Guido Coppa	(Chile); Juvenal Vargas	(Chile); Albert Acevedo	(Chile); Waldo Quiroz	(Chile); Leónidas Burgos	(Chile); Constantino Zazalli	(Chile); Aníbal González	(Chile); Nelson Tapia
386	374	315	295	275	268	249	246	239	232

1. Only includes Campeonato Nacional, Copa Chile and international competitions. Bold indicates player is still active.

In 2006, under the orders of the manager Jorge Garcés, Giancarlo Maldonado, Venezuela national team striker, was signed, becoming the first footballer of that nationality to play in the club, and Aílton da Silva, seasons later, was the first player of Brazilian nationality in 2008 to arrive at the club.

The first player to be called up to the Chile national football team was Juvenal Soto, who was part of the squad that played in the first official match against Brazil. The club has contributed around 60 players to the national team since 1955, who in total have made over 40 appearances in Class-A matches with La Roja. Among these, Clarence Acuña is the one who accumulated the most appearances while playing for O'Higgins, with 20 matches played between 1994 and 1996. Further down the list are Miguel Ángel Neira (16), René Valenzuela (10), Santiago Gatica (9) and Eduardo Bonvallet (8) as the players who have represented the country on the most occasions.

=== First-team squad ===
Chilean teams are limited by the ANFP to have on their roster a maximum of six foreign players. ANFP rules also say the number of shirts can't exceed the number of registered players. As of the 2026 season, all Chilean teams must have included in the line-up, at least one Chilean players born on or after 1 January 2005, plus that youth players plays at least 1890 minutes.

As of 7 September 2026

No.	Pos	Nationality	Name	Place of birth	Previous club	Note
1	GK	Chile	Jorge Peña	Valparaíso	Unión La Calera	on loan from Unión La Calera
2	DF	Chile	Cristian Morales (Youth)	Coltauco	Youth teams	Homegrown player
3	DF	Chile	Felipe Faúndez (Youth)	Rengo	Youth teams	Homegrown player
4	DF	Chile	Adolfo Neira (Youth)	Los Ángeles	Youth teams	Homegrown player
5	MF	Chile	Gabriel Pinto (Youth)	Rancagua	Deportes Limache	Homegrown player
6	DF	Chile	Luis Pavez	Santiago	Unión Española	
7	DF	Argentina	Santiago Toloza	(Argentina) Morteros	Defensa y Justicia	Foreign player
8	MF	Chile	Felipe Ogaz	Quinta de Tilcoco	Fluminense	Homegrown player
9	FW	Paraguay	Arnaldo Castillo	(Paraguay) Ciudad del Este	Universidad de Concepción	Holds Chilean citizenship
10	MF	Chile	Bryan Rabello (vice-captain)	Rancagua	Grêmio Novorizontino	
11	MF	Chile	Juan Leiva (third-captain)	Chillán	Cobreloa	
13	FW	Chile	Joaquín Muñoz (Youth)	Quilleco	Youth teams	Homegrown player
14	MF	Chile	Martín Maturana	Rancagua	Deportes Santa Cruz	Homegrown player
15	DF	Chile	Benjamín Rojas	Santiago	Académico Viseu	
17	MF	Argentina	Tomás Avilés	(Argentina) Río Gallegos	Inter Miami	on loan from Inter Miami
18	FW	Chile	Esteban Moreira	Rancagua	Deportes La Serena	Homegrown player
19	FW	Chile	Javier Gutiérrez (Youth)	Curicó	Youth teams	Homegrown player
20	DF	Chile	Leandro Díaz	Curicó	Huachipato	
21	DF	Chile	Nicolás Garrido	Pucón	Colo-Colo	
22	DF	Argentina	Alan Robledo (captain)	(Argentina) José León Suarez	Alvarado	Foreign player
23	GK	Chile	Diego Carreño	San Francisco de Mostazal	Deportes Santa Cruz	Homegrown player
24	FW	Paraguay	David Fernández (Youth)	(Paraguay) Ñemby	Defensa y Justicia	Non-foreign registration
25	FW	Argentina	Ignacio Schor	(Argentina) Buenos Aires	Platense	Foreign player
26	FW	Chile	Rodrigo Godoy (Youth)	Graneros	Youth teams	Homegrown player
27	DF	Chile	José Tomás Movillo (Youth)	Linares	Youth teams	Homegrown player
28	FW	Argentina	Walter Bou	(Argentina) Concordia	Lanús	Foreign player, on loan from Lanús
29	FW	Chile	Bastián Yáñez	Santiago	Godoy Cruz	
30	FW	Chile	Joaquín Tapia (Youth)	Talca	Youth teams	Homegrown player
31	GK	Ecuador	Omar Carabalí	(Ecuador) Guayaquil	Colo-Colo	Holds Chilean citizenship
32	FW	Uruguay	Thiago Vecino	(Uruguay) Montevideo	Pari Nizhny Novgorod	Foreign player
33	DF	Argentina	Miguel Brizuela	(Argentina) Moreno	Vélez Sarsfield	Foreign player
34	DF	Chile	Benjamín Pérez (Youth)	Rancagua	Youth teams	Homegrown player
35	GK	Chile	José Tomás Parraguez (Youth)	Rancagua	Youth teams	Homegrown player

==== Players with multiple citizenship ====
There are players who currently have Chilean nationality on the squad through naturalization or nationalization, who do not occupy places as foreigners in the first team squad.

- (Ecuador) (Chile) Omar Carabalí
- (Paraguay) (Chile) Arnaldo Castillo
- (Chile) (Spain) Bryan Rabello
- (Chile) (Spain) José Tomás Movillo
- (Uruguay) (Italy) Thiago Vecino
- (Argentina) (Chile) Tomás Avilés

==== Players called-up internationally ====
These layers are still active in international call-ups in the last 12 months.

National team	Players
Chile	Felipe Faúndez, Felipe Ogaz

=== Team of The Century ===
In 1999, the fans of the club voted to choose the team of the 20th Century. Among the players which are in the starting line-up are the Argentine defender Federico Vairo, Miguel Ángel Neira, Mario Núñez, Mario Desiderio and the second goal-scorer of the history of the club, Aníbal González. The manager chosen was Luis Santibáñez, which reached two of the four participations in the Copa Libertadores, and led the club to its furthest position in the competition, the semi-finals, in 1980.

Pos.	Country	Player
GK	(Chile)	Carlos Bustos
GK	(Argentina)	Ernesto Díaz
GK	(Chile)	Constantino Zazzali
DF	(Chile)	Gabriel Mendoza
DF	(Argentina)	Federico Vairo
DF	(Chile)	Eduardo Herrera
DF	(Chile)	René Valenzuela
DF	(Chile)	René Serrano
DF	(Chile)	César Valdivia
DF	(Chile)	Santiago Gatica
DF	(Chile)	Mauro Meléndez
DF	(Chile)	Joel Molina

Pos.	Country	Player
MF	(Chile)	Roberto Rodríguez
MF	(Chile)	Miguel Ángel Neira
MF	(Chile)	Leonidas Burgos
MF	(Chile)	Francisco Cuevas
MF	(Chile)	Joel Retamal
FW	(Chile)	Alejandro Trujillo
FW	(Argentina)	Mario Desiderio
FW	(Chile)	Mario Núñez
FW	(Chile)	Aníbal González
FW	(Argentina)	Gustavo De Luca
FW	(Argentina)	Roque Alfaro
Coach	(Chile)	Luis Santibáñez

O'Higgins Team of The Century

== Recent results ==
=== Season stats ===
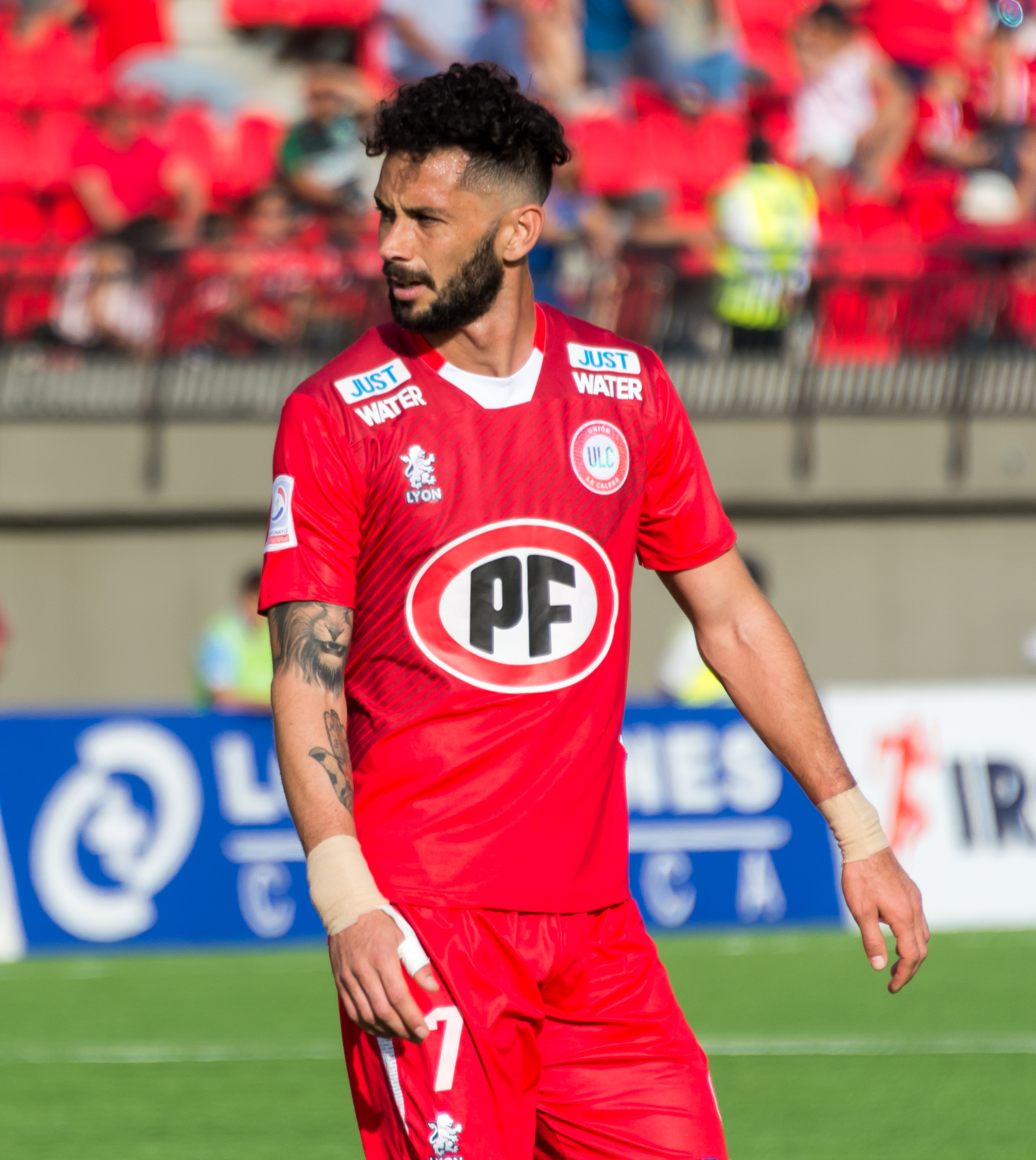
Marcelo Larrondo was 2021 team goalscorer.

Season	Rank	M	W	D	L	GS	GA	Pts.	Top scorer(s) in league	Goals	CL	SC	LIB	SUD
Liga de Primera 2025	3rd	30	16	8	6	43	34	56	Bryan Rabello	8	GS	—N/a	—N/a	—N/a
Campeonato 2024	14th	30	8	7	15	34	53	31	Bryan Rabello/Octavio Bianchi	6	QF	—N/a	—N/a	—N/a
Campeonato 2023	11th	30	9	8	13	37	39	35	Matías Marín	6	QF	—N/a	—N/a	—N/a
Campeonato 2022	8th	30	11	11	8	31	31	44	Facundo Barceló/Pablo Hernández	7	2R	—N/a	—N/a	—N/a
Campeonato 2021	13th	32	9	11	12	31	41	38	Marcelo Larrondo	8	2R	—N/a	—N/a	—N/a
Campeonato Nacional 2020	10th	34	12	9	13	40	39	45	Facundo Castro/Tomás Alarcón	7	—N/a	—N/a	—N/a	—N/a
Campeonato Nacional 2019	8th	24	10	4	10	34	35	34	Maximiliano Salas	6	R16	—N/a	—N/a	—N/a
Campeonato Nacional 2018	8th	30	12	5	13	41	41	41	Nicolás Mazzola	8	2R	—N/a	—N/a	—N/a

- Last updated: 3 December 2025
- Rank = Rank in Campeonato Nacional regular season; Pld = Matches played; W = Wins; D = Draws; L = Losses; GS = Goal scored; GA = Goal against; Pts = Points; COC = Copa Chile; SUP = Supercopa; COL = Copa Libertadores; COS = Copa Sudamericana; Lig. = Liguilla pre-international tournament
- NQ = Not qualified; Q = Qualified; GS = Group stage; 1R = First round; 2R = Second round; QF = Quarter-finals; F = Finalist; W = Winner

== Managers ==
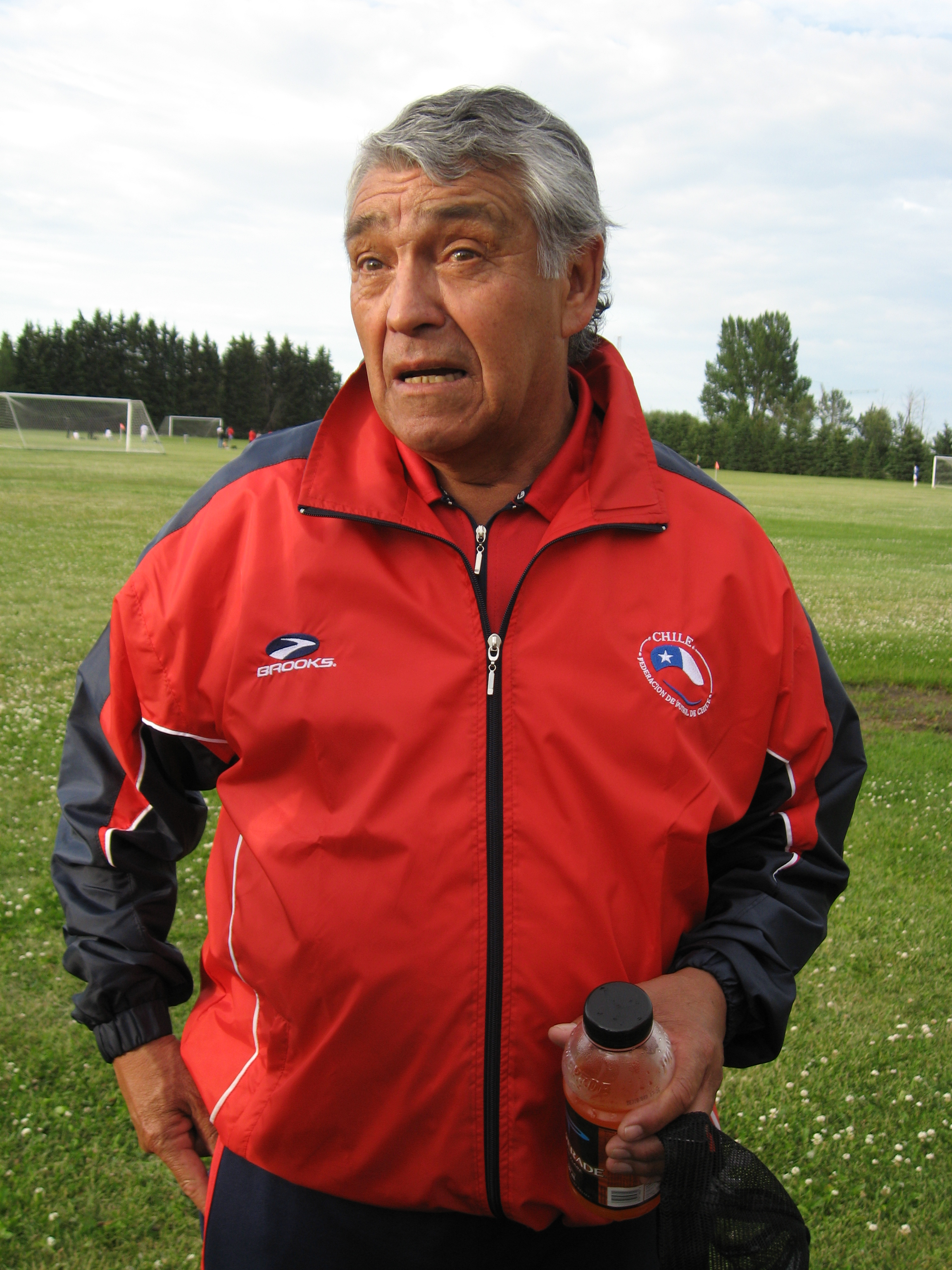
José Sulantay, coach of O'Higgins in 1996.

The first coach of the club was Francisco Hormazábal, who was signed for the 1955 Primera División tournament. In 1957, the board hired European Carlos Snopec as manager, who was the first international coach of the club. From 1958 to 1960 Argentine José Salerno was the manager of the club. The club went through three managers in 1961, and four managers in 1972.

In 1978–79, the club achieved an historic season with Luis Santibáñez as coach, who qualified O'Higgins to the 1980 Copa Libertadores' semi-finals, where the team lost to Club Nacional of Uruguay. In the early 1990s, the club's board signed Manuel Pellegrini to face the 1992 Copa CONMEBOL, where the club was eliminated early by Gimnasia y Esgrima de La Plata Then, with a prior spell of Nelson Acosta, who potentiated players like Jaime Riveros, the club achieved the finals of the Copa Chile in 1994, being runner–up under Roberto Hernández as coach. In 2005, Nelson Cossio became coach with the objective of reaching the first division again, which he achieved. Oscar Meneses coached the team during the Apertura tournament in their return to the first division, but was sacked due to poor performances.

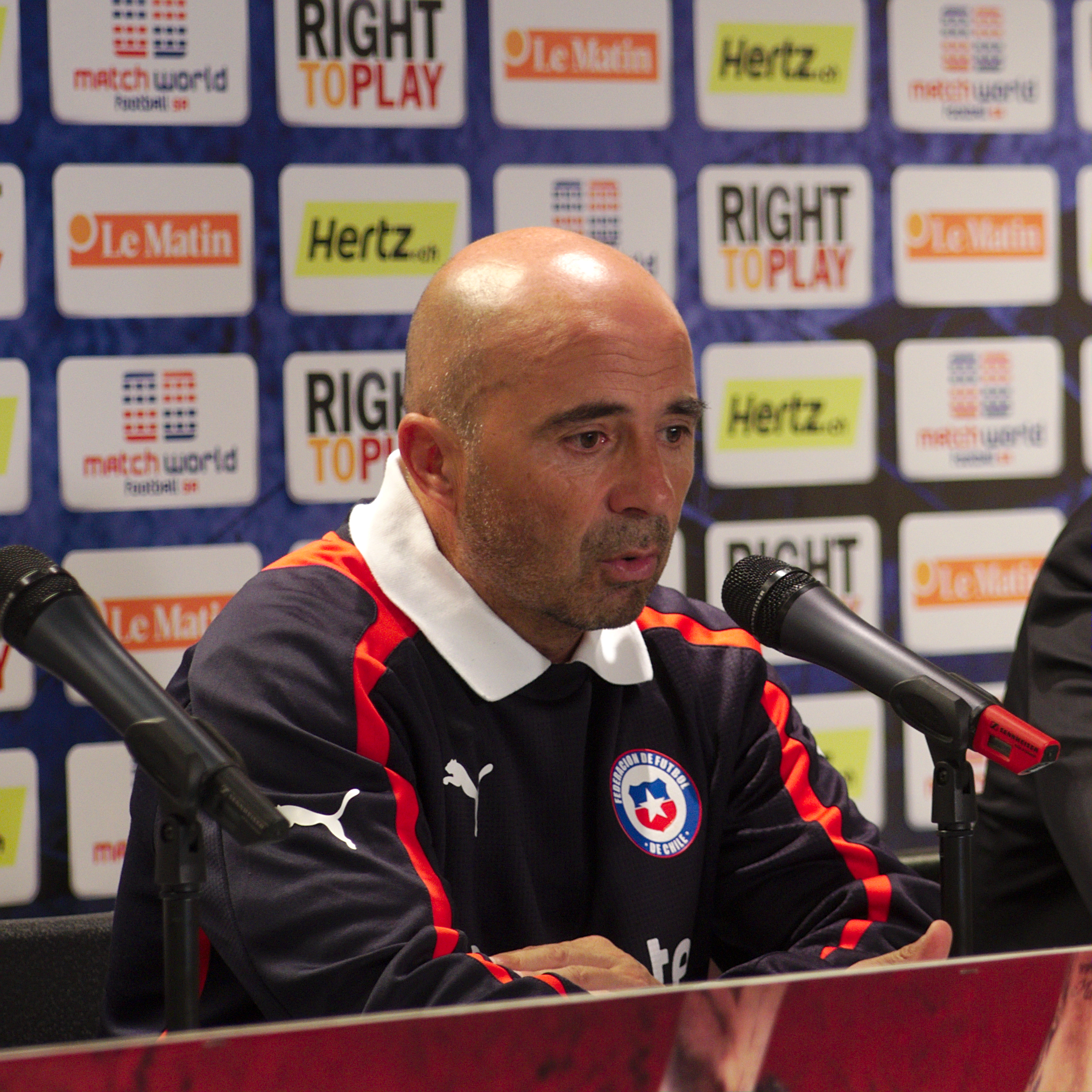
Jorge Sampaoli was the manager of the club from 2008 to 2009.

In 2006, Jorge Garcés became coach of the club to play the Torneo Clausura, who abandoned the institution the following season, after a 5–0 loss with Colo-Colo. In December 2007, Ricardo Abumohor, the club's owner, reported that he hired Argentine manager Jorge Sampaoli for the new tournament, where he had decent seasons with players like Jean Beausejour and Carlos Carmona as key players.

After a regular tournament in the 2010 season, Ivo Basay was signed for the 2011 Apertura. Basay was replaced by José Cantillana for the 2011 Clausura.

In January 2012, the club's board signed Eduardo Berizzo and his assistant coach, former River Plate's goalkeeper in the 1980s, Roberto Bonano. Under Berizzo's administration, the team reached the Apertura final, where the team finished runners-up after losing 2–0 in penalties to Universidad de Chile. However, this result gave the club qualification to the 2012 Copa Sudamericana, which is important due to the fact that O'Higgins hadn't played a continental competition since 1992. Berizzo also lead the team to their first league title in the 2013–14 Apertura, and to the Supercup win in 2014.

=== Current technical staff ===
Position	Name
Caretaker manager	(Argentina) Lucas Bovaglio
Assistant coach	(Argentina) Pablo Abraham
Assistant coach	(Argentina) Fernando Clementz
Doctor	(Chile) Felipe Rojas
Doctor	(Chile) Daniel Ahumada
Delegate	(Chile) Carlos Fierro
Video analist	(Argentina) Lautaro Correa
Manager	(Chile) Joshua Caro
Nutricionist	(Chile) Isabel Morales
Proyection Manager	(Chile) Albert Acevedo

Position	Name
Physio	(Chile) Cristofer Fuenzalida
Physio	(Chile) Daniel Donoso
Security chief	(Chile) Mario Muñoz
Paramedic	(Chile) José Luis Pérez
Goalkeeping coach	(Uruguay) Federico Elduayen
Fitness coach	(Argentina) Sebastián Morelli
Fitness coach	(Chile) Ricardo Madariaga
Equipment manager	(Chile) Andrés Rojas
Equipment manager	(Chile) Williams Acuña
Institutional Relations	(Argentina) Pablo Calandria

=== Chronology of managers ===
This list includes the managers and the interim managers since the foundation of the club until today. Only 23 managers in the history of the club are or were foreigners.

- (Chile) Francisco Hormazábal (1955–56)
- (Argentina) Salvador Calvente (1957)
- (Czechoslovakia) Carlos Snopek (1957)
- (Argentina) José Salerno (1958–60)
- (Argentina) Carlos Orlandelli (1960)
- (Chile) Roberto Rodríguez (1961)
- (Chile) Jorge Robledo (1961)
- (Chile) Hernán Carrasco (1961)
- (Hungary) (Chile) Ladislao Pakozdi (1961–62)
- (Argentina) José Pérez (1963–67)
- (Chile) Dante Pesce (1968)
- (Chile) Leonardo Bedoya (1968–69)
- (Chile) Jorge Aretio (1970)
- (Chile) Leonardo Bedoya (1971)
- (Chile) Hernán Carrasco (1972)
- (Chile) Luis Vidal (1972)
- (Paraguay) Ovidio Casartelli (1972)
- (Chile) Caupolicán Peña (1972)
- (Chile) Luis Vera (1973)
- (Chile) Jorge Aretio (1973)
- (Chile) Jorge Venegas (1974)
- (Chile) Leonardo Bedoya (1974–75)
- (Argentina) José Pérez (1975)
- (Chile) Jorge Aretio (1975)
- (Chile) Armando Tobar (1976–77)
- (Chile) Nelson Oyarzún (1977)
- (Chile) Luis Santibáñez (1978–79)
- (Chile) Orlando Aravena (1979)
- (Chile) (Spain) Francisco Molina (1980)
- (Chile) Orlando Aravena (1981)
- (Chile) Germán Cornejo (1982–83)
- (Chile) Leonardo Bedoya (1984)
- (Chile) Gastón Guevara (1985)
- (Chile) Jorge Luco (1985)
- (Chile) Manuel Cáceres (1985)
- (Chile) Luis Santibáñez (1986)
- (Chile) Jaime Campos (1986)
- (Chile) Eugenio Jara (1987)
- (Chile) Ricardo Horta (1988)
- (Chile) Juan Carlos Gangas (1988)
- (Uruguay) (Chile) Nelson Acosta (1988–91)
- (Chile) Germán Cornejo (1992)
- (Chile) Manuel Pellegrini (1992–93)
- (Chile) Roberto Hernández (1994–95)
- (Argentina) Roque Alfaro (1996)
- (Chile) Jorge Socías (1996)
- (Chile) José Sulantay (1997)
- (Uruguay) Gerardo Pelusso (1997)
- (Chile) René Serrano (1998–99)
- (Chile) Eduardo Salas (2000)
- (Chile) Guillermo Páez (2000–01)
- (Chile) Joel Retamal (2001)
- (Chile) Rubén Espinoza (2001)
- (Chile) Luis Droguett (2002)
- (Chile) Eduardo Salas (2003–04)
- (Paraguay) Sergio Nichiporuk (2004)
- (Chile) Nelson Cossio (2005)
- (Chile) Gerardo Silva (2005)
- (Chile) Óscar Meneses (2006)
- (Chile) Ronald Yávar (2006)
- (Chile) Jorge Garcés (2006–07)
- (Argentina) Jorge Sampaoli (2008–09)
- (Chile) Gerardo Silva (2009)
- (Chile) Roberto Hernández (2010)
- (Chile) Marco Antonio Figueroa (2010)
- (Chile) Ivo Basay (2011)
- (Argentina) Cristián Arán (2011)
- (Chile) José Cantillana (2011)
- (Argentina) Eduardo Berizzo (2012–14)
- (Argentina) Facundo Sava (2014–15)
- (Argentina) Pablo Sánchez (2015)
- (Argentina) Cristián Arán (2015–17)
- (Argentina) Gabriel Milito (2017–2018)
- (Uruguay) Mauricio Larriera (2018)
- (Chile) Marco Antonio Figueroa (2018–2019)
- (Argentina) Patricio Graff (2020)
- (Argentina) Dalcio Giovagnoli (2020–2021)
- (Chile) Miguel Ramírez (2021)
- (Argentina) Mariano Soso (2022)
- (Argentina) Pablo De Muner (2023)
- (Argentina) Juan Manuel Azconzábal (2023–2024)
- (Chile) Víctor Fuentes (2024)
- (Argentina) Francisco Meneghini (2024–2025)
- (Argentina) Lucas Bovaglio (2025–)

== Management ==
Owners of the club.
1. Inversiones Deportivas JCCM S.P.A (99.0%)
2. Matías Ahumada Rioja (1.00%)

The club has had 17 presidents throughout history. The first president of the institution was Francisco Rajcevich, who held the post between January and December 1955, while Patricio Mekis had the longest time period in charge of the institution (between January 1958 and January 1965) and is currently honorary president of the club.

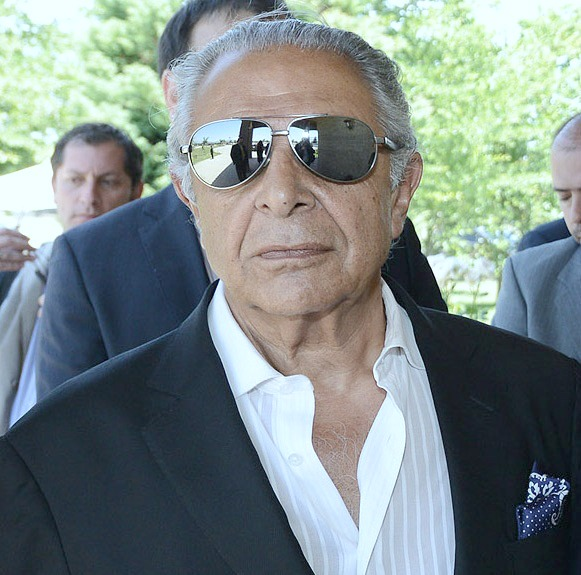
Ricardo Abumohor bought the club in 2005

Formerly in the corporation presidents elected the same 12 directors-leaders who take the time to divide the charges. In turn, the elected president must be accepted by a majority of members. This president was in principle intended to be the leader for two years, but after a year, when half-directory is renewed, 8 leaders who continue plus 8 new or re-elected decide whether the current president remains in charge or another is chosen.

In 2005, the club had three different presidents due to internal problems and economic problems facing the club. After this, Ricardo Abumohor purchases the club and takes the role of president.

Since July 2021, Pablo Hoffmann Yáñez was elected as the new president of the club, after leaving his position at the club vacant, despite remaining the club's largest shareholder.

In recent years, the Abumohor family has publicly expressed their desire to sell their shares in the club to attract new investors to take the club to the next level. Major sports business groups such as City Football Group, Grupo Caliente, or the Brazilian businessman Regis Marques, and the Chilean business woman Daniella Chávez have been in contact with the club regarding a sale, but nothing has materialized.

=== Current management staff ===
Position	Name
Owner	(Mexico) Grupo Caliente
President	(Chile) Pablo Hoffmann Yáñez
Director	(Argentina) (Chile) Matías Ahumada
Director	(Argentina) Christian Bragarnik
Director	(Argentina) Jorge Reina
Director	(Mexico) Jorge Hank
CEO	(Chile) Ricardo Boudon

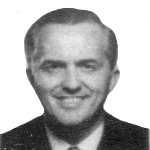
Patricio Mekis had the longest time period in charge with the institution.

=== Chronology of presidents ===
- 1955–56: Francisco Rajcevich
- 1957–58: Dionisio Valenzuela
- 1958–65: Patricio Mekis
- 1966–72: Alberto Musse
- 1973–75: Carlos Latife
- 1976–82: Alfonso Orueta
- 1983–88: Héctor Cortéz
- 1989–90: Óscar Albornoz
- 1991–92: Juan Romero
- 1992–93: Rodolfo Cueto
- 1994–96: Alex Acosta
- 1997: José Donoso
- 1997–00: Omar Pozo
- 2001–04: Francisco Arce
- 2005: Waldo Quiroz (interim)
- 2005: Daniel Sánchez
- 2005: Juan Carlos Latife
- 2006–2021: Ricardo Abumohor
- 2022–2025: Pablo Hoffmann
- 2026–: Matías Ahumada

== Club badge and colours ==
The current badge of the club is a phoenix over a pentagon with the colours white, yellow, and green. The colors remember the club colors of Instituto O'Higgins, América de Rancagua and O'Higgins Braden respectively. Several Rancaguan people affirm that the phoenix represents the Chilean historic city, in where the founding father and hero of the country, Bernardo O'Higgins, led his army to win the Battle of Rancagua against Spain, highlighting that the club's name is in honour of him and the name of the Province of O'Higgins in that time, then named Cachapoal Province.

The club's current home kit colours are sky blue and white in honor to the 1950 FIFA World Cup Uruguay national team title-winner, whilst the traditional away colours are yellow in honour of América, but in recent years the away kits have been white and black. In the 2010 Campeonato Petrobras, O'Higgins wore the former kit of O'Higgins Braden as away colours.

An unusual fact was that in the 2012 Torneo de Apertura first leg final at home against Universidad de Chile, the team played with the away kit colours in Rancagua, the city where the team is based.

The current home kit of the club consists of a sky blue shirt, black shorts and socks. The kit is manufactured by Spanish brand Joma, and the main sponsor is the betting site BC Game.

=== Current sponsors ===
- (Spain) Joma (kit manufacturer)
- (Curaçao) BC GAME (kit main sponsor)
- (Chile) Mall Patio Rancagua
- (Chile) Homecenter Sodimac
- (Chile) Universidad de O'Higgins
- (United States) Gatorade
- (Chile) Clínica MEDS
- (Chile) Difor

=== Current kits ===
The official team kit is currently produced by Spanish sports apparel company Joma.

Home	Home comb.	Away	Third	Goalkeeper 1	Goalkeeper 2	Goalkeeper 3

=== All-time kits ===
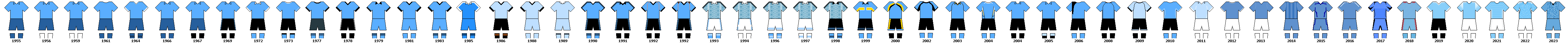
Chronology of home kits of the club (1955–2023).

=== Kit manufacturers and sponsors ===
Period	Kit manufacturer	Shirt main partner
1977	None	Turbus
1978–1986	None	Codelco
1987	Penalty	Codelco
1988–1991	Le Coq Sportif	Codelco
1991–1994	Adidas	Codelco
1995–1998	Adidas	Cerveza Cristal
1999	Uhlsport	Cerveza Cristal
2000–2001	Kelme	Cerveza Cristal
2002–2003	JCQ	Cerveza Cristal
2004	Uhlsport	Cerveza Cristal
2005	Training	Cerveza Cristal
2006	Lotto	Cerveza Cristal
2007–2008	Lotto	Productos Fernández

Period	Kit manufacturer	Shirt main partner
2009	Mitre	Productos Fernández
2010	Mitre	Agrosuper
2011	O'Higgins F.C. (own brand)	Agrosuper
2012	Diadora	Agrosuper
2013 (jan.-jun.)	Diadora	—N/a
2013 (jul.-dec.)	Diadora	TBF Global Sports
2014	Diadora	VTR
2015–2017	New Balance	VTR
2018	Adidas	VTR
2019–2021	Adidas	Sun Monticello
2022	Adidas	Latamwin
2023–2024	Joma	Latamwin
2025–	Joma	BC GAME

== Club culture ==
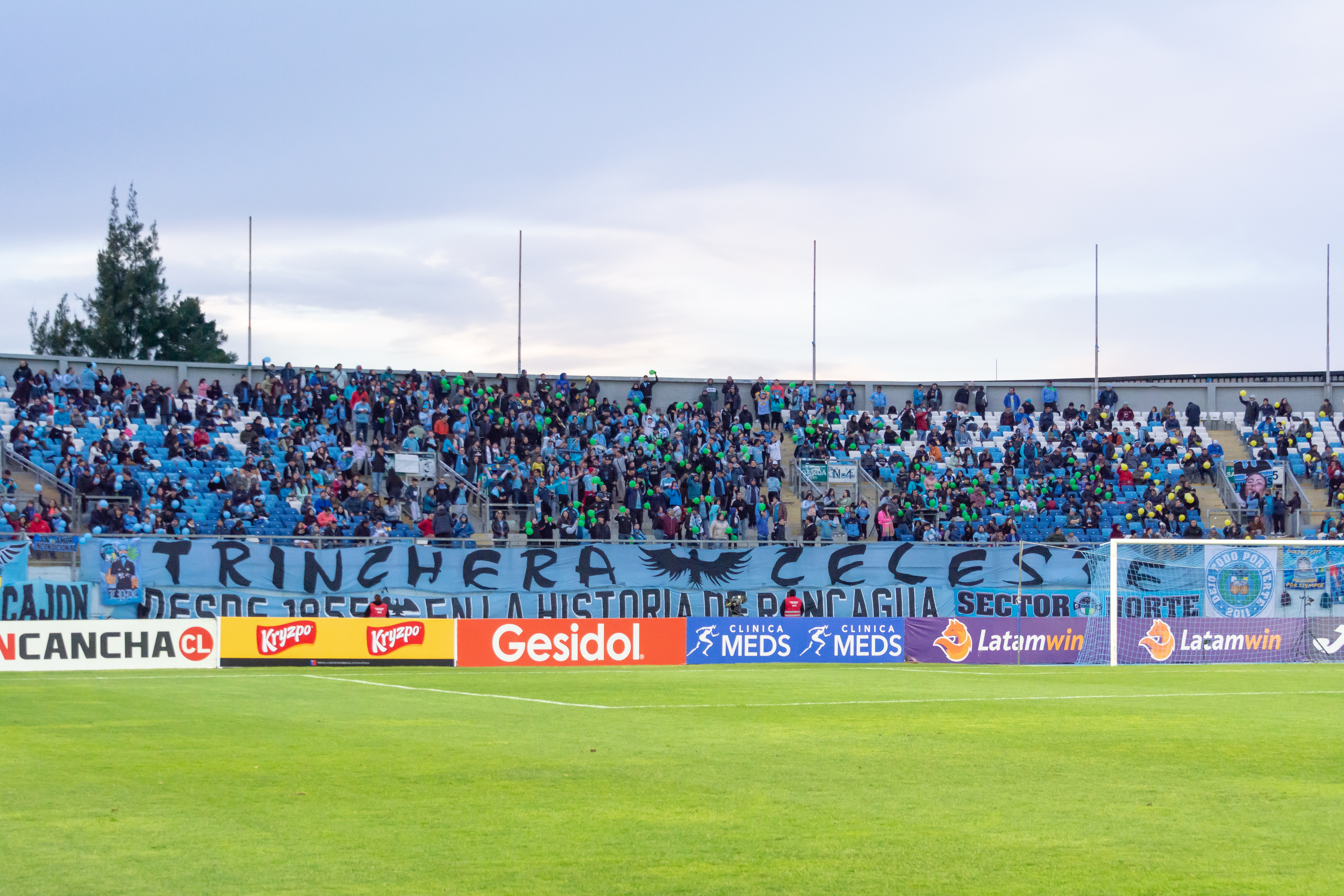
Trinchera Celeste

=== Supporter groups ===
- Trinchera Celeste (barra brava)
- Arca de Noé

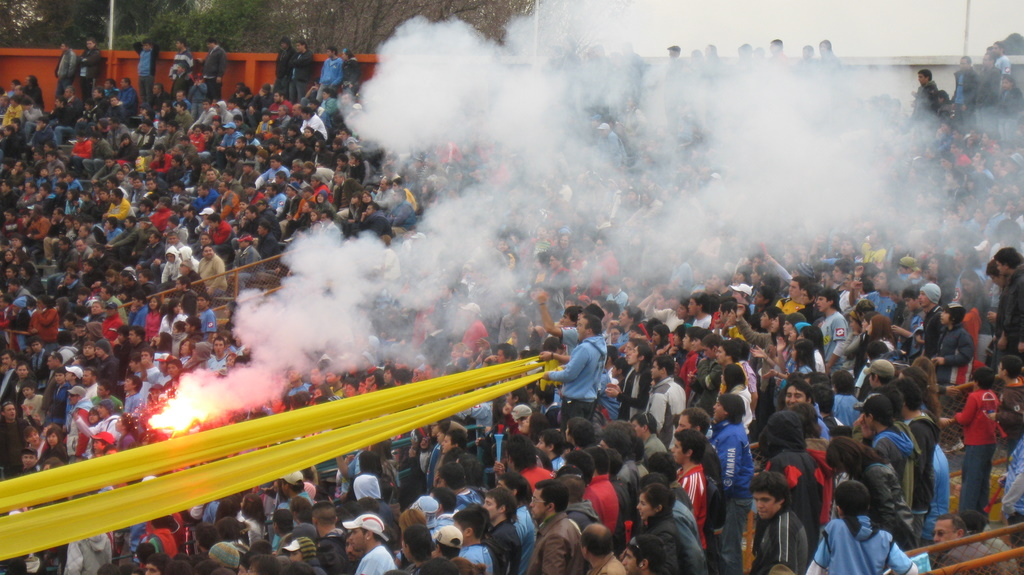
The tragedy affected members of the Trinchera Celeste.

=== Tomé Tragedy ===
On 9 February 2013, after the match between the club and Huachipato, a group of fans traveled in a bus to Tomé, where in the Cuesta Caracol fell into a ravine, causing the death of 16 fans. As a sign of solidarity, a minute of silence was carried out in the different leagues of the ANFP for matches played in the following days, and in Rancagua and Tomé a day of mourning was planned.

=== Rivalries ===
O'Higgins doesn't have a defined classic rival, but it has strong football rivalries with its neighbours in Santiago, Talca and Curicó. Colo-Colo, Universidad de Chile and Universidad Católica are the teams with which it shares a good rivalry due to the proximity between Rancagua and Santiago, in addition to the popularity of the Santiago teams, which extends to the city of Rancagua as well.

In recent years, it has also maintained a strong rivalry with its nearby Curicó Unido, due to some extra-football conflicts between its supporters (linked to the Tomé Tragedy), becoming notorious for the clashes in the national tournament and the proximity between the cities of Rancagua and Curicó. The club also has a strong rivalry with Rangers de Talca, being the closest professional team in the southern direction of Chile.

=== Friendships ===
==== Huachipato ====
The relationship between Huachipato and O'Higgins de Rancagua was strengthened following the deaths of sixteen O'Higgins supporters in a traffic accident in Tomé after a Campeonato Nacional match in 2013. The event contributed to closer ties between supporters and members of the two clubs.

Both clubs, united by grief, have organized various tributes and displays of solidarity. From shirt exchanges to minutes of silence in stadiums, Huachipato and O'Higgins have shown that sporting rivalry can give way to a deep human connection.

==== Sligo Rovers ====
Sligo Rovers, an Irish football club and O'Higgins de Rancagua, two football teams seemingly geographically distant, share a special bond forged by history. This connection is due to the figure of Ambrosio O'Higgins, who was born in Sligo, Ireland, and whose son, Bernardo O'Higgins, was a prominent leader in the independence of Chile.

This historical legacy has served as a bridge between both clubs, establishing a relationship of friendship and mutual admiration. Visits from ambassadors, exchanges of shirts and public recognition have marked this connection, which transcends borders and different leagues.

=== Anthem ===
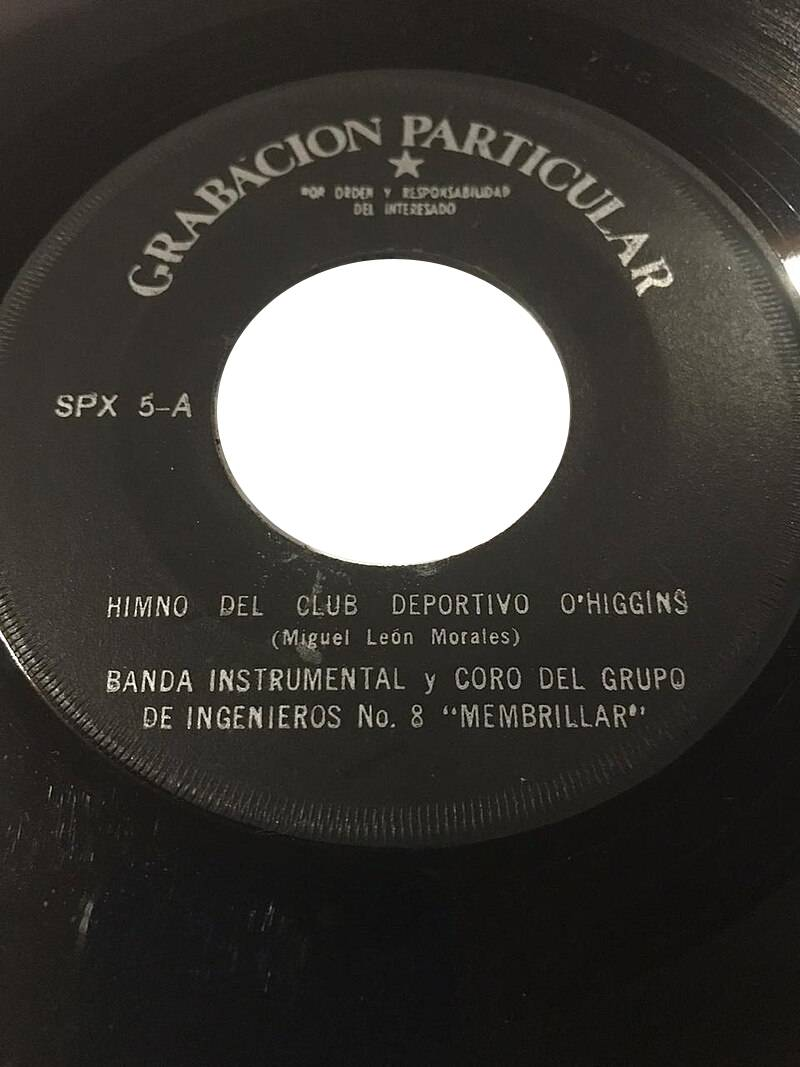
Image of the original vinyl.

The anthem was created at the end of 1955. The club's identity in the city of Rancagua was such that the board of directors at the time considered it necessary to complete these symbols with the composition of an institutional anthem. The negotiations led to the band and choir of the Regimiento Militar Membrillar, a group accustomed to performing in the city and other communes of the province. At that time, a song was created that is part of the melody alluding to the sky blue team. The author was a young man from Rancagua named Miguel Ángel León Morales, who, in addition to being a fan of the team, left his mark by writing the lyrics.

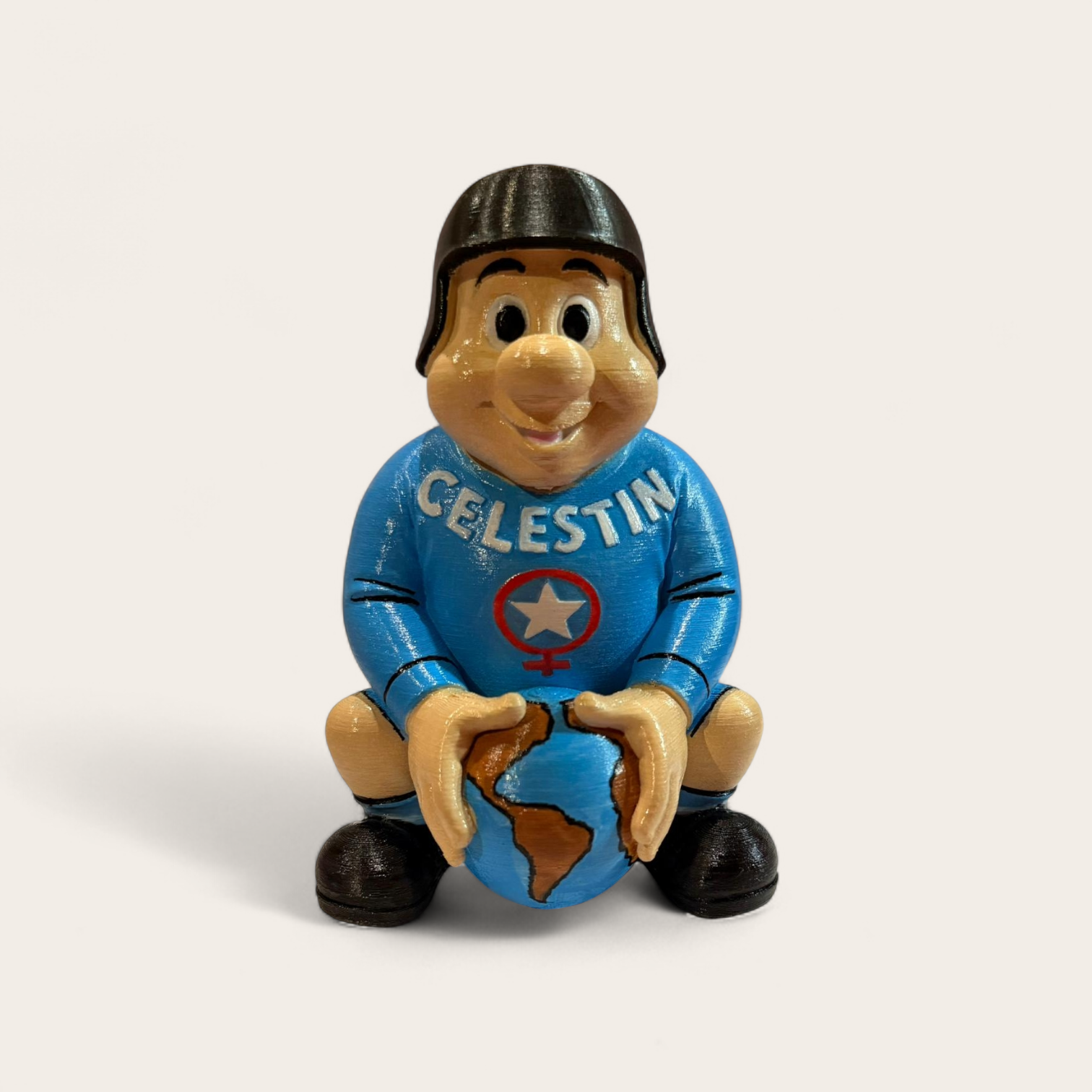
Celestín presented in its 2025 version.

The board of directors, which at that time was composed of Francisco Rajcevich and Patricio Mekis, were the ones who called Miguel Ángel León. He arrived with the band to Calle Brasil in the city. After long days and the approval of the board of directors, it is now the club's current anthem. Among its lyrics was created the mythical O'Hi-O'Hi, Ra-Ra!, a battle cry that since then has been heard by its fans in the stands of all the stadiums in Chile and in international competitions where the team participates.

=== Mascot ===
Celestín was the iconic mascot of the club, a miner character with a helmet who represented the origins of the club linked to the mining of El Teniente, created by Guillermo Valdivia in the 70s, even leading the youth group "Clan Celestín" and being a beloved symbol for the sky blue fans.

He made a historic reappearance on the last week of the Campeonato 2026 in the match against Everton, where O'Higgins with a last-minute goal by Francisco González achieved qualification for the 2026 Copa Libertadores, being a main part of the commemorative jersey of the qualification along with the phrase VolVImos (We returned in Spanish) stylized with the "VI" representing the sixth Roman numeral referring to the name of the O'Higgins Region.

== Club details ==
=== All-time statistics ===
This table includes only results pertaining to the Campeonato Nacional and the Primera B, separated by year of the realization of the tournament, as well as the different rounds that had tournaments.

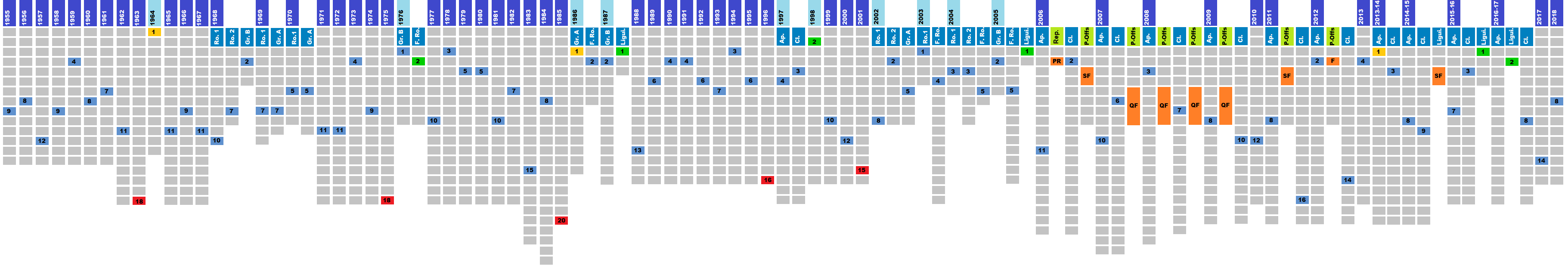
All-time stats of the club (1955–2018).

Campeonato Nacional	Primera B	Champions	Elimination on Play-offs	Promoted	Relegated

=== Results ===
==== Overview ====
Last updated: Campeonato Nacional 2024 and Copa Chile 2024

Club	S	T	P	W	D	L	GF	GA	GD	Pts
Liga de Primera ^{[note]}	61	72	1928	690	532	706	2735	2810	−75	2207
Primera B ^{[note]}	10	10	347	164	106	87	577	442	+155	533
Copa Chile ^{[note]}	41	41	348	142	96	111	577	510	+67	522
Copa de la Liga	1	TBD	TBD	TBD	TBD	TBD	TBD	TBD	TBD	TBD
Total	98	109	2418	933	686	819	3665	3488	+216	2924

1. 1955–63, 1965–75, 1977–85, 1988–96, 1999–01, 2006–
2. 1964, 1976, 1986–87, 1997–98, 2002–05
3. Did not participate in the years 1986, 1987, 1998

=== International record ===
In his history, the club has qualified for eight international tournaments, including four times in Copa Libertadores, thrice in Copa Sudamericana and once in the Copa Conmebol.

==== Overview ====
Last updated: 20 March 2026.

Competition	S	P	W	D	L	GF	GA	GD
Copa Libertadores	5	30	7	10	15	30	37	−7
Copa Sudamericana	3	6	1	3	2	4	9	−5
Copa Conmebol	1	2	0	1	1	0	2	−2
Total	9	38	8	14	18	34	48	−14

==== Matches ====
Season	Competition	Round	Country	Club	City visited	Home	Away	Aggregate
1979	Copa Libertadores	Group 4	Chile	Palestino	Santiago de Chile	1–1	0–1 ^{[a]}	2nd place (eliminated)
1979	Copa Libertadores	Group 4	Venezuela	Portuguesa	Valencia	1–1	1–1	2nd place (eliminated)
1979	Copa Libertadores	Group 4	Venezuela	Deportivo Galicia	Caracas	6–0	1–0	2nd place (eliminated)
1980	Copa Libertadores	Group 5	Paraguay	Cerro Porteño	Asunción	0–0	0–1	1st place (qualified)
1980	Copa Libertadores	Group 5	Chile	Colo-Colo	Santiago de Chile	1–1	1–3 ^{[a]}	1st place (qualified)
1980	Copa Libertadores	Group 5	Paraguay	Sol de América	Asunción	2–0	4–1	1st place (qualified)
1980	Copa Libertadores	Semi-final	Uruguay	Nacional	Montevideo	0–1 ^{[a]}	0–2	3rd place (eliminated)
1980	Copa Libertadores	Semi-final	Paraguay	Olimpia	Asunción	0–1 ^{[a]}	0–2	3rd place (eliminated)
1984	Copa Libertadores	Group 2	Chile	Universidad Católica	Santiago de Chile	0–2	0–2 ^{[b]}	4th place (eliminated)
1984	Copa Libertadores	Group 2	Bolivia	Blooming	Santa Cruz de la Sierra	3–4	2–3	4th place (eliminated)
1984	Copa Libertadores	Group 2	Bolivia	Bolívar	La Paz	0–0	1–5	4th place (eliminated)
1992	Copa CONMEBOL	First round	Argentina	Gimnasia y Esgrima	Buenos Aires	0–0	0–2	0–2
2012	Copa Sudamericana	First round	Paraguay	Cerro Porteño	Asunción	3–3	0–4	3–7
2014	Copa Libertadores	Group 3	Argentina	Lanús	Buenos Aires	0–0	0–0	3rd place (eliminated)
2014	Copa Libertadores	Group 3	Colombia	Deportivo Cali	Cali	1–0 ^{[c]}	1–1	3rd place (eliminated)
2014	Copa Libertadores	Group 3	Paraguay	Cerro Porteño	Asunción	2–2 ^{[c]}	1–2	3rd place (eliminated)
2016	Copa Sudamericana	First round	Uruguay	Montevideo Wanderers	Montevideo	0–0	0–0	0–0 (4–5 p.)
2017	Copa Sudamericana	First round	Ecuador	Fuerza Amarilla	Guayaquil	1–0	0–2 ^{[d]}	1–2
2026	Copa Libertadores	Second stage	Brazil	Bahia	Salvador do Bahia	1–0	1–2	2–2 (4–3 p.)
2026	Copa Libertadores	Third stage	Colombia	Deportes Tolima	Ibagué	1–0	0–2	1–2
2026	Copa Sudamericana	Group C	Brazil	São Paulo	São Paulo	0–0	0–2	2nd place (qualified)
2026	Copa Sudamericana	Group C	Colombia	Millonarios	Bogotá	2–0	2–1	2nd place (qualified)
2026	Copa Sudamericana	Group C	Uruguay	Boston River	Montevideo	2–0	2–3 ^{[e]}	2nd place (qualified)
2026	Copa Sudamericana	Knockout round play-offs	Argentina	Boca Juniors	Buenos Aires	1–0	0–1	1–1 (3–4 p.)

1. Matches played in the Estadio Nacional de Chile due to attendance CONMEBOL requirements.
2. Match played in the Estadio Santa Laura, home of Universidad Católica between 1984 and 1987.
3. Matches played in the Estadio Monumental David Arellano due to Estadio El Teniente's remodelation.
4. Match played in the Estadio George Capwell due to attendance CONMEBOL requirements.
4. Match played in the Estadio Centenario due to attendance CONMEBOL requirements.

=== Current rankings ===
==== IFFHS ranking ====
As of 30 December 2025

Rank	Country	Team	Points
493	(Ecuador)	Libertad	57
493	(Chile)	Deportes Iquique	57
493	(Chile)	O'Higgins	57
493	(Spain)	Leganés	57
493	(Northern Ireland)	Dungannon Swifts	57

==== CONMEBOL ranking ====
As of 30 December 2025

Rank	Country	Team	Points
164	(Peru)	Ayacucho	117.9
165	(Uruguay)	General Caballero	114.9
166	(Chile)	O'Higgins	114.5
167	(Venezuela)	Deportivo Galicia	100.0
167	(Venezuela)	Minervén	100.0

== Affiliated clubs ==
- (England) Chelsea
- (France) OGC Nice

== Honours ==
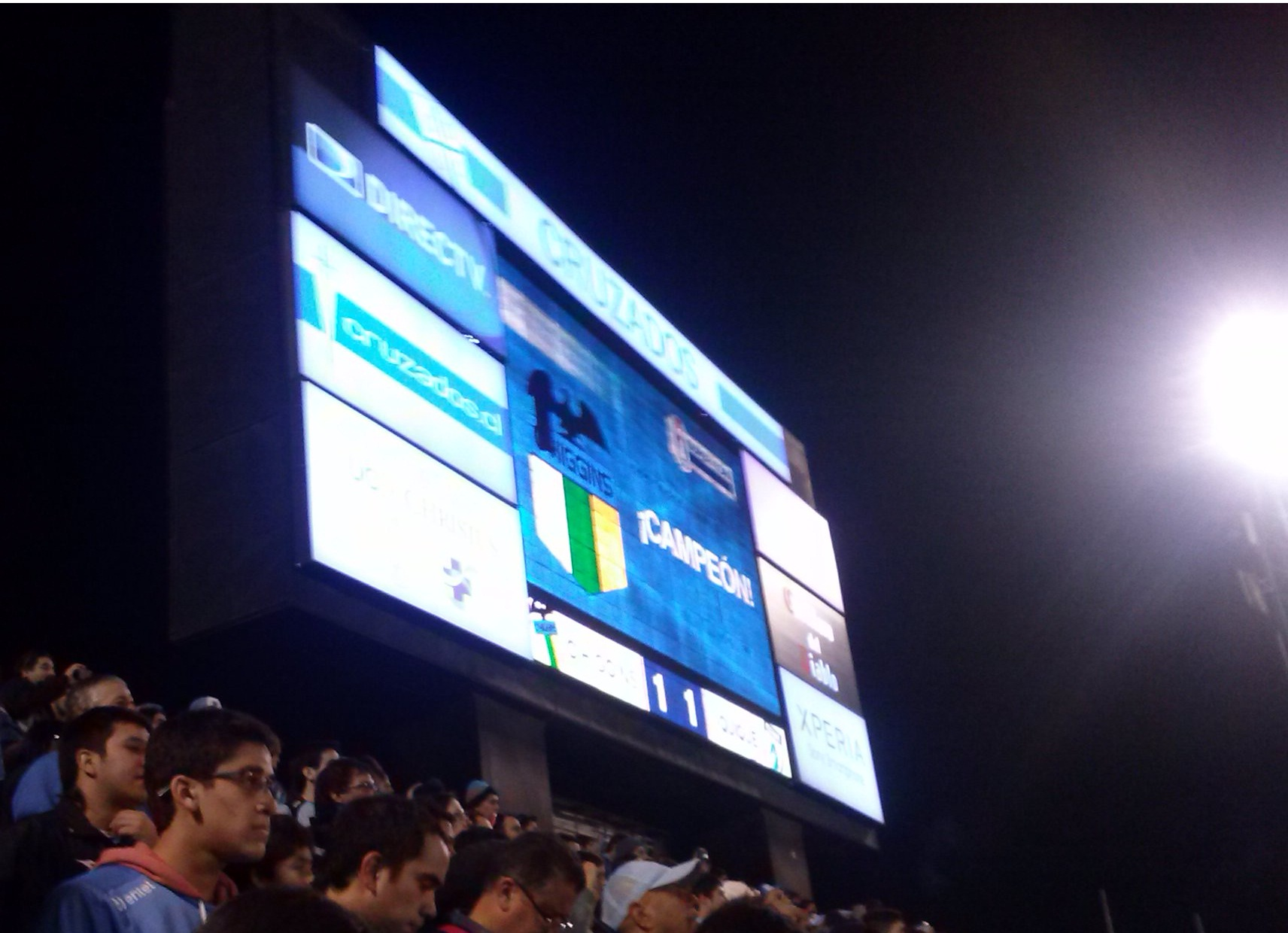
O'Higgins announced as champion at the 2014 Supercopa de Chile.

O'Higgins honours
Type	Competition	Titles	Seasons
National	Primera División	1	2013-A
National	Supercopa de Chile	1	2014
National	Primera B de Chile	1	1964
National	Copa Apertura Segunda División	1	1986
