= 2013 O'Higgins F.C. season =

O'Higgins F.C.
2013 season
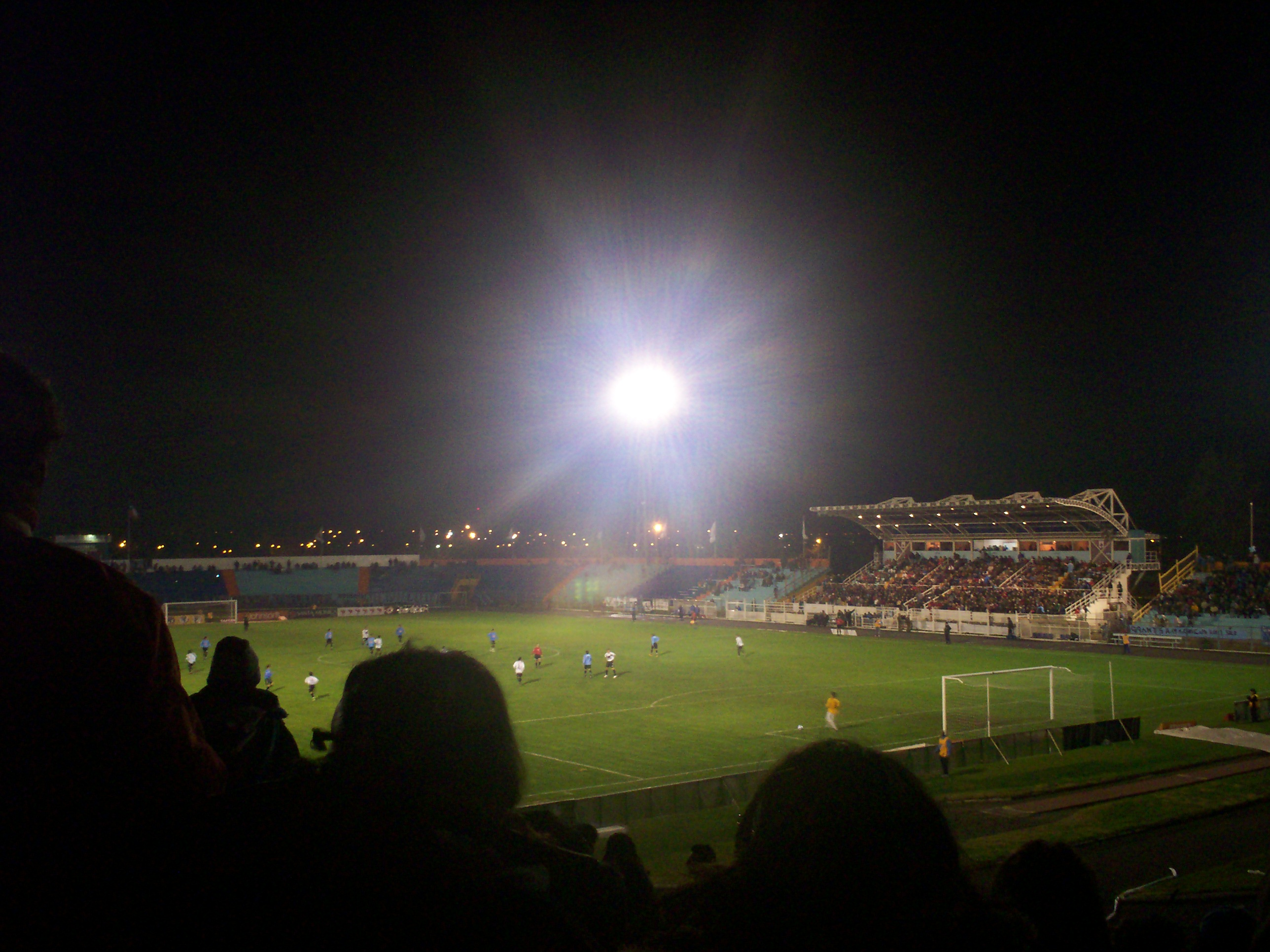
- The Estadio El Teniente was closed in this season to start its renovation process.
- President: (Chile) Ricardo Abumohor
- Manager: (Argentina) Eduardo Berizzo
- Stadium: Estadio El Teniente (until February); Estadio La Granja (from March)
- Transición: 4th
- Copa Chile: Quarterfinals
- Top goalscorer: League: Pablo Calandria (6 goals); All: Boris Sagredo (8 goals)
Home colours	Away colours

The 2013 O'Higgins F.C. season is O'Higgins F.C.'s 50th season in the Primera División and their seventh consecutive season in Primera División. The club plays in two tournaments: The 2013 Primera División of Chile season and the Copa Chile.

Until February 2013, O'Higgins played its home matches at the Estadio El Teniente in Rancagua. On 19 February, the stadium was closed in order to begin its renovation process. The stadium will be expanded to 15,000 seats and is set to be a host venue for the 2015 Copa América. Meanwhile, O'Higgins will use the Estadio La Granja in Curicó as a temporary venue for home matches. Apart from this, the team played 2 of its home matches in Santiago.

O'Higgins finished the Torneo Transición in 4th position, having big chances of reaching the title until the end of the season. The club enlist this season as "a prelude" for the title won at the 2013–14 Torneo Apertura in late 2013. In Copa Chile, the team eliminated Colo-Colo and managed to reach the Quarterfinals, where they lost to Cobreloa by a single goal.

The season covers the period from 1 January to 31 May 2013. This article also includes the Copa Chile, despite the competition started on 23 June 2012, as the team progressed to the knockout stages that were held during this season.

== Friendly matches ==
Win Draw Loss

7 January 2013 Friendly	O'Higgins	1–1	(Peru) Universidad César Vallejo	Rancagua
20:00	Huerta (yellow card) 20'; Escobar 22'	Report	Morales (yellow card) 17'; Contreras 29'	Stadium: Estadio El Teniente; Attendance: 4,700; Referee: Manuel Acosta

13 January 2013 Noche Celeste	O'Higgins	3–0	Rangers	Rancagua
17:30	Rojas; Huerta	Report		Stadium: Estadio El Teniente; Attendance: 3,600

17 April 2013 Noche Naranja	CDS Enfoque	1–3	O'Higgins	Rancagua
18:45	I. Ramírez 70'	Report	Lizana 20', 50'; Órdenes	Stadium: Estadio Municipal

== Torneo Transición ==
=== League table ===
Pos	Team	Pld	W	D	L	GF	GA	GD	Pts	Qualification
2	Universidad Católica	17	12	2	3	36	19	+17	38	2013 Copa Sudamericana first stage
3	Cobreloa	17	9	7	1	33	18	+15	34	2013 Copa Sudamericana first stage
4	O'Higgins	17	9	4	4	28	19	+9	31	
5	Universidad de Chile	17	9	3	5	37	29	+8	30	2013 Copa Sudamericana first stage (Note: Universidad de Chile qualified for the 2013 Copa Sudamericana by winning the 2012–13 Copa Chile.)
6	Everton	17	8	3	6	25	24	+1	27	

Source: Asociación Nacional de Fútbol Profesional
Rules for classification: 1st points; 2nd wins; 3rd goal difference; 4th goals scored; 5th away goals; 6th red cards; 7th yellow cards; 8th draw.

=== Results summary ===
Overall								Home						Away					
Pld	W	D	L	GF	GA	GD	Pts	W	D	L	GF	GA	GD	W	D	L	GF	GA	GD
17	9	4	4	28	19	+9	31	4	3	2	15	11	+4	5	1	2	13	8	+5

Source: cdf.cl

=== Result round by round ===
Round	1	2	3	4	5	6	7	8	9	10	11	12	13	14	15	16	17
Ground	H	H	A	H	A	H	A	H	A	H	A	H	A	H	A	A	H
Result	L	W	W	W	D	W	W	W	L	D	W	D	W	D	W	L	L
Position	14	7	5	3	4	3	2	2	3	3	3	4	1	3	3	3	4

Source: cdf.cl
A = Away; H = Home; W = Win; D = Draw; L = Loss

=== Matches ===
27 January 2013 1	O'Higgins	0–1	Universidad Católica	Rancagua
18:30		Report	Peralta 30'	Stadium: Estadio El Teniente; Attendance: 6,042; Referee: Eduardo Gamboa

2 February 2013 2	O'Higgins	2–0	Santiago Wanderers	Rancagua
18:30	Calandria 71'; Rojas 83'	Report		Stadium: Estadio El Teniente; Attendance: 6,261; Referee: Claudio Puga

9 February 2013 3	Huachipato	0–2	O'Higgins	Talcahuano
22:00		Report	Barriga 26'; Rojas 61'	Stadium: Estadio CAP; Attendance: 2,862; Referee: Eduardo Gamboa

15 February 2013 4	O'Higgins	3–2	Palestino	Rancagua
18:30	Escalona 19' (o.g.); Cuevas (red card) 80'; Sagredo 83'; Calandria 87'	Report	Silva 15', 62'; Escalona (red card) 70'	Stadium: Estadio El Teniente; Attendance: 8,562; Referee: Jorge Osorio

22 February 2013 5	Ñublense	1–1	O'Higgins	Chillán
19:30	Lima (red card) 13'; Grbec 15'	Report	Barriga 13'; Sagredo (red card) 65'	Stadium: Estadio Nelson Oyarzún; Attendance: 4,801; Referee: Patricio Blanca

2 March 2013 6	O'Higgins	3–1	Audax Italiano	Curicó
18:00	Figueroa 25'; Calandria 80' (pen.); Rojas 90'	Report	García 16'	Stadium: Estadio La Granja; Attendance: 2,688; Referee: Claudio Puga

10 March 2013 7	Deportes Antofagasta	1–3	O'Higgins	Antofagasta
16:00	Elizondo 64'; J. L. González (red card) 70'	Report	Calandria 36', 79'; Acosta 87'	Stadium: Parque Juan López; Attendance: 2,518; Referee: Eduardo Gamboa

15 March 2013 8	O'Higgins	2–1	San Marcos de Arica	Curicó
22:00	Calandria 67'; Sagredo 79'	Report	Scoppa 49'	Stadium: Estadio La Granja; Attendance: 2,755; Referee: Christian Rojas

30 March 2013 9	Everton	2–0	O'Higgins	Quillota
15:30	Barrios 81'; Muñoz 90+2'	Report		Stadium: Estadio Lucio Fariña; Attendance: 5,798; Referee: Cristián Andaur

6 April 2013 10	O'Higgins	2–2	Cobresal	Curicó
20:30	Uglessich 33', 41'	Report	Fuentes 4'; Pineda 90+4'	Stadium: Estadio La Granja; Attendance: 2,967; Referee: Patricio Polic

13 April 2013 11	Rangers	1–2	O'Higgins	Talca
19:30	Lorca 53'	Report	Leal 77'; Escobar 90'	Stadium: Estadio Fiscal; Attendance: 3,105; Referee: Patricio Blanca

20 April 2013 12	O'Higgins	2–2	Universidad de Chile	Independencia, Santiago
15:30	Escobar 21'; Leal 57' (pen.)	Report	Díaz 46', 71'	Stadium: Estadio Santa Laura; Attendance: 8,362; Referee: Eduardo Gamboa

26 April 2013 13	Unión Española	0–2	O'Higgins	Independencia, Santiago
20:00		Report	Escobar 18'; Figueroa 56'	Stadium: Estadio Santa Laura; Attendance: 7,181; Referee: Manuel Acosta

3 May 2013 14	O'Higgins	1–1	Cobreloa	Curicó
20:00	Barriga 81'	Report	P. González 59'	Stadium: Estadio La Granja; Attendance: 7,154; Referee: Jorge Osorio

12 May 2013 15	Colo-Colo	1–2	O'Higgins	Macul, Santiago
18:00	Pavez 88'	Report	Barriga 11'; Rojas 18'	Stadium: Estadio Monumental; Attendance: 9,002; Referee: Carlos Ulloa

19 May 2013 16	Deportes Iquique	2–1	O'Higgins	Iquique
16:00	Villalobos 71'; Bogado 90+2'	Report	Calandria 74'; Uglessich (red card) 81'	Stadium: Tierra de Campeones; Attendance: 3,154; Referee: Claudio Puga

25 May 2013 17	O'Higgins	0–1	Unión La Calera	Macul, Santiago
16:00		Report	Farfán 72'	Stadium: Estadio Monumental; Attendance: 2,974; Referee: Julio Bascuñán

== Copa Chile ==
=== Group stage ===
Team	Pld	W	D	L	GF	GA	GD	Pts	OHIG	RANG	DCOL	SANU
O'Higgins	6	4	1	1	15	4	+11	13		0–1	1–1	7–0
Rangers	6	3	1	2	8	7	+1	10	1–3		1–1	3–1
Deportes Colchagua	6	2	3	1	7	5	+2	9	0–2	2–0		2–0
San Antonio Unido	6	0	1	5	3	17	−14	1	1–2	0–2	1–1	

5 September 2012 Matchday 1	Deportes Colchagua	0–2	O'Higgins	San Fernando
17:00		Report	Pérez 46'; Escobar 73'	Stadium: Estadio Jorge Silva Valenzuela; Attendance: 4,967; Referee: Francisco Caamaño

9 September 2012 Matchday 2	O'Higgins	0–1	Rangers	Rancagua
16:00			Ojeda 27'	Stadium: Estadio El Teniente; Attendance: 5,349; Referee: Jorge Osorio

12 September 2012 Matchday 3	O'Higgins	1–1	Deportes Colchagua	Rancagua
19:30	Ross 34'	Report	Muñoz 29'	Stadium: Estadio El Teniente; Attendance: 9,427; Referee: Marcelo Miranda

3 October 2012 Matchday 4	San Antonio Unido	1–2	O'Higgins	El Quisco
	Tapia 35'	Report	Sagredo 82'; Meneses 87'	Stadium: Estadio Municipal; Attendance: 1,006; Referee: Marcelo Miranda

10 October 2012 Matchday 5	O'Higgins	7–0	San Antonio Unido	Rancagua
	Pérez 16', 37'; Sagredo 17', 29'; Silva 50'; Fernández 52'; Ross 87'	Report		Stadium: Estadio El Teniente; Attendance: 2,517; Referee: Ángelo Hermosilla

13 October 2012 Matchday 6	Rangers	1–3	O'Higgins	Talca
18:00	Silva 63'	Report	Sagredo 5', 15'; Fernández 77'	Stadium: Estadio Fiscal; Attendance: 5,096; Referee: Manuel Acosta

=== Knockout stage ===
Round of 16

7 November 2012 Leg 1	Colo-Colo	3–1	O'Higgins	Macul, Santiago
19:00	Pineda 56'; Olivi 63'; Fuenzalida 89'	Report	Blanco 69'; Saavedra (red card) 81'	Stadium: Estadio Monumental; Attendance: 4,911; Referee: Carlos Ulloa

17 November 2012 Leg 2	O'Higgins	5–1 (6–4 agg.)	Colo-Colo	Rancagua
16:00	Sagredo 21'; Figueroa 44', 67'; Fernández 51'; Blanco 82'	Report	Pineda 19' (red card) 90+3'	Stadium: Estadio El Teniente; Attendance: 11,387; Referee: Claudio Puga

Quarterfinals

20 January 2013 Leg 1	Cobreloa	2–1	O'Higgins	Calama
16:00	Vidal 4' (o.g.); Cuéllar 25'	Report	Calandria 58'	Stadium: Estadio Municipal de Calama; Attendance: 2,051; Referee: Manuel Acosta

24 January 2013 Leg 2	O'Higgins	2–2 (3–4 agg.)	Cobreloa	Rancagua
19:30	Calandria 74', 90+4'	Report	Pol 20'; Pizarro 71'; Catrileo (red card) 81'	Stadium: Estadio El Teniente; Attendance: 3,680; Referee: Cristián Andaur
