= O'Higgins F.C. Fútbol Joven =

Chilean football club

O'Higgins
- Full name: O'Higgins Fútbol Club
- Nickname: Los Capitos
- Founded: 7 April 1955; 71 years ago as Club Deportivo O'Higgins
- Ground: Monasterio Celeste, Rancagua, Chile
- Capacity: 500
- Main Manager: Fernando Vergara
- League: Fútbol Joven de Chile – Serie de Oro
- Website: www.ohigginsfc.cl
Home colours	Away colours

O'Higgins F.C. Fútbol Joven are the youth teams of O'Higgins. They currently play in the Fútbol Joven de Chile, the highest level of youth football in Chile. The club enter teams Under-9 to Under-19 in the leagues. The club is part of the Serie de Oro in the General Table of the tournament.

== History ==
Since 2006, when O'Higgins reached the promotion for the Primera División. Different generations of the club's youth teams have given favorable results, helping it gain status as a formator club in the country, with players like Aníbal González, Nelson Tapia, and Joel Molina.

As a result, many players have left the club to play for other teams, such as Luis Casanova who currently plays in Unión Española, and Cristian Cuevas who was a buy for the English club Chelsea in $2.6 million, after his participation in the 2013 Torneo de Transición and in the 2013 South American Youth Championship. But also the club maintained many players in the current first-team, such as Bastián San Juan, Saúl Flores, Santiago Lizana, Felipe Ochagavía, Benjamín Vidal, Cristhian Venegas, and Cristian Araya.

On 26 July 2013, the U-17 will participate in the 2013 Milk Cup, on the Group 4 in the Premier Section, when their group will play against the English clubs Newcastle United and Liverpool F.C., and against the home club County Armagh. This is the first tournament appearance of the club, and the first time of the club playing in Europe. On the 2014 edition, the club finished in the fourth place in the Junior Category, after lose against Plymouth Argyle in the third-place match. On the 2015 edition, the club won the Globe Cup in the Premier Category, after draw with Motherwell (2–2) and beating Vendée (1–0), Orange County Blues (3–0), Málaga (3–0), and Newcastle United (2–0) in the final, finishing fifth in the final table.

== Teams ==
=== Youth teams ===
- Under-19
- Under-18
- Under-17
- Under-16
- Under-15

=== Child's teams ===
- Under-14
- Under-13
- Under-12
- Under-11
- Under-10
- Under-9

== Honours ==
=== Domestic ===
Primera División

- Fútbol Joven Under-15 (2): 2014 Apertura, 2014 Clausura
- Fútbol Joven Under-13 (2): 2012 Clausura, 2014 Clausura
- Fútbol Joven Under-12 (1): 2010

Copa Chile

- Copa Chile Under-18 (2): 2009, 2011

=== International ===
Milk Cup

- Premier Cup (1): 2016
- Globe Cup (1): 2015

==== International competitions ====
Milk Cup

- Milk Cup (3): 2013, 2014, 2015, 2016
