= 2014 Supercopa de Chile =

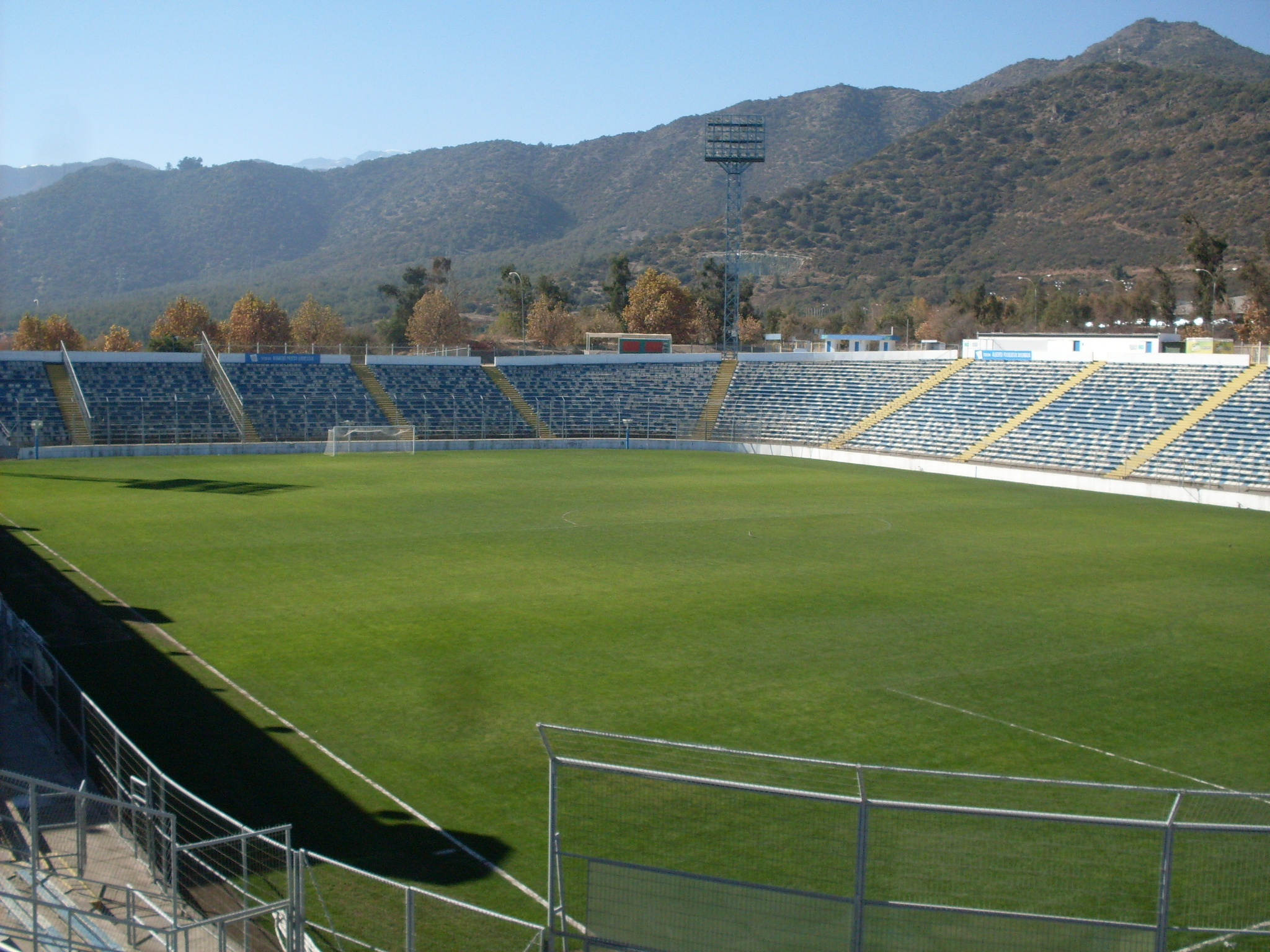
- Event: Supercopa de Chile 2014
O'Higgins	Deportes Iquique
1	1
- O'Higgins won 3–2 on penalties
- Date: 3 May 2014
- Venue: Estadio San Carlos de Apoquindo, Santiago
- CDF Man of the Match: Rodrigo Naranjo
- Easy Man of the Match: Rodrigo Naranjo
- Referee: Roberto Tobar
- Attendance: 7,000
- Weather: Clear; 20 °C (68 °F)

The 2014 Supercopa de Chile was the second edition of this championship organised by the Asociación Nacional de Fútbol Profesional (ANFP).

The match was played between the 2013–14 Primera División Best-Champions O'Higgins, and the 2013–14 Copa Chile Winners Deportes Iquique.

O'Higgins won its first Supercopa in his history, winning 3–2 on penalties, after a 1–1 draw at the end of 120 minutes with goals of Rodrigo Díaz for Iquique and Luis Pedro Figueroa for O'Higgins.

== Match ==
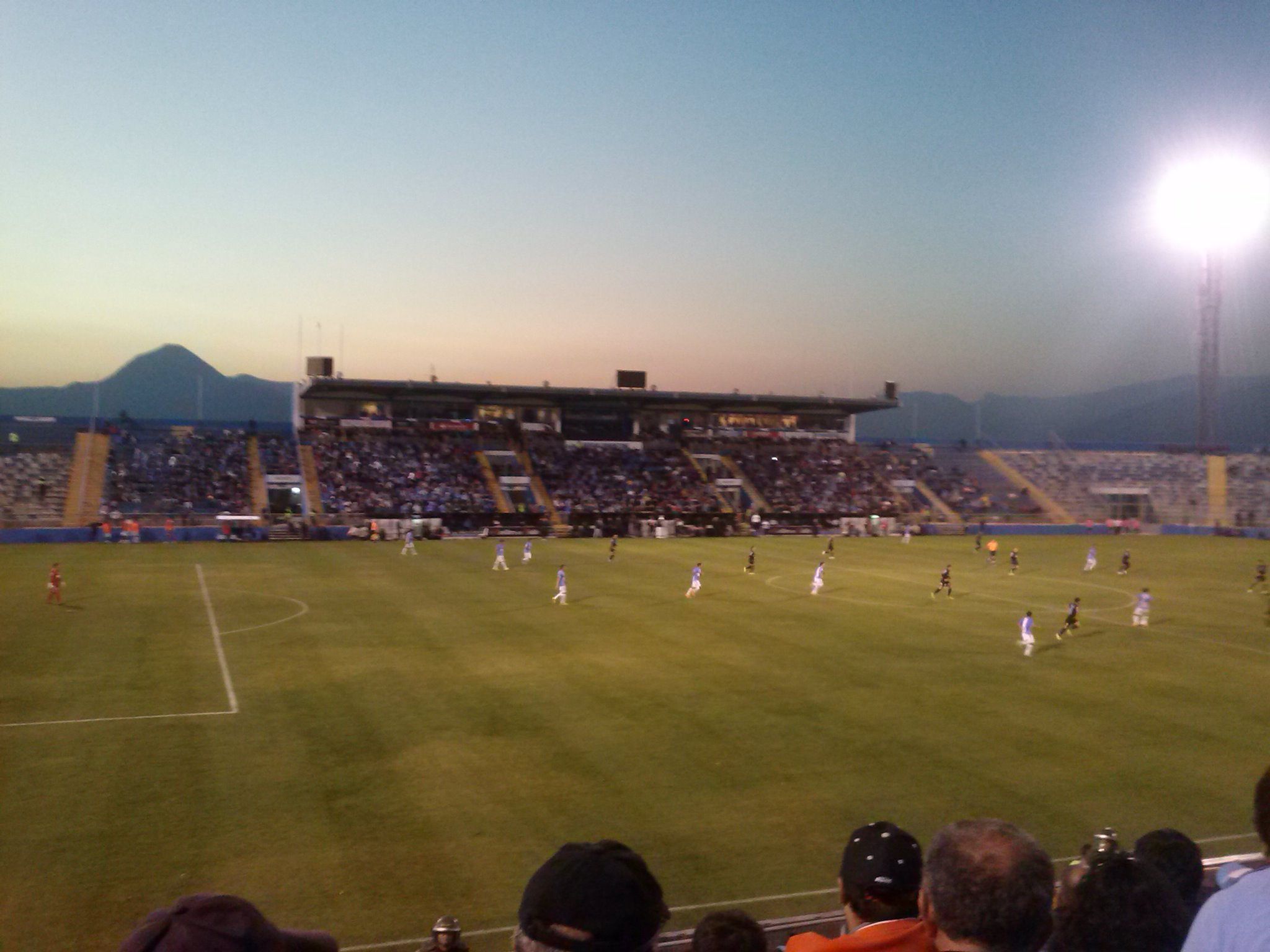
The match at the Estadio San Carlos de Apoquindo during the second half.

The match was disputed at Estadio San Carlos de Apoquindo in Santiago as a neutral stadium, and the referee chosen for the match was Roberto Tobar.

In the first half, Rodrigo Díaz scored to make it 1–0 for Iquique at the 5th minute. At minute 8', O'Higgins striker Pablo Calandria suffered a ruptured cruciate ligament, making a substitution for Diego Cháves. Later in the 38' Luis Pedro Figueroa scored for O'Higgins to level the game at 1–1.

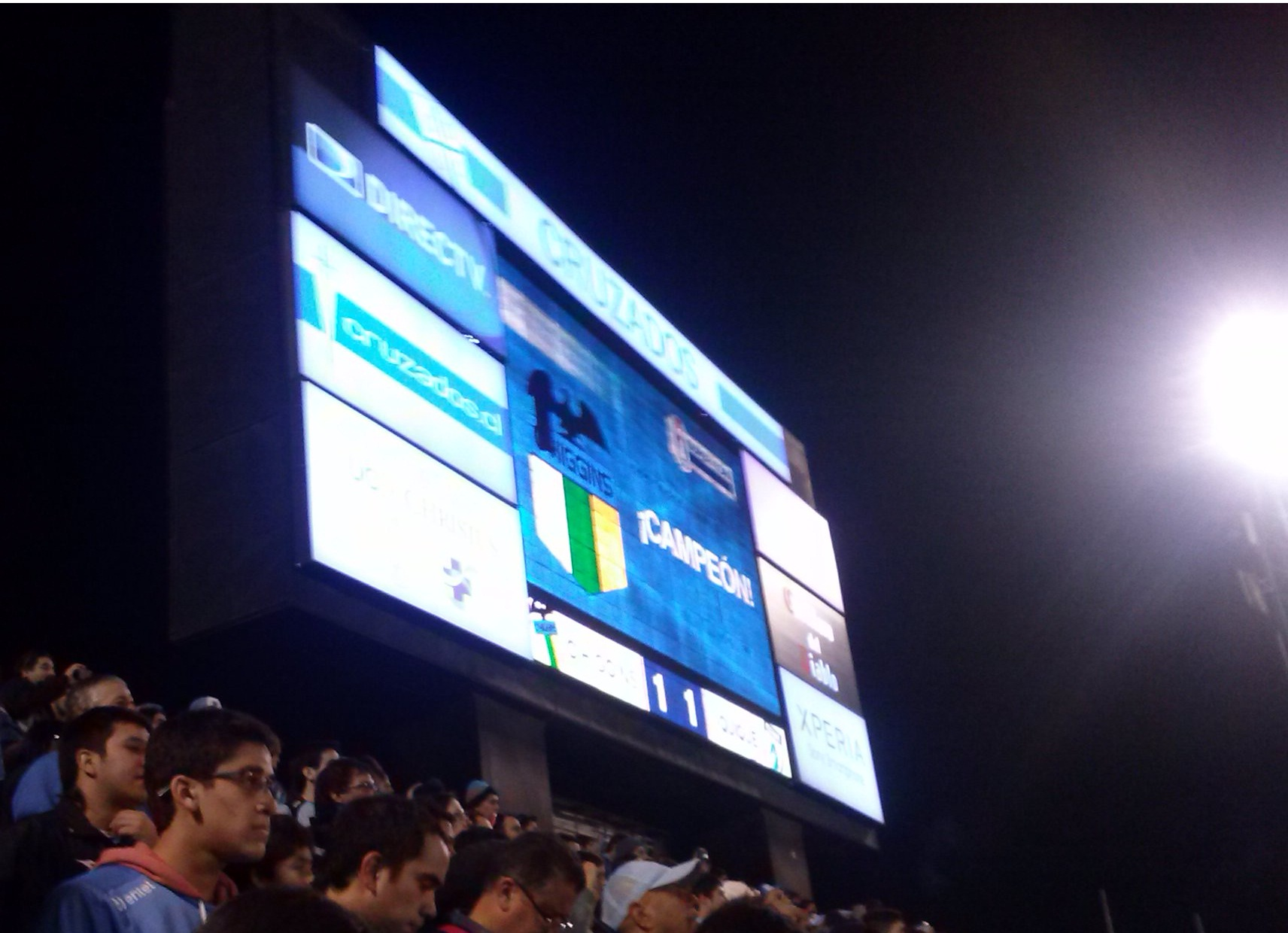
O'Higgins announced as champion on the scoreboard of the stadium.

In the second half, both teams had many chances to score, but they were not taken advantage of, especially O'Higgins, who had two one on one opportunities with goalkeeper Rodrigo Naranjo. The score eventually ended 1–1 after extra time, and the match was decided on penalty kicks.

In the penalty shootout, Opazo, Huerta and Figueroa scored for O'Higgins, Chaves, Vargas and Uglessich missed, meanwhile for Iquique Romero and Villalobos scored, but Zenteno, Pinares, Díaz and Brito failed their penalties, which gave the title to the celestes.

== Road to the final ==
The two teams that disputed the Supercopa were O'Higgins, that qualified as Apertura 2013–14 Champion and the Best Champion in the accumulated table, and Deportes Iquique, that qualified as the winner of the 2013–14 Copa Chile, where it beat Huachipato 3–1 at the Estadio Monumental in the final.

O'Higgins	Deportes Iquique
Apertura 2013–14 Champion and Best-Champion	Winner of the 2013–14 Copa Chile

== Details ==
3 May 2014
16:30

O'Higgins	1–1 (a.e.t.)	Deportes Iquique
Figueroa 38'	Report	Díaz 5'
Penalties
Opazo (penalty scored); Huerta (penalty scored); Chaves (penalty missed); Vargas (penalty missed); Uglessich (penalty missed); Figueroa (penalty scored)	3–2	(penalty missed) Zenteno; (penalty scored) Romero; (penalty missed) Pinares; (penalty missed) Díaz; (penalty scored) Villalobos; (penalty missed) Brito

Estadio San Carlos de Apoquindo, Santiago
Attendance: 7,000
Referee: Roberto Tobar

O'Higgins	Deportes Iquique

GK	1	(Chile) Roberto González (c)
RB	8	(Chile) Yerson Opazo
CB	22	(Argentina) Mariano Uglessich
CB	4	(Chile) Benjamín Vidal
LB	14	(Chile) Nicolás Vargas	(yellow card) 36'
CM	3	(Chile) Albert Acevedo
RCM	2	(Chile) Braulio Leal	(substituted off) 90'
LCM	5	(Chile) César Fuentes
RW	7	(Chile) Luis Pedro Figueroa
LW	13	(Chile) Gonzalo Barriga	(substituted off) 59'
CF	9	(Argentina) Pablo Calandria	(substituted off) 8'
Substitutes:
GK	30	(Chile) Felipe Ochagavía
DF	17	(Chile) Cristhian Venegas
MF	5	(Argentina) Juan Manuel Cobo
MF	28	(Chile) Juan Fuentes
FW	11	(Argentina) Gastón Lezcano	(substituted on) 59'
FW	19	(Uruguay) Diego Cháves	(substituted on) 8'
FW	16	(Chile) Osmán Huerta	(substituted on) 90'
Manager:
(Argentina) Eduardo Berizzo

GK	1	(Chile) Rodrigo Naranjo (c)
RB	18	(Chile) Leandro Delgado	(substituted off) 57'
CB	8	(Chile) Mauricio Zenteno	(yellow card) 79'
CB	24	(Chile) Rodrigo Brito	(yellow card) 13'
LB	4	(Chile) Nicolás Ortiz	(yellow card) 76'	(substituted off) 90'
RCM	5	(Chile) Rafael Caroca
LCM	7	(Uruguay) Santiago Romero
AM	10	(Argentina) Rodrigo Díaz
RW	23	(Argentina) Walter Mazzolatti	(substituted off) 86'
LW	15	(Chile) Gerson Martínez
CF	11	(Chile) Manuel Villalobos
Substitutes:
GK	12	(Chile) Brayan Cortés
DF	3	(Chile) Rubén Taucare	(substituted on) 90'
MF	6	(Chile) Rodrigo Gaete
MF	27	(Chile) Alvaro Delgado
MF	35	(Chile) Felipe Herrera
MF	17	(Chile) César Pinares	(substituted on) 57'
FW	13	(Chile) Jonathan Rebolledo	(substituted on) 86'
Manager:
(Chile) Jaime Vera

Man of the Match:
Rodrigo Naranjo (Iquique)
Assistant referees:
Francisco Mondría
Juan Maturana
Fourth official:
Carlos Ulloa

Match rules

- 90 minutes.
- Penalty shoot-out if scores still level.
- Seven named substitutes.
- Maximum of three substitutions.

Champions

1st title

=== Statistics ===
First half
	OHI	IQU
Goals scored	1	1
Total shots	5	2
Shots on target	4	0
Saves	0	4
Corner kicks	1	2
Fouls committed	3	1
Offsides	1	1
Yellow cards	1	1
Red cards	0	0

Second half
	OHI	IQU
Goals scored	0	0
Total shots	3	3
Shots on target	0	1
Saves	3	1
Corner kicks	6	2
Fouls committed	1	6
Offsides	1	0
Yellow cards	0	2
Red cards	0	0

Overall
	OHI	IQU
Goals scored	1	1
Total shots	8	5
Shots on target	4	1
Saves	3	5
Corner kicks	7	4
Fouls committed	4	7
Offsides	2	1
Yellow cards	1	3
Red cards	0	0
