= Ochagavía (disambiguation) =

Ochagavía a is town and municipality in the province and autonomous community of Navarre, Spain

Ochagavía or Ochagavia may also refer to:

- Ochagavia, a plant genus endemic to Chile
- Ochagavía, a locality in Chile; see Battle of Ochagavía
- Viña Ochagavía, Chilean winery

== People with the surname ==
- Emilio Ochagavía (1922–1996), Spanish couturier, founder of Vargas Ochagavía
- Felipe Ochagavía (born 1993), Chilean footballer
- Fernando Ochagavía (1928–2003), Chilean engineer and politician

== See also ==
- Fernando Rojas Ochagavía (born 1974), Chilean civil engineer and politician
