= Cristhian =

Cristhian (Spanish pronunciation: [ˈkɾistjan]) is a Spanish given name. Notable people with the name include:

- Cristhian Adames (born 1991), Dominican baseball player
- Cristhian Britos (born 1990), Uruguayan footballer
- Cristhian Hernández (born 1993), Mexican footballer
- Cristhian Lagos (born 1984), Costa Rican footballer
- Cristhian Maciel (born 1992), Uruguayan footballer
- Cristhian Martínez (born 1982), former Dominican baseball player
- Cristhian Pacheco (born 1993), Peruvian long distance runner
- Cristhian Paredes (born 1998), Paraguayan footballer
- Cristhian Presichi (born 1980), Mexican baseball player
- Cristhian Stuani (born 1986), Uruguayan footballer
- Cristhian Subero (born 1991), Colombian footballer
- Cristhian Venegas (born 1993), Chilean footballer
