= Patricio Graff =

Argentine footballer and manager

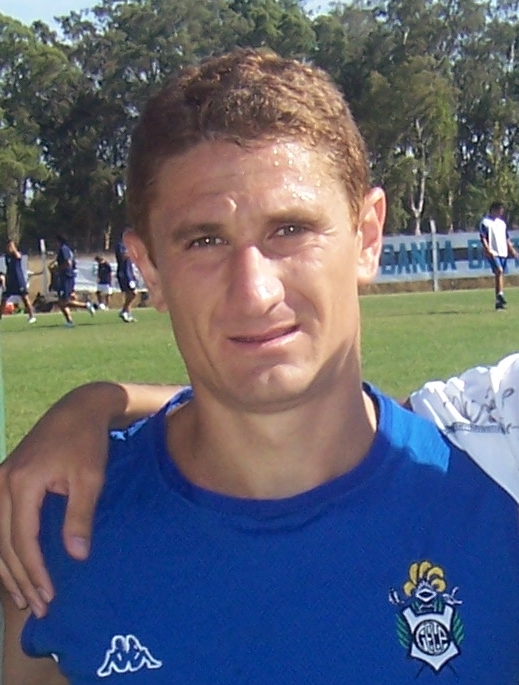
- Graff with Gimnasia in 2009

Personal information
- Full name: Patricio Andrés Graff
- Date of birth: 18 November 1975 (age 50)
- Place of birth: Rosario, Argentina
- Height: 1.74 m (5 ft 8 1/2 in)
- Position: Left back

Team information
- Current team: Audax Italiano (manager)

Senior career*
Years	Team	Apps	(Gls)
1995–1996	Rosario Central	24	(0)
1996–1999	Feyenoord	44	(1)
1999–2000	Den Bosch	10	(0)
2000–2001	Sporting Gijón	35	(0)
2001–2004	Rayo Vallecano	87	(0)
2004–2006	Numancia	54	(1)
2006–2008	Hércules	42	(0)
2008–2010	Gimnasia LP	27	(0)
Total		323	(2)

Managerial career
- 2011–2012: Rosario Central (youth)
- 2013–2014: Universidad Concepción (assistant)
- 2015: O'Higgins (assistant)
- 2017–2019: Coquimbo Unido
- 2020: O'Higgins
- 2021: Palestino
- 2022: Coquimbo Unido
- 2022–2023: Elche B
- 2024: Manchego Ciudad Real
- 2024–2026: Alavés (assistant)
- 2026–: Audax Italiano
- * Club domestic league appearances and goals

Patricio Andrés Graff (Spanish pronunciation: [ɡɾaf]; born 18 November 1975) is an Argentine former footballer who played as a left back. He is currently in charge of Chilean club Audax Italiano.

== Playing career ==
Graff was born in Rosario, Santa Fe. He represented Rosario Central, Feyenoord, FC Den Bosch, Sporting de Gijón, Rayo Vallecano, CD Numancia, Hércules CF and Club de Gimnasia y Esgrima La Plata, in a 15-year senior career.

From 2002 to 2005, while in Spain, Graff experienced two relegations from La Liga (one with Rayo, another with Numancia). In that country, in which he played nearly one decade, he appeared in 235 official matches, 94 of those in the top division; he scored his only goal in the competition on 2 March 2005, as Numancia held hosts Levante UD to a 1–1 draw.

== Coaching career ==
Graff began working as a manager with former club Rosario Central's youth academy. Subsequently, he acted as assistant to his compatriot Pablo Sánchez at C.D. Universidad de Concepción and O'Higgins FC.

Remanining in Chile, Graff then helped Coquimbo Unido promote from the Primera B to the Primera División in 2018. The following season, he led the team to the fifth place with the subsequent qualification for the first stage of the Copa Sudamericana.

In December 2019, even though he had renewed his contract shortly after, Graff signed a two-year deal with O'Higgins and was officially presented late in the month, being received at the Monasterio Celeste by 16 fans (in reference to the Tomé Tragedy) and the board of directors.

In June 2026, Graff returned to Chile and assumed as manager of Audax Italiano.

== Managerial statistics ==
As of match played 8 November 2026

Managerial record by team and tenure
Team	From	To	Record				
Team	From	To	P	W	D	L	Win %
Coquimbo Unido	30 May 2017	9 December 2019	79	34	22	23	43.04
O'Higgins	16 December 2019	9 October 2020	14	3	2	9	21.43
Palestino	19 August 2021	5 December 2021	17	6	6	5	35.29
Coquimbo Unido	6 January 2022	1 August 2022	22	5	5	12	22.73
Elche B	26 December 2022	30 June 2023	15	5	4	6	33.33
Manchego Ciudad Real	27 December 2023	30 November 2024	33	9	14	10	27.27
Audax Italiano	1 July 2026	present	16	4	6	6	25.00
Total			206	66	69	71	32.04
