= Fernando Rojas =

Fernando Rojas may refer to:

- Fernando Rojas (basketball) (1921–2016), Mexican basketball player
- Fernando Rojas Ochagavía (born 1974), Chilean civil engineer and politician
- Fernando Rojas (producer) (born 1968), Colombian-American producer, composer, writer, and pianist
- Fernando de Rojas (c. 1465/73–1541), Spanish author and dramatist
- Fernando J.M. Rojas-Runjaic (born 1979), Venezuelan-Brazilian herpetologist and arachnologist
- Fernando Rojas Vender (1934–2022), Chilean Air Force officer and commander-in-chief
- Fernando Rojas Wolff (1924–1957), Chilean lawyer and politician
