= Nicolás Ortiz =

Nicolás Ortiz may refer to:

- Nicolás Ortiz (footballer, born 1984), Chilean defender for A.C. Barnechea
- Nicolás Ortiz (footballer, born 1995), Argentine defender for Club de Gimnasia y Esgrima La Plata
- Nicolas Ortiz, co-founder of the IKI supermarket chain in Lithuania
