= Tomé tragedy =

2013 bus accident in Tomé, Chile

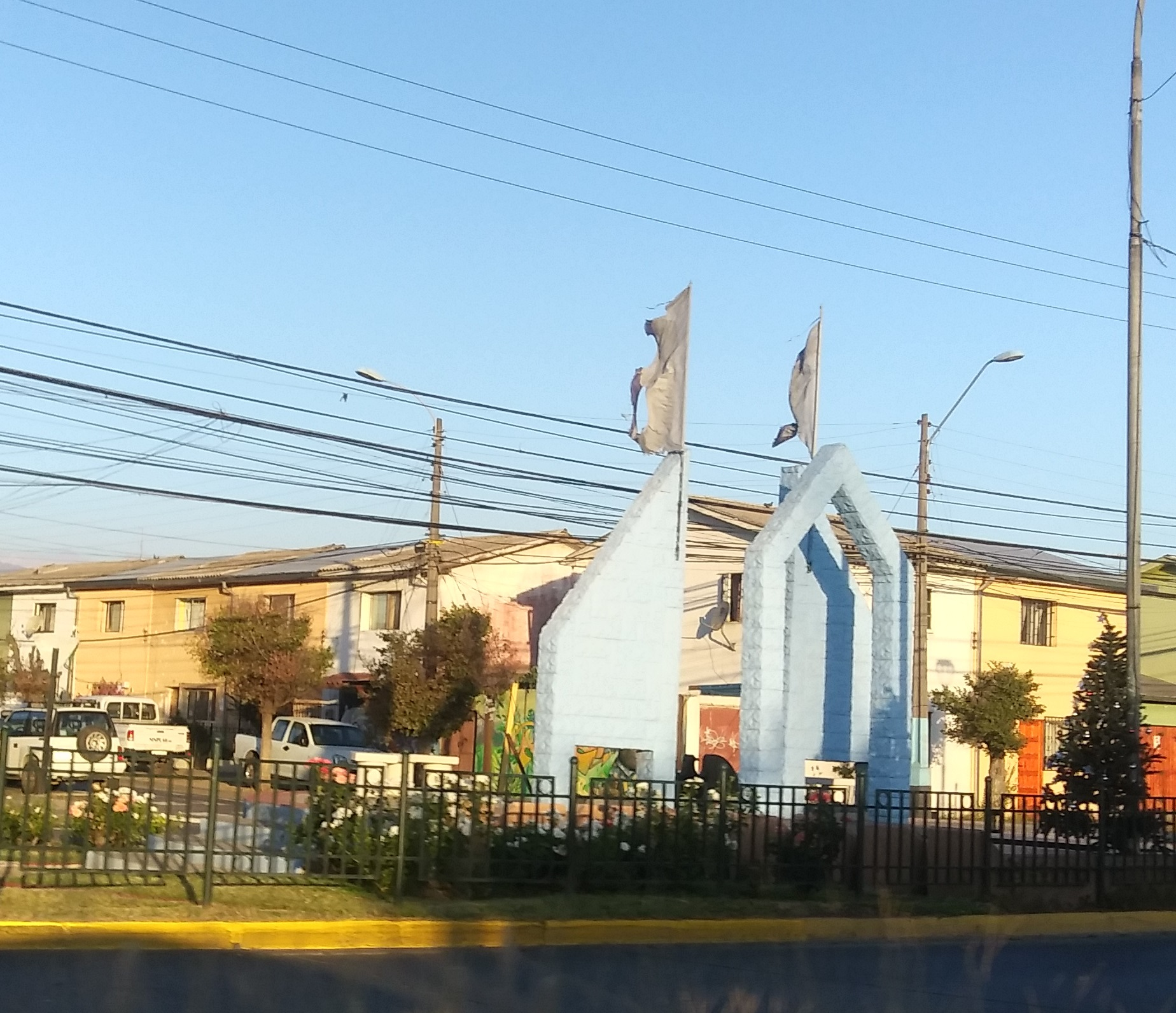
- Los 16 memorial at the outskirts of Estadio El Teniente in Rancagua, Chile
- Date: 9 February 2013
- Time: 01:00 am (approx.)
- Location: Tomé, Chile; 36°38′9.69″S 72°57′21.23″W
- Cause: Excessive speed
- Participants: Trinchera Celeste (O'Higgins supporters' group)
- Deaths: 16
- Injuries: 21

The Tomé Tragedy was the worst fans bus disaster in the history of Chilean football. The tragedy affected the O'Higgins fans after a 2013 Torneo Transición match versus Huachipato in Talcahuano, where in the Cuesta Caracol, the bus fell into a ravine about 100 meters. A bus of the public transport of Rancagua Trans O'Higgins was the vehicle that suffered the accident.

It happened on Saturday February 9, 2013, leaving as a result, 16 deaths and 21 injuries. The disaster affected to the barra brava of the club, Trinchera Celeste.

The event marked the Chilean football, the city of Rancagua and Tomé, so that a date of mourning decreed in the different leagues of the ANFP, and a days in Rancagua and Tomé.

== History ==
O'Higgins played by the 2013 Torneo Transición versus Huachipato in the Estadio CAP, match that ended with victory of Capo 2:0 with goals from Gonzalo Barriga and Juan Rodrigo Rojas.

After the match, a bus of fans was moving towards Dichato but I took in the Cuesta Caracol, the bus off a cliff 100 meters. Once it was known that the bus of fans mourning was declared in the cities of Rancagua and Tomé, as in the local tournament. The remains of the 16 dead were received by the fans in caravans and residents of Rancagua; and the remains were laid to rest in the Estadio El Teniente, where thousands of people attended.

Ten months after the accident, the club inaugurated a memorial located in the Monasterio Celeste, and one year of the event a memorial located near the Estadio El Teniente was inaugurated.

In the new Estadio El Teniente, 16 seats were placed in memory of those killed in the accident, located in Angostura (actualmente galeria 16), where is the Trinchera Celeste.

== The match ==
8 February 2013 Week 3	Huachipato	0 – 2	O'Higgins	Talcahuano, Chile
21:00		Report	Barriga 25'; Rojas 61'	Stadium: Estadio CAP; Attendance: 2,862; Referee: Eduardo Gamboa

== List of deaths ==
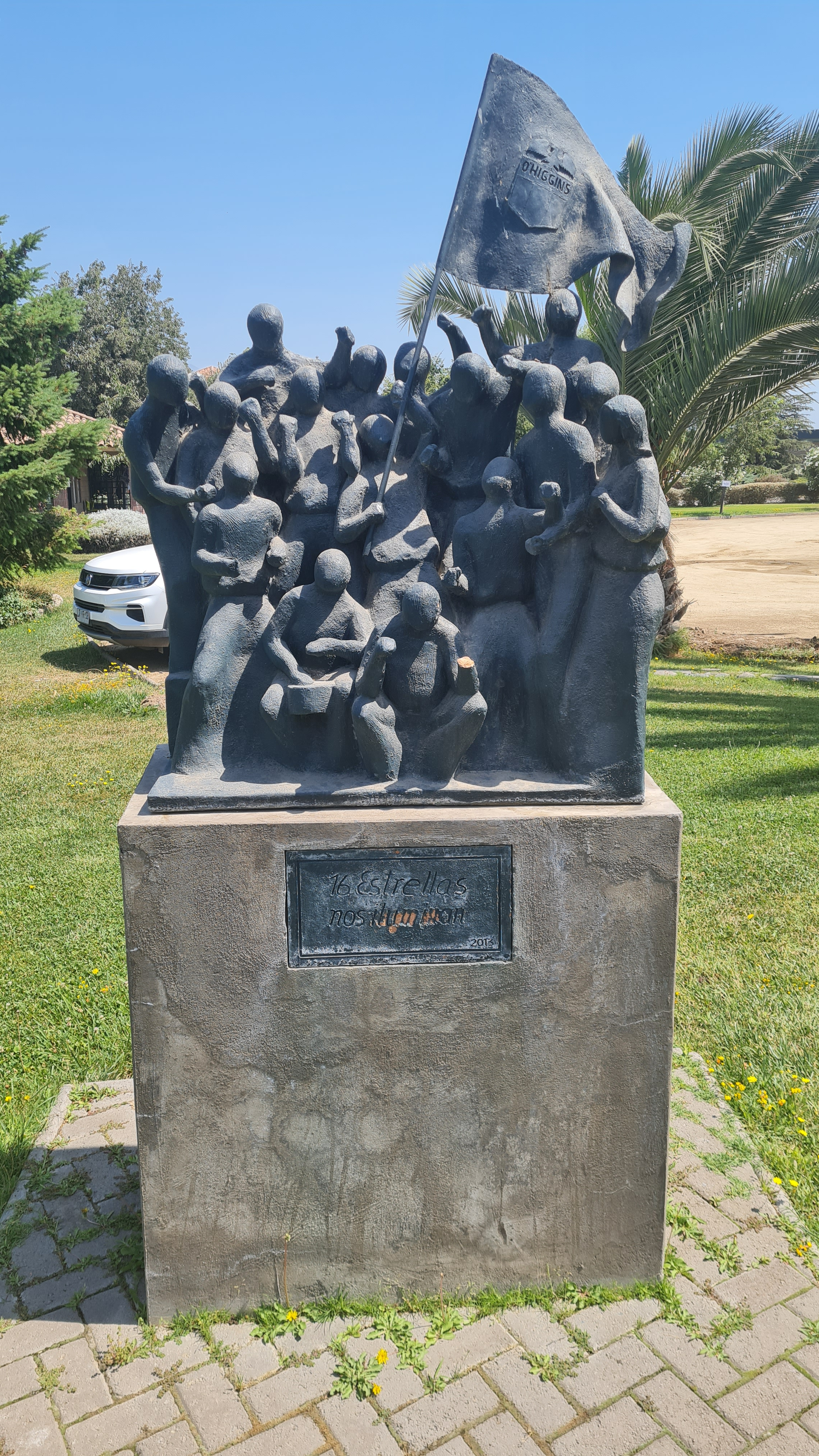
Memorial to the 16 victims of the Tomé tragedy, in Monasterio Celeste

The list of deaths was confirmed on February 10, 2013. Finally, 16 people died in the accident, but known at the time of the accident figures were much higher or lower figure was corrected when the rescue operation had ended knew.

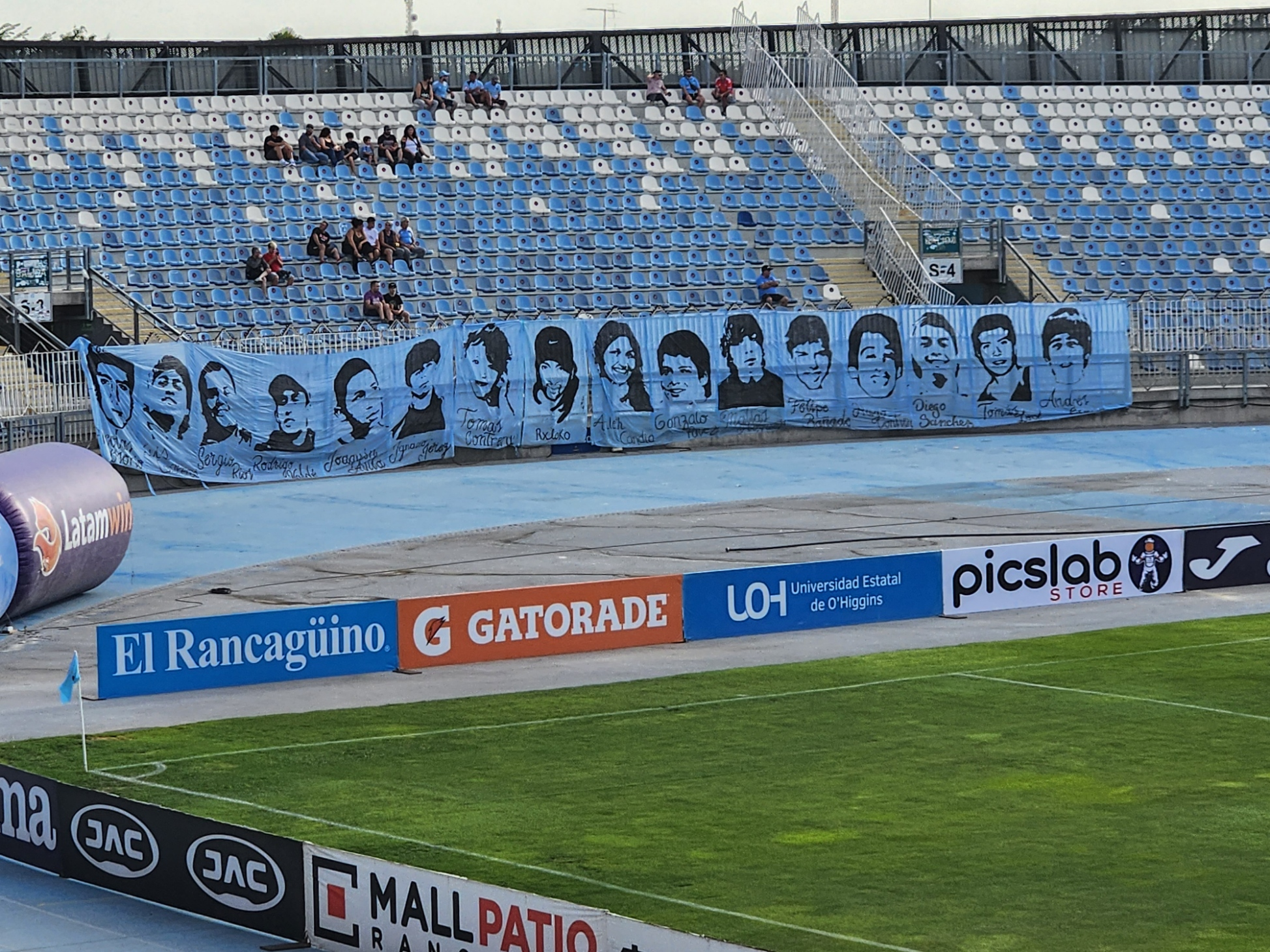
Tribute to the 16 victims of the Tomé tragedy, in Estadio El Teniente.

- Felipe Ignacio Bañado Hernández (17 years)
- Sergio Andrés Ríos Rojas (28 years)
- Tomás Andrés Loch Albornoz (18 years)
- Nicolás Eduardo Osorio Montre (21 years)
- Joaquín Sebastián Ávila Muñoz (16 years)
- Arleth Belén Candia Morales (25 years)
- Matías Alejandro Droguett Carrasco (16 years)
- Rodrigo Felipe Valdés Aliaga (15 years)
- Ignacio Antonio Jerez Rojas (17 years)
- Alex Ramiro Carrasco Hoffmeister (24 years)
- Hugo Bernardo Contreras Becerra (bus driver, 38 years)
- Andrés Nicolás Osorio Cantillana (15 years)
- Diego Esteban Sánchez Faúndez (18 years)
- Luis Alberto Contreras Aedo (15 years)
- Gonzalo Enrique Pavez Osorio (17 years)
- Tomás Benjamín Contreras Román (1 year)

== List of survivors ==
The list of survivors was confirmed on February 10, 2013.

- Andrés Contreras Román
- Aracely Román Garrido
- Byron Castillo Orellana
- Carlos Godoy Escobar
- Cristian Alcayaga
- César Muñoz
- Danilo González Pizarro
- Guillermo Fernández Arévalo
- Jonathan Cornejo Becerra
- Leandro Lira
- Sebastián Ortega Moreno
- Sebastián Troncoso Cortés
- Simón Orellana Castillo
- Paulina Silva Campos
- Ramón Osorio
- Sebastián Osorio
- José González Covarrubias
- Sebastián Cofré Valdivia
- Felipe Ríos Rojas
- Nicolás González Covarrubias
- Nicolás Hidalgo

== Condolences ==
"Mr. Sergio Jadue Jadue:

I want to express my condolences on behalf of South American football, and myself, for the tragedy that mourns the Republic of Chile, as a result, the death of 16 fans of Club O'Higgins de Rancagua, which impelled by love the celeste shirt, cut short his life in an unexpected accident.

Mr. President, I beg to you convey our condolences and solidarity to all families who mourn their loved ones today."

— Nicolás Leoz, CONMEBOL president (2013).

"With great and deep regret I write these lines after knowing the sad news of the death of 16 fans of the club O'Higgins de Rancagua in a bus accident last Saturday. I'm particularly shocked to learn that lost their lives while continuing his passion for after leaving football trip to see his team play away from home.

In the name of FIFA, I want to make extend our deepest condolences for this painful loss, to wish a lot of strength to the families of the victims. The football community supports them in their pain and sincerely hopes that these words comforted them a little to overcome this grief ".

— Joseph Blatter, FIFA president (2013).
