= Subero =

Subero is a surname. Notable people with the surname include:

- Alfonso Subero (born 1970), Spanish footballer
- Carlos Subero (born 1972), Venezuelan baseball coach and player
- Cristhian Subero (born 1991), Colombian footballer
