= Carlos Ross =

Chilean footballer (born 1990)

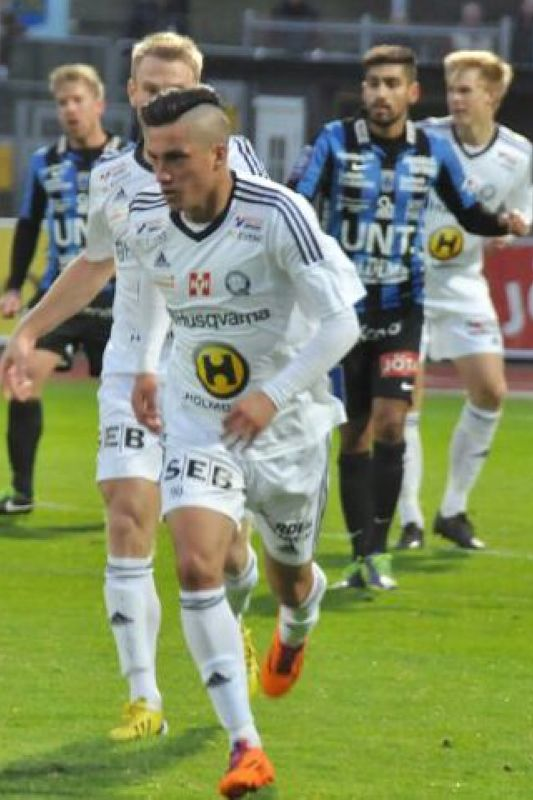
- Ross with Husqvarna FF in 2014

Personal information
- Full name: Carlos Esteban Ross Cotal
- Date of birth: 23 November 1990 (age 35)
- Place of birth: Copiapó, Chile
- Height: 1.77 m (5 ft 10 in)
- Position: Winger

Team information
- Current team: Deportes Copiapó
- Number: 7

Youth career
- 2005–2009: Audax Italiano

Senior career*
Years	Team	Apps	(Gls)
2009–2012	Audax Italiano	35	(3)
2011	→ Coquimbo Unido (loan)	22	(10)
2012	Audax Italiano B	4	(1)
2012	→ O'Higgins (loan)	7	(0)
2013	→ Deportes Copiapó (loan)	12	(1)
2013–2014	→ Unión La Calera (loan)	13	(1)
2014	Husqvarna FF	11	(1)
2014–2015	Deportes Copiapó	33	(5)
2015	Hapoel Nazareth Illit	15	(3)
2016	Gimnasia de Mendoza	11	(1)
2016–2017	Boca Unidos	22	(0)
2017	Platense	6	(0)
2018	Cobresal	14	(3)
2018	Al-Mujazzal	16	(7)
2019–2020	Sport Huancayo	34	(7)
2020–2021	Cobreloa	35	(2)
2022–2024	Sport Huancayo	98	(7)
2025–	Deportes Copiapó	0	(0)

International career^{‡}
2006–2007	Chile U17		
2009	Chile U20	5	(2)
2010	Chile	2	(0)
- * Club domestic league appearances and goals as of 5 January 2024 ‡ National team caps and goals as of 25 September 2015

Carlos Esteban Ross Cotal (born 23 November 1990) is a Chilean footballer who plays as a winger for Deportes Copiapó.

Ross has played in six countries, and three continents (South America, Europe, and Asia). He has also been summoned two times to the (Chile national football team).

== Club career ==
After three seasons with Peruvian club Sport Huancayo, Ross returned to his homeland and joined Deportes Copiapó for the 2025 season.

== International career ==
He has played with the best players in the history of the Chile national team: Alexis Sánchez, Arturo Vidal, Claudio Bravo, Jorge Valdivia, Gary Medel, among others.

The coaches who called Ross to the national team were Marcelo Bielsa and Claudio Borghi. He was part of a Chile under-25 squad in a training session led by Claudio Borghi in May 2011, alongside his teammates in Coquimbo Unido, Nicolás Ortiz and Carlos Escobar.

He has been summoned on five occasions to the Chile national football team, playing two matches.

He made his debut in the national team against Venezuela, entered by José Pedro Fuenzalida, in the city of Temuco, Chile, in that match also played Gary Medel, Eduardo Vargas, Charles Aránguiz, among others.

His second game was against the selection of Northern Ireland, entering by Arturo Vidal. in the city of Chillán, Chile.

Participates in a friendly match which made Chile. In South Africa, against New Zealand.

== Honours ==
Individual

- Copa Bicentenario top assist provider: 2019
- Audax Italiano Best Young Player: 2009* Torneo Apertura 2nd top score: 2011
- Top Score of Coquimbo Unido (12 goals): 2011
- Top assist provider of Coquimbo Unido (6 assists): 2011
- Top assist provider of Deportes Copiapó (5 assists): 2013
- Top assist provider of Deportes Copiapó (5 assists): 2013
- Top Score of Al-Mujazzal Club (7 goals: 2018
- Top assist provider of Sport Huancayo (8 assists): 2019
- Copa Bicentenario team of the year: 2019
- Copa Bicentenario top assist provider: 2019

Audax Italiano

- Chilean Football Youth Leagues: 2009

O'Higgins F.C.

- Chilean Primera División runner-up: 2012

Cobresal

- Campeonato Loto: 2018

Sport Huancayo

- Copa Bicentenario runner-up: 2019
