= Zenteno =

Zenteno is a Spanish surname. Notable people with the surname include:

- Álvaro Casanova Zenteno (1857–1939), Chilean painter
- Edward Zenteno (born 1984), Bolivian footballer
- José Ignacio Zenteno (1786–1847), Chilean soldier and politician
- Mauricio Zenteno (born 1984), Chilean footballer
