= Trinchera Celeste =

Independent supporters group of O'Higgins F.C.

- Nickname: La Trinchera
- Abbreviation: TC
- Established: 2002
- Type: Supporters' group
- Team: O'Higgins
- Motto: La más fiel
- Location: Rancagua, Chile
- Stadium: Estadio El Teniente
- Colors

The Trinchera Celeste is an independent supporters group of O'Higgins, a football club in the Primera División de Chile. It's known as the barra brava of the club.

On February 9, 2013; the barra suffered a bus accident in Tomé. 16 people died, and 21 people were injured.

== History ==
The barra was founded on July 28, 2002, after a match versus Deportes Antofagasta, match that finished 0:0. In the matches played in the Estadio El Teniente, the barra are located in Galería 16 side (formerly known as Angostura side).

=== Tomé Tragedy ===
On February 9, 2013, after the match between the club and Huachipato, a group of fans traveled in a bus to Tomé, where in the Cuesta Caracol fell into a ravine, causing the death of sixteen fans. The event marked the Chilean football, the city of Rancagua and Tomé, so that a date of mourning decreed in the different leagues of the ANFP, and a days in Rancagua and Tomé.

== Music ==
In musical terms, it brings together popular chants, anthems and songs of the fans that have been collected and distributed on digital platforms. They have albums and EP's dedicated to the club, such as the classic album Cánticos (2002), Rap Cele (2023), Recuerdos Celestes (2023) and more recent singles such as Imposible or Aquí No Se Falla (2025).
