= Juan Luis González =

Chilean footballer (born 1974)

Personal information
- Full name: Juan Luis González Calderón
- Date of birth: June 16, 1974 (age 52)
- Place of birth: Limache, Chile
- Height: 1.78 m (5 ft 10 in)
- Position: Defender

Youth career
- 1984–1989: Villa Independencia
- 1993: Deportes La Serena

Senior career*
Years	Team	Apps	(Gls)
1994–1999	Deportes La Serena	115	(5)
2000	Everton	26	(2)
2001–2002	Coquimbo Unido	50	(6)
2003–2007	Cobreloa	142	(11)
2008	Everton	31	(1)
2009	Deportes La Serena	32	(1)
2010–2011	O'Higgins	50	(1)
2012–2014	Deportes Antofagasta	49	(1)

International career
1998	Chile B	1	(0)
2004–2005	Chile	5	(0)

Managerial career
- 2019–: Deportes La Serena (youth)
- * Club domestic league appearances and goals

Juan Luis González Calderón (born 16 Jun 1974) is a former Chilean footballer.

== Club career ==
Born in Limache, Chile, González was with local club Villa Independencia until the age of 15. Few years later, he moved to La Serena and joined the local club, Deportes La Serena in 1993.

== International career ==
González played for Chile B against England B on February 10, 1998. Chile won by 2-1. Later, he made five appearances for Chile from 2004 to 2005.

== Managerial career ==
In 2021, he graduated as a Football Manager at the INAF (Football National Institute). He has worked for the Deportes La Serena youth system and won the 2019 ANFP Youth Championship with the under-16's.

== Personal life ==
He is nicknamed Limache due to his city of birth.

== Honours ==
=== Player ===
Deportes La Serena

- Primera B de Chile (1): 1996

Cobreloa

- Primera División de Chile (3): 2003 Apertura, 2003 Clausura, 2004 Clausura

Everton

- Primera División de Chile (1): 2008 Apertura

=== Manager ===
Deportes La Serena U16

- ANFP Youth Championship (1): 2019
