= Nicolás Vargas =

Chilean footballer (born 1993)

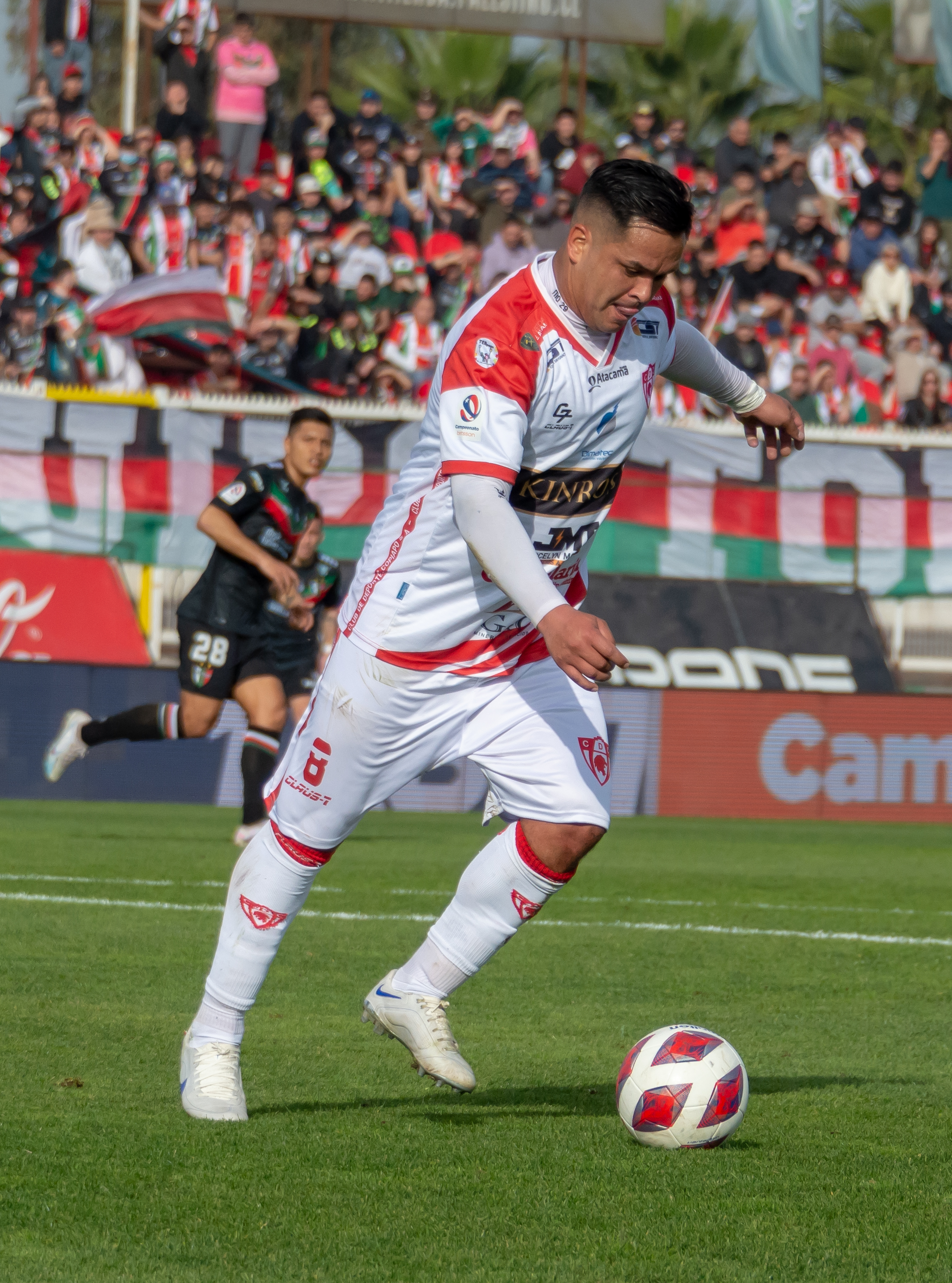
- Vargas with Deportes Copiapó in 2023

Personal information
- Full name: Pablo Nicolás Vargas Romero
- Date of birth: 15 September 1993 (age 33)
- Place of birth: Rengo, Chile
- Height: 1.75 m (5 ft 9 in)
- Position: Defender

Team information
- Current team: Huachipato

Youth career
- 2007–2011: O'Higgins

Senior career*
Years	Team	Apps	(Gls)
2011–2017	O'Higgins	83	(1)
2013	→ Barnechea (loan)	1	(0)
2016	→ Audax Italiano (loan)	6	(0)
2017	Coquimbo Unido	5	(0)
2018–2023	Ñublense	117	(13)
2023–2024	Deportes Copiapó	30	(3)
2025–	Huachipato	0	(0)
- * Club domestic league appearances and goals as of 7 March 2025

Pablo Nicolás Vargas Romero (Spanish pronunciation: [nikoˈlas ˈβaɾɣas]; born 15 September 1993), known as Nicolás Vargas, is a Chilean professional footballer who plays as a defender for Chilean Primera División club Huachipato.

== Career ==
=== Youth career ===
Vargas started his career at Primera División de Chile club O'Higgins. He progressed from the under categories club all the way to the senior team.

=== O'Higgins ===
Vargas was part of the youth teams of O'Higgins before to be promoted to the first team in 2012 by Eduardo Berizzo. On 2013 is sent on loan to Barnechea, come back for the Apertura 2013-14.

On December 10, 2013, he won the Apertura 2013-14 with O'Higgins and was the captain of team. In the tournament, he played in 11 of 18 matches.

In 2014, he won the Supercopa de Chile against Deportes Iquique, playing the 90 minutes of the match, and failing a penalty in the penalty shoot-out.

He participated with the club in the 2014 Copa Libertadores where they faced Deportivo Cali, Cerro Porteño and Lanús, being third and being eliminated in the group stage.

=== Deportes Copiapó ===
In June 2023, he joined Deportes Copiapó. On 9 October 2024, he and his teammate Leonardo Pais were fired before the 2024 season ended.

=== Huachipato ===
On 6 March 2025, Vargas joined Huachipato.

== Honours ==
O'Higgins

- Chilean Primera División: 2013 Apertura
- Supercopa de Chile: 2014

Ñublense

- Primera B de Chile: 2020

Huachipato

- Copa Chile: 2025

Individual

- Medalla Santa Cruz de Triana: 2014
