= SuperCupNI =

Football tournament in Northern Ireland

- SuperCupNI Logo
- Founded: 1995 (Elite); 1983 (Premier); 1985 (Junior)
- Region: Northern Ireland
- Teams: 6 (Elite); 24 (Premier); 24 (Junior)
- Broadcaster: BBC Northern Ireland
- Website: supercupni.com

SuperCupNI, formerly called the Northern Ireland Youth Soccer Tournament and the Dale Farm Milk Cup, is an international youth football tournament held annually in Northern Ireland. The cup matches are mainly played in the North Coast area of Northern Ireland, with matches taking place in the towns of Portrush, Portstewart, Castlerock, Limavady, Coleraine, Ballymoney, Ballymena and Broughshane. Mitre are the Official Ball Sponsor of the SuperCup with a specially designed Pro Max ball being used.

== History ==
Logo used when the tournament was known as the Dale Farm Milk Cup

The Northern Ireland Youth Soccer Tournament began in 1983 with sixteen teams participating at an Under 16 (Premier) level. Motherwell from Scotland were the first winners. It was founded by Jim Weir, Victor Leonard, George Logan and Bertie Peacock, one of the most famous football players from the region.

The competition was extended in 1985 when an extra age group, the Under 14 (Junior) section was introduced and again the first champions were from Scotland, as Rangers won the Northern Ireland Youth Soccer Tournament at that age level. The competition at both levels has grown in size and stature over the years, with teams increasingly travelling from all continents to compete. The Under 19 (Elite) section was introduced in 1995 with the Welsh finishing the tournament as winners. Traditionally, the finals are played at the Coleraine Showgrounds on the Friday evening.

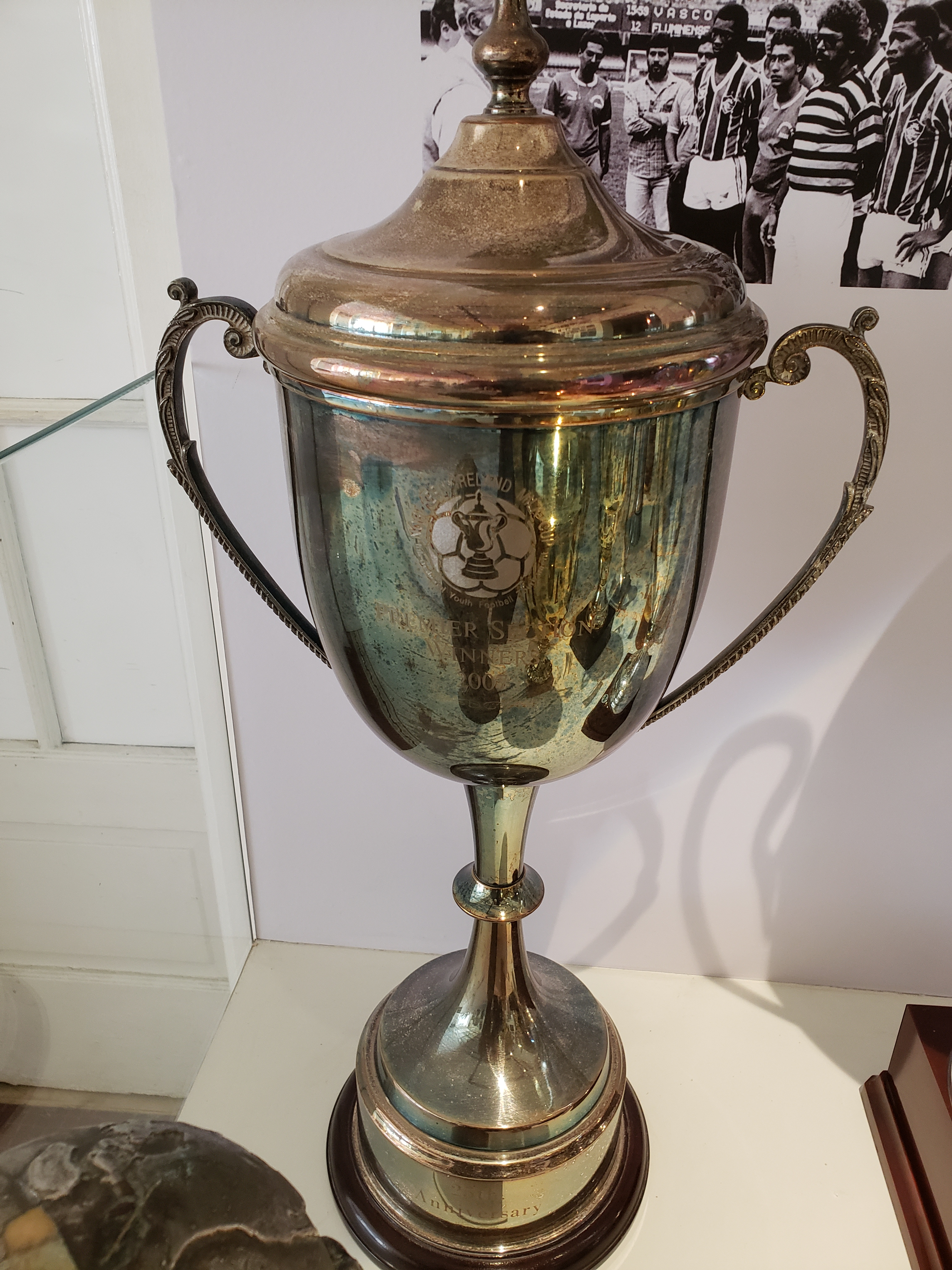
Milk Cup Sub-16 2007.

Internationally capped footballers have taken part in the Northern Ireland Youth Soccer Tournament, such as Charlie Davies, Jonathan Spector, Paul Scholes, and Wayne Rooney have all competed at some level. In the 2002 FIFA World Cup there were 30 Northern Ireland Youth Soccer Tournament veterans playing.

To celebrate the competition's silver jubilee, a friendly match took place between Northern Ireland and four-time junior section winners Everton at the Coleraine Showgrounds on 14 July 2007. Everton won the tie 2–0.

One of the key parts to the Northern Ireland Youth Soccer Tournament is the inclusion of six representative teams from each county of Northern Ireland – Antrim, Armagh, Londonderry, Down, Fermanagh and Tyrone. This system allows young players from across the province to compete against some of the best in the world at their age group.

In October 2013, the Northern Ireland Youth Soccer Tournament organising committee and lead sponsors Dairy Council released a joint statement stating that the long-term sponsors Dairy Council would be withdrawing sponsorship.

In February 2014, the organisers announced that competition would be sponsored by Belfast-based company Dale Farm and that the competition would be known as the Dale Farm Milk Cup for sponsorship reasons. From 2016 it has been known as the Super Cup NI.

== Winners ==
Year	Elite (U-19)		Premier (U-16)		Junior (U-14)	
Year	Winner	Runner-up	Winner	Runner-up	Winner	Runner-up
1983	Founded in 1995		(Scotland) Motherwell	(Northern Ireland) Coleraine	Founded in 1985	
1984	Founded in 1995		(Scotland) Rangers	(Scotland) Motherwell	Founded in 1985	
1985	Founded in 1995		(England) Newcastle United	(Northern Ireland) Coleraine	(Scotland) Rangers	(Northern Ireland) Craigavon
1986	Founded in 1995		(Scotland) Dundee United	(England) Newcastle United	(Northern Ireland) Craigavon United	(England) Crewe Alexandra
1987	Founded in 1995		(England) Crewe Alexandra	(England) Liverpool	(Scotland) Dundee United	(England) Crewe Alexandra
1988	Founded in 1995		(England) Liverpool	(Scotland) Motherwell	(Republic of Ireland) Home Farm	(Scotland) Dundee United
1989	Founded in 1995		(England) Newcastle United	(England) Manchester United	(Northern Ireland) Dungannon Swifts	(Republic of Ireland) Dublin & District Schoolboys
1990	Founded in 1995		(England) Tottenham Hotspur	(England) Crewe Alexandra	(England) Crewe Alexandra	(Scotland) Hibernian
1991	Founded in 1995		(England) Manchester United	(Scotland) Heart of Midlothian	(England) Norwich City	(Scotland) Dundee United
1992	Founded in 1995		(Scotland) Rangers	(England) Nottingham Forest	(England) Norwich City	(Scotland) Heart of Midlothian
1993	Founded in 1995		(Republic of Ireland) Cherry Orchard	(Scotland) Rangers	Slovakia	(Scotland) Heart of Midlothian
1994	Founded in 1995		(Scotland) Hearts	Russia	(England) Middlesbrough	(England) Manchester United
1995	Wales		Russia	(Netherlands) Feyenoord	(England) Everton	(England) Norwich City
1996	Turkey		(England) Tottenham Hotspur	(England) Blackburn Rovers	(England) West Ham United	(Scotland) Motherwell
1997	Northern Ireland		(England) Middlesbrough	(England) Manchester United	(England) West Ham United	(England) Middlesbrough
1998	Turkey		Chile	(England) West Ham United	(England) Crewe Alexandra	(England) West Ham United
1999	(Brazil) Vitória		(England) Crewe Alexandra	(England) Manchester United	(England) Manchester City	(England) Everton
2000	Chile		Turkey	(England) Manchester City	(England) Charlton Athletic	(England) Manchester City
2001	Mexico	Scotland	Paraguay	(England) Manchester United	(England) Norwich City	(Scotland) Heart of Midlothian
2002	Paraguay	Denmark	(England) Leeds United	(Greece) Panathinaikos	(England) Everton	(Brazil) Botafogo
2003	Paraguay	Brazil	(England) Manchester United	(England) Preston North End	(Argentina) Racing Club	(Scotland) Heart of Midlothian
2004	Turkey	Brazil	(Scotland) Heart of Midlothian	(Republic of Ireland) Belvedere	(Israel) Maccabi Haifa	(England) Everton
2005	(United States) USA	Northern Ireland	(Spain) Barcelona	(England) Chelsea	(Denmark) Lyngby	(Russia) CSKA Moscow
2006	Paraguay	(United States) USA	(Russia) Spartak Moscow	(Austria) Rapid Vienna	(England) Swindon Town	(Republic of Ireland) Crumlin United
2007	Israel	Northern Ireland	(Brazil) Fluminense	(England) Manchester United	(Mexico) Guadalajara	(Republic of Ireland) St. Kevin's Boys FC
2008	Northern Ireland	Chile	(England) Manchester United	(United States) South Coast Bayern	(England) Everton	(England) Wolverhampton Wanderers
2009	Northern Ireland	Denmark	(England) Manchester United	(England) Sheffield United	(England) Everton	(England) Watford
2010	(United States) USA	Northern Ireland	(Senegal) Étoile Lusitana	(England) Bolton Wanderers	(England) Chelsea	(Mexico) Cruz Azul
2011	Denmark	Northern Ireland	(Qatar) Aspire	(England) Manchester United	(England) Everton	(Mexico) Cruz Azul
2012	Mexico	Denmark	(Brazil) Desportivo Brasil	(England) Newcastle United	(England) Brentford	(England) Everton
2013	Mexico	Northern Ireland	(England) Manchester United	(Northern Ireland) County Tyrone	(England) Everton	(Northern Ireland) County Antrim
2014	Northern Ireland	Canada	(England) Manchester United	(France) Vendée	(Brazil) Corinthians	(Northern Ireland) County Antrim
2015	not held		(Northern Ireland) County Antrim	(Mexico) Club América	(Ghana) Right to Dream	(England) Southampton
2016	(England) Everton	(Scotland) Celtic	(Chile) O'Higgins	(Scotland) Hibernian	(Ghana) Right to Dream	(Northern Ireland) County Londonderry
2017	(England) Manchester United	Northern Ireland	(Ghana) Right to Dream	(Mexico) Club América	(Northern Ireland) County Antrim	(United States) GPS Bayern
2018	not held		(Italy) B Italia	(Northern Ireland) County Down	(Northern Ireland) County Antrim	(England) Manchester United
2019	not held		(Spain) Valencia	(England) Newcastle United	(Scotland) Rangers FC	(England) Charlton Athletic

The competition wasn't played in 2020 or 2021 due to the COVID-19 pandemic. In 2021, Manchester United's under-16s played 3 challenge matches against Coleraine, Ballymena United and Linfield.

Year	Premier		Junior		Youth (U-14)		Minor (U-13)	
Year	Winner	Runner-up	Winner	Runner-up	Winner	Runner-up	Winner	Runner-up
2022	(England) Ipswich Town	(Northern Ireland) County Antrim	(England) Manchester United	(Scotland) Rangers	(England) Charlton Athletic	(Northern Ireland) Glenavon	(United States) Surf Select	(Northern Ireland) Glentoran
2023	(Northern Ireland) County Londonderry	(Mexico) Tigres UANL	(England) West Ham United	(Northern Ireland) County Antrim	not held		(Scotland) Celtic	(Northern Ireland) Dungannon United Youth
2024	(England) Brighton & Hove Albion	(Northern Ireland) County Armagh	(England) West Ham United	(Northern Ireland) County Down	not held		(Northern Ireland) Crusaders	(Northern Ireland) Linfield
2025	(England) Southampton FC	(England) Manchester United	(Northern Ireland) County Antrim	(Northern Ireland) County Armagh	not held		(Northern Ireland) Crusaders	(Northern Ireland) Linfield

== Notable players ==
- Danny Murphy (Crewe Alexandra) 1993
- Juan Agudelo (United States)
- Jozy Altidore (United States)
- Dean Ashton (Crewe Alexandra) 1997 (U14), 2000 (U19)
- Nicky Barmby (Tottenham Hotspur)
- Joey Barton (Everton) 1997 (U14)
- Craig Bellamy (Norwich City)
- Kris Boyd (Kilmarnock)
- Wes Brown (Manchester United) 1994 (U14), 1996 (U16)
- Sergio Busquets (Barcelona)
- Nicky Butt (Manchester United) 1991
- Michael Carrick (West Ham United) 1995 (U14)
- Michael Chopra (Newcastle United) 1997, 1998 (U14), 1999 (U16)
- Joe Cole (West Ham) 1995, 1996 (U14), 1998 (U16)
- Stephen Craigan (County Down) 2001 (U16), (Northern Ireland) 2003 (U19)
- Peter Crouch (Tottenham Hotspur) 1997 (U16)
- Jermain Defoe (Charlton Athletic) 1997 (U14)
- Damien Duff (Blackburn Rovers) 1994, 1995 (U16)
- Calum Elliot (Heart of Midlothian) 2002 (U14), 2004 (U16)
- Jonny Evans (County Antrim) 2002 (U14), (Manchester United) 2004 (U16)
- Shane Ferguson (Northern Ireland)
- Mikael Forssell (HJK Helsinki) 1997 (U16)
- Darron Gibson (County Londonderry) 2002 (U14), (Manchester United) 2004 (U16)
- Ryan Giggs (Manchester United) 1991
- Keith Gillespie (Manchester United) 1991
- Owen Hargreaves (Bayern Munich 1997 (U16), (Wales) 1998 (U19)
- Angelo Henriquez (Chile)
- Humberto Suazo (Chile) 2000 (Elite)
- Tony Hibbert (Everton) 1995 (U14)
- Sean Sullivan (Malta National Team)
- Thomas Hitzlsperger (Bayern Munich)
- Aaron Hughes (Northern Ireland) 1996, 1997 (U19)
- Mats Hummels (Bayern Munich)
- Phil Jagielka (Everton) 1997 (U14)
- Francis Jeffers (Everton) 1995 (U14)
- Jeffren (Barcelona)
- Ledley King (Tottenham Hotspur) 1996, 1997 (U16)
- Kyle Lafferty (County Fermanagh) 2001, 2002, (U14), (Northern Ireland) 2003 (U16)
- Federico Macheda (Manchester United)
- Steve McManaman (Liverpool) 1988
- Stephen McManus (Everton) 1997 (U14)
- James Milner (Leeds United) 2001, 2002, 2003 (U16)
- Juan Azuara (México) (2001)
- Ryo Miyaichi (Japan)
- Gary Neville (Manchester United)
- Leon Osman (Everton) 1995 (U14)
- Danny Pugh (Manchester United) 1997 (U14), 1999 (U16)
- Diego Reyes (Mexico)
- Kieran Richardson (West Ham United), 1997, 1998, 1999, (U14), (Manchester United) 2000, 2001 (U16)
- Wayne Rooney (Everton)
- Robbie Savage (Manchester United)
- Paul Scholes (Manchester United) 1991
- Jonathan Spector (Manchester United, United States)
- Michael Tonge (Manchester United)
- Michael Turner (Charlton Athletic)
- James Vaughan (Everton)
- Danny Welbeck (Manchester United)
- Steven Davis (Northern Ireland) 2003, 2004 (U19)
- Andy Little (County Fermanagh), 2003, 2004 (U14), (Northern Ireland) 2007 (U19)
- Dean Shiels (West Ham United), 2000 (U14), (Northern Ireland) 2003 (U19)
- Andy Kirk(Northern Ireland) 1996, 1997 (U19)
- David Healy (Northern Ireland) 1996, 1997 (U19)
- Chris Brunt (Northern Ireland) 2003 (U19)
- Cammy Bell (Kilmarnock) 2002, 2003 (U16)
- Sone Aluko (Birmingham City) 2003 (U14)
- Shaun Maloney (Scotland) 2001, 2002 (U19)
- Steven Naismith (Kilmarnock) 2002 (U16)
- Lee Wallace (Heart of Midlothian) 2002 (U14)
- Alan Mannus (Northern Ireland) 1998 (U16), 2000, 2001 (U19)
- Chris Baird (Northern Ireland) 2000, 2001 (U19)
- Allan McGregor (Scotland) 2001 (U19)
- Warren Feeney (Northern Ireland) 1997 (U16), 1998, 1999 (U19)
- Ivan Sproule (County Tyrone) 1997 (U16)
- Roy Carroll (Northern Ireland) 1995 (U19)
- Charlie Miller (Rangers) 1992 (U16)
- Barry Ferguson (Rangers) 1992 (U14)
- Paddy McCourt (County Londonderry) 2000 (U16), (Northern Ireland) 2002 (U19)
- Anton Ferdinand (West Ham United) 1998, 1999, 2000 (U14)
- Marcus Rashford (Manchester United) 2014 (U19)
- Luke Fleming (County Londonderry ) 2025 (U16)

== Media coverage ==
Since 2005 the Northern Ireland Youth Soccer Tournament has been broadcast on BBC Northern Ireland, taking over from UTV. This has led to much more media coverage as matches from Finals Night are broadcast on BBC Two Northern Ireland. Usually these are from the Premier and Elite section featuring highlights of the junior game which happens earlier in the afternoon. Some Northern Ireland Youth Soccer Tournament matches are broadcast on BBC Two NI, made available to the rest of the UK via BBCi and the BBC Sport website and some other Milk Cup matches are broadcast online. The coverage is usually hosted by Stephen Watson, with commentary by BBC commentators such as Jackie Fullerton, Michael McNamee, Paul Gilmour, Joel Taggart, Grant Cameron and punditry by John O'Neill, Gerry Armstrong and Oran Kearney.

== See also ==
- List of football (soccer) competitions
