= Jonathan Rebolledo =

Chilean footballer (born 1991)

Personal information
- Full name: Jonathan Eduardo Rebolledo Ardiles
- Date of birth: 22 October 1991 (age 35)
- Place of birth: Iquique, Chile
- Height: 1.70 m (5 ft 7 in)
- Position: Midfielder

Youth career
- 2006–2009: Deportes Iquique

Senior career*
Years	Team	Apps	(Gls)
2009–2018	Deportes Iquique	85	(6)
2019	Puerto Montt	7	(0)
- * Club domestic league appearances and goals as of 29 March 2020

Jonathan Eduardo Rebolledo Ardiles (Spanish pronunciation: [xoˈnatan reβoˈʎeðo], born 22 October 1991) is a Chilean footballer.

== Honours ==
=== Club ===
Deportes Iquique

- Copa Chile (2): Runner–up 2009, 2010
- Primera B: 2010
