= Carlos Escobar (footballer, born 1989) =

Chilean footballer

Personal information
- Full name: Carlos Humberto Escobar Ortiz
- Date of birth: 24 December 1989 (age 36)
- Place of birth: Coquimbo, Chile
- Height: 1.85 m (6 ft 1 in)
- Position: Forward

Team information
- Current team: Deportes Concepción
- Number: 9

Youth career
- 2001–2005: Coquimbo Unido

Senior career*
Years	Team	Apps	(Gls)
2006–2011	Coquimbo Unido	58	(16)
2007	→ Deportes Temuco (loan)	13	(2)
2012–2015	O'Higgins	40	(6)
2014–2015	→ Cobresal (loan)	30	(2)
2015–2017	San Luis	54	(19)
2017–2018	Universidad de Concepción	11	(0)
2018	→ San Luis (loan)	17	(1)
2019	Cobresal	13	(1)
2020–2022	Deportes Temuco	84	(21)
2023	Sport Huancayo	28	(4)
2024–	Deportes Concepción	0	(0)
- * Club domestic league appearances and goals as of 30 January 2024

Carlos Humberto Escobar Ortiz (born 24 December 1989; Spanish pronunciation: [ˈkaɾlos eskoˈβaɾ]), is a Chilean professional footballer who plays as a forward for Deportes Concepción.

== Club career ==
Escobar in 2012 signed for O'Higgins from Coquimbo Unido. On 10 December 2013, he won the Apertura 2013–14 with O'Higgins. In the tournament, he played in 9 of 18 matches.

In 2014, he won the Supercopa de Chile against Deportes Iquique.

He participated with the club in the 2014 Copa Libertadores where they faced Deportivo Cali, Cerro Porteño and Lanús, being third and being eliminated in the group stage.

He signed with Sport Huancayo for the 2023 season.

In 2024, he returned to Chile and joined Deportes Concepción in the Segunda División Profesional.

== International career ==
He was part of a Chile under-25 squad in a training session led by Claudio Borghi in May 2011, alongside his teammates in Coquimbo Unido, Nicolás Ortiz and Carlos Ross.

== Personal life ==
He is the cousin of the brothers Luciano and Darwin Araya Escobar, both footballers from the Coquimbo Unido youth system.

== Honours ==
O'Higgins

- Chilean Primera División: 2013 Apertura
- Supercopa de Chile: 2014

Cobresal

- Chilean Primera División: 2015 Clausura

Individual

- Medalla Santa Cruz de Triana: 2014
