= 2013 Northern Ireland Youth Soccer Tournament =

Tournament details
- Host country: Northern Ireland
- Dates: 29 July – 2 August

The 2013 Northern Ireland Milk Cup was the thirty-first edition of the international football tournament which takes place annually in the north coast of Northern Ireland, and attracts competitors from across the globe. There are three sections to the tournament, the Elite Section (U19), the Premier Section (U17) and the Junior Section (U15). The 2013 U-19 edition was won by Mexico.
