= Rodrigo Naranjo =

Chilean footballer (born 1979)

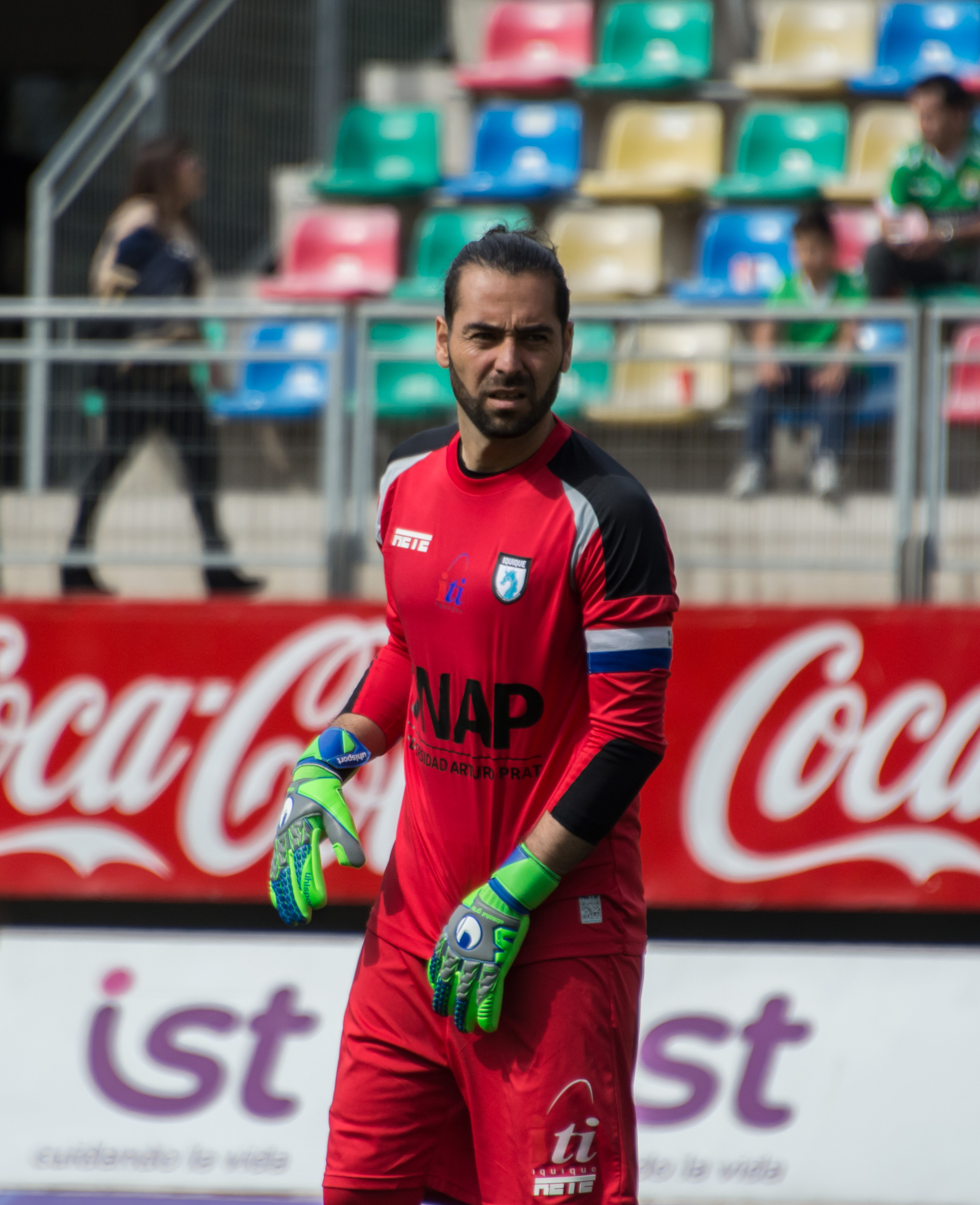
- Naranjo with Deportes Iquique in 2018

Personal information
- Full name: Rodrigo David Naranjo López
- Date of birth: 30 August 1979 (age 47)
- Place of birth: Santiago, Chile
- Height: 1.92 m (6 ft 4 in)
- Position: Goalkeeper

Youth career
- CAJU
- Santiago Wanderers

Senior career*
Years	Team	Apps	(Gls)
1999	Santiago Wanderers B	–	(–)
2000–2005	Santiago Wanderers	21	(0)
2004	→ Unión La Calera (loan)	0	(0)
2006	Everton	1	(0)
2007	Coquimbo Unido	7	(0)
2008–2010	Municipal Iquique	91	(0)
2011–2019	Deportes Iquique	201	(0)
Total		321	(0)

Managerial career
- 2021: Santiago Wanderers (youth)
- 2021–2024: Santiago Wanderers (gk coach)
- 2025–: Deportes Iquique (gk coach)
- * Club domestic league appearances and goals

Rodrigo David Naranjo López (born 30 August 1979) is a Chilean retired footballer who played as goalkeeper.

== Coaching career ==
In 2025, Naranjo assumed as goalkeeping coach for Deportes Iquique.

== Honours ==
Santiago Wanderers

- Primera División de Chile (1): 2001

Deportes Iquique

- Primera B (1): 2010
- Copa Chile (2): 2010, 2012–13
