= Osmán Huerta =

Chilean footballer (born 1989)

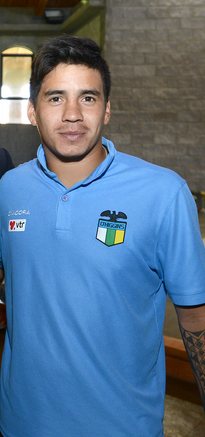
- Huerta in 2013

Personal information
- Full name: Osmán Alexis Huerta Cabezas
- Date of birth: 16 June 1989 (age 37)
- Place of birth: Antofagasta, Chile
- Height: 1.66 m (5 ft 5 in)
- Position: Striker

Senior career*
Years	Team	Apps	(Gls)
2007–2011	Deportes Antofagasta	101	(17)
2012	Curicó Unido	17	(4)
2013–2014	→ O'Higgins (loan)	28	(2)
2014–2016	Deportes Antofagasta	9	(0)
2015	→ Curicó Unido (loan)	9	(0)
2015–2016	→ Ñublense (loan)	24	(2)
2018	Coquimbo Unido	3	(1)
- * Club domestic league appearances and goals as of 6 August 2018

Osmán Huerta (born June 16, 1989) is a Chilean footballer as a striker.

== Career ==
He played at Deportes Antofagasta between 2007 and 2011, where he won the Primera B Apertura 2011.

In 2013, Huerta played for Curicó Unido, playing 17 matches and scoring 4 goals for the Primera B.

=== O'Higgins ===
Huerta in 2013 signed for O'Higgins from Curicó Unido on a one-year loan. On December 10, 2013, he won the Apertura 2013-14 with O'Higgins. In the tournament, he played in 10 of 18 matches, and scored a goal in the win 3:4 against Rangers de Talca.

In 2014, he won the Supercopa de Chile against Deportes Iquique, in the match that O'Higgins won at the penalty shoot-out.

He participated with the club in the 2014 Copa Libertadores where they faced Deportivo Cali, Cerro Porteño and Lanús, being third and being eliminated in the group stage.

In 2014, Huerta played for Deportes Antofagasta and in 2015 come back to Curicó Unido.

== Honours ==
=== Club ===
Deportes Antofagasta

- Primera B: Apertura 2011

O'Higgins

- Primera División: Apertura 2013-14
- Supercopa de Chile: 2014

=== Individual ===
O'Higgins

- Medalla Santa Cruz de Triana: 2014
