= Mariano Uglessich =

Argentine footballer

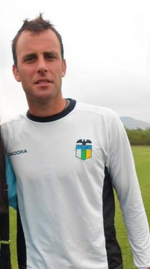

Personal information
- Full name: Mariano Esteban Uglessich
- Date of birth: 6 November 1981 (age 44)
- Place of birth: Buenos Aires, Argentina
- Height: 1.82 m (6 ft 0 in)
- Position: Defender

Youth career
- Vélez Sársfield

Senior career*
Years	Team	Apps	(Gls)
2001–2003	Vélez Sársfield	45	(0)
2004	Querétaro	15	(0)
2004–2008	Vélez Sársfield	106	(8)
2009	Arsenal	6	(0)
2009	Albacete	9	(0)
2010–2011	Olimpia Asunción	33	(0)
2011–2012	Cerro Porteño	43	(3)
2013–2014	O'Higgins	33	(2)
2014	Universidad Católica	18	(1)
2015–2015	Quilmes	7	(1)
- * Club domestic league appearances and goals as of 25 May 2015

Mariano Esteban Uglessich (born 6 November 1981 in Buenos Aires) is an Argentine former footballer who played as a defender.

== Career ==
=== Vélez Sarfield, Mexico and Arsenal ===
He started playing at Vélez Sársfield youth divisions, and debuted professionally on 22 February 2002. He played very briefly for the Mexican League System Segunda División de México Querétaro F.C. in the first quarter of 2004, but after that returned to Vélez Sársfield. He was part of the team that won the Torneo Clausura 2005 but he hardly ever played due to being overshadowed by Fabricio Fuentes, Maximiliano Pellegrino and Hernán Pellerano.

During the 2007–08 season, after Pellegrino's departure, Uglessich was a regular starter in Vélez. On 3 February 2009, the central defender left Velez Sarsfield by mutual consent with the club. Arsenal de Sarandí signed the former Velez Sarsfield.

=== Spain ===
On 12 August 2009, he signed with Albacete Balompié. On 7 January 2010 Albacete Balompié released the Argentine defender at his request.

=== Back to South America: Paraguay ===
After the match, he played on 8 January 2010, he used his Twitter account to make racial slurs about the Brazilian Players of Santos. In 2012, he signed with Cerro Porteño, where he was champion of the Torneo de Apertura 2012.

=== O'Higgins ===
In 2013, he signed with the Chilean Club O'Higgins, where he won the Apertura 2013–14. In the tournament, he played in 12 of the 18 matches. In 2014, he won the Supercopa de Chile with the club, playing against Deportes Iquique, and failing the fifth penalty in the penalty shoot-out.

He participated with the club in the 2014 Copa Libertadores where they faced Deportivo Cali, Cerro Porteño and Lanús, being third and being eliminated in the group stage.

He left the club in the second half of 2014, and signed with Universidad Católica del Ecuador.

== Titles ==
=== Club ===
Vélez Sarfield

- Primera División: Clausura 2005

Cerro Porteño

- División Profesional: Apertura 2012

O'Higgins

- Primera División: Apertura 2013–14
- Supercopa de Chile: 2014

=== Individual ===
O'Higgins

- Medalla Santa Cruz de Triana: 2014
