= Fernando Rojas (producer) =

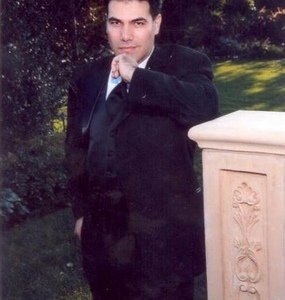
- Rojas in 2012
- Born: Fernando de Rojas; September 4, 1968 (age 57); Colombia
- Other name: Fernando de Rojas
- Occupations: producer; composer; writer; pianist; businessman; philanthropist; musician
- Musical career
- Genres: Instrumental; classical; soundtrack
- Instruments: Vocals; piano
- Years active: 2003–present
- Label: Flamingo Digital
- Website: flamingodigitalrecords.com

Fernando Rojas (born Carlos Fernando Rojas on September 4, 1968) is a Colombian-American producer, composer, writer, pianist and vocalist. Following international recognition of his song Melody in the Key of Love, in 2003 he represented the United States with his song In The Night I'll Be Dreaming of You in the 44th annual Viña del Mar International Song Festival in Chile. Rojas founded record company Flamingo Digital Records, which produces films, music and different projects.

== Career ==
=== Film career ===
Maria Full of Grace

Rojas worked with the production team, including producer Paul Mezey and director Joshua Marston, for the presentation of the 2004 drama film Maria Full of Grace at the Cartagena Film Festival. The film was successful, winning the Colombian Cinema Award for best actress (Catalina Moreno) and the Special Jury Prize for directing (Joshua Marston). The film was also nominated for an Academy Award and a Screen Actors Guild Award for Best Performance by an Actress in a Leading Role (Catalina Moreno).

Prince of Paupers

Rojas spearheaded production for the independent film "Prince of Paupers", which was co-produced by Audit Trail. Based on the memoirs of notable newscaster Guillermo Descalizis, the film chronicled Descalizis's life and his rise to prominence as the leading political commentator for the Spanish international networks Telemundo and Univision, his fall from fame and subsequent homelessness, and his gradual reascension to prominence. Some of the proceeds were to be donated to the memorial fund of Dick York, in celebration of the iconic American actor's philanthropy work.

Other ventures

In 2000 a Mira! tabloid featured Rojas alongside Brazilian actress Tais Araujo, discussing media collaborations.

=== Music career ===
Flamingo Digital Records

In 1997, Rojas began developing his own record label, Flamingo Digital Records, and produced his extended play and singles under the new record company. The first single was Rojas' own song, Melody In The Key of Love, which received television airtime and promotion on MTV. Rojas and his record label company also collaborated and composed music for Marla Maples.

Viña del Mar International Song Festival

In 2003, Rojas was selected to compete in the Viña del Mar International Song Festival, representing the United States of America. For the festival, he composed and produced an original song, entitled "In The Night I'll Be Dreaming of You", The song was performed by a full orchestra and soprano Gabrielle Sterbenz as featured vocalist. It was nominated for the Gaviota de Oro award. In addition to an all-English version, a bilingual English-Spanish version was also performed. Rojas was present and served as the pianist at the event, overseeing production and orchestration.

=== Discography ===
EP's

- Melody in the Key of Love (2014)

Singles

- Storybook Romance (2012)
- El Camino De La Vida (2013)
- Entre Dos Aguas (2014)

== Public and political involvement ==
Rojas has voiced his support for Donald Trump, and aided his 2016 U.S. presidential campaign. Upon writing to British politician Nigel Farage, Farage was invited to a Trump event, where showed support for the latter. Rojas' record label was also instrumental in producing a commercial in support of the Trump 2016 campaign (featuring his song), which focused on Trump's work in support of women and families. In a 2020 interview for Soul Central Magazine, Rojas said: “Trump has done much for Latinos in the US. Employment for them, like for other minorities, went up drastically. With these jobs came more pride and prosperity ... His diligence in protecting our borders, improving our economy and making education better in impoverished areas have all been a strong benefit to the Latino community in the US.”

Rojas is the Director of the official Tribute of WWII Veteran and influential businessman John G. Ibe, recognized by the White House. Ibe, who survived the war, became a leading entrepreneur in the aerospace industry and real estate, and built monuments for fallen soldiers.

== Personal life ==
Rojas was born in Bogota, Colombia in 1968, to a musical family with two sisters. His family emigrated to New York City in 1981, and he has resided in the city since then.
