= Richard Catrileo =

Chilean footballer (born 1992)

Personal information
- Full name: Richard Francisco Catrileo Cifuentes
- Date of birth: 26 June 1992 (age 34)
- Place of birth: Santiago, Chile
- Height: 1.65 m (5 ft 5 in)
- Position: Midfielder

Senior career*
Years	Team	Apps	(Gls)
2012–2016	Cobreloa	22	(3)
2014	→ Rangers (loan)	6	(0)
2015	→ Colchagua (loan)	10	(0)
2016–2017	San Marcos de Arica	6	(0)
- * Club domestic league appearances and goals as of 29 March 2020

Richard Francisco Catrileo Cifuentes (born 26 June 1992) was a Chilean footballer. His last club was San Marcos de Arica.
