= Braulio Leal =

Chilean footballer (born 1981)

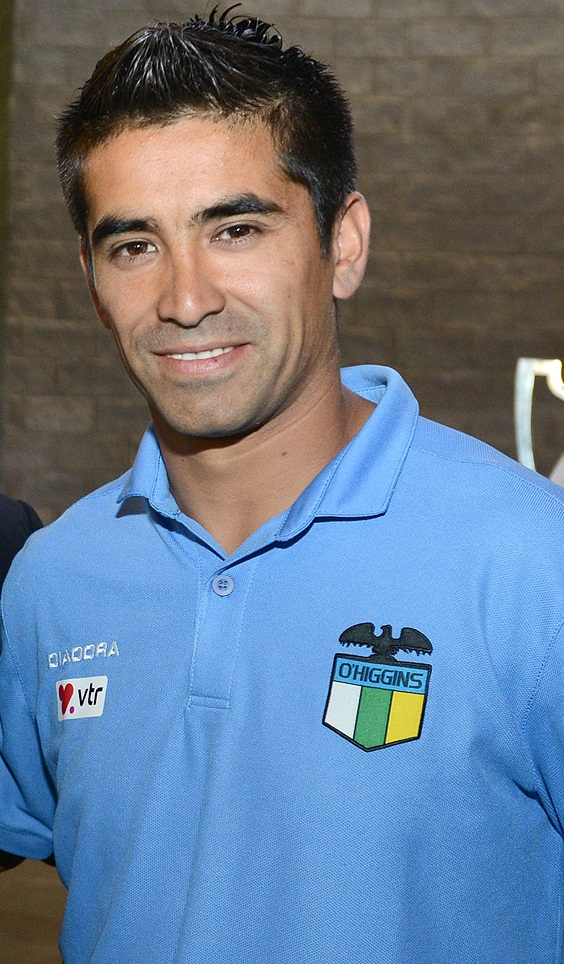
- Leal with O'Higgins in 2013

Personal information
- Full name: Braulio Antonio Leal Salvo
- Date of birth: 22 November 1981 (age 44)
- Place of birth: Santiago, Chile
- Height: 1.73 m (5 ft 8 in)
- Position: Midfielder

Team information
- Current team: Colo-Colo (youth) (coach)

Youth career
- Colo-Colo

Senior career*
Years	Team	Apps	(Gls)
2000–2006	Colo-Colo	145	(10)
2004	→ Vitória SC (loan)	25	(4)
2006	Everton	15	(4)
2007–2009	Audax Italiano	79	(15)
2009–2012	Unión Española	108	(15)
2013–2016	O'Higgins	104	(9)
2016–2018	San Luis	45	(2)
2019	Deportes Iquique	12	(0)
2019–2021	Magallanes	50	(7)
Total		583	(66)

International career
2004	Chile U23	6	(1)
2009–2014	Chile	7	(0)

Managerial career
- 2022–2023: Magallanes (youth)
- 2023: Magallanes (interim)
- 2024: Magallanes (assistant)
- 2024: Magallanes (caretaker)
- 2025: Magallanes
- 2025–: Colo-Colo (youth)
- * Club domestic league appearances and goals

Braulio Antonio Leal Salvo (born 22 November 1981) is a Chilean football coach and former player who played as a midfielder.

== Club career ==
=== Youth career ===
Fuentes started his career at Primera División de Chile club Colo-Colo. He progressed from the under categories club all the way to the senior team.

=== Chile and Portugal ===
He began his professional career in 2000 with Colo-Colo where he stayed until 2006. In the club he achieved two tournaments, the Clausura 2002 and the Apertura 2006. As an anecdote, in 2005 he took part of the reality TV show Adidas Selection Team from Fox Sports Chile, where a squad made up by youth players from professional teams faced players from schools, standing out future professional footballers such as Felipe Seymour, Nelson Saavedra, Eduardo Vargas, among others.

In 2004, he had a short stint with Portuguese club Vitória Sport Clube. In 2007, he signed for Audax Italiano, where he has become a fixture in the starting eleven. But in 2009 Unión Española signed this defensive midfielder, then became the captain of the team.

=== O'Higgins ===
Leal in 2013 signed for O'Higgins along with teammate Gonzalo Barriga. On 10 December 2013 he won the Apertura 2013-14 with O'Higgins and was the captain of team. In the tournament, he played in 13 of 18 matches. In 2014, he won the Supercopa de Chile against Deportes Iquique.

He participated with the club in the 2014 Copa Libertadores where they faced Deportivo Cali, Cerro Porteño and Lanús, being third and being eliminated in the group stage.

=== Magallanes ===
On 5 June 2019, Leal joined Deportes Magallanes.

=== Retirement ===
In November 2021, he announced his retirement from the football activity after a 22-year career. However, he and the also former professional footballer, Andrés Reyes, joined amateur club Gol y Gol from Vivanco, Río Bueno, for the 2023 South Zone Inter Regional Championship.

== Coaching career ==
Following his retirement, Leal assumed as the Technical Head of the Magallanes youth system, at the same he performs as coach. During 2024, he served as assistant coach of Ronald Fuentes. He assumed as head coach for the 2025 season.

In October 2025, Leal switched to Colo-Colo as the coach of the under 20's.

== Honours ==
=== Player ===
Colo-Colo

- Primera División de Chile (2): 2002 Clausura, 2006 Apertura

O'Higgins

- Primera División (1): 2013 Apertura
- Supercopa de Chile: 2014

Individual

- Medalla Santa Cruz de Triana: 2014
