= Nicolás Ortiz (footballer, born 1984) =

Chilean footballer

Nicolás Ortíz
Personal information
- Full name: Nicolás Patricio Ortíz Vergara
- Date of birth: 6 April 1984 (age 42)
- Place of birth: Santiago, Chile
- Height: 1.75 m (5 ft 9 in)
- Position: Defender

Senior career*
Years	Team	Apps	(Gls)
2004–2007	Santiago Morning	2	(0)
2008–2011	Coquimbo Unido	85	(1)
2009	→ San Marcos (loan)	32	(0)
2012–2017	Unión La Calera	58	(1)
2013–2014	→ Deportes Iquique (loan)	47	(2)
2014–2015	→ Deportes Antofagasta (loan)	10	(0)
2017–2021	Barnechea	83	(1)
Total		317	(5)
- * Club domestic league appearances and goals

Nicolás Patricio Ortíz Vergara (born 6 April 1984) is a Chilean former professional footballer who played as a defender.

== Career ==
A product of Santiago Morning youth system, he played for several clubs in the Chilean Primera División and Primera B. At the end of 2021 season, A.C. Barnechea announced the retirement of Ortiz along with his teammate Cristián Muñoz from the football activity as a professional footballer.

At international level, Ortiz was part of a Chile under-25 squad in a training session led by Claudio Borghi in May 2011, alongside his teammates in Coquimbo Unido, Carlos Ross and Carlos Escobar.

He retired at the end of the 2021 season

== Honours ==
Deportes Iquique

- Copa Chile: 2013–14
