= Santiago Lizana =

Chilean footballer (born 1992)

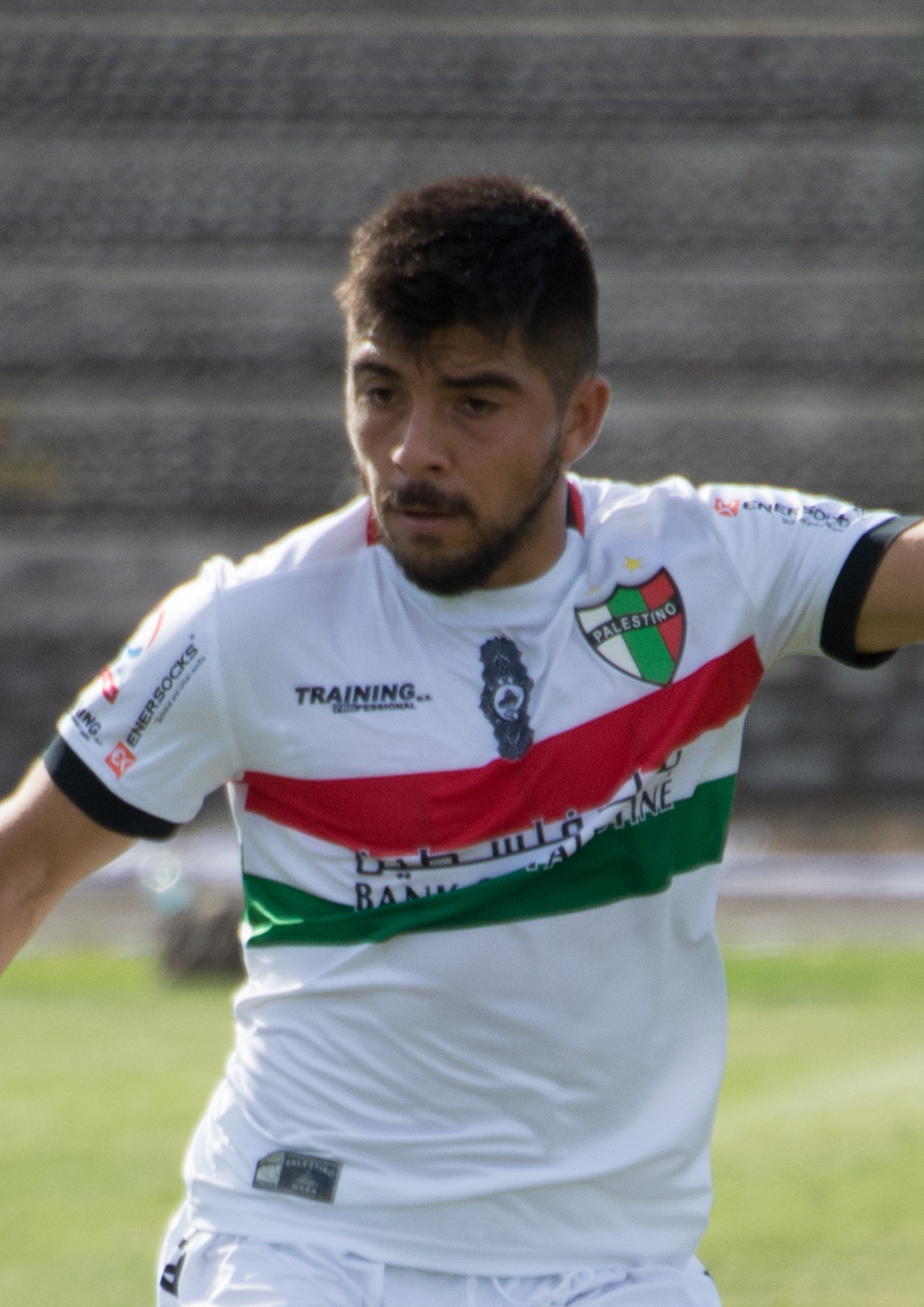
- Lizana in 2018

Personal information
- Full name: Santiago Nicolás Lizana Lizana
- Date of birth: 30 September 1992 (age 34)
- Place of birth: Rancagua, Chile
- Height: 1.63 m (5 ft 4 in)
- Position: Midfielder

Team information
- Current team: Santiago Morning
- Number: 20

Youth career
- O'Higgins

Senior career*
Years	Team	Apps	(Gls)
2011–2017	O'Higgins	17	(0)
2018–2019	Palestino	16	(1)
2020–	Santiago Morning	13	(0)
- * Club domestic league appearances and goals as of 16 December 2020

Santiago Nicolás Lizana Lizana (born 30 September 1992) is a Chilean footballer who currently plays for Santiago Morning.

== Career ==
=== Youth career ===
Lizana started his career at Primera División de Chile club O'Higgins. He progressed from the under categories club all the way to the senior team.

=== O'Higgins ===
In 2012, Lizana was runner-up with O'Higgins, after losing the final against Universidad de Chile in the penalty shoot-out.

Lizana won the Apertura 2013-14 with O'Higgins, in the 2013–14 Súper Final Apertura against Universidad Católica, being the first title for O'Higgins.

In 2014, he won the Supercopa de Chile against Deportes Iquique, in a match that O'Higgins won at the penalty shoot-out.

He participated with the club in the 2014 Copa Libertadores, where they faced Deportivo Cali, Cerro Porteño and Lanús, finishing third and being eliminated in the group stage.

== Honours ==
=== Club ===
O'Higgins

- Primera División: Apertura 2013-14
- Supercopa de Chile: 2014

Palestino

- Copa Chile: 2018

=== Individual ===
O'Higgins

- Medalla Santa Cruz de Triana: 2014
