= Cristhian Subero =

Colombian footballer (born 1991)

Personal information
- Full name: Cristhian Camilo Subero Mier
- Date of birth: May 26, 1991 (age 35)
- Place of birth: Santa Marta, Magdalena, Colombia
- Height: 1.70 m (5 ft 7 in)
- Position: Right back

Team information
- Current team: Atlético Bucaramanga
- Number: 24

Youth career
- 2008: Millonarios

Senior career*
| Years | Team | Apps | (Gls) |
| 2009–2012 | Millonarios | 5 | (1) |
| 2013 | Boyacá Chicó | 1 | (0) |
| 2014 | Patriotas Boyacá | 5 | (1) |
| 2015–2016 | América de Cali | 25 | (0) |
| 2016 | Real Cartagena | 13 | (0) |
| 2017–2019 | Unión Magdalena | 83 | (1) |
| 2020– | Atlético Bucaramanga | 4 | (0) |
- * Club domestic league appearances and goals as of 20:00, 25 May 2020 (UTC)

Cristhian Camilo Subero Mier (Note: In this Spanish name, the first or paternal surname is Subero and the second or maternal family name is Mier.) (born 26 May 1991) is a Colombian football player, who currently plays as a right back for Atlético Bucaramanga in the Categoría Primera A.

Subero is a product of the Millonarios youth system and played with the Millonarios first team between 2009 and 2012.

== Statistics (Official games/Colombian Ligue and Colombian Cup) ==
(As of November 14, 2010)

| Year | Team | Colombian Ligue Matches | Goals | Colombian Cup Matches | Goals | Total Matches | Total Goals |
|---|---|---|---|---|---|---|---|
| 2009 | Millonarios | 4 | 1 | 3 | 0 | 7 | 1 |
| 2010 | Millonarios | 1 | 0 | 4 | 0 | 5 | 0 |
| Total | Millonarios | 5 | 1 | 7 | 0 | 12 | 1 |
