= Fernando Rojas Ochagavía =

Chilean civil engineer and politician (born 1974)

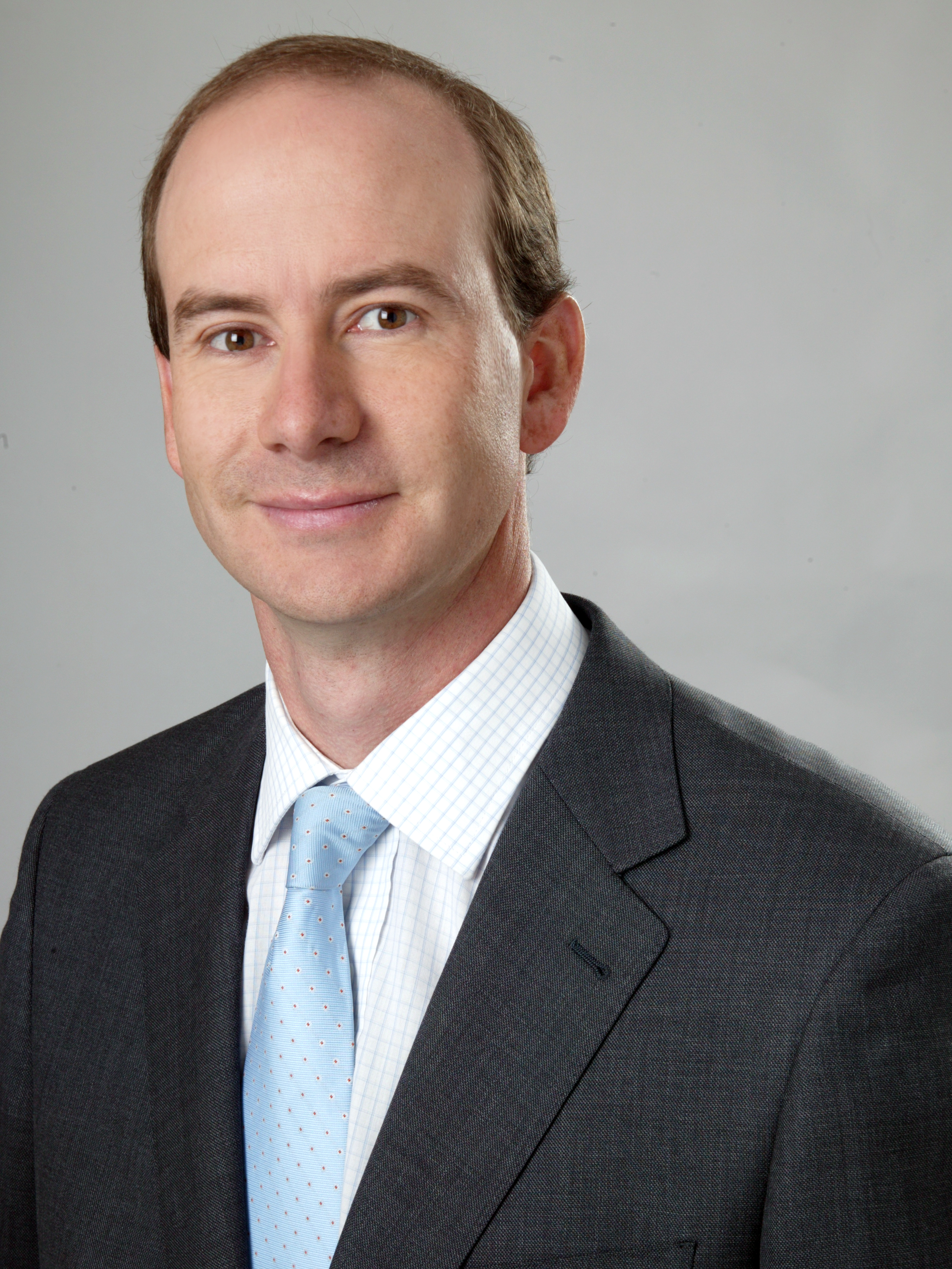
Image of Fernando Rojas

Fernando Rojas Ochagavía (September 14, 1974) is a Chilean civil engineer and politician, member of the Independent Democratic Union (UDI). He served as Undersecretary of Education during the first government of President Sebastián Piñera (2010–2014). He currently serves as Dean of the Faculty of Engineering at the Universidad del Desarrollo.

== Biography ==
Fernando Rojas attended Tabancura College before studying civil engineering at the Pontifical Catholic University of Chile. While there, he served as vice-president of the Engineering Student Center (1996), Student Federation (1997), and Senior Advisor (1998).

After completing his studies, he worked as Executive Secretary of the Nahuelbuta Municipalities Association, as part of the "Youth at the Service of Chile" program of the Jaime Guzmán Foundation. Later, he left to pursue a master's degree in Public Policy from Harvard University, for which he was awarded the Fulbright, World Bank, and President of the Republic scholarships.

He served as the director of the communal planning secretariat for the Municipality of Santiago under Joaquín Lavín's mayoralty.

He served as the planning and commercial manager of AFP Habitat and has also taught at the Catholic University. He was director of Coaniquem and is currently director of the Súmate Foundation at Hogar de Cristo.

He is married and father of seven children. Since July 2016, he has served as dean of the Faculty of Engineering at Universidad del Desarrollo.

== Awards ==
He was awarded the Colegio de Ingenieros de Chile award and the Ismael Valdés distinction from the Instituto de Ingenieros de Chile. Additionally, he was recognized as one of the 100 Young Leaders of 2004 by the magazine El Sábado and the newspaper El Mercurio.
