= Gonzalo Barriga =

Chilean footballer (born 1984)

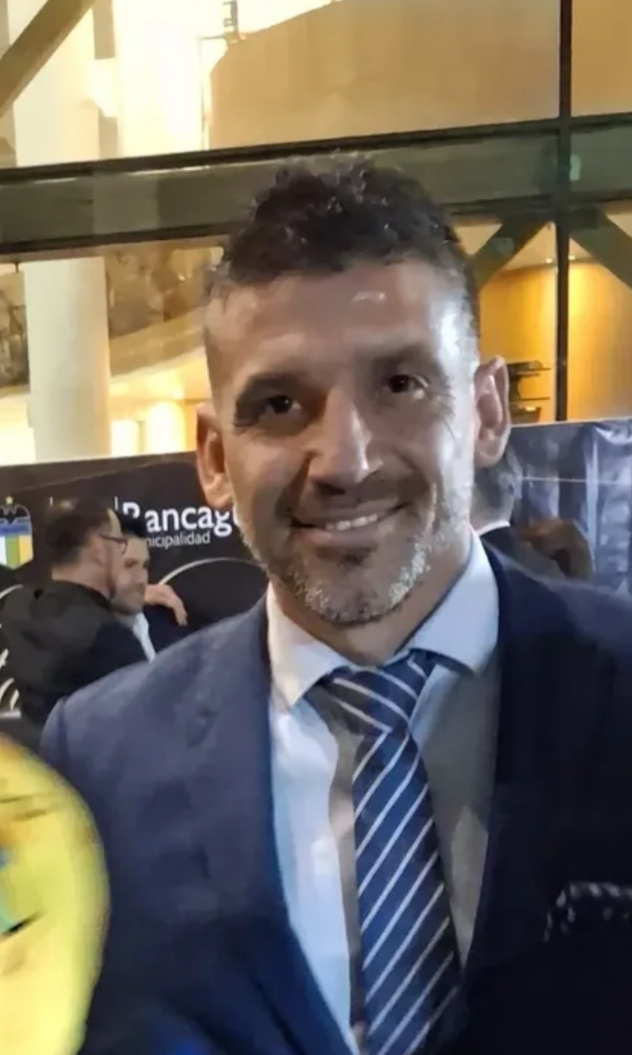
- Barriga in 2025.

Personal information
- Full name: Gonzalo Felipe Barriga Ahumada
- Date of birth: 21 June 1984 (age 42)
- Place of birth: Santiago, Chile
- Height: 1.75 m (5 ft 9 in)
- Positions: Left midfielder; left-back

Youth career
- 1998: Colo-Colo

Senior career*
Years	Team	Apps	(Gls)
2008–2009	Provincial Chacabuco	–	(–)
2009	Deportes Melipilla	24	(1)
2010–2011	Unión La Calera	58	(9)
2011–2012	Unión Española	41	(5)
2013–2017	O'Higgins	81	(6)
2014–2015	→ Santiago Wanderers (loan)	33	(2)
2017	Deportes Antofagasta	1	(0)
2018	Unión La Calera	12	(0)
Total		250	(23)

International career
2014	Chile	1	(0)
- * Club domestic league appearances and goals

Gonzalo Felipe Barriga Ahumada (born 21 June 1984) is a retired Chilean footballer who played as a left midfielder.

== Club career ==
Barriga had a brief stint at the Colo-Colo youth ranks, aged 13.

After ending his career of engineering at Duoc UC, Barriga was discovered playing for Provincial Chacabuco by the Dutchman Jorrit Smink, then the Deportes Melipilla coach, and convinced him to play at homogeneous city-based team.

In January 2013, Barriga joined O'Higgins along his Unión Española teammate Braulio Leal.

On 10 December 2013, he won the 2013–14 Apertura with O'Higgins. During the tournament, he played in 17 matches and scored one goal in a win 2–1 against Deportes Antofagasta.

In 2014, he won the Supercopa de Chile against Deportes Iquique.

He participated with the club in the 2014 Copa Libertadores where they faced Deportivo Cali, Cerro Porteño and Lanús, being third and being eliminated in the group stage.

== Personal life ==
He was titled as engineer after attending Duoc UC.

Barriga became a fan of O'Higgins and made his home in Rancagua.

== Honors ==
O'Higgins

- Primera División de Chile (1): 2013 Apertura
- Supercopa de Chile (1): 2014

Individual

- Medalla Santa Cruz de Triana: 2014
