= Cristhian Venegas =

Chilean footballer (born 1993)

Personal information
- Full name: Cristhian Andrés Venegas Yañez
- Date of birth: 27 May 1993 (age 33)
- Place of birth: Los Ángeles, Chile
- Height: 1.79 m (5 ft 10 1/2 in)
- Position: Defender

Youth career
- O'Higgins

Senior career*
Years	Team	Apps	(Gls)
2013–2018	O'Higgins	6	(0)
2015–2016	→ Santa Cruz (loan)	30	(1)
2016–2017	→ Deportes Iberia (loan)	9	(0)
2017–2018	→ Malleco Unido (loan)	38	(3)
2019	Deportes Valdivia	19	(1)
- * Club domestic league appearances and goals as of 4 April 2020

Cristhian Venegas (born 27 May 1993) is a Chilean footballer who plays as a defender.

== Career ==
=== Youth career ===
Venegas started his career at Primera División de Chile club O'Higgins. He progressed from the under categories club all the way to the senior team.

=== O'Higgins ===
Venegas won the Apertura 2013-14 with O'Higgins, in the 2013–14 Súper Final Apertura against Universidad Católica, being the first title for O'Higgins.

In 2014, he won the Supercopa de Chile against Deportes Iquique, in the match that O'Higgins won at the penalty shoot-out.

He participated with the club in the 2014 Copa Libertadores where they faced Deportivo Cali, Cerro Porteño and Lanús, being third and being eliminated in the group stage.

== Honours ==
=== Club ===
O'Higgins

- Primera División: Apertura 2013-14
- Supercopa de Chile: 2014

=== Individual ===
O'Higgins

- Medalla Santa Cruz de Triana: 2014
