= Monasterio Celeste =

Sports training facility in Requínoa, Chile

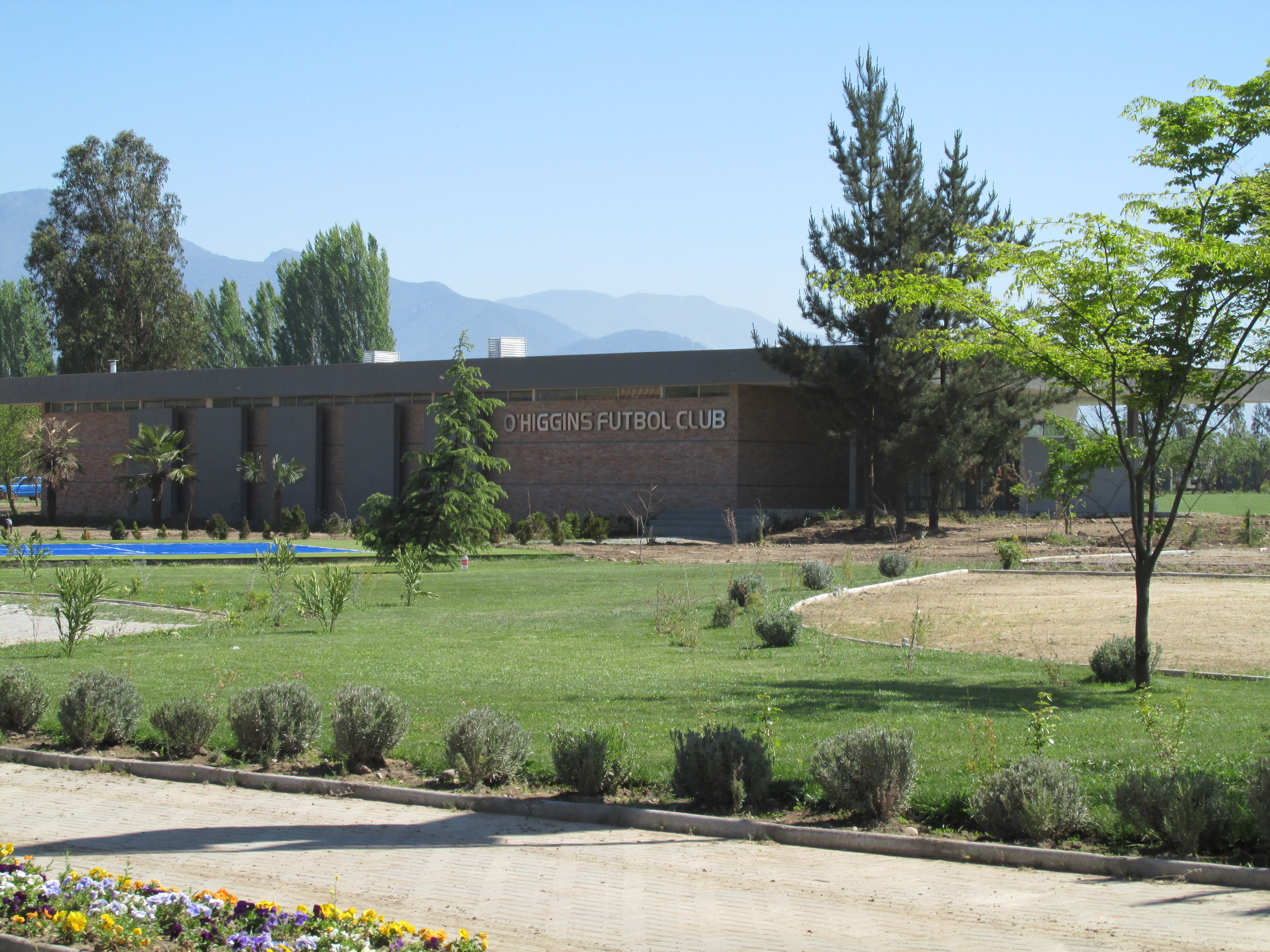
- The complex entrance
- Interactive map of Monasterio Celeste
- Location: Parcela San José, Santa Lucila s/n Requínoa, Chile
- Coordinates: 34°15′5.93″S 70°49′59.38″W
- Owner: O'Higgins
- Type: Sports facility

Construction
- Opened: 2014
- Cost: US$ 6 million

Website
- http://www.ohigginsfc.cl/

Monasterio Celeste is the O'Higgins training facilities located outside Rancagua in Requínoa, Chile. It replaces La Gamboína, which until 2015 will be the training ground of the club.

Also, is one of the most modern football complex in South America and was a host complex for the Venezuela national football team in 2015 Copa América.

== The Complex ==
The complex is located in the Las Mercedes in the commune of Requínoa, Cachapoal Province, near the city of Rancagua. It was acquired by O'Higgins in 2006 by USD 6 million, under the presidency of Ricardo Abumohor.

The complex will consist of seven pitches of natural grass, a mini-stadium of artificial grass, and a hotel with the facilities for the team. The complex was finished in 2014, but the first-team of O'Higgins training for first time on January 4, 2013.

Brazil national football team coach Dunga visited the complex looking for a pre-season complex for the 2015 Copa America, but finally they do not train in the complex because their matches will be in other cities.

The Chile national football team will perform the pre-season up prior to the start of the 2015 Copa America.

== Facilities ==
- Club House
- Physiotherapy Area
- Saunas
- Locker room area (first team and youth)
- Gym (professional staff)
- Gym (youth team)
- Building Props
- Communications Room
- Hotel
- Casino
- Player Home
- Field 1: Football (100 x 68 meters). Natural grass.
- Field 2: Football (100 x 65 meters). Natural grass.
- Field 3: Football (100 x 65 meters). Natural grass.
- Field 4: Football (100 x 65 meters). Natural grass.
- Field 5: Football (100 x 65 meters). Natural grass. (Stands for 400 spectators)
- Field 6: Football (100 x 65 meters). Natural grass. (Stands for 400 spectators)
- Field 7: Football (100 x 65 meters). Artificial grass.
- Press room
- Building with changing rooms and toilets (Professional team)
- Building with changing rooms and toilets (Youth team)
- Pool (planned)

== Access ==
The enclosure is 24 k from the city of Rancagua, in the town of Santa Lucila in Requínoa. To access the site must travel through the Autopista del Maipo and access by road Las Mercedes.

== See also ==
- Requínoa
- O'Higgins
