= Felipe Ochagavía =

Chilean footballer (born 1993)

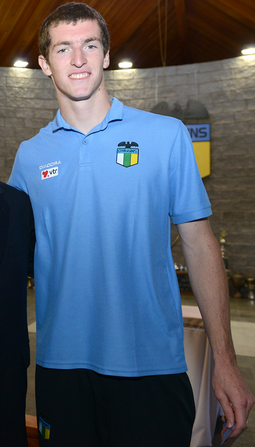
- Ochagavía in 2014

Personal information
- Full name: Felipe Ochagavía Eguiguren
- Date of birth: 16 September 1993 (age 33)
- Place of birth: Rancagua, Chile
- Height: 1.95 m (6 ft 5 in)
- Position: Goalkeeper

Youth career
- 2010–2012: O'Higgins

Senior career*
Years	Team	Apps	(Gls)
2012–2017	O'Higgins	1	(0)
2012	→ Academia Machalí (loan)	–	(–)
2015	→ Celta Vigo B (loan)	0	(0)
2016–2017	→ Magallanes (loan)	1	(0)
- * Club domestic league appearances and goals

Felipe Ochagavía Eguiguren (born 9 September 1993) is a Chilean former professional footballer who played as a goalkeeper.

== Career ==
=== Youth career ===
Ochagavía started his career at Primera División de Chile club O'Higgins. He progressed from the under categories club all the way to the senior team.

=== O'Higgins ===
Ochagavía won the Apertura 2013-14 with O'Higgins. In the tournament, he didn't play in any game.

In 2014, he won the Supercopa de Chile against Deportes Iquique. In that match, he was in the bench as the second goalkeeper.

He participated with the club in the 2014 Copa Libertadores where they faced Deportivo Cali, Cerro Porteño and Lanús, being third and being eliminated in the group stage.

=== Celta Vigo B (loan) ===
In 2015, he had a stint with Celta Vigo B in the Segunda División B.

=== Magallanes (loan) ===
From 2016 to 2017, he played for Magallanes in the Primera B de Chile.

== Personal life ==
Following his retirement, he started his studies at the Pontifical Catholic University of Chile and got a degree in business management.

At university level, he played for the Catholic University team.

== Honours ==
O'Higgins

- Primera División: Apertura 2013-14
- Supercopa de Chile: 2014
