= Chilean Football Youth Leagues =

Chilean youth football leagues

The football Youth Leagues in Chile go from U8 to U20.
