= Estadio El Teniente =

Stadium in Rancagua, Chile

Estadio Codelco El Teniente
- Templo de las Ilusiones (Temple of Illusions); El Mundialista de Rancagua (The World Cup Stadium of Rancagua)
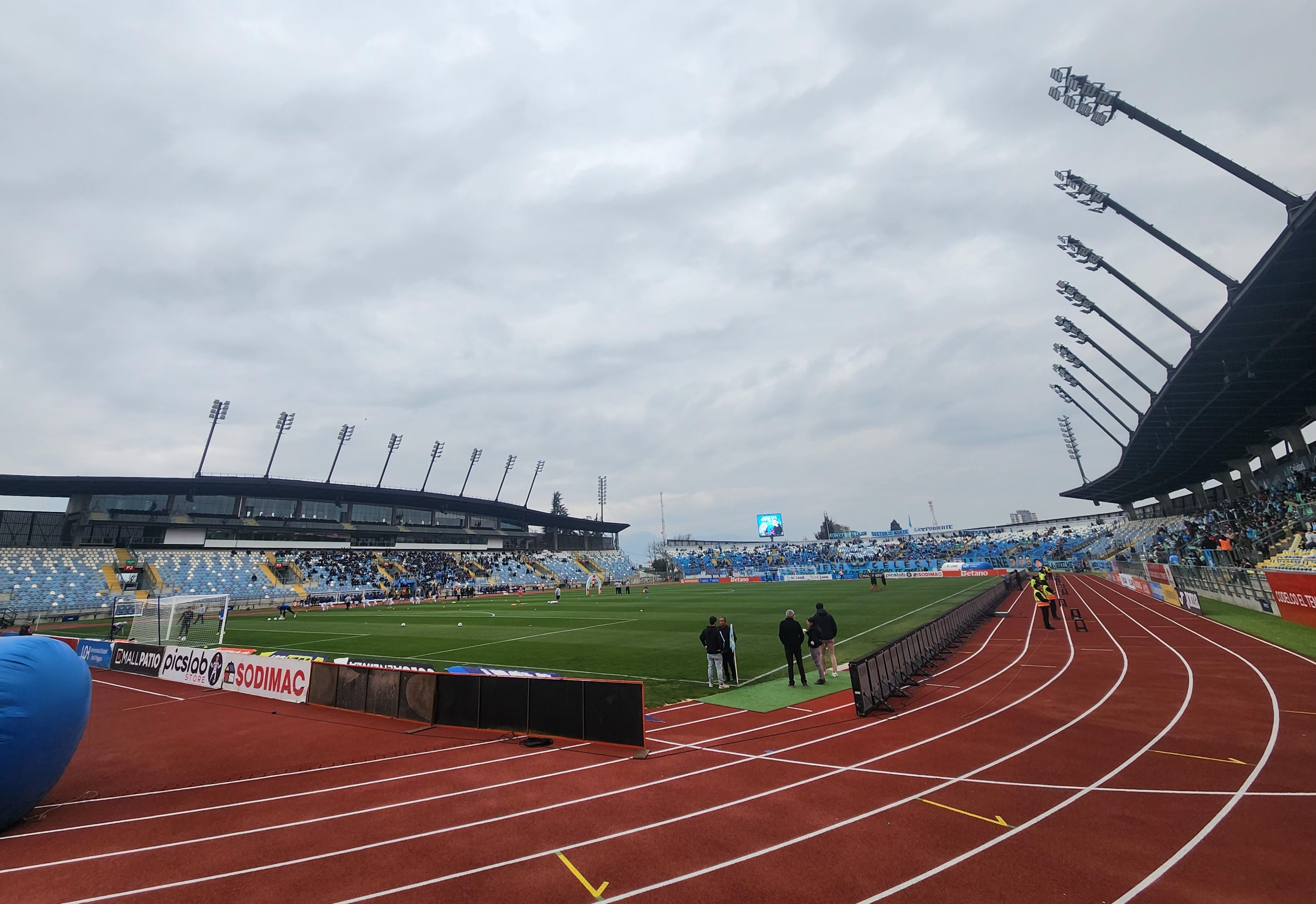
- The stadium in the reopening in September 2025.
- Interactive map of Estadio Codelco El Teniente
- Full name: Estadio El Teniente-Codelco
- Former names: Estadio Braden Copper Co. (1947–1971); Estadio Parque El Teniente (1971–2014)
- Location: Rancagua, Chile
- Coordinates: 34°10′40″S 70°44′15″W
- Owner: Codelco
- Operator: Codelco El Teniente
- Capacity: 14,087; 12,476 (international)
- Executive suites: 750 seats
- Surface: Grass (natural)
- Scoreboard: Digital (LED)
- Field size: 105 x 68 m
- Public transit: Trans O'Higgins

Construction
- Groundbreaking: 1 June 1945
- Built: 1945–1947 (2 years)
- Opened: 1947
- Renovated: 1995, 2013–14
- Expanded: 1962
- Reopened: 6 March 2014
- Demolished: 2013
- Cost: $9,900,000
- Architects: Gerardo Marambio; Claudio Aceituno; Pablo Allende; Pedro Pinochet
- Project manager: IND–Chilestadios
- General contractor: Cerinco

Tenants
- O'Higgins (1955–present); Audax Italiano (2021–22); Universidad de Chile (2021)

Website
- www.ohigginsfc.cl

Estadio El Teniente, also known as Estadio Codelco El Teniente for sponsorship reasons, is a multi-purpose stadium in Rancagua, Chile. It is currently used mostly for football matches. The stadium can fit 14,087 people and was built in 1945 with the name Braden Copper Company Stadium (Estadio Braden Copper Co.). The stadium is home to football club O'Higgins, which is based in Rancagua.

The stadium hosted seven matches of 1962 FIFA World Cup, where played matches of the group stage and quarter-finals. In 2013, the stadium was renovated for hosting the 2015 Copa América, to be played in Chile. Two matches of the group stage were played in this stadium. El Teniente was a host of the 2025 FIFA U-20 World Cup.

== History ==
=== Construction ===
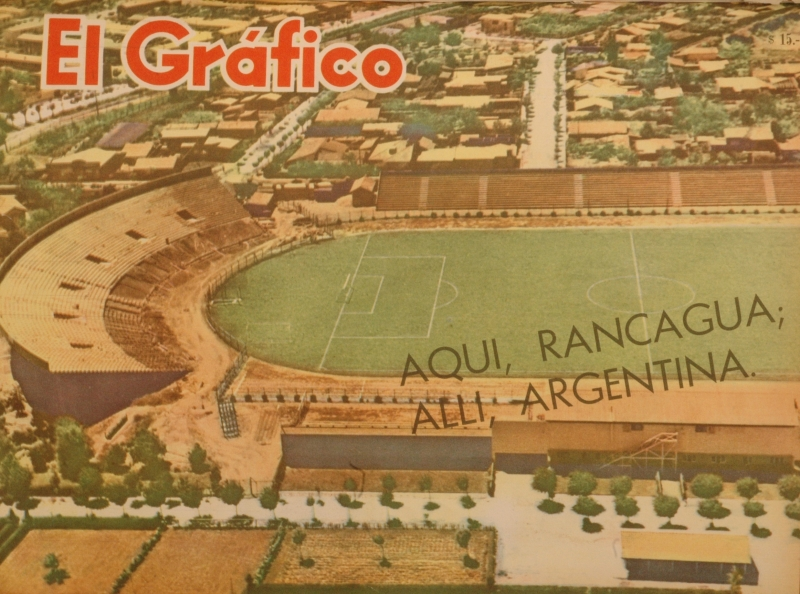
The stadium in El Gráfico magazine in 1962.

The stadium, since its construction, was owned by the U.S. copper mining company Braden Copper Company, which operated the mineral-extraction complex "El Teniente".

The designation of the Braden Copper Stadium to host matches in the 1962 FIFA World Cup was due to an emergency. Indeed, the 1960 Valdivia earthquake severely damaged or destroyed facilities in some of the originally-designated host cities of the FIFA World Cup in 1962 including Talca, Concepción, Talcahuano and Valdivia, which caused the original schedule to be discarded and forced its almost complete modification. Further, Antofagasta and Valparaíso were deterred from fulfilling their offers to host because they could not feasibly construct self-funded stadiums, a condition that had been imposed by the Federation due to its own lack of resources. However, given the bleak outlook for the organization, the U.S. mining interests allowed the use of their stadium in Rancagua.

=== Nationalization of copper ===
The Government of Chile acquired in 1967 51% of the shares of Braden Copper Co., as part of the general nationalization of copper, which concluded in 1971. Therefore, the ownership and management of the "Estadio Braden Copper" passed to the state-owned corporation Codelco Chile, which led to the name change to the current one.

=== New stadium ===
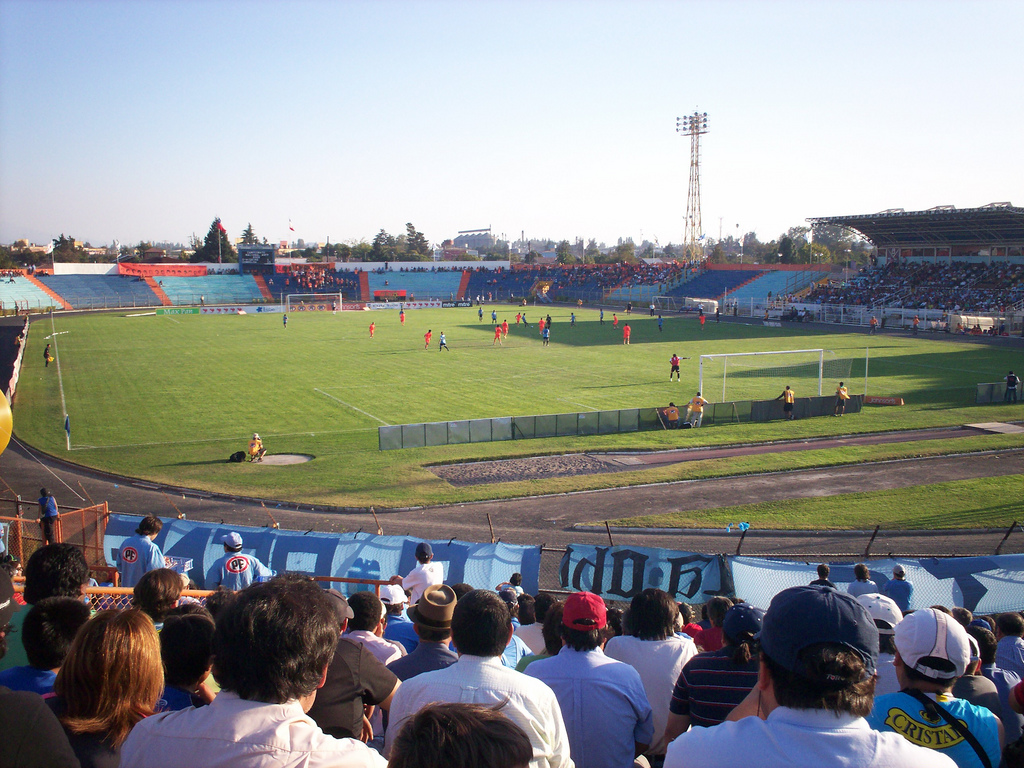
The stadium prior to reconstruction 2014 renovation

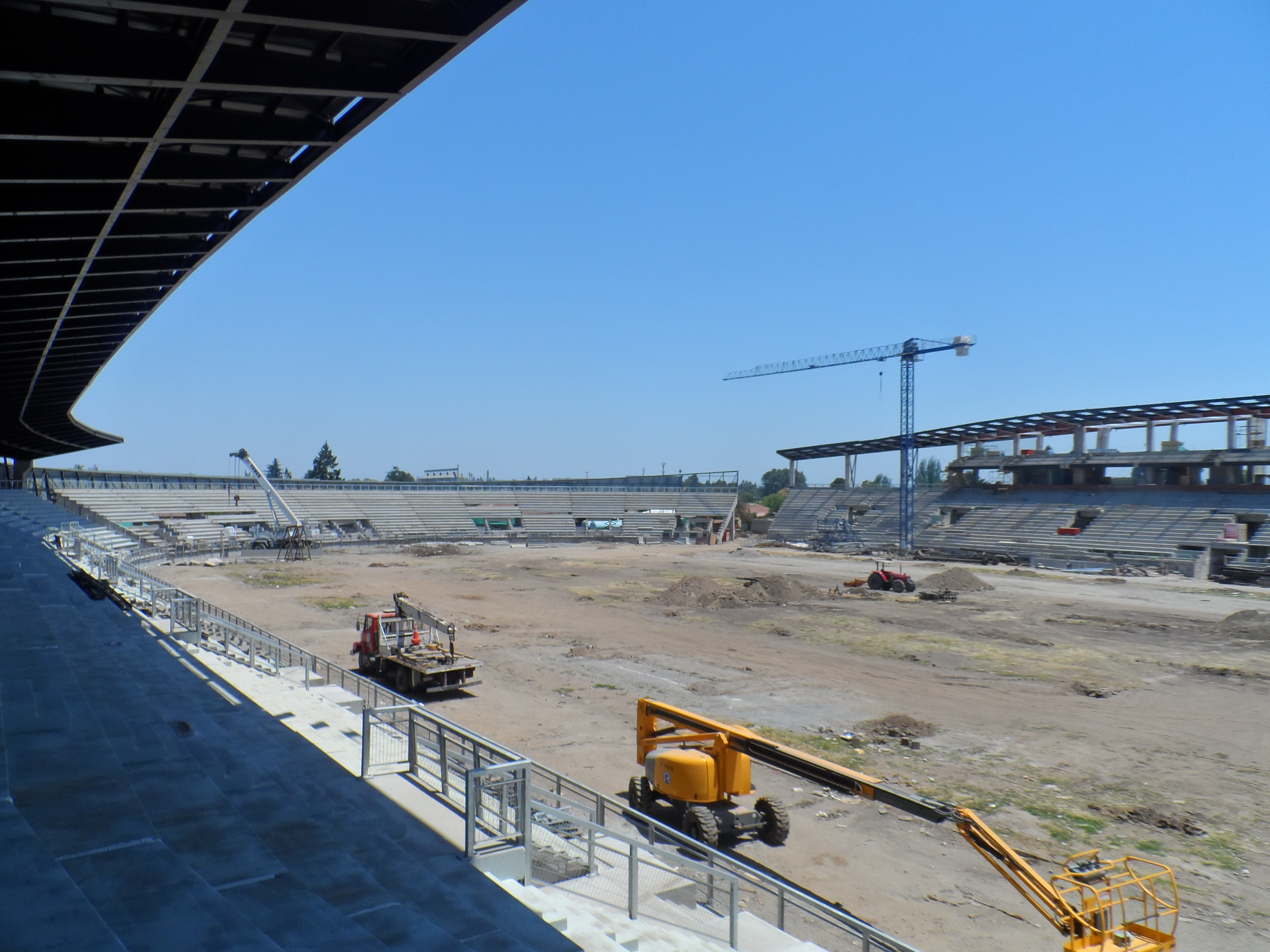
The stadium during renovation

On May 21, 2008, the then-president Michelle Bachelet announced the "Red de Estadios para el Bicentenario", a programme in which w new stadiums were built and upgrades planned for others, among which was the Estadio El Teniente. However, remodeling El Teniente was not executed during the term of Bachelet, although this was projected, due to the 2010 Chilean earthquake.

On September 2, 2012, President Sebastian Piñera announced in Rancagua the final draft of the plans for remodelling the stadium, which will have a capacity of 15 000 spectators. Construction began on February 19, 2013, and delivery is planned for early 2014.

The Asociación Nacional de Fútbol Profesional (ANFP) announced in December 2012 that El Teniente had been selected to host the 2015 Copa América, along with Santiago, Antofagasta, La Serena, Valparaíso, Viña del Mar, Concepción and Temuco. Host venue contested with the city of Talca, however Rancagua was chosen due to its closer proximity to the Chilean capital.

==== Inaugural match ====
In the inaugural match, O'Higgins played against Lanús for the week 6 of the 2014 Copa Libertadores. The final result was 0–0, marking the elimination of the club from the competition, as they needed a victory to advance to the next round.

8 April 2014 2014 Copa Libertadores; Week 6	O'Higgins	0–0	Lanús	Rancagua, Chile
22:00	Calandria (penalty missed) 86'	Report		Stadium: El Teniente; Attendance: 10,651; Referee: Wilton Sampaio (Brazil)

== Areas ==
The stadium has 5 sectors since her renovation, the Palco has 375 seats, and the totality of the other four sectors are 13,464.

- Gradería Angostura currently known as Galería 16 (North Side)
- Gradería Andes (East Side)
- Gradería Rengo (South Side)
- Marquesina (West Side)
- Palco (VIP suite)

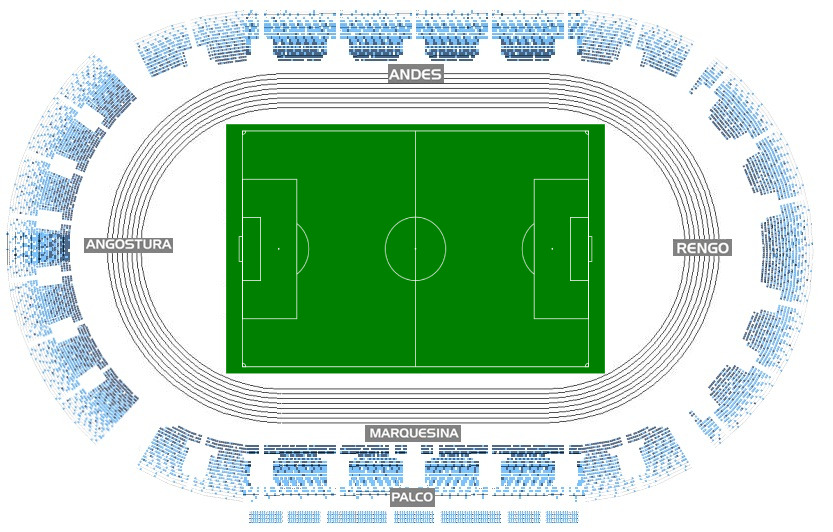
Map of the sectors of the stadium

The information on entrances, including exits, is available in three languages inside the stadium.

- (Chile) Chilean Spanish
- (United Kingdom) English
- Mapudungun

=== Name of the sub-stands ===
Inside the stadium, in each area of the stands there are places to name each of the sub-stands that are there depending on their location, having a relationship with places in Chile located in the direction that they point or with copper mining facilities belonging to Codelco.

Legend: Sub-stands Exits

- Gradería Angostura Los 16

GABY	N1	VENTANAS	N2	ANDINA	N3	CHUQUICAMATA	N4	MINISTRO HALES	N5	RADOMIRO TOMIC	N6	EL SALVADOR

- Gradería Andes

CHAPA VERDE	A1	COLÓN	A2	CALETONES	A3	COYA	A4	SEWELL	A5	CIPRESES	A6	SAUZAL	A7	BARAHONA

- Gradería Marquesina

CARÉN	P1	ALHUÉ	P2	QUILLAY	P3	LOICA	P4	SAN ANTONIO	P5	RAPEL	P6	VALPARAÍSO	P7	LONCHA

- Gradería Rengo

OROCOIPO	S1	LOS LIRIOS	S2	COINCO	S3	RÍO LOCO	S4	CACHAPOAL	S5	COLINAS VERDES	S6	COLIHUES

== 1962 World Cup ==
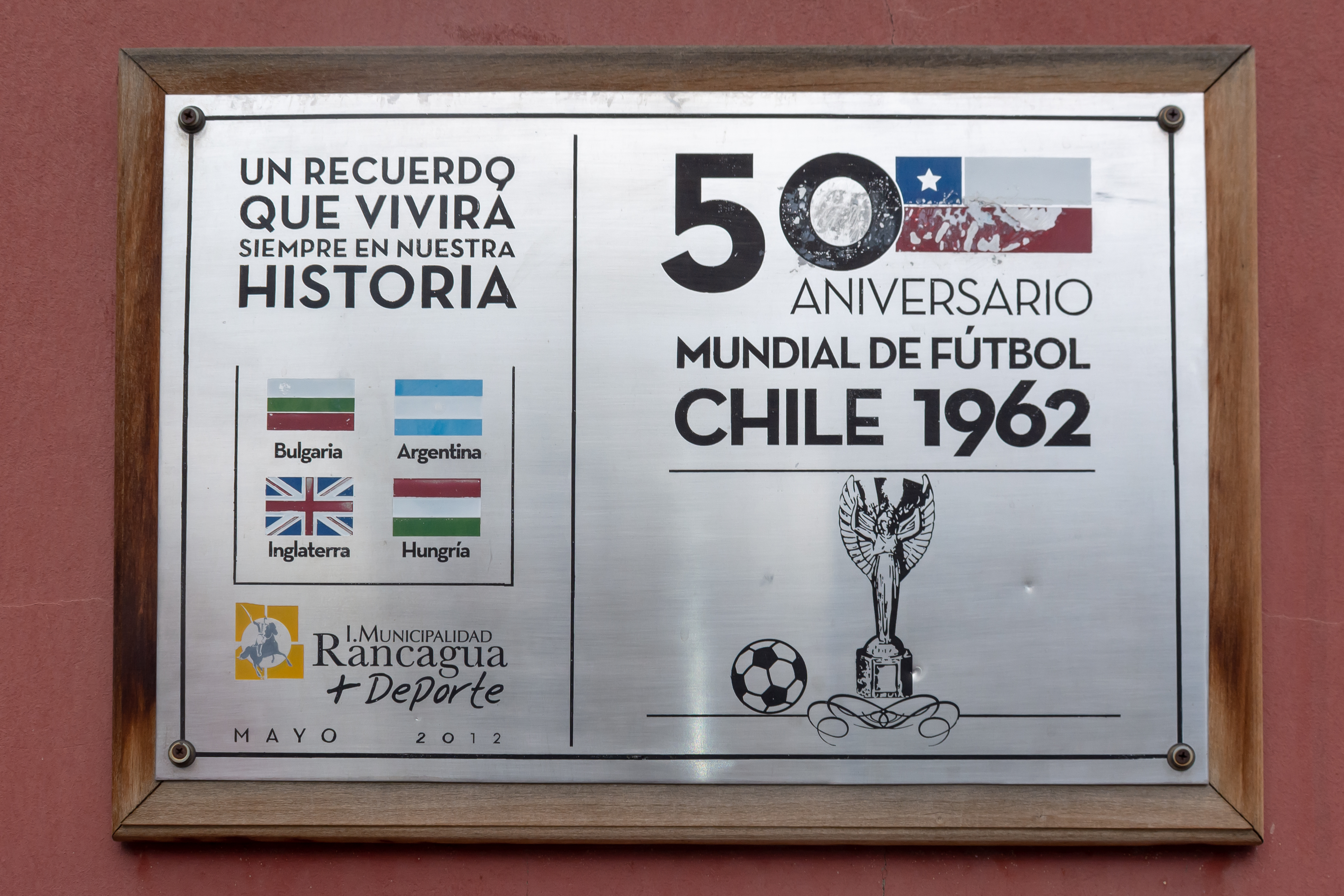
Commemorative plaque at the outside of the stadium.

The Estadio El Teniente hosted seven games during the 1962 FIFA World Cup, every game of Group 4 and a quarterfinal.

Teams which played in this stadium for the 1962 FIFA World Cup:

- Argentina
- Bulgaria
- Hungary
- England
- Czechoslovakia

=== Matches ===
==== Group 4 ====
30 May 1962
15:00 CLT (UTC-04)

Argentina	1–0	Bulgaria
Facundo 4'	Report

El Teniente, Rancagua
Attendance: 7,134
Referee: Juan Gardeazábal Garay (Spain)

31 May 1962
15:00 CLT (UTC-04)

Hungary	2–1	England
Tichy 17'; Albert 61'	Report	Flowers 60' (pen.)

El Teniente, Rancagua
Attendance: 7,938
Referee: Leo Horn (Netherlands)

2 June 1962
15:00 CLT (UTC-04)

England	3–1	Argentina
Flowers 17' (pen.); Charlton 42'; Greaves 67'	Report	Sanfilippo 81'

El Teniente, Rancagua
Attendance: 9,794
Referee: Nikolay Latyshev (Soviet Union)

3 June 1962
15:00 CLT (UTC-04)

Hungary	6–1	Bulgaria
Albert 1', 6', 53'; Tichy 8', 70'; Solymosi 12'	Report	Sokolov 64'

El Teniente, Rancagua
Attendance: 7,442
Referee: Juan Gardeazábal Garay (Spain)

6 June 1962
15:00 CLT (UTC-04)

Hungary	0–0	Argentina
	Report

El Teniente, Rancagua
Attendance: 7,945
Referee: Arturo Yamasaki Maldonado (Peru)

7 June 1962
15:00 CLT (UTC-04)

England	0–0	Bulgaria
	Report

Estadio El Teniente, Rancagua
Attendance: 5,700
Referee: Antoine Blavier (Belgium)

==== Quarter-finals ====
10 June 1962
14:30 CLT (UTC-04)

Czechoslovakia	1–0	Hungary
Scherer 13'	Report

El Teniente, Rancagua
Attendance: 11,690
Referee: Nikolay Latyshev (Soviet Union)

== Chile national football team matches ==
=== Men's ===
The Estadio El Teniente has hosted six games of the Chile national football team, including friendlies in FIFA Week and pre-2015 Copa América.

24 April 2006
21:30 CLT (UTC-04)

Chile	4–1	New Zealand
Suazo 36'; Christie 39' (o.g.); Roco 61'; Rubio 67'	Report	Smeltz 14'

El Teniente, Rancagua
Attendance: 8,000
Referee: Jorge Osorio (Chile)

4 June 2008
19:00 CLT (UTC-04)

Chile	2–0	Guatemala
Sánchez 1', 35'	Report

El Teniente, Rancagua
Attendance: 6,000
Referee: Antonio Arias (Paraguay)

28 January 2015
20:00 CLT (UTC-04)

Chile	3–2	United States
R. Gutiérrez 10'; Mark González 66', 75'	Report	Shea 6'; Altidore 31'

El Teniente, Rancagua
Attendance: 12,420
Referee: Patricio Loustau (Argentina)

5 June 2015
19:00 CLT (UTC-04)

Chile	1–0	El Salvador
Valdivia 14'	Report

El Teniente, Rancagua
Attendance: 12,500
Referee: Fernando Rapallini (Argentina)

16 November 2018
21:15 CLT (UTC-03)

Chile	2–3	Costa Rica
Vegas 70'; Sánchez 90'	Report	Waston 36', 59'; Matarrita 31'

El Teniente, Rancagua
Attendance: 9,758
Referee: Germán Delfino (Argentina)

26 March 2021
22:00 CLT (UTC-03)

Chile	2–1	Bolivia
Jiménez 12'; Meneses 20'	Report	Moreno Martins 18'

El Teniente, Rancagua
Attendance: 0 (COVID-19)
Referee: Juan Gabriel Benítez (Paraguay)

=== Women's ===
The Estadio El Teniente has hosted three games of the Chile women's national football team, all of them being international friendlies.

9 June 2018
19:00 CLT (UTC-04)

Chile	4–0	Costa Rica
López 10'; Benavides 53' (o.g.); Lara 70'; Aedo 82'	Report

El Teniente, Rancagua
Attendance: 3,473
Referee: María Carvajal (Chile)

8 October 2019
18:30 CLT (UTC-03)

Chile	3–1	Uruguay
Aedo 54' (pen.); Lara 73'; Kadzban 90+2'	Report	Carballo 44'

El Teniente, Rancagua
Attendance: 7,677
Referee: Montserrat Maturana (Chile)

28 June 2022
18:30 CLT (UTC-04)

Chile	1–3	Venezuela
Lara 13'	Report	Altuve 33', 61', 81'

El Teniente, Rancagua
Attendance: 5,000
Referee: Charly Deretti (Brazil)

== 2015 Copa América ==
The fixture schedule was announced on 11 November 2014, and two games were played in the Estadio El Teniente for the 2015 Copa América, playing here 4 of 12 countries of the tournament. Both matches were part of the group stage.

Teams which played in this stadium for the 2015 Copa América:

- Colombia
- Venezuela
- Mexico
- Ecuador

=== Group stage ===
14 June 2015
16:00 CLT (UTC-04)
Group C

Colombia	0–1	Venezuela
	Report	Rondón 60'

El Teniente, Rancagua
Attendance: 12,387
Referee: Andrés Cunha (Uruguay)

19 June 2015
18:00 CLT (UTC-04)
Group A

Mexico	1–2	Ecuador
Jiménez 63' (pen.)	Report	Bolaños 25'; Valencia 57'

El Teniente, Rancagua
Attendance: 11,051
Referee: José Argote (Venezuela)

== 2025 FIFA U-20 World Cup ==
The draw took place at Chilevisión's Machasa studios in Santiago on 29 May 2025.

Teams which played in this stadium for the 2025 FIFA U-20 World Cup:

- France
- South Africa
- New Caledonia
- United States
- Saudi Arabia
- Norway
- Italy
- South Korea
- Morocco

=== Group stage ===
29 September 2025
17:00

France	2–1	South Africa
Bermont 25'; Michal 80'	Report	Ah Shene 33' (pen.)

Estadio El Teniente, Rancagua
Attendance: 6,499
Referee: João Pinheiro (Portugal)
29 September 2025
20:00

United States	9–1	New Caledonia
Cremaschi 2', 4', 37'; Tsakiris 7'; Westfield 28'; Norris 35', 44'; Habroune 68'; Campbell 73'	Report	Simane 70'

Estadio El Teniente, Rancagua
Attendance: 2,000
Referee: Omar Artan (Somalia)

2 October 2025
17:00

United States	3–0	France
Gozo 85'; Raines 88'; Zambrano 90+2'	Report

Estadio El Teniente, Rancagua
Attendance: 8,210
Referee: Gustavo Tejera (Uruguay)
2 October 2025
20:00

South Africa	5–0	New Caledonia
Nkwali 25'; April 34' (pen.); Magidigidi 44', 52'; Maku 80'	Report

Estadio El Teniente, Rancagua
Attendance: 1,500
Referee: Nazmi Nasaruddin (Malaysia)

5 October 2025
17:00

South Africa	2–1	United States
Wynder 17' (o.g.); Kekana 45+2'	Report	Cobb 12'

Estadio El Teniente, Rancagua
Attendance: 6,520
Referee: Darío Herrera (Argentina)
5 October 2025
20:00

Saudi Arabia	1–1	Norway
Haji 53' (pen.)	Report	Fuglestad 46'

Estadio El Teniente, Rancagua
Attendance: 1,200
Referee: Gustavo Tejera (Uruguay)

=== Round of 16 ===
9 October 2025
16:30

United States	3–0	Italy
Cremaschi 15', 90+3'; Tsakiris 79'	Report

Estadio El Teniente, Rancagua
Attendance: 6,598
Referee: Gustavo Tejera (Uruguay)

9 October 2025
20:00

Morocco	2–1	South Korea
Shin Min-ha 8' (o.g.); Zabiri 58'	Report	Kim Tae-won 90+6' (pen.)

Estadio El Teniente, Rancagua
Attendance: 8,375
Referee: Darío Herrera (Argentina)

=== Quarter-finals ===
12 October 2025
17:00

United States	1–3	Morocco
Campbell 45+6' (pen.)	Report	Zahouani 31'; Wynder 67' (o.g.); Yassine 87'

Estadio El Teniente, Rancagua
Attendance: 10,742
Referee: Kevin Ortega (Peru)

== 2025–26 CONMEBOL Liga de Naciones Femenina ==
=== Round robin ===
28 October 2025
18:00 UTC−3

Chile	5–0	Bolivia
Keefe 3' (pen.), 9'; Pinilla 17'; Jiménez 45+1'; López 46'	Report (FIFA)

Estadio El Teniente, Rancagua
Referee: Marcelly Zambrano (Ecuador)
2 December 2025
20:00 UTC−3

Chile	1–0	Paraguay
Aedo 33'	Report (FIFA); Report (CONMEBOL)

Estadio El Teniente, Rancagua
Referee: Milagros Arruela (Peru)

== Attendances ==
Season	Division	Average attendance	Highest attendance	Lowest attendance
2022	Campeonato Nacional	4,617	6,753 v Colo-Colo	2,761 v Palestino
2023	Campeonato Nacional	5,827	9,105 v Universidad de Chile	3,792 v Audax Italiano
2024	Campeonato Nacional	5,703	9,078 v Universidad de Chile	3,580 v Cobresal

== Transport connections ==
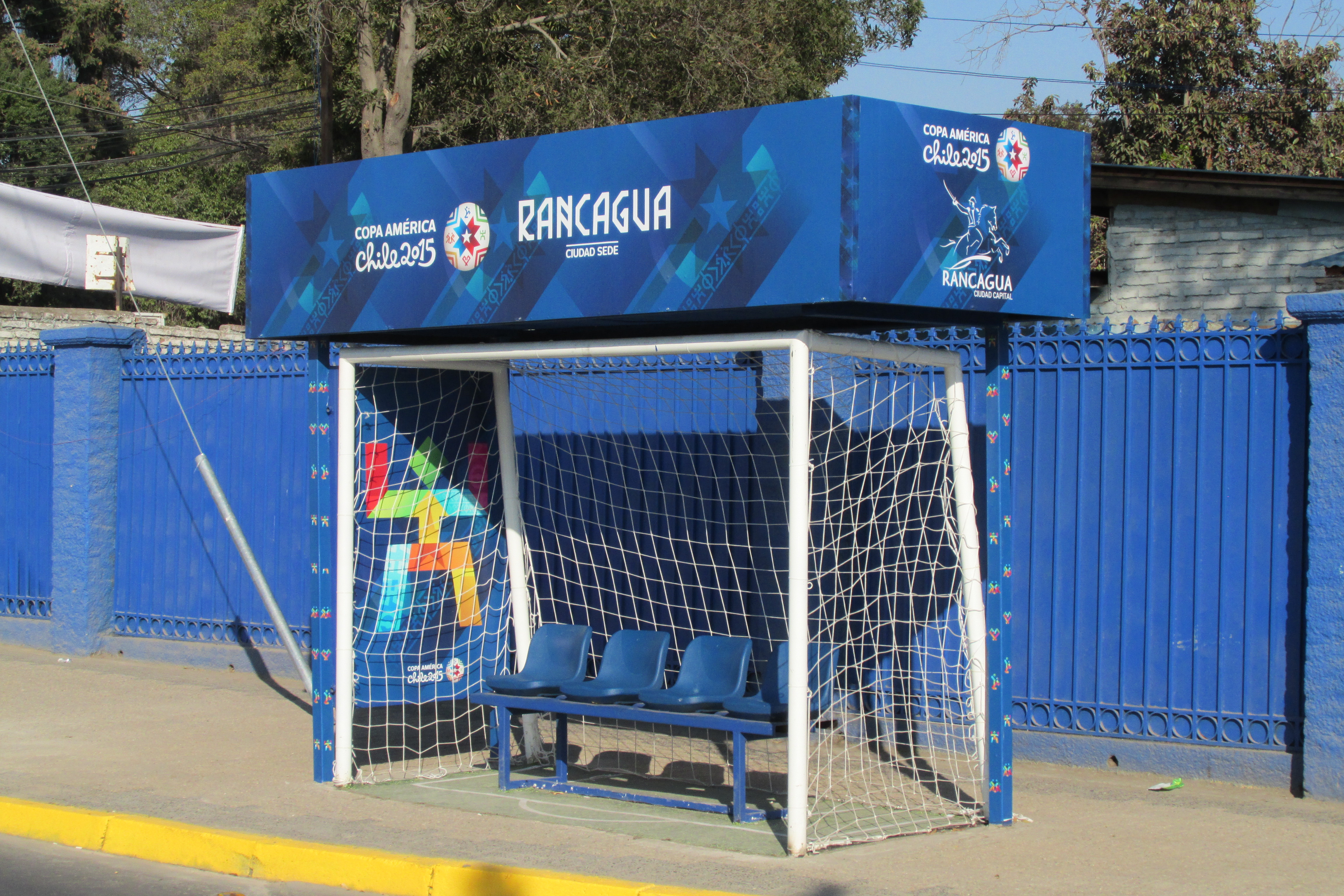
Public transport stop in the shape of a football goal, built for the 2015 Copa América, near to the stadium.

=== Bus ===
Terminal O'Higgins is the principal bus stop of the city receiving buses from the south and north of Chile, and the stadium is 1.05 miles (1.7 km) away following the Rancagua main avenues. The Tur Bus terminal at Rancagua is 1.55 miles (2.35 km) away of the stadium, being the most famous private bus stop in the city. Local buses (micros) served by Trans O'Higgins have many lines with a stop close to El Teniente are:

Trans O'Higgins lines:

Num.	Name	Routes
100	Expreso Rancagua/Circunvalación	101, 102 and 103
200	Isabel Riquelme	201, 202, 203
300	Cachapoal	301, 302, 303,304
400	Manzanal	403

=== Tramway ===
The stadium is 1.18 miles (1.9 km) away from the Estación Rancagua (Metrotrén).

=== Airport ===
The city only has the Aeródromo de la Independencia, but receives only the private jets and Chilean Army flights. The nearest international airport is the Arturo Merino Benítez International Airport, in Santiago, 86 km away from the city, but is the main airport of the country, receiving always delegations of national teams and professional clubs.

== Main events ==
The stadium has hosted major sporting events such as the 1962 FIFA World Cup and the 2015 Copa América. It has also hosted events such as the 2017 South American U-17 Championship and the 2019 South American U-20 Championship. However, its main focus is football, with concerts and cultural events being less frequent.

=== International sporting events ===
Event	Date
FIFA World Cup	1962
Copa América	2015
South American U-17 Championship	2017
South American U-20 Championship	2019
FIFA U-20 World Cup	2025
CONMEBOL Liga de Naciones Femenina	2025–26

=== Cultural and Healthy events ===
Event	Date
Commemorative parade of the Rancagua disaster	2 October (every year)
Tomé tragedy funeral	2013
COVID-19 Vaccine Center	2021
Expo Minería Sur	2024–

=== Musical concerts ===
Event	Date
(Chile) Los Prisioneros	28 March 2002
(Chile) Lucybell	5 November 2005
(Brazil) (Chile) Joe Vasconcellos	8 March 2006
(Mexico) (United States) Marcos Witt	15 November 2006
(Chile) La Sonora de Tommy Rey	9 February 2012
(Chile) Buddy Richard	10 February 2012
(Chile) Chancho en Piedra	11 February 2012
(Chile) Sinergia	23 December 2023

== Images ==
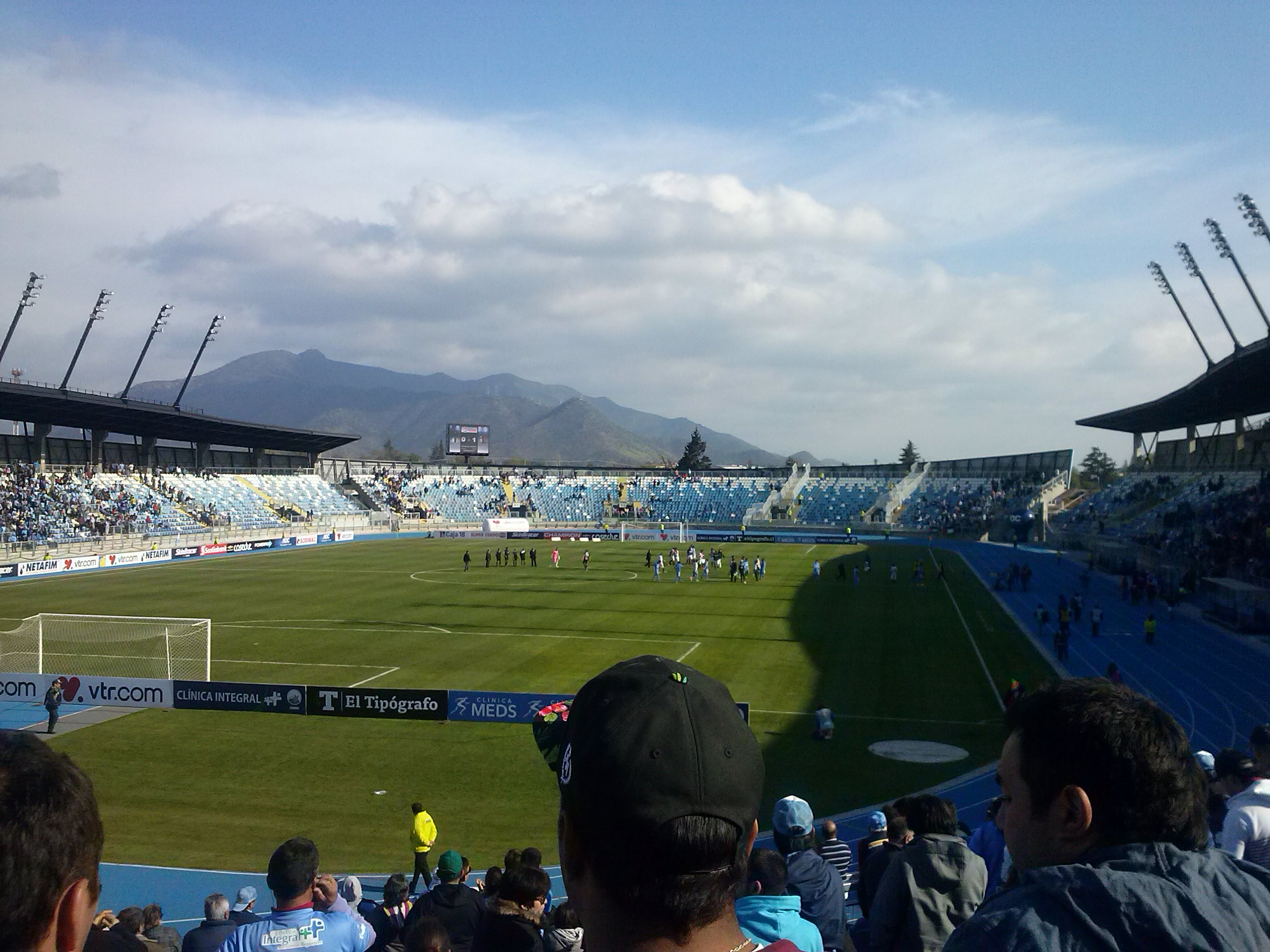
View from Angostura

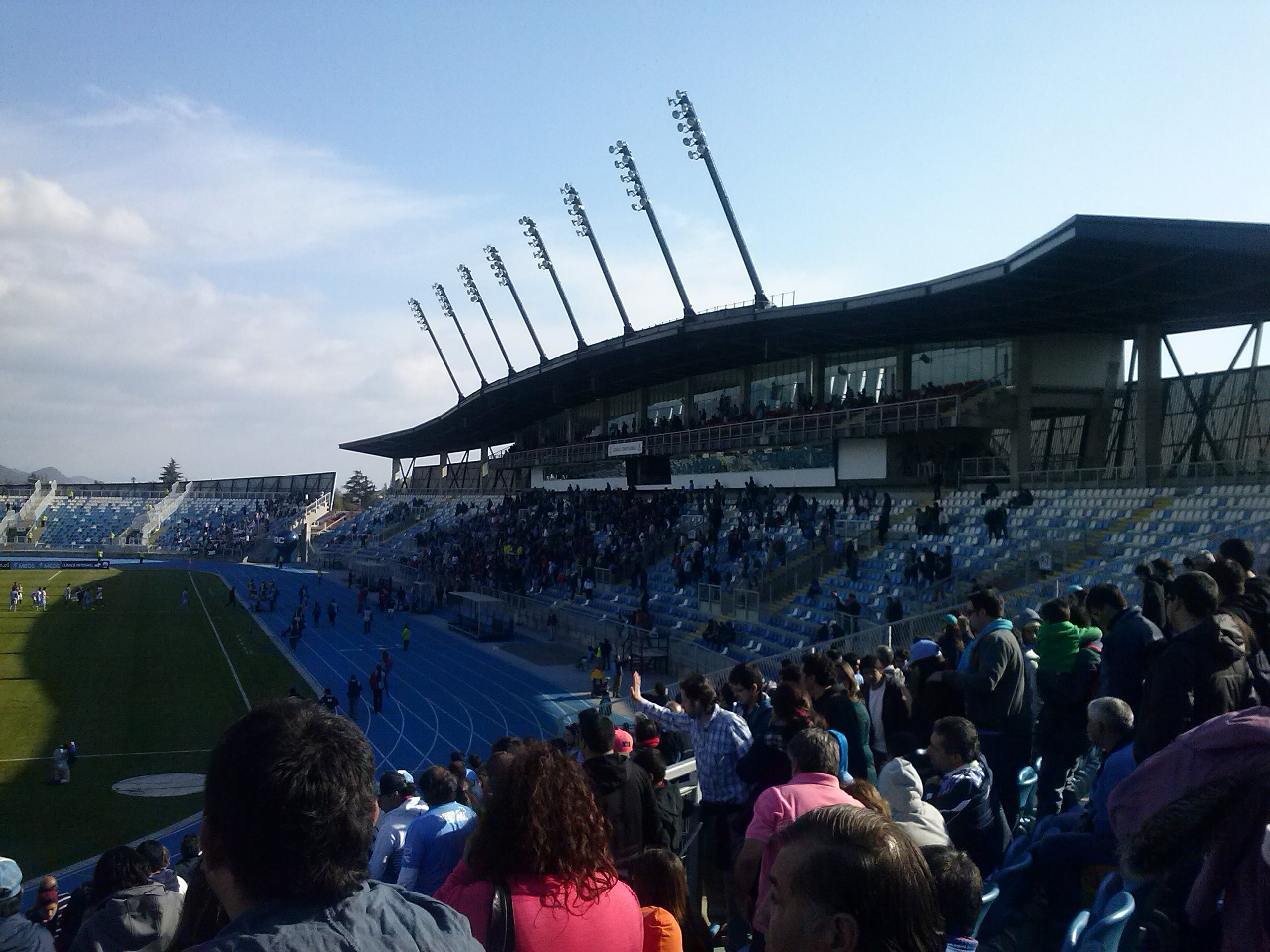
View of the Marquesina and VIP section

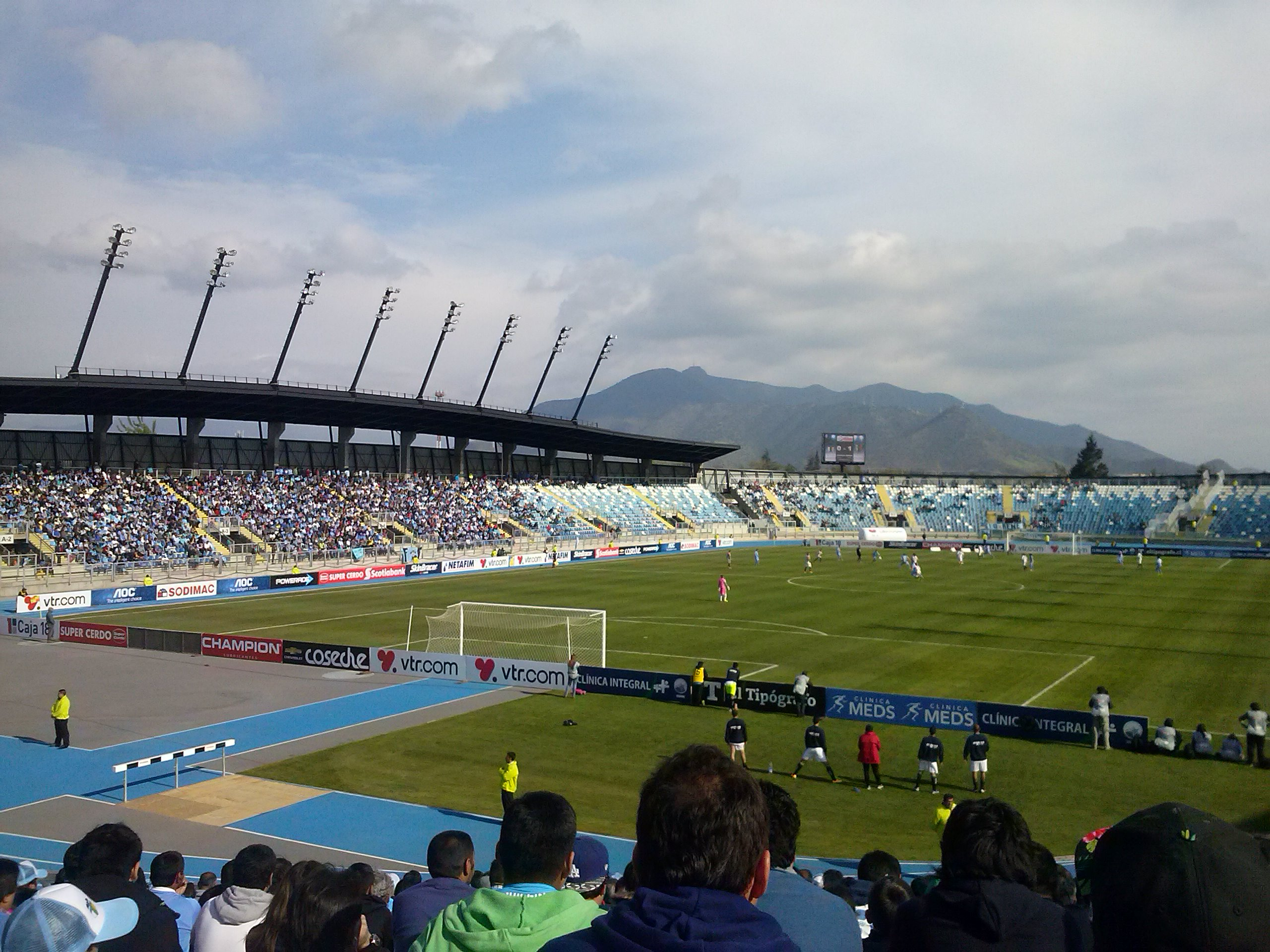
View from Angostura to Andes

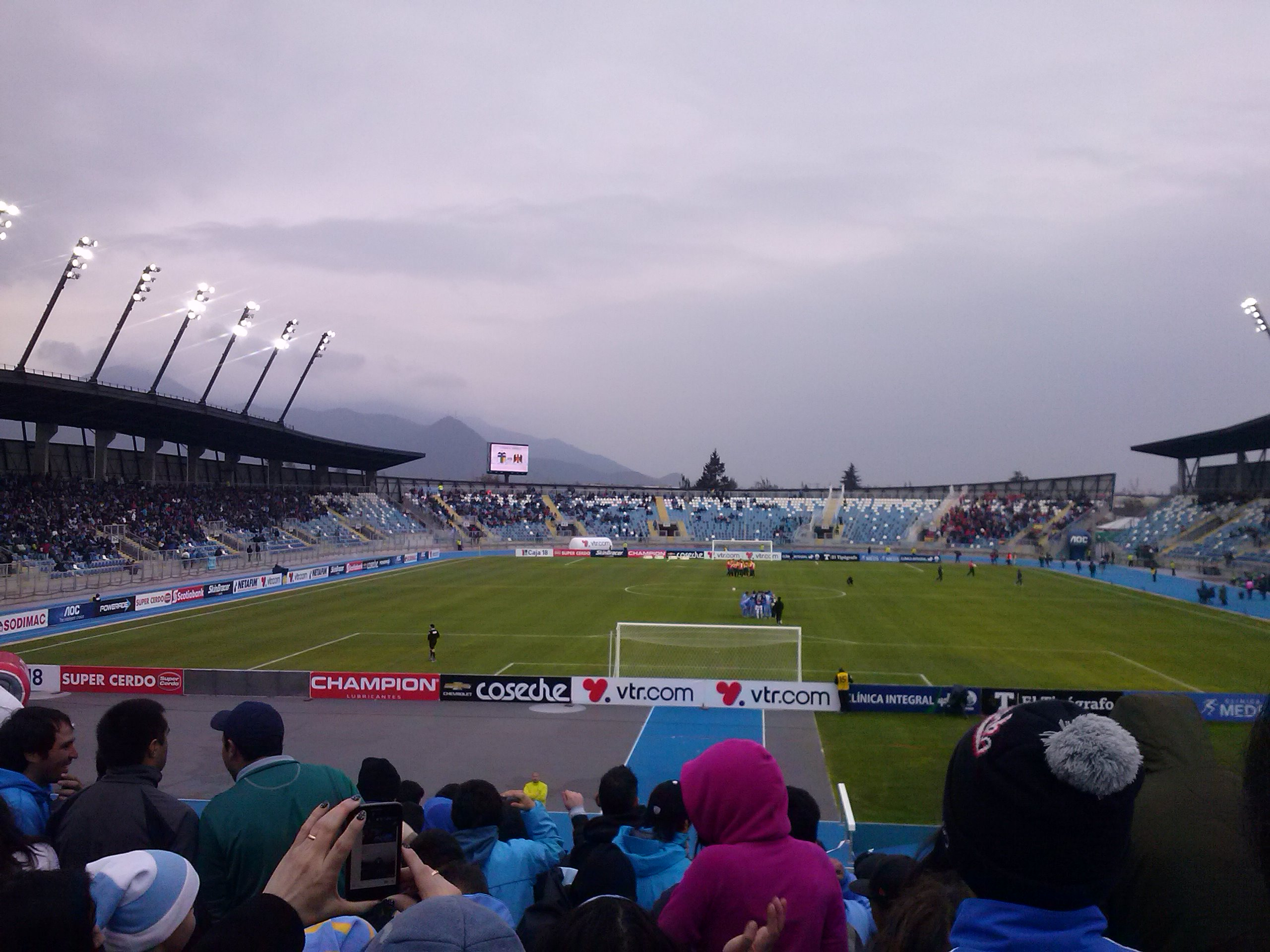
View from Angostura to Rengo

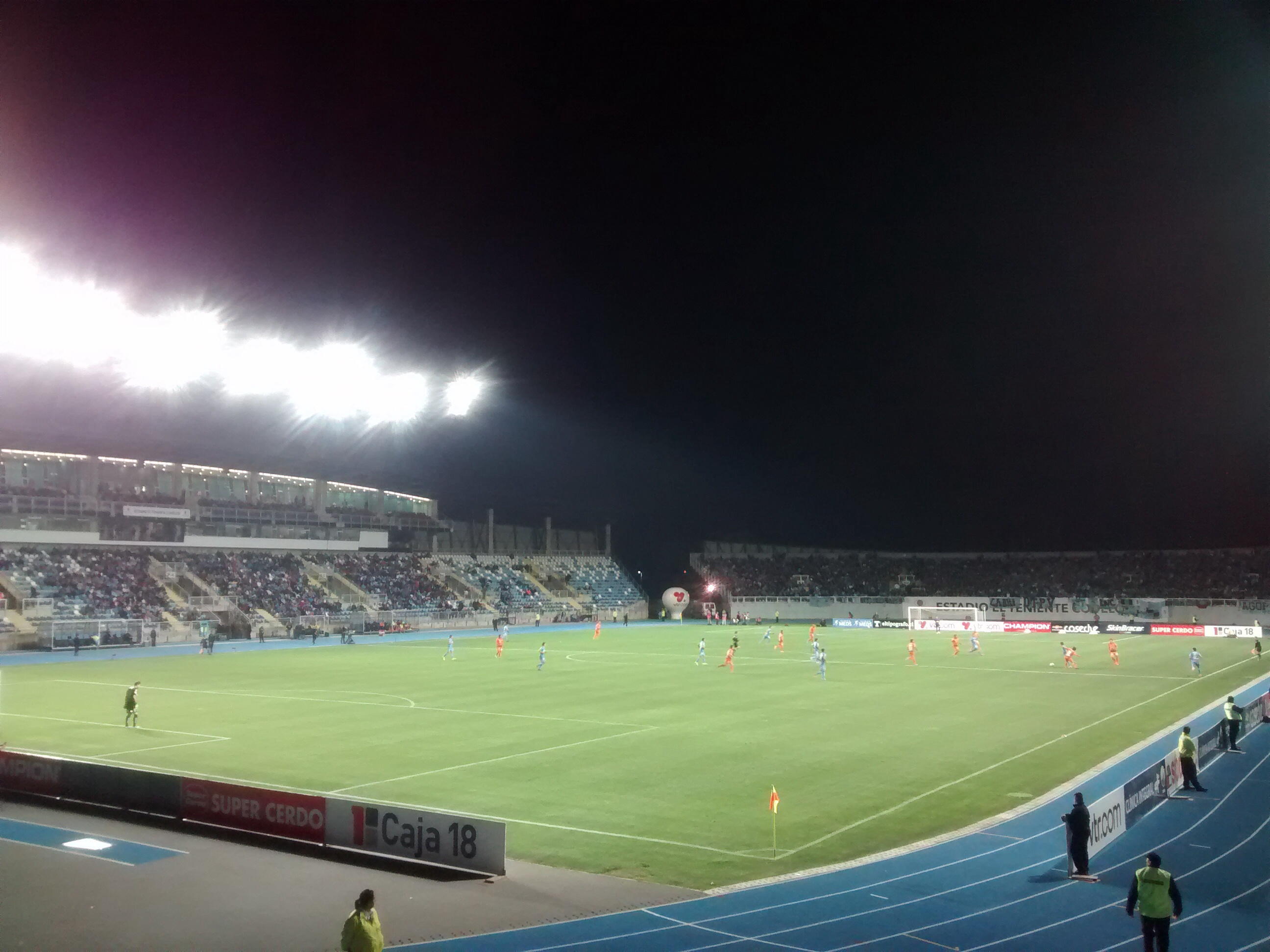
View from Rengo to Angostura and Marquesina

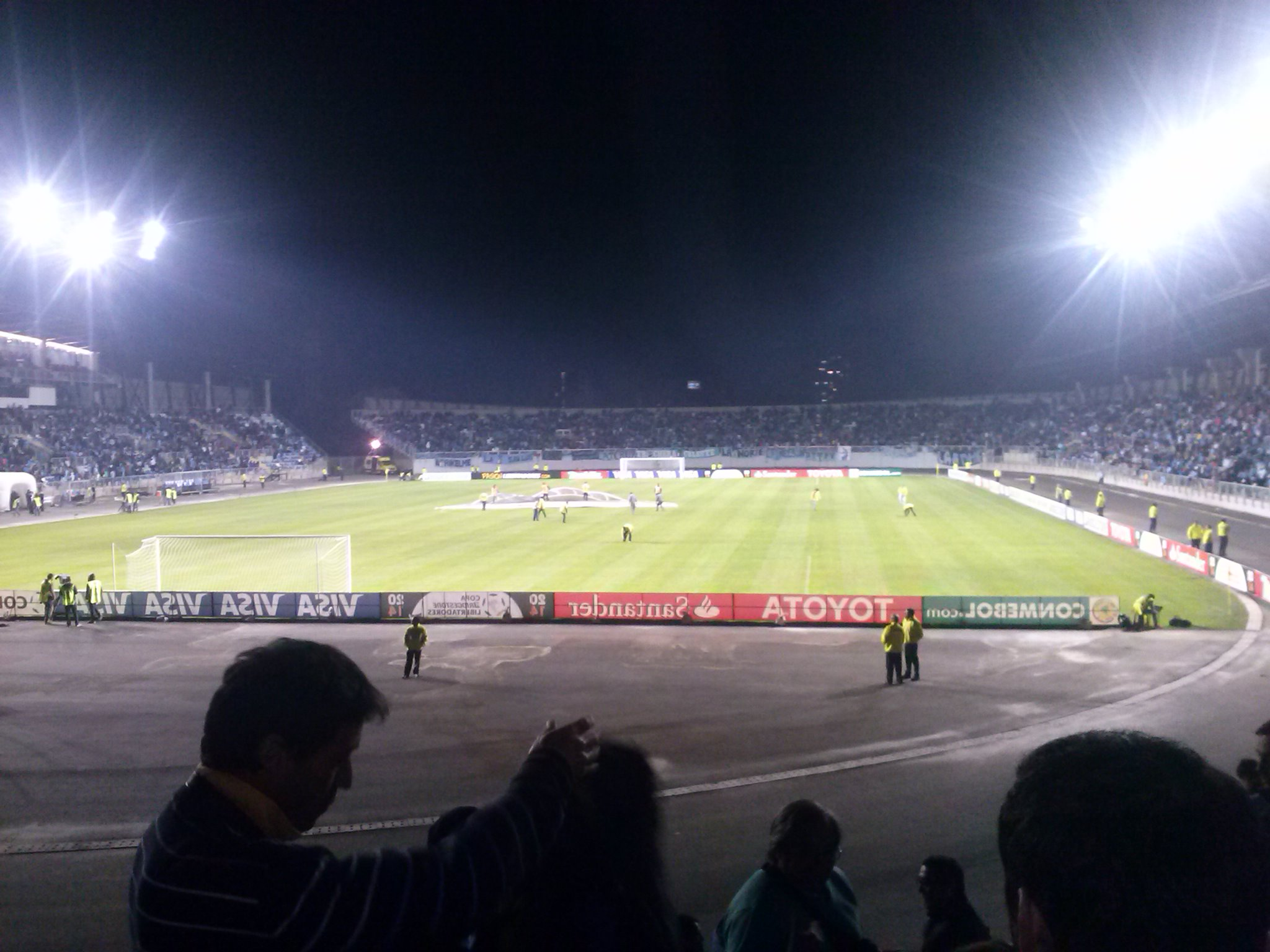
View from Rengo

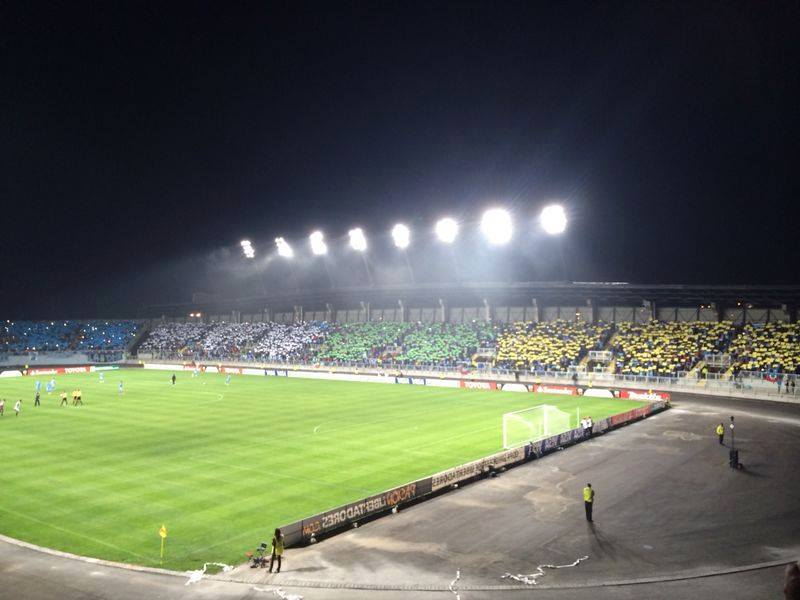
View from Marquesina to Andes
