= Trans O'Higgins =

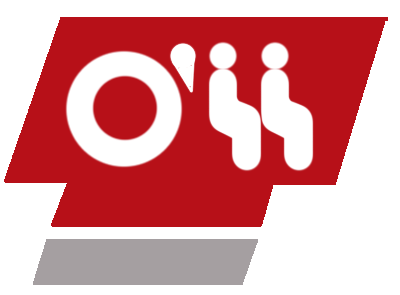
- Founded: 2004
- Locale: Rancagua, Chile
- Service area: Rancagua conurbation
- Service type: Public transport
- Routes: 19 bus lines

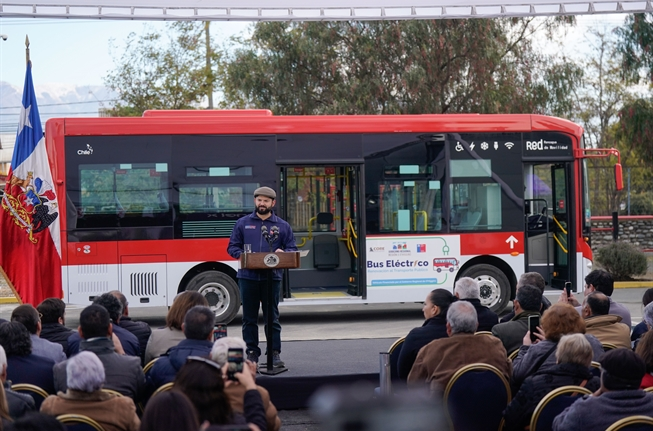
President Gabriel Boric Font leading the launch of electric buses in Rancagua for the Trans O'Higgins system

Trans O'Higgins is a public transport system that serves Rancagua, the capital of O'Higgins Region.

The system was introduced on October 25, 2004, having 19 lines on the Rancagua conurbation and surrounding areas.

== Details ==
The city transport comprise buses commonly called micros. The increased transport park consists mostly of medium capacity light microbuses.

Since the implementation of the transport plan Trans O'Higgins in 2004, it became a division of the types of transport: the red buses that are urban travel and green buses that are of rural type. The green buses are the mainstay of transport with the communes that make up the Rancagua conurbation.

=== Rancagua ===
In Rancagua are six bus lines that run through each one of the sectors of the city (Circunvalación, Isabel Riquelme, Cachapoal, Manzanal, Buses 25 and Oriente-Poniente). All these buses are colored red, and bus routes differ in the top of the windshield with different colors.

100	Circunvalación
200	Isabel Riquelme
300	Cachapoal
400	Manzanal
500	Buses 25
600	Oriente-Poniente

=== Surrounding areas ===
In rural areas near Rancagua are thirteen bus lines that run through each one of the sectors in the O'Higgins Region (San Francisco-Rancagua, Graneros-Rancagua, Oriente-Norte, Machalí-Rancagua, Coya-Rancagua, Vía Rural 5 Sur Quinta de Tilcoco, Vía Rural 5 Sur San Vicente de Tagua Tagua, Vía Rural 5 Sur San Fernando, Coinco-Rancagua, Olivar-Rancagua, Sextur - Lago Rapel, Las Cabras-Rancagua and Red Norte). All these buses are green, and bus routes differ in the top of the windshield with different colors. These buses start their trips from the Terminal Rodoviario located in the street Doctor José Antonio Salinas in Rancagua.

1000	San Francisco-Rancagua
2000	Graneros-Rancagua
3000	Oriente-Norte
4000	Machalí-Rancagua
5000	Coya-Rancagua
6000	Vía Rural 5 Sur Quinta de Tilcoco
7000	Vía Rural 5 Sur San Vicente de Tagua Tagua
8000	Vía Rural 5 Sur San Fernando
9000	Coinco-Rancagua
10000	Olivar-Rancagua
11000	Sextur - Lago Rapel
12000	Las Cabras-Rancagua
13000	Oriente-Poniente
