= Estadio Municipal de Rancagua =

Multi-purpose stadium in Rancagua, Chile

- Interactive map of Estadio Municipal de Rancagua
- Full name: Estadio Municipal de Rancagua; Estadio Municipal Patricio Mekis
- Location: Rancagua, Chile
- Coordinates: 34.155321°S 70.748199°W
- Owner: City of Rancagua
- Operator: City of Rancagua
- Capacity: 1,000
- Surface: Natural grass

Tenant
- Rancagua

Estadio Municipal de Rancagua, also known as Estadio Municipal Patricio Mekis, is a multi-purpose stadium in Rancagua, Chile. The stadium hosted three matches of the Rancagua between O'Higgins and Enfoque.

== Rancagua derby ==
=== Matches ===
Competition	Stadium	Home	Away	Date	Result
2011 Copa Chile	Estadio Municipal de Rancagua	Enfoque	O'Higgins	10 July 2011	0–3
2011 Copa Chile	Estadio Municipal de Rancagua	O'Higgins	Enfoque	13 July 2011	2–2
Friendly match	Estadio Municipal de Rancagua	Enfoque	O'Higgins	18 April 2013	1–3
