= Sagrario Cathedral =

Cathedral in Rancagua, Chile

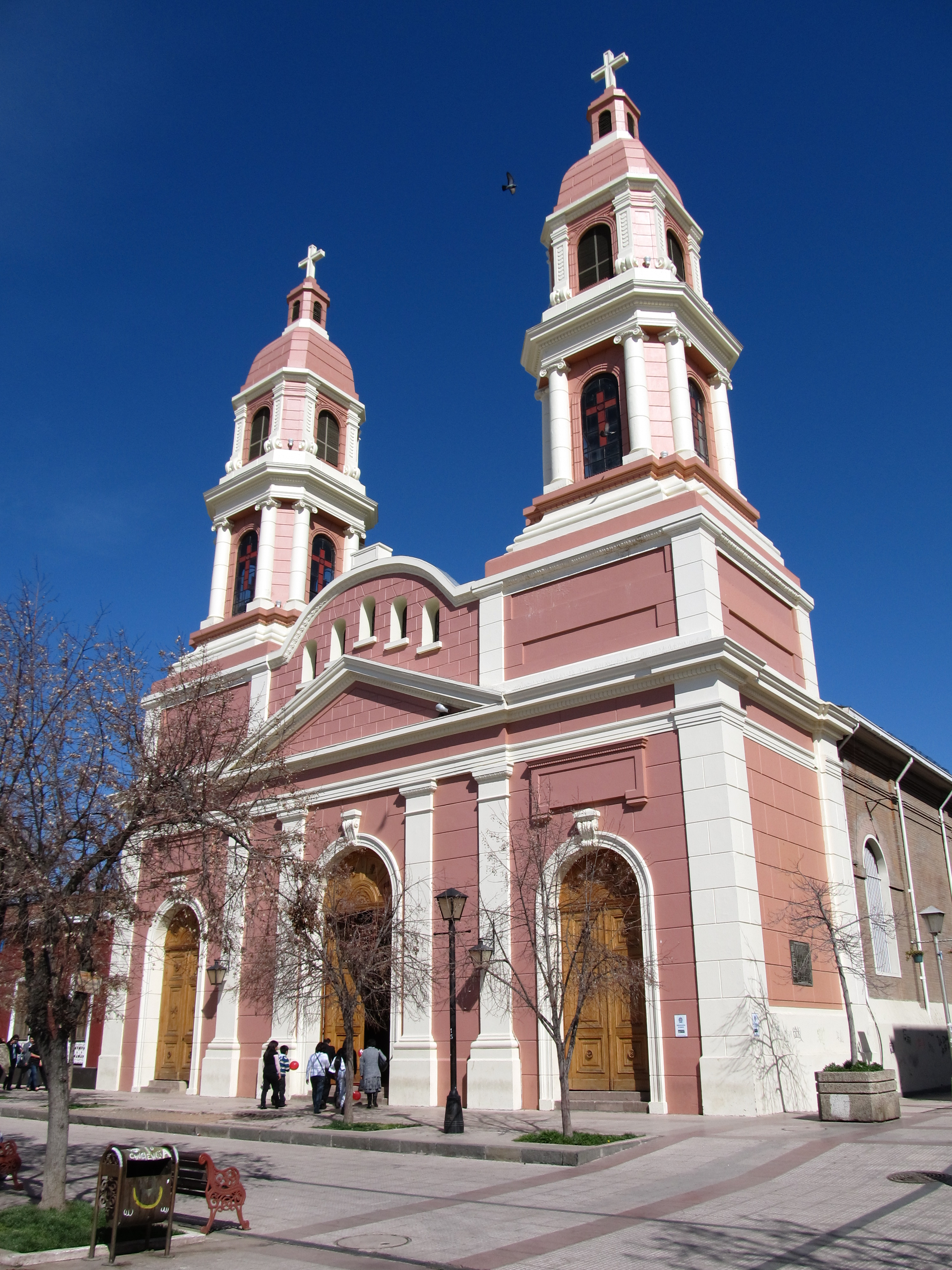
Catedral El Sagrario in 2011.

The Sagrario Cathedral (in Spanish: Catedral El Sagrario), also known as Rancagua Cathedral, is a Catholic church located in Rancagua, Chile. It has been declared historic preservation building (in Spanish: Inmueble de Conservación Histórica).

The first temple was built in 1550, by the initiative of the Bishop of Santiago de Chile, Diego de Medellín. It was damaged by the Battle of Rancagua in 1814.

The current cathedral was designed by French architect Juan Herbage in 1861, and it was finished in 1876. The temple was damaged in the 2010 Chile earthquake, and it was closed for reparations until April 21, 2011.
