= Rancagua =

City and commune in O'Higgins Region, Chile

- City and Commune
- Ciudad de Rancagua
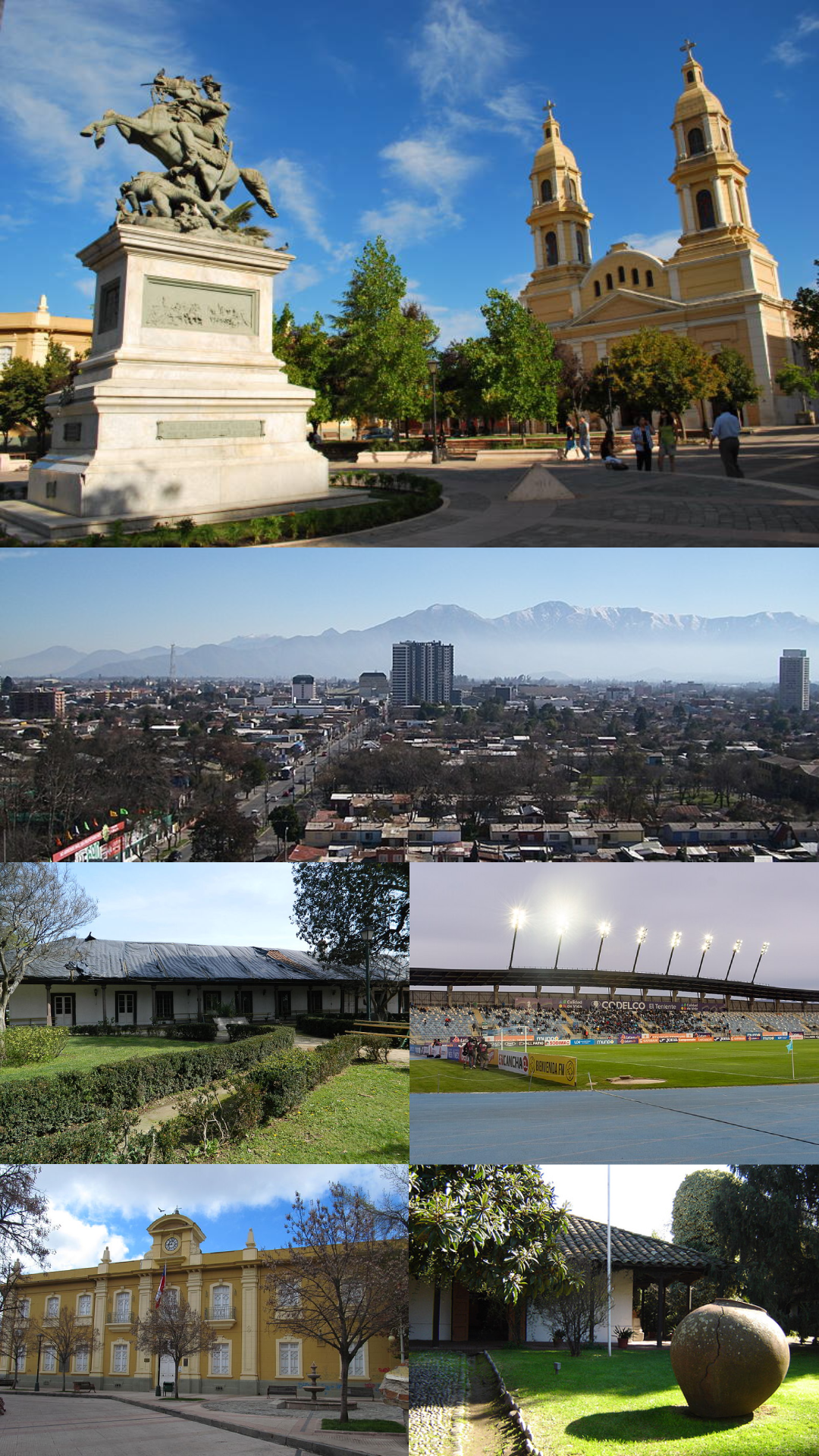
- From top to bottom and left-right: The monument to Bernardo O'Higgins (left) and the Sagrario Cathedral (right) in the Plaza de los Héroes, view towards the city center from Membrillar street, the Casa patronal del ex fundo El Puente, the Estadio El Teniente, the Provincial Government of Cachapoal, the Rancagua Regional Museum.

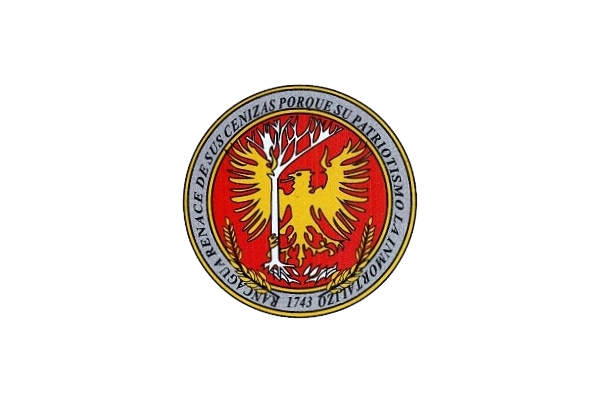
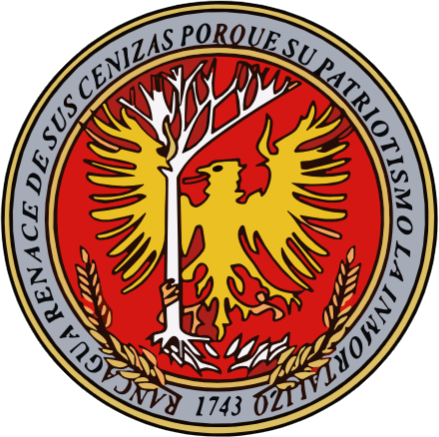
- Flag Coat of arms Brandmark Map of Rancagua commune in O'Higgins Region Location in Chile
- Coordinates (city): 34°10′S 70°45′W
- Country: Chile
- Region: O'Higgins Region
- Province: Cachapoal Province
- Foundation: October 5, 1743

Government
  - Type: Municipality
  - Alcalde: Raimundo Agliati

Area
  - Total: 260.3 km^{2} (100.5 sq mi)
- Elevation: 572 m (1,877 ft)

Population (2012 Census)
  - Total: 232,211
  - Density: 892.1/km^{2} (2,311/sq mi)
  - Urban: 206,971
  - Rural: 7,373
- Demonym: rancagüino (male) / rancagüina (female)

Sex
  - Men: 104,879
  - Women: 109,465
- Time zone: UTC−4 (CLT)
  - Summer (DST): UTC−3 (CLST)
- Postal code: 2820000
- Area code: 56 (country) + 72 (city)
- Police: Carabineros de Chile
- International airports: Rancagua de la Independencia
- Climate: Csb
- Website: www.rancagua.cl (in Spanish)

Rancagua (Spanish pronunciation: [raŋˈkaɣwa], abbreviated as Rgua) is a city and commune in central Chile and part of the Rancagua conurbation. It is the capital of the Cachapoal Province and of the O'Higgins Region, located 87 km (54 mi) south of the national capital of Santiago.

It was originally named Santa Cruz de Triana by Spanish colonists. The 2024 Chilean census recorded 257,744 inhabitants in the commune of Rancagua. The main economic activities range from mining, tourism, agriculture, timber, food production and services to minor industrial activities. The city also serves as the administrative and legal center of the region.

Together with Machalí and Gultro, it forms the Rancagua conurbation. After Curicó, Talca and Concepción, it is one of the most important and densely populated cities of the south central zone of Chile.

== History ==
=== Foundation period ===
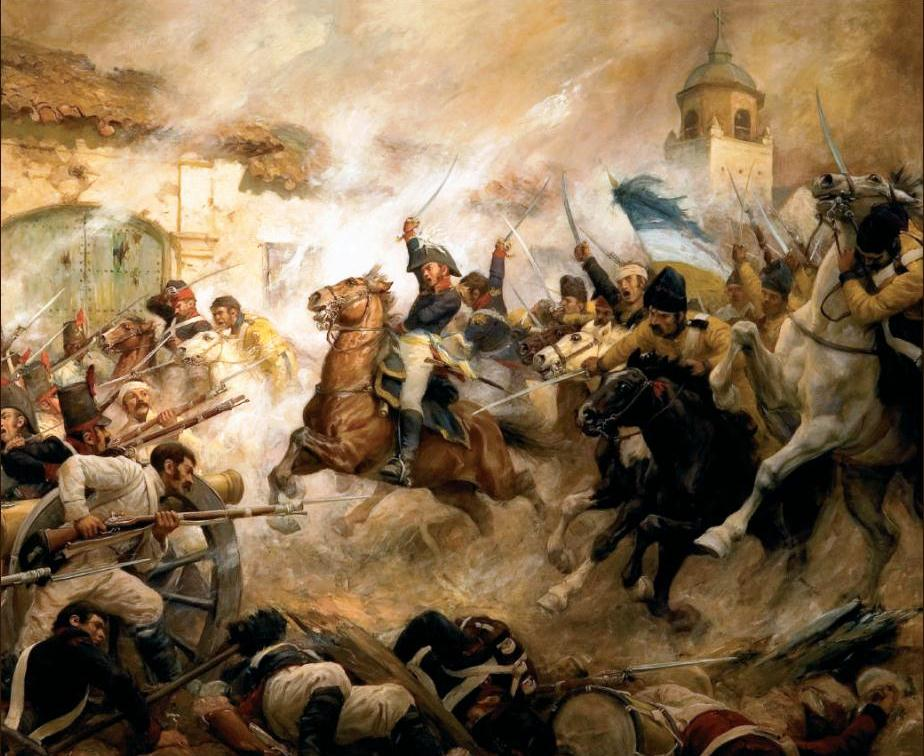
The Battle of Rancagua during the Chilean War of Independence, by Pedro Subercaseaux.

The Rancagua Valley was occupied by the local Picunche. They fell briefly under the control of the Inca Empire in the 15th century. Its remains in structures can still be found near the city today. Through their civil engineering, the Inca accomplished expeditions to the south of their empire.

Rancagua was founded by Spanish explorer José Antonio Manso de Velasco, who founded several cities in the central area of Chile. The settlement was first called Villa Santa Cruz de Triana.

The city is notable in Chilean history as the scene of the Disaster of Rancagua of 1814, when Chilean forces fighting for independence from Spain were defeated. This marked the beginning of the period known as the Reconquista (Reconquest), an attempt by Spain to regain control of Chile.

=== Today ===
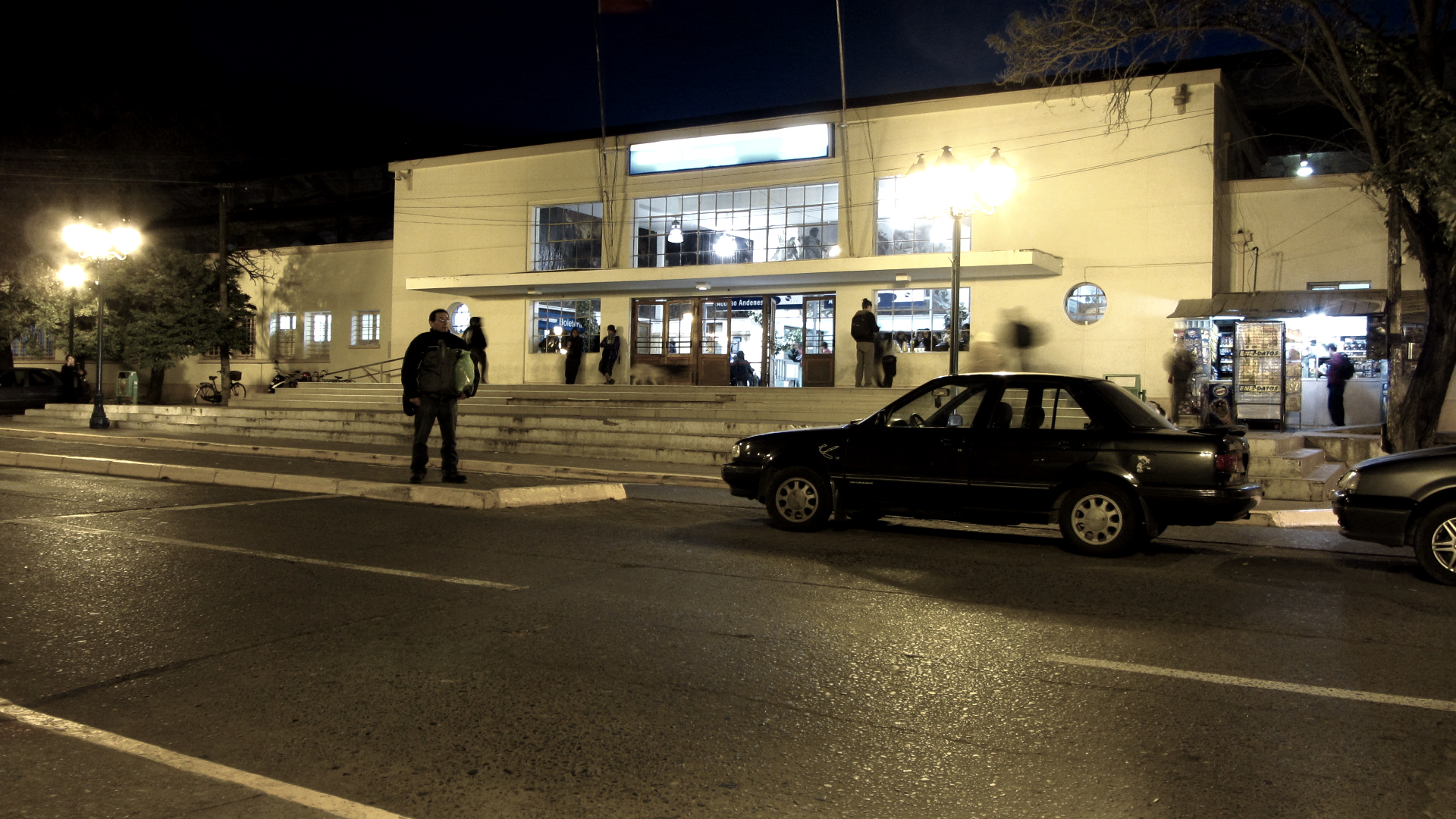
Rancagua train station.

In recent years the city has become one of the most attractive cultural and tourist centers in the O'Higgins Region, largely because of the vineyards that have been developed in the area. Rancagua also offers sports centers and easy access to smaller villages and towns.

Other visitors are attracted to the archeological sites, such as Pukara de La Compañia and the nearby Rio Cipreses nature reserve. Both can be visited by private vehicle or with local tour companies.

The city is connected to the capital, Santiago, by the Panamerican Highway (Chile Route 5). In addition, the Metrotren connects the metro service in Santiago to Rancagua by train.

Rancagua is home of the University of Rancagua (in Spanish), the first private university to be established in the O'Higgins Region.

The region is known for El Teniente in the nearby Andes mountain range: it is the "largest underground copper mine in the world." It is located about 40 km (25 mi) to the east of the city. El Teniente is a division of the state-owned mining enterprise, Codelco.

The city's Braden Copper Stadium, named for the American company that developed the mine through the first half of the 20th century, was one of the four venues of the 1962 FIFA World Cup. More recently, it houses the O'Higgins professional football (soccer) club, one of the leading teams in Chilean professional football. Every year, the National Championship of Chilean rodeo is held in the Medialuna Monumental de Rancagua. In 2015, the city hosted the 2015 Copa América, receiving two matches of the tournament.

== Demographics ==
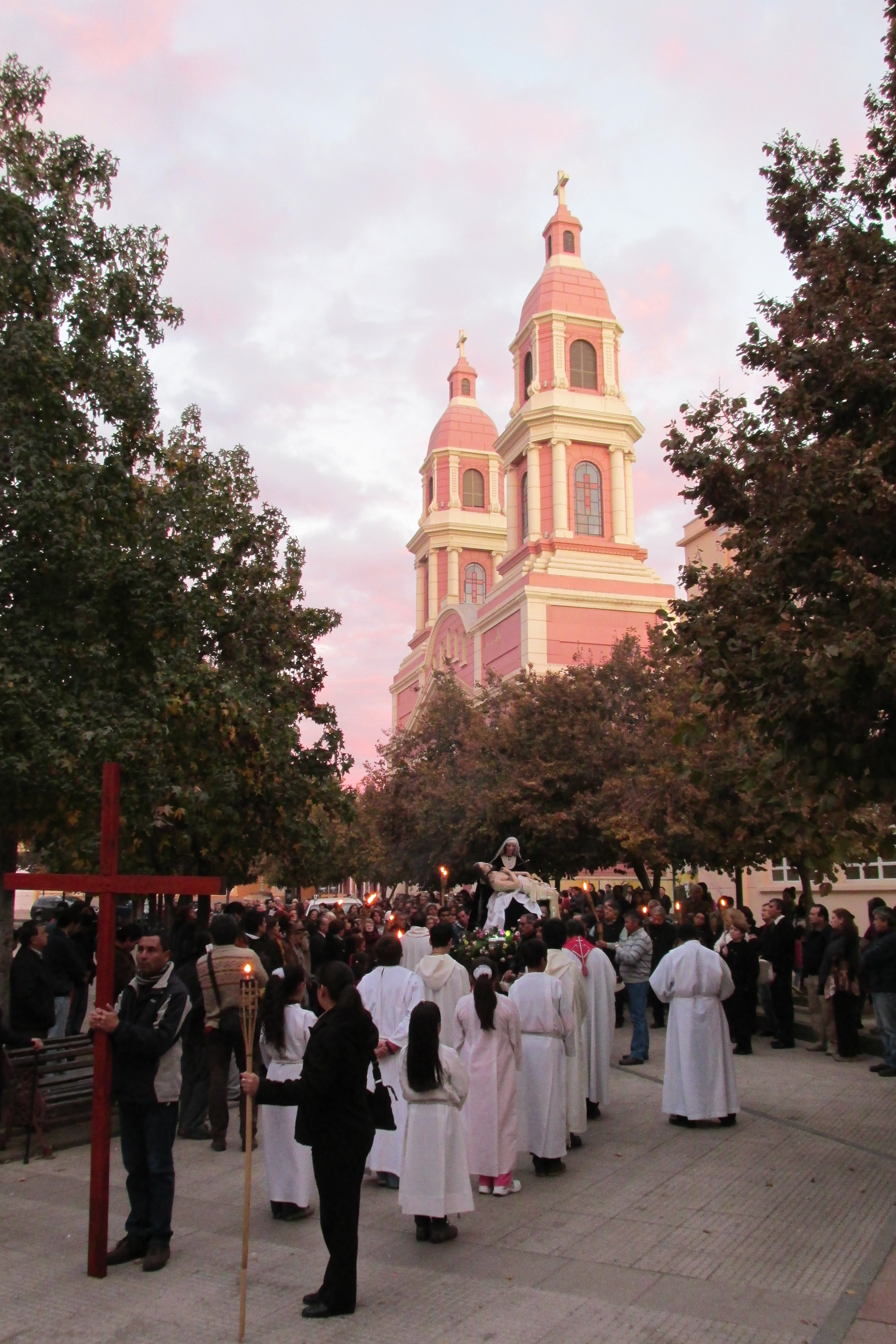
People of Rancagua in the Stations of the Cross ceremony.

The population of Rancagua is primarily either of Spanish descent or mestizo, with a particularly strong Basque influence. There are also residents of German, Croatian, Italian, Greek, Levantine Arab, Swiss, French, English or Irish ancestry living in the city. Indigenous Mapuche workers migrate from the south and there are also some Roma gypsies.

In addition, there has been increasing immigration to the city from neighbouring South American countries such as Bolivia, Colombia and Peru. According to the 2002 census of the National Statistics Institute, Rancagua spans an area of 260.3 km^{2} (101 sq mi) and has 214,344 inhabitants (104,879 men and 109,465 women). Of these, 206,971 (96.6%) lived in urban areas and 7,373 (3.4%) in rural areas. The population grew by 14.4% (27,020 persons) between the 1992 and 2002 censuses.

== Notable people born in Rancagua ==
- Germán Riesco (1854–1916), President of Chile between 1901 and 1906.
- Lucho Gatica, bolero singer.
- Cristóbal González, footballer.
- José Victorino Lastarria (1817–1888), writer and politician.
- Oscar Castro (1910 –1947) writer and poet.
- Mariano Díaz, photographer, graphic designer, and writer.
- Clarence Acuña, ex-footballer.
- Bryan Rabello, footballer.
- Mario Núñez, ex-footballer.
- Francisco Javier Quintanilla, theologian
- Ximena Cristi, painter

== Administration ==
=== Municipality ===
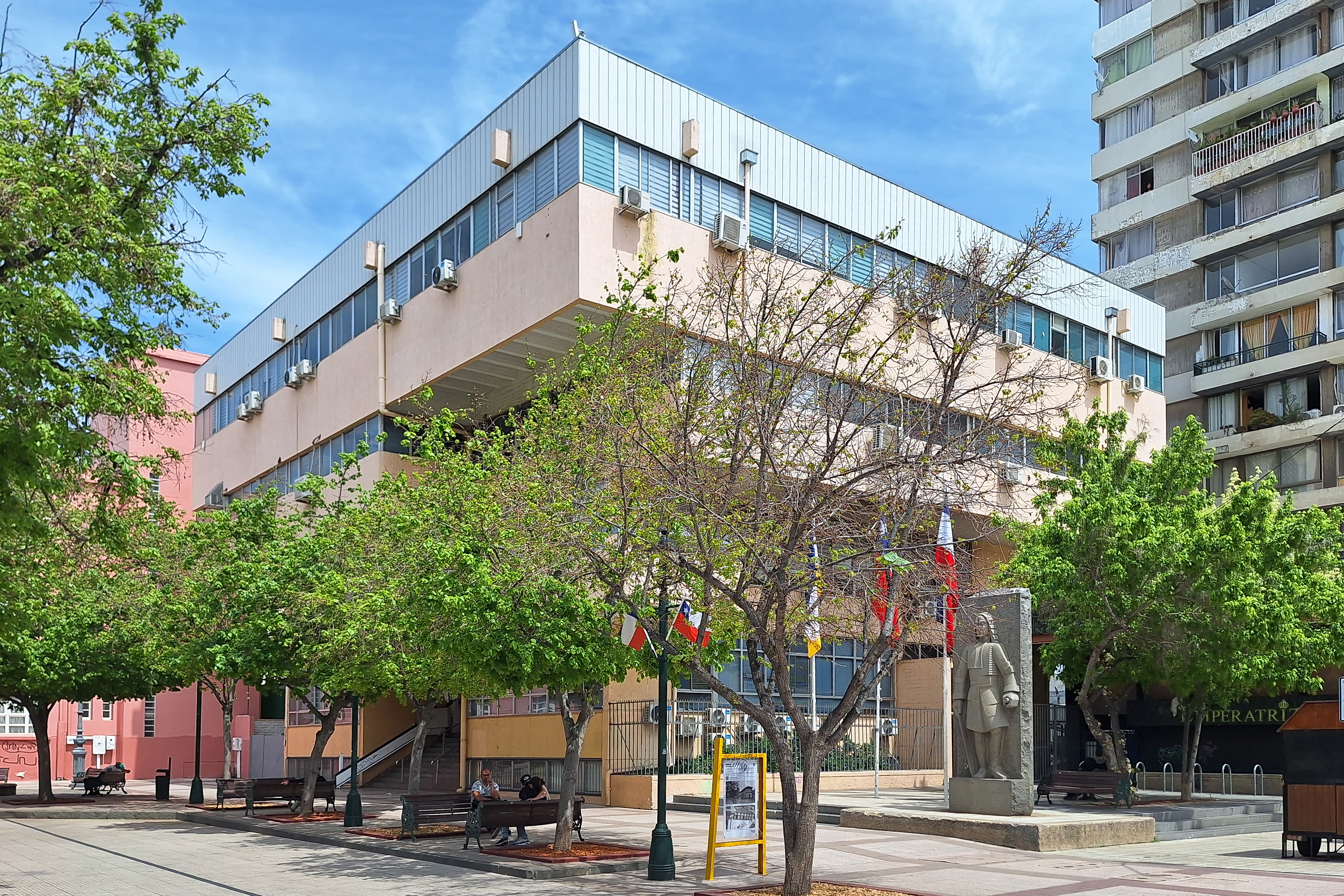
Building of the Municipality of Rancagua, located in Plaza de Los Héroes

The administration of the commune of Rancagua corresponds to the Illustrious Municipality of Rancagua, led for the 2024–2028 term by Mayor Raimundo Agliati Marchant (Ind./Chile Vamos), who is advised by the Municipal Council, composed of:

- Graciela Reinoso Jara (REP)
- María Sagredo Palacios (FA)
- Danilo Jorquera Vidal (PCCh)
- Arturo Jara Carrasco (Ind./UDI)
- Edwin Perrett Rojas (REP)
- María Orueta de Val (RN)
- Cristián Toledo Ponce (Ind./PR)
- Patricio Henríquez Henríquez (PS)
- Rómulo Burgos Pissani (Ind./AVP)
- Luis Guerra Pino (REP)

=== Parliamentary representation ===
Rancagua is one of the thirteen communes that make up District No. 15, in force since the LV legislative period of the National Congress of Chile (2018–2022), represented by five deputies. It also belongs to the 8th senatorial constituency, which since 2022 has been represented by three seats in the Senate.

In Congress, the commune is represented by senators Alejandra Sepúlveda (FRVS), Javier Macaya (UDI) and Juan Luis Castro (PS). It is also represented in the Chamber of Deputies by Raúl Soto (PPD), Diego Schalper (RN), Marcela Riquelme (FA), Natalia Romero (IND–UDI) and Marta González (IND–PPD).

It is the only commune in the Cachapoal I district of the Regional Council of O’Higgins. It is currently represented by regional councilors Pedro Hernández (UDI), Paula Muñoz (PDG), Germán Arenas (FA), Lennin Arroyo (IND–RN) and Mauricio Valderrama (PS).

== Economy ==
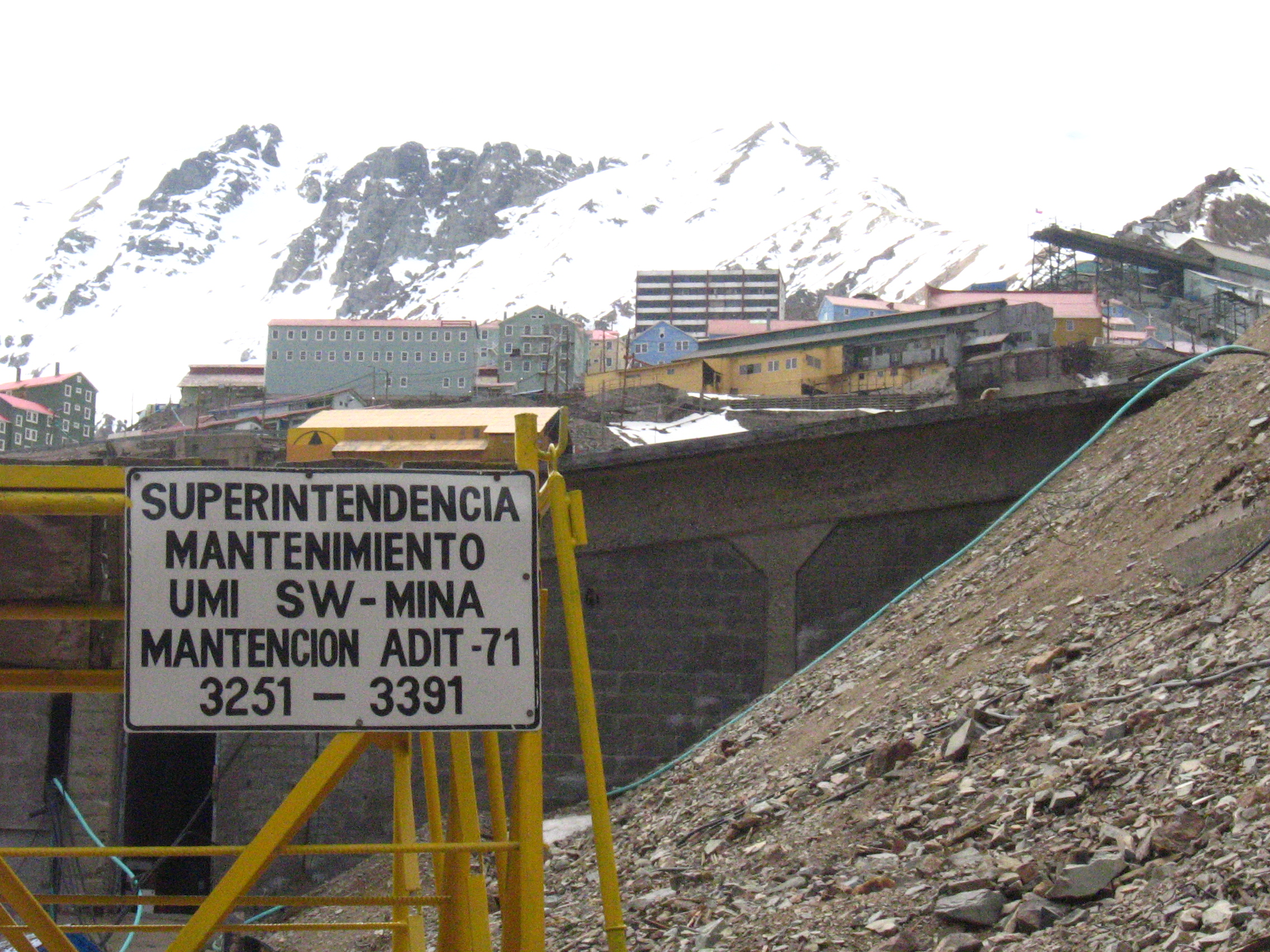
El Teniente Mine, the world's largest underground copper mine.

=== Primary sector ===
In the field of agriculture, Rancagua serves as a central hub where most of the region's agricultural products are gathered before being exported through the ports of San Antonio or Valparaíso.

In the Cachapoal Valley, the sharp climatic contrasts between the slopes of the Andes and the warmer plains of the central valley favor the production of generous red wines. Vines occupy around 80% of the planted area. The largest number of hectares are planted with Cabernet Sauvignon, followed by Merlot and Carménère. For white wines, Sauvignon Blanc and Chardonnay predominate.

About 50 minutes from the city, in the Andes Mountains, lies the El Teniente copper mine, currently operated by Codelco Chile. This deposit is an important source of employment for the inhabitants of the Rancagua conurbation. The Braden Copper Company, the mine's former owner, played a fundamental role in the city's development up to the 1960s, in both material and cultural aspects. There is also small-scale mining activity in the Chancón mining district, in the northwest area of the Rancagua commune.

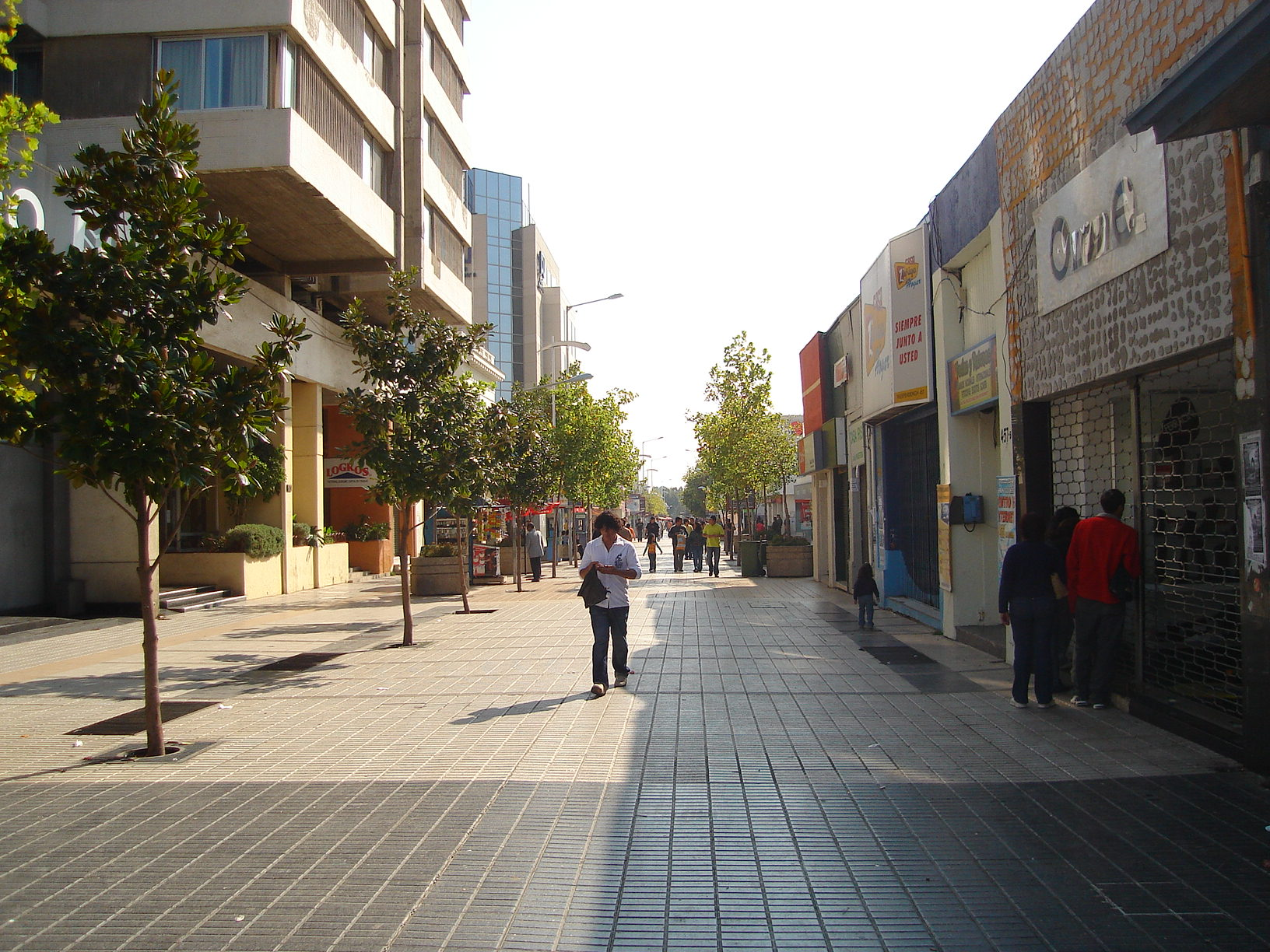
Paseo Independencia, one of Rancagua's main commercial avenues

=== Secondary and tertiary sectors ===
Since the late 1, Rancagua has developed a wide range of commercial activities. The main commercial hubs are the axis formed by Paseo Independencia and Brasil Street, and in recent years, Eduardo Frei Montalva Avenue — also known as the Carretera del Cobre (“Copper Highway”) — which leads to the El Teniente copper deposits. This major city thoroughfare has seen remarkable commercial growth since the late 1990s, with the construction of several shopping centers, hypermarkets, commercial premises, services, and medical institutions, which have significantly increased the real estate value of the city's eastern sector.

The city stands out nationally in the agro-food industry. It is also home to the automotive company Reborn Electric Motors, and the metallurgical company ME-Elecmetal. It features industrial parks along the Travesía Route and in the northern area of the city.

== International relations ==
The city of Rancagua hosts a number of institutions dedicated to international relations, such as the Regional Unit for International Affairs (URAI) of the O’Higgins Regional Government, responsible for analyzing and managing the region's bilateral and multilateral relations with entities in Latin America and the rest of the world; the Bi-oceanic Corridor and Internationalization Commission of the O’Higgins Regional Council; the Regional Office for Investment Promotion and Attraction; the regional office of the National Migration Service; the regional office of the General Directorate for Export Promotion (ProChile); the Department of Migration and International Police of the Investigations Police of Chile; and the Municipal Migration Office of Rancagua.

In matters of international relations and higher education, the main actor in Rancagua is the Directorate of Internationalization at the University of O’Higgins (UOH), responsible for student mobility and global cooperation. Furthermore, UOH has launched internationalization initiatives with a territorial focus, such as the Foreign Direct Investment Academy.

The Municipality of Rancagua has implemented internationalization initiatives such as the International University of Rancagua and, since 2002, has been a member of the Mercosur network of municipalities, Mercociudades.

=== Consulates ===
- Spain (Honorary Consulate)
- Syria (Honorary Consulate)
- Morocco (Honorary Consulate)

== Culture ==
This area is known as the "huaso province" after the name of the Chilean cowboy, the huaso. The population is a mixture of both European (including Argentine immigrants) and indigenous races and cultures. The region has a homogeneous culture known as Chileanidad and a mestizo influence is evident.

Rancagua and the Libertador General Bernardo O'Higgins Region was settled by Spaniards (notably Andalusian, Basque, Aragonese and Navarrese) and other Europeans. French and Italian families established agriculture, including the important wine industry: the Wine Route is one of the main tourist attractions of the Colchagua valley. Breweries can be found as well, the legacy of German and Swiss immigration. Livestock development and herding was especially influenced by British, Greek and Yugoslavian settlers.

Because the city is relatively close to Santiago, there has led to a growing urban influence in the local culture. Rancagua is fast becoming a suburb of Santiago's upper-class professional workforce.

=== Festivals ===
Anniversaries
Date	English name	Spanish name	Notes
1–2 October	Disaster of Rancagua	Desastre de Rancagua	In memory of the Battle of Rancagua which occurred in 1814

== Transportation ==
Meanwhile, all of the city is readily accessible by walking; Public Transport is provided by Trans O'Higgins by six lines of busses, and nine private taxi lines operate inside the urban radius.

== Mining - El Teniente ==
Situated 44 km east of Rancagua and 75 km south of the capital, Santiago, El Teniente claims to be the largest underground copper mine in the world (see below). The El Teniente orebody has been known and worked on a small scale for many years. In the 16th century it became the property of the Jesuits as it was located on their Hacienda de la Compañia de Jesús. They operated a small mine known as the Socavón de los Jesuitas. Following their expulsion, the hacienda was acquired in 1768 by Don Mateo de Toro y Zambrano y Ureta. Between 1819 and 1823 his heirs restarted and enlarged the workings, bringing in a mining engineer to help. However, these and subsequent attempts to establish anything more than a small scale mine failed for lack of capital and the property was eventually bought by the American, William Braden, for approximately US$100,000. The same year Braden formed Rancagua Mines, which became the Braden Copper Company, in association with old colleagues from ASARCO, including Barton Sewell.

Work started on establishing a mine in 1905 after Government permission had been acquired but progress was slow because of difficulty of access and a hard winter climate. A small gravity plant was soon erected but it was not until 1912 that a flotation plant was erected at Sewell. Control passed to Kennecott in 1915 and it ran the mine until nationalization in 1971.

== Climate ==
Rancagua has a Mediterranean climate (Köppen climate classification: Csb), with clearly marked seasons. Summers are generally extremely dry, with cool mornings and hot afternoons, while winters are mild with cold mornings and occasional periods of heavy rainfall that averages around 600 millimetres (24 in) each year – almost all of which occurs during a handful of storms between May and August. In some years there can be a little snow.

Climate data for Rengo
Month	Jan	Feb	Mar	Apr	May	Jun	Jul	Aug	Sep	Oct	Nov	Dec	Year
Mean daily maximum °C (°F)	29.8 (85.6)	28.8 (83.8)	26.2 (79.2)	22.1 (71.8)	18.8 (65.8)	14.0 (57.2)	13.8 (56.8)	14.2 (57.6)	18.4 (65.1)	21.7 (71.1)	24.0 (75.2)	28.3 (82.9)	21.7 (71.0)
Daily mean °C (°F)	21.4 (70.5)	20.2 (68.4)	17.0 (62.6)	13.6 (56.5)	10.5 (50.9)	7.6 (45.7)	7.9 (46.2)	8.5 (47.3)	11.3 (52.3)	14.4 (57.9)	16.7 (62.1)	20.1 (68.2)	14.1 (57.4)
Mean daily minimum °C (°F)	12.8 (55.0)	11.6 (52.9)	9.0 (48.2)	6.7 (44.1)	5.4 (41.7)	2.5 (36.5)	3.2 (37.8)	3.6 (38.5)	5.0 (41.0)	7.7 (45.9)	9.5 (49.1)	11.5 (52.7)	7.4 (45.3)
Average precipitation mm (inches)	5.4 (0.21)	9.3 (0.37)	9.2 (0.36)	16.6 (0.65)	98.7 (3.89)	157.6 (6.20)	118.2 (4.65)	100.4 (3.95)	38.9 (1.53)	24.3 (0.96)	18.7 (0.74)	3.4 (0.13)	600.7 (23.64)
Average relative humidity (%)	61	62	70	76	84	85	84	84	77	74	69	60	74
Source: Bioclimatografia de Chile

== Sports ==
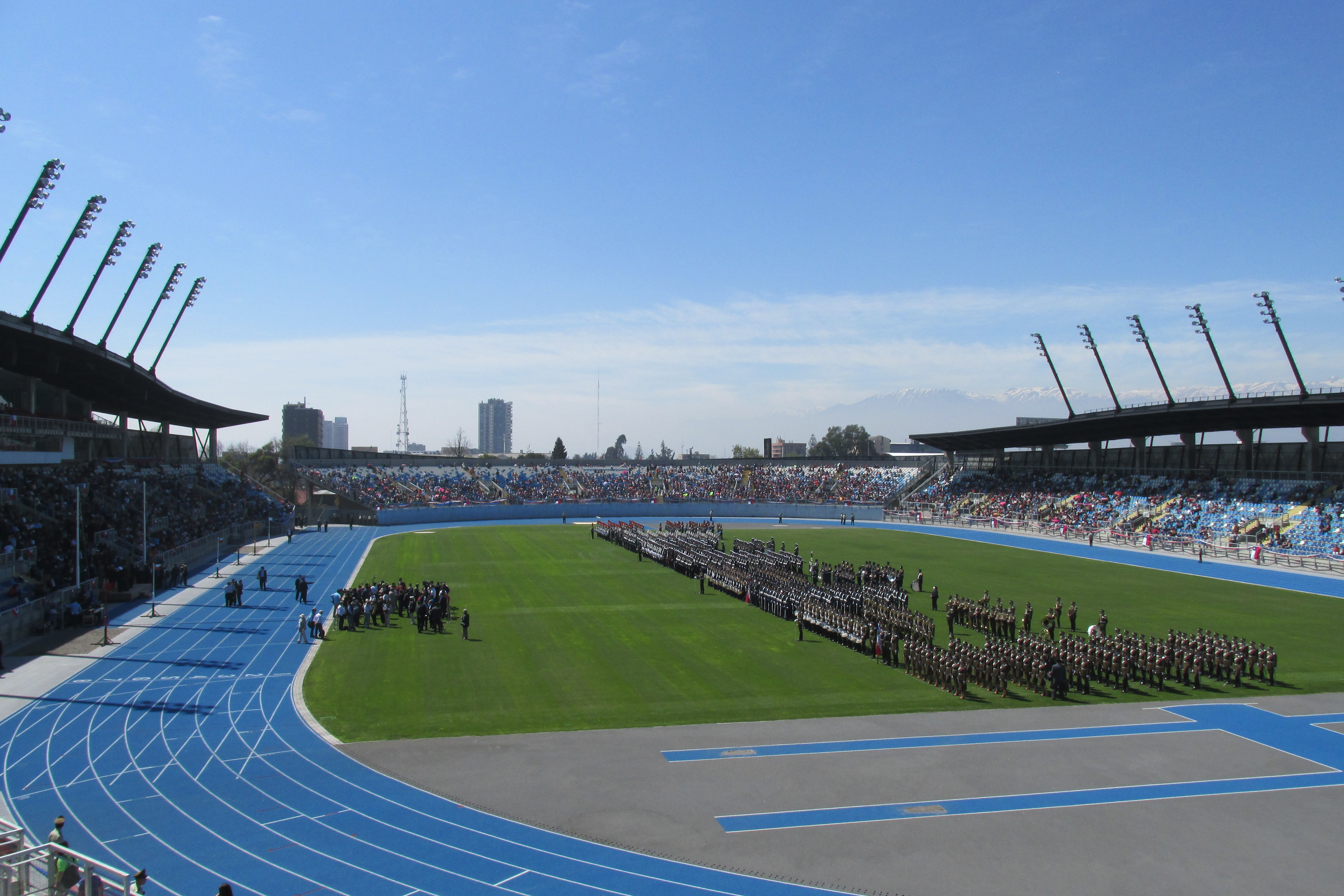
The Estadio El Teniente hosted the 2015 Copa América.

The sport in the city is varied including football, basketball and hockey. The city's most famous football club is O'Higgins, who currently plays in the first category of Chilean soccer, the Primera División de Chile. O'Higgins had great past glories, with the help of El Teniente they became one of the leading teams of Chile during the 1970s, participating on several occasions in the Copa Libertadores, their best performance being a semifinal appearance. In 2013, they won the Primera División de Chile for the first time, followed by a win in the Supercopa de Chile in 2014. Amongst other football clubs in the city are Tomás Greig and Enfoque, both of which play in the Tercera División de Chile.

Since 2015 the Autódromo Internacional de Codegua in the neighboring commune of Codegua held the Chile Grand Prix in the Superbike World Championship, the circuit was supposed to also host a race in the 2016 Grand Prix motorcycle racing season, although those plans were cancelled.

=== Stadiums and arenas ===
- Estadio El Teniente, host of the 1962 FIFA World Cup and 2015 Copa América.
- Medialuna Monumental de Rancagua, host the Campeonato Nacional de Rodeo and Davis Cup.
- Autódromo Internacional de Codegua.
- Gimnasio Hermógenes Lizana
- Estadio Municipal de Rancagua
- Gimnasio Asociación de Básquetbol de Rancagua
- Estadio Guillermo Saavedra

== Twin towns – sister cities ==
Rancagua is twinned with:

- Logroño, Spain
- Paju, South Korea
- San Francisco, Argentina

== Gallery ==
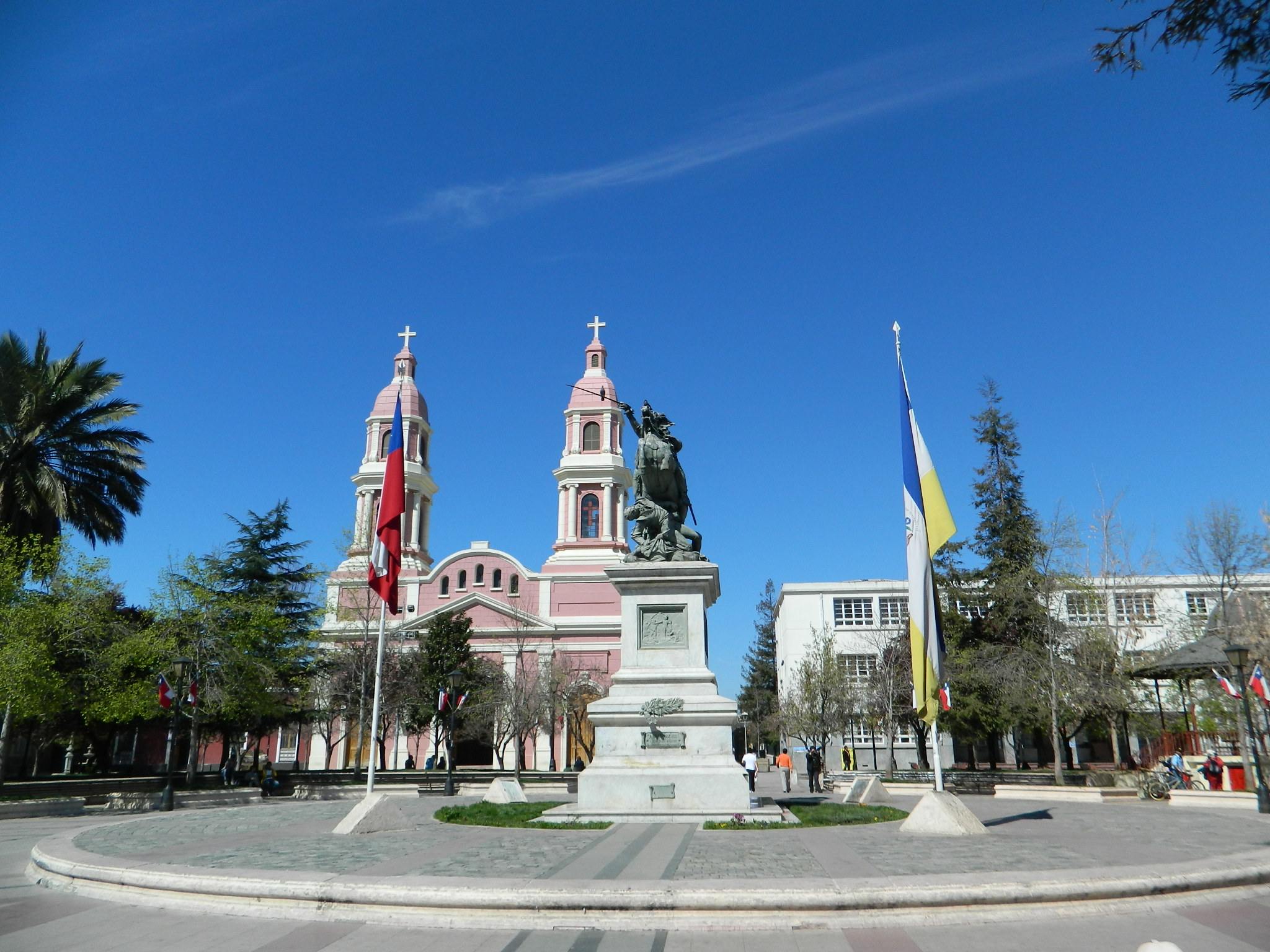
Los Heroes Square

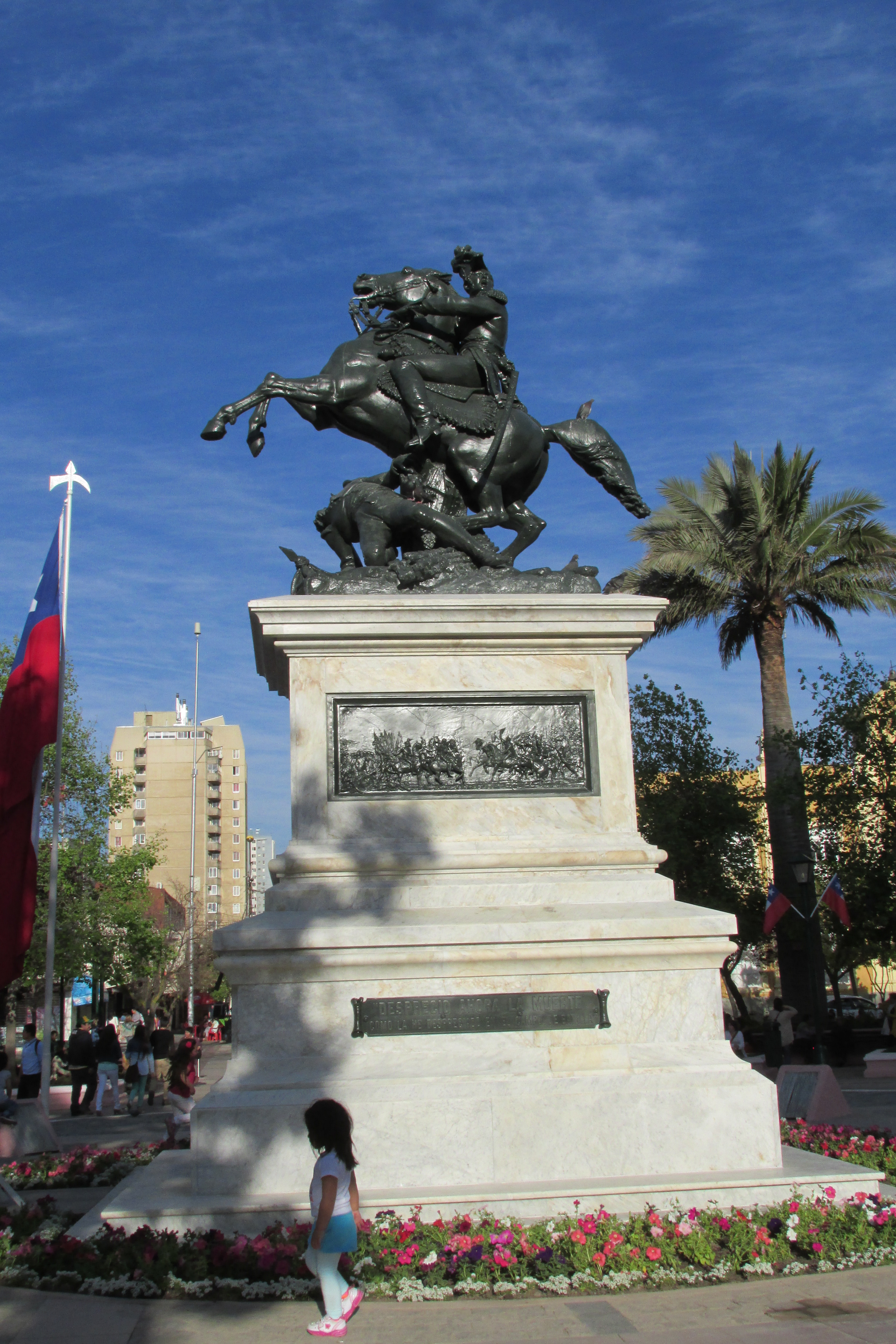
Bernardo O'Higgins Monument

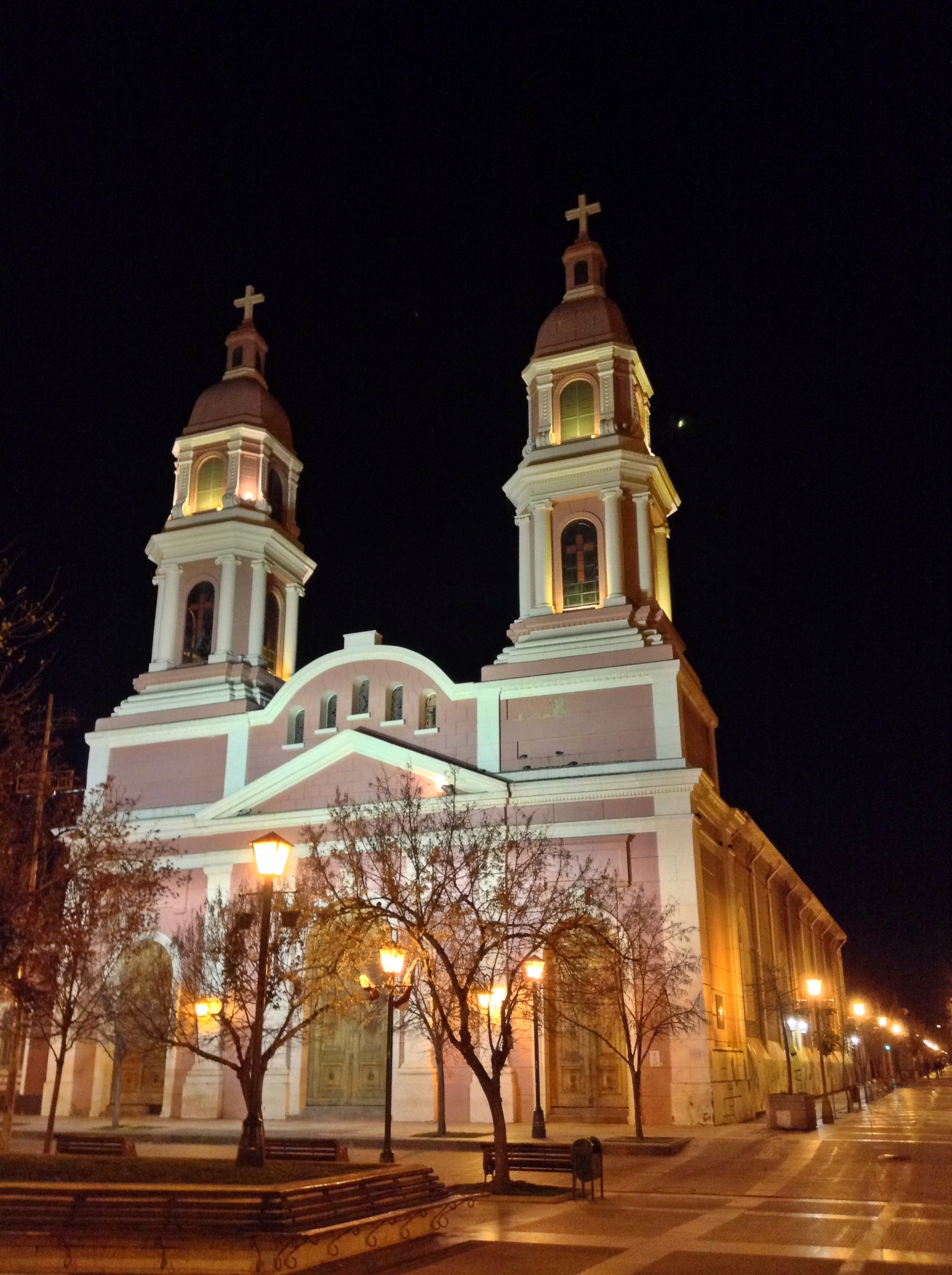
Rancagua cathedral at night

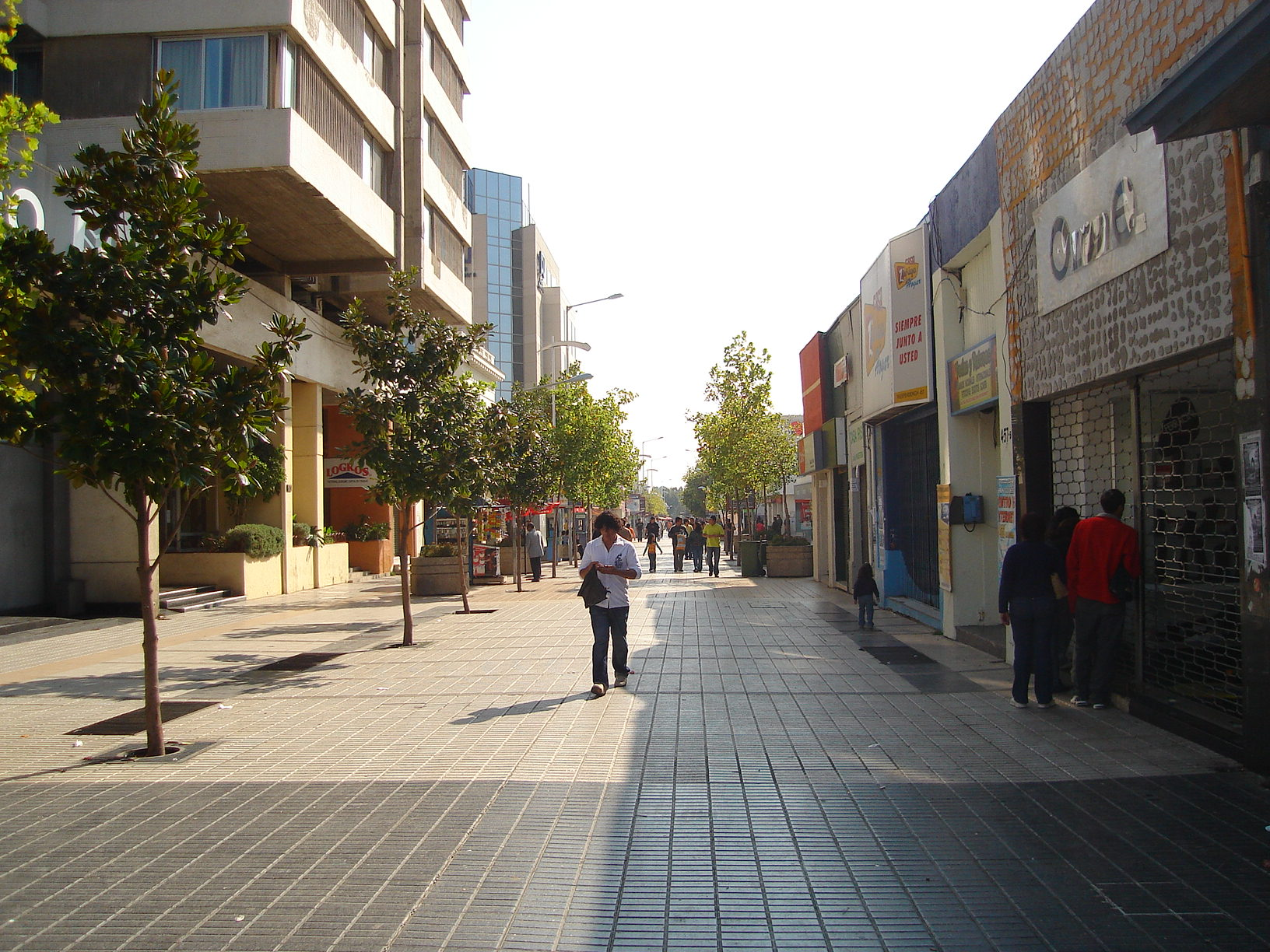
Paseo Independencia, Rancagua

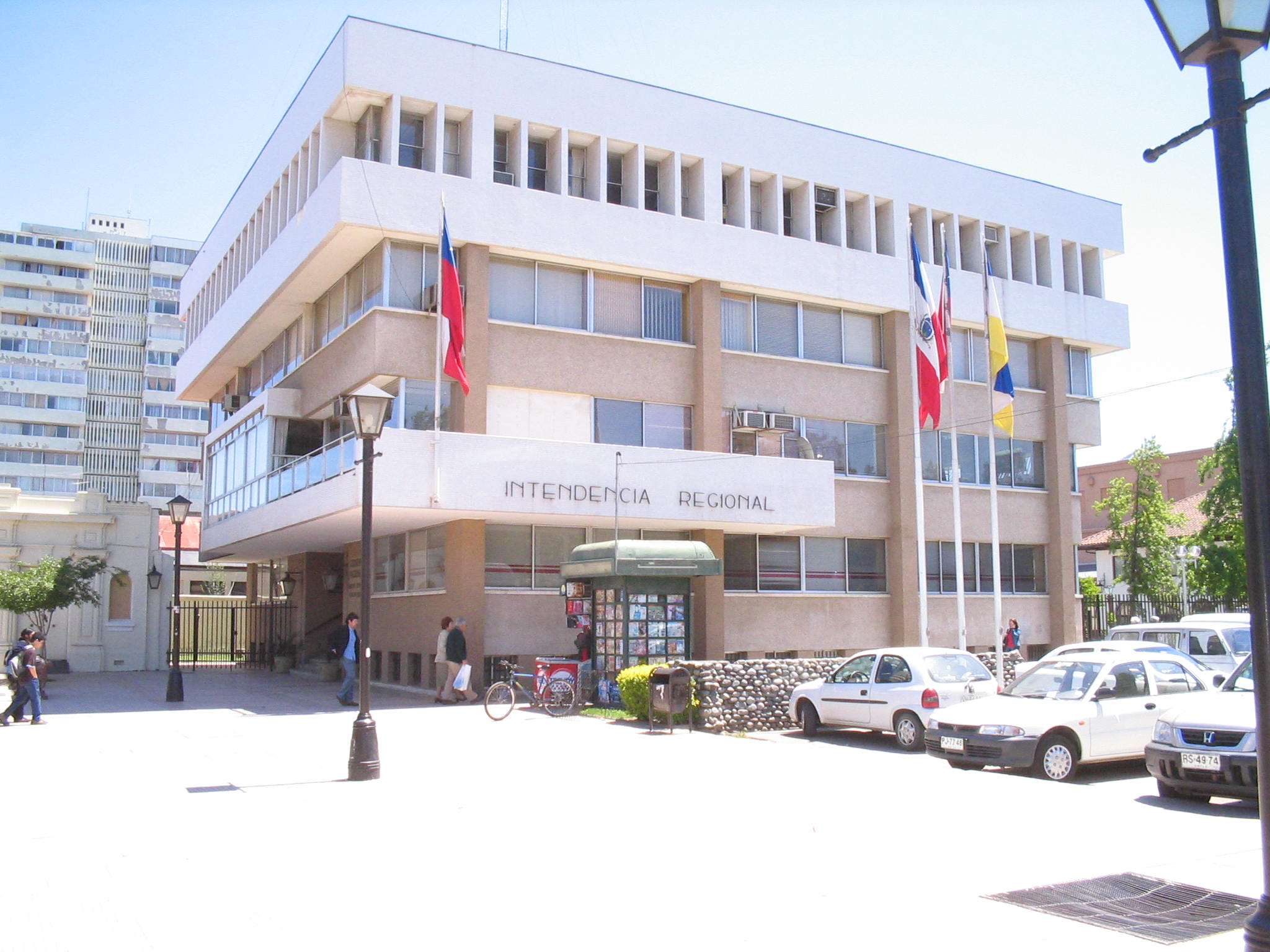
O'Higgins Region former Intendencia

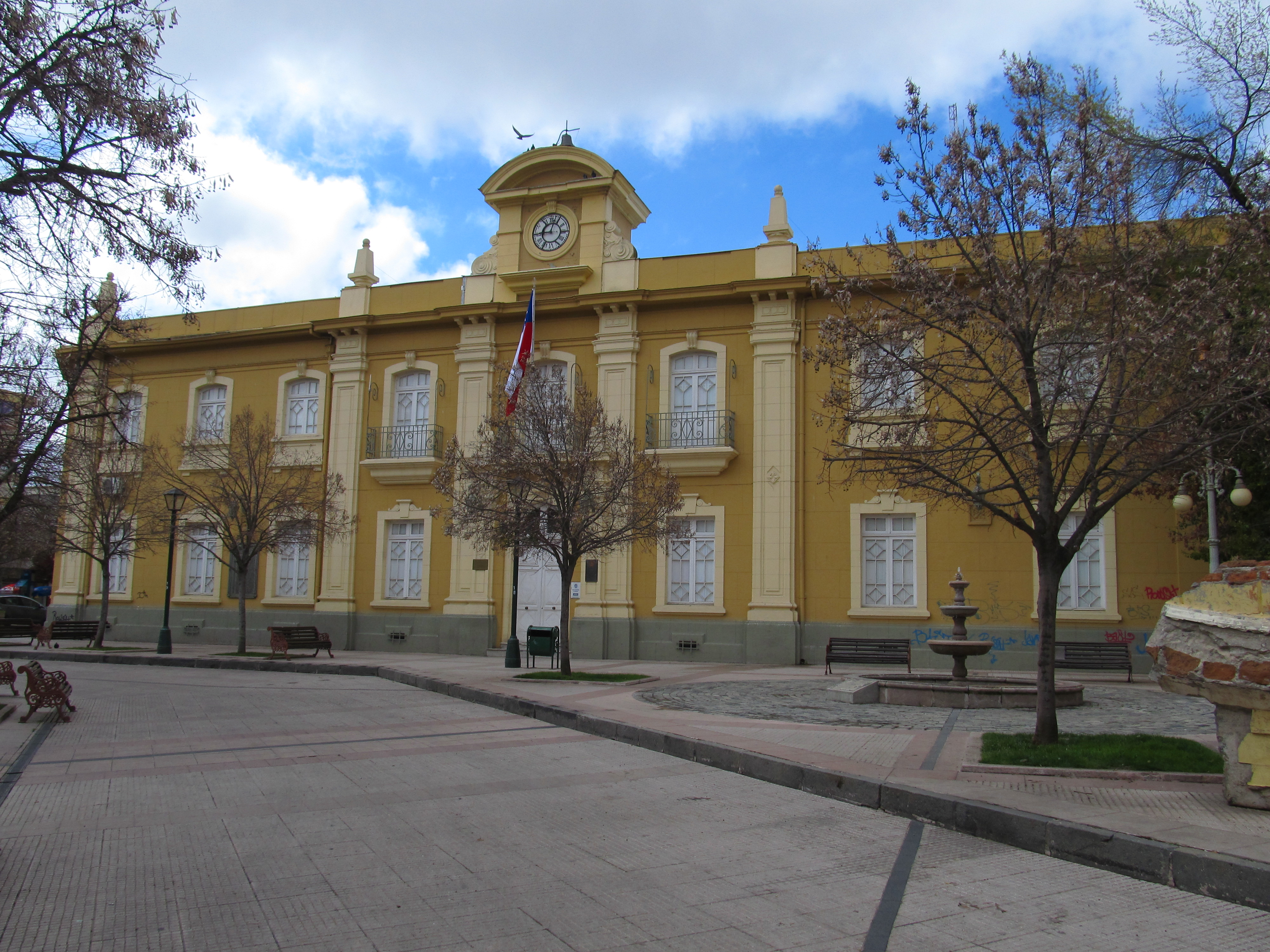
Cachapoal province government's building (currently the Regional Presidential Delegation)

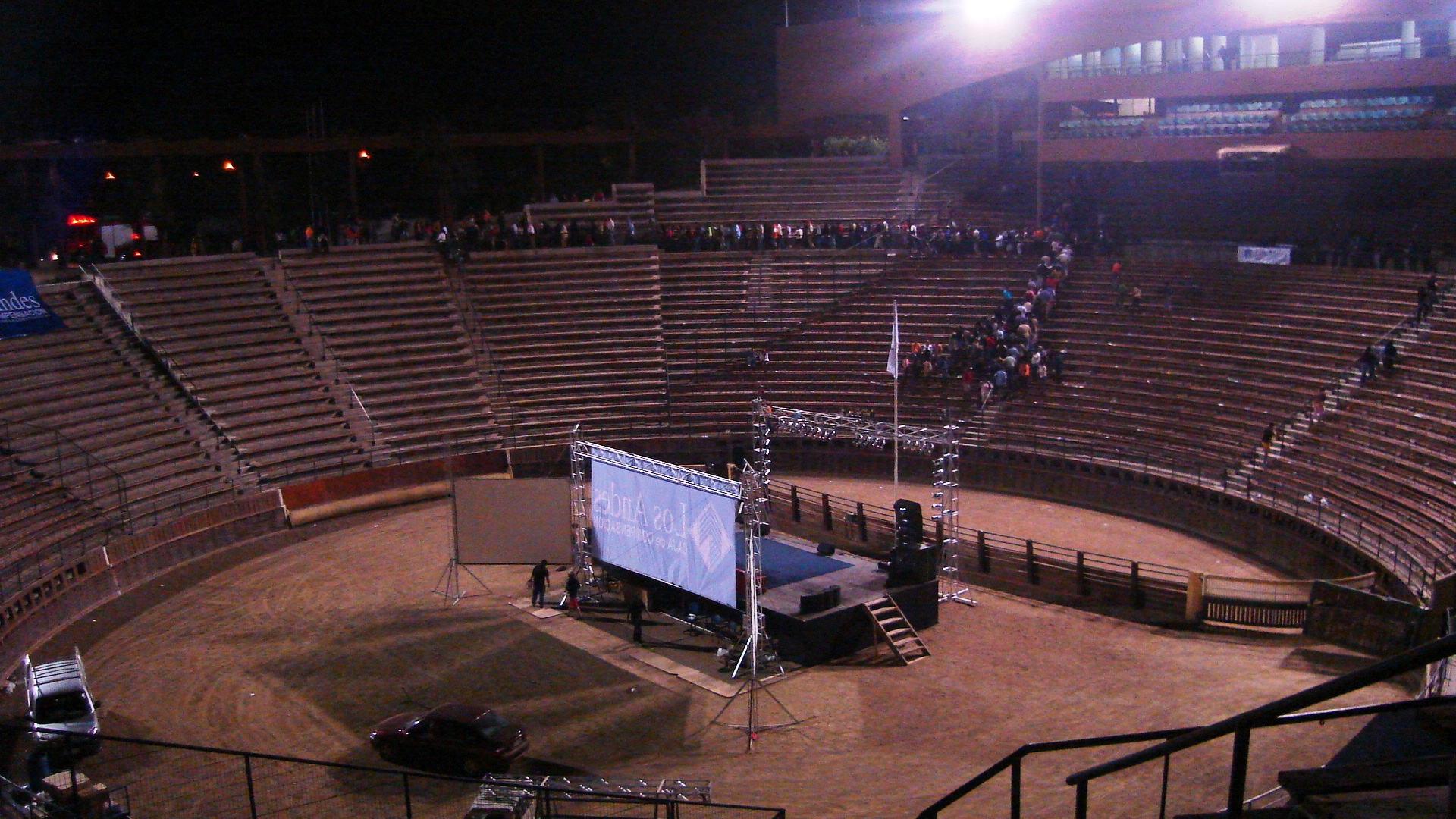
Medialuna de Rancagua

== See also ==
- O'Higgins F.C.
- Battle of Rancagua
- Medialuna de Rancagua
- Sewell, Chile
- Codelco
