= Rancagua conurbation =

Conurbation in Chile

Rancagua conurbation, or Greater Rancagua, is a Chilean conurbation in the O'Higgins Region composed of Rancagua and some parts of Machalí and Gultro. It has an estimated population of 307,004 inhabitants for 2008. Several villages are expected to join the conurbation in a near future, like Olivar Bajo (Olivar), Punta de Cortés (Rancagua) and La Compañia (Graneros).
